= Bristol (disambiguation) =

Bristol is a city and county in the South-west of England.

Bristol may also refer to:

== Businesses ==
- Bristol Aeroplane Company, an early British aviation company
- Bristol Aerospace, a Canadian aerospace firm
- Bristol Boats, an Indian fibreglass boat manufacturer
- Bristol Cars, a British manufacturer of luxury cars
- Bristol Commercial Vehicles, a British manufacturer of buses and trucks
- Bristol Omnibus Company, a British bus operator
- Bristol Paint, an Australian decorating supplies company

== Places ==
=== Canada ===
- Bristol, Quebec
- Bristol, New Brunswick
- Bristol, Nova Scotia

=== United Kingdom ===
- Bristol Airport
- Bristol Castle
- Bristol (European Parliament constituency), existed 1979–1999
- Bristol (UK Parliament constituency), existed 1295–1885

=== United States ===
- Bristol Bay, Alaska
- Bristol Mountains, California
- Bristol, Colorado
- Bristol, Connecticut
- Bristol, Florida
- Bristol, Georgia
- Bristol, Illinois
- Bristol, Indiana
- Bristol, Maine
- Bristol, Maryland
- Bristol County, Massachusetts
- Bristol Township, Minnesota
- Bristol, New Hampshire, a town
  - Bristol (CDP), New Hampshire, the main village in the town
- Bristol, New York
- Bristol, Perry County, Ohio
- Bristol Township, Morgan County, Ohio
- Bristol, Pennsylvania
- Bristol Township, Pennsylvania
- Bristol, Rhode Island
- Bristol County, Rhode Island
- Bristol, South Dakota
- Bristol, Tennessee
- Bristol, Texas
- Bristol, Vermont, a town
  - Bristol (CDP), Vermont, the main settlement in the town
- Bristol, Virginia
- Bristol (village), Wisconsin
- Bristol, Dane County, Wisconsin, a town
- Bristol (town), Kenosha County, Wisconsin, a former town

=== Elsewhere ===
- Bristol Island, of the South Sandwich Islands
- Playa Bristol, a beach in Mar del Plata, Argentina

== Ships ==
- Bristol (1866 steamboat), a US steamboat
- Bristol City (1919), a British cargo ship
- English ship Bristol (1653), a 48-gun warship
- HMS Bristol (1711), a 54-gun fourth-rate ship
- HMS Bristol (1775), a 50-gun fourth-rate ship
- HMS Agincourt (1796), a 64-gun third-rate ship, renamed HMS Bristol in 1812
- HMS Bristol (1861), a wooden screw frigate
- HMS Bristol (1910), a Town-class light cruiser
- HMS Bristol (D23), a unique Type 82 destroyer launched in 1973
- USS Bristol (DD-453), a Gleaves-class destroyer commissioned in 1941
- USS Bristol (DD-857), Allen M. Sumner-class destroyer commissioned in 1945
- USS Arthur L. Bristol, a United States Navy high-speed transport in commission from 1945 to 1946
- A subclass of Town-class cruiser

== Other uses ==
- "Bristol" (The Architecture the Railways Built), a 2021 television episode
- Bristol (solitaire), a card game
- Bristol blue glass
- Bristol board, a type of paper
- Bristol F.2 Fighter, a biplane aircraft
- Bristol Head, a mountain in Colorado
- Bristol Motor Speedway, a NASCAR racetrack in Tennessee
- Bristol Bears, a rugby union club in England
- Bristol Stool Scale, a human faeces classification chart
- Bristol wrench, a hand tool
- Hotel Bristol, a common hotel name
- Marquess of Bristol, a title in the British aristocracy
- Caenorhabditis elegans var Bristol, a historic subspecies of C. elegans worms

== People with the surname ==
- Arthur L. Bristol (1886–1942), U.S. Navy admiral
- Dave Bristol (born 1933), American baseball manager
- Johnny Bristol (1939–2004), American musician
- Kenny Bristol (born 1952), Guyanese boxer
- Kervin Bristol (born 1988), Haitian basketball player
- Mark Lambert Bristol, U.S. Navy admiral
- Nathan Bristol (1805–1874), American merchant and politician
- Reshea Bristol (born 1978), American basketball player
- Wheeler H. Bristol (1818–1904), American engineer and politician

== People with the given name ==
- Bristol Palin (born 1990), American personality and real estate agent

== See also ==
- Bristol Airport (disambiguation)
- Bristol College (disambiguation)
- Bristol County (disambiguation)
- Bristol Hotel, numerous hotels
- Bristol station (disambiguation)
- List of places called Bristol
