= List of places called Bristol =

This is a list of places named Bristol, which includes items such as population centres, islands and geographical features. There are thirty-five populated places in the world named Bristol, the vast majority of which are in the United States. There are four places named Bristol in Canada. One each in the United Kingdom, Peru, Costa Rica and Jamaica. Bristol is the fifth most commonly re-used British place name, behind Richmond which has 55 namesakes, London which has 46, Oxford with 41 and Manchester which shares its name with 36 other places.

By far the largest Bristol is Bristol, England, with a population of 441,300 within the city boundaries in 2010, followed by Bristol, Connecticut, which had 60,477 people living there at the time of the 2010 census. Bristol Wells Town Site is a ghost town, and therefore has nobody living there.

The English Bristol played a major part in the discovery and settlement of the United States, it being the port from where John Cabot sailed on his 1497 voyage which is commonly credited as the first from Europe to North America, although there is evidence that he was not the first European to sail there. The city was a major port at the time North America was being colonised, resulting in many of the American and Canadian towns of the same name being named after it.

There are two US states that have more than one place called Bristol in them; Pennsylvania, which has a borough and a township with that name, and Wisconsin, which has two towns. All Bristols are in the Western Hemisphere, and most are also in the Northern Hemisphere. The only populated place in the Southern Hemisphere is Bristol, Peru.

== Population centres ==
Place	Country	Subdivision	Coordinates	Type of location	Naming	Notes
Bristol	Canada	New Brunswick	46°26′36″N 67°36′55″W	Village		Merged with Florenceville in 2008
Bristol	Canada	Prince Edward Island	46°24′51″N 62°43′48″W	Village		
Bristol	Canada	Quebec	45°35′00″N 76°23′00″W	Municipality	Named after Bristol, England	
Bristol	Canada	Nova Scotia	44°3′3.43″N 64°42′55.11″W	Community		
Little Bristol	Barbados	St. Peter	13°15′04″N 59°38′38″W	Populated place		
Bristol	Costa Rica	Limón	10°02′00″N 83°18′00″W	Populated place		
Bristol	Jamaica	Cornwall	18°17′00″N 77°32′00″W	Populated place		
Bristol	Peru	Loreto	4°50′00″S 76°35′00″W	Populated place		Also spelled Brístol
Bristol	United Kingdom	England	51°27′00″N 2°35′00″W	City		
Bristol	United States	Colorado	38°07′20″N 102°18′40″W	Unincorporated town		
Bristol	United States	Connecticut	41°40′18″N 72°56′57″W	City		
Bristol	United States	Florida	30°25′37″N 84°58′45″W	City		
Bristol	United States	Georgia	31°26′54″N 82°12′53″W	City		
Bristol	United States	Iowa	43°24′43″N 93°28′04″W	Township		
Bristol	United States	Illinois	41°41′08″N 88°25′41″W	Unincorporated community		
Bristol	United States	Indiana	41°43′16″N 85°49′06″W	Town		
Bristol	United States	Louisiana	30°22′15″N 92°08′18″W	Populated place		
Bristol	United States	Maryland	38°47′32″N 76°40′06″W	Unincorporated community		
Bristol	United States	Maine	43°57′27″N 69°30′33″W	Town	Named after Bristol, England	
Bristol County	United States	Massachusetts	41°45′N 71°05′W	County		
Bristol County	United States	Rhode Island	41°43′N 71°19′W	County		
Bristol	United States	Michigan	44°06′14″N 85°35′01″W	Unincorporated community		
Bristol	United States	Minnesota	43°32′40″N 92°10′09″W	Township		
Bristol	United States	Missouri	39°05′30″N 94°27′10″W	Populated place		
Bristol	United States	Nevada	38°04′48″N 114°37′07″W	Ghost town		
Bristol	United States	New Hampshire	43°35′28″N 71°44′12″W	Town	Sand found in area is similar to Bristol Sand used in England	
Bristol	United States	New York	42°49′11″N 77°25′28″W	Town	Named after Bristol County, Massachusetts	
Bristol	United States	Ohio	39°41′52″N 81°43′53″W	Unincorporated community		
Bristol Township	United States	Ohio	39°42′29″N 81°44′41″W	Township		
Bristol	United States	Pennsylvania	40°06′12″N 74°51′05″W	Borough		
Bristol Township	United States	Pennsylvania	40°07′00″N 74°51′59″W	Township		
Bristol	United States	Rhode Island	41°41′03″N 71°16′07″W	Town	Named after Bristol, England	
Bristol	United States	South Dakota	45°20′43″N 97°45′03″W	City	Named after Bristol, England	
Bristol	United States	Tennessee	36°34′09″N 82°11′51″W	City		
Bristol	United States	Texas	32°27′41″N 96°34′11″W	Community		
Bristol	United States	Vermont	44°07′45″N 73°04′16″W	Town		
Bristol	United States	Virginia	36°36′40″N 82°10′34″W	City	Named after Bristol, England	
Bristol	United States	Washington	47°08′50″N 120°47′59″W	Community		
Bristol	United States	West Virginia	39°17′16″N 80°31′27″W	Populated place		
Bristol, Dane County	United States	Wisconsin	43°14′45″N 89°10′44″W	Town		
Bristol (town), Kenosha County	United States	Wisconsin	42°32′35″N 88°0′58″W	Town		
Bristol (village), Kenosha County	United States	Wisconsin	42°32′35″N 88°00′58″W	Village		

== Other places ==
Place	Country	Subdivision	Coordinates	Type of location	Naming
Bristol Bay	United States	Alaska	57°56′59″N 158°31′18″W	Body of water	Named after the 3rd Earl of Bristol
Bristol Dry Lake	United States	California	34°29′27″N 115°41′38″W	Dry lake	
Bristol Island	South Georgia and the South Sandwich Islands		59°02′00″S 26°31′00″W	Island	Named after the 3rd Earl of Bristol
Bristol Mountains	United States	California	34°50′57″N 116°03′18″W	Mountain range	
Playa Bristol	Argentina		34°50′57″N 116°03′18″W	Beach	Named after Bristol Hotel, Mar del Plata

== Sources ==
- "Bristol". Geody.com.
