= List of United States tornadoes from September to October 2019 =

United States tornadoes from September to October 2019
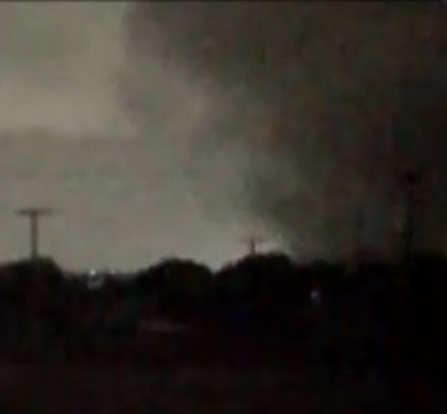
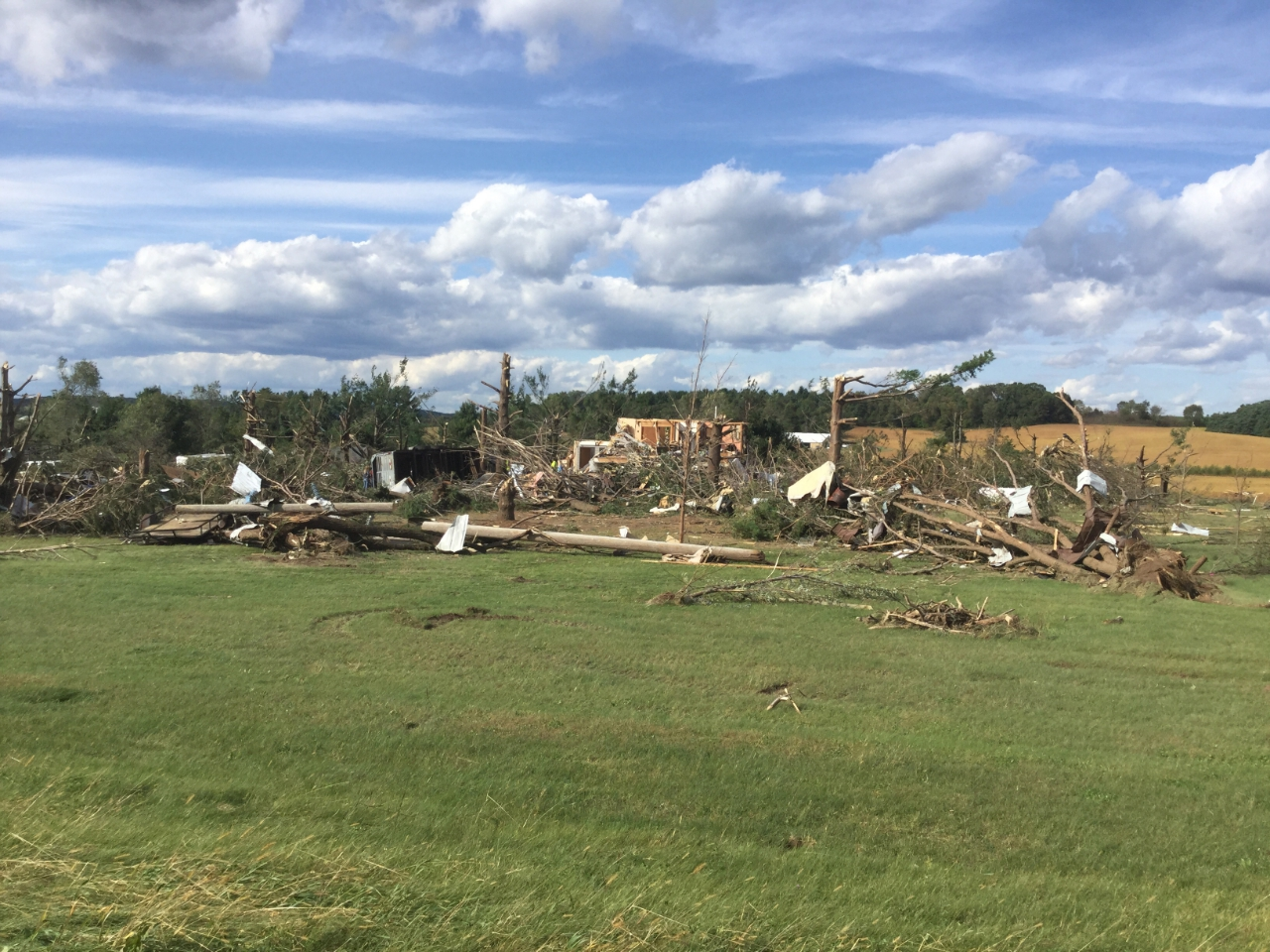
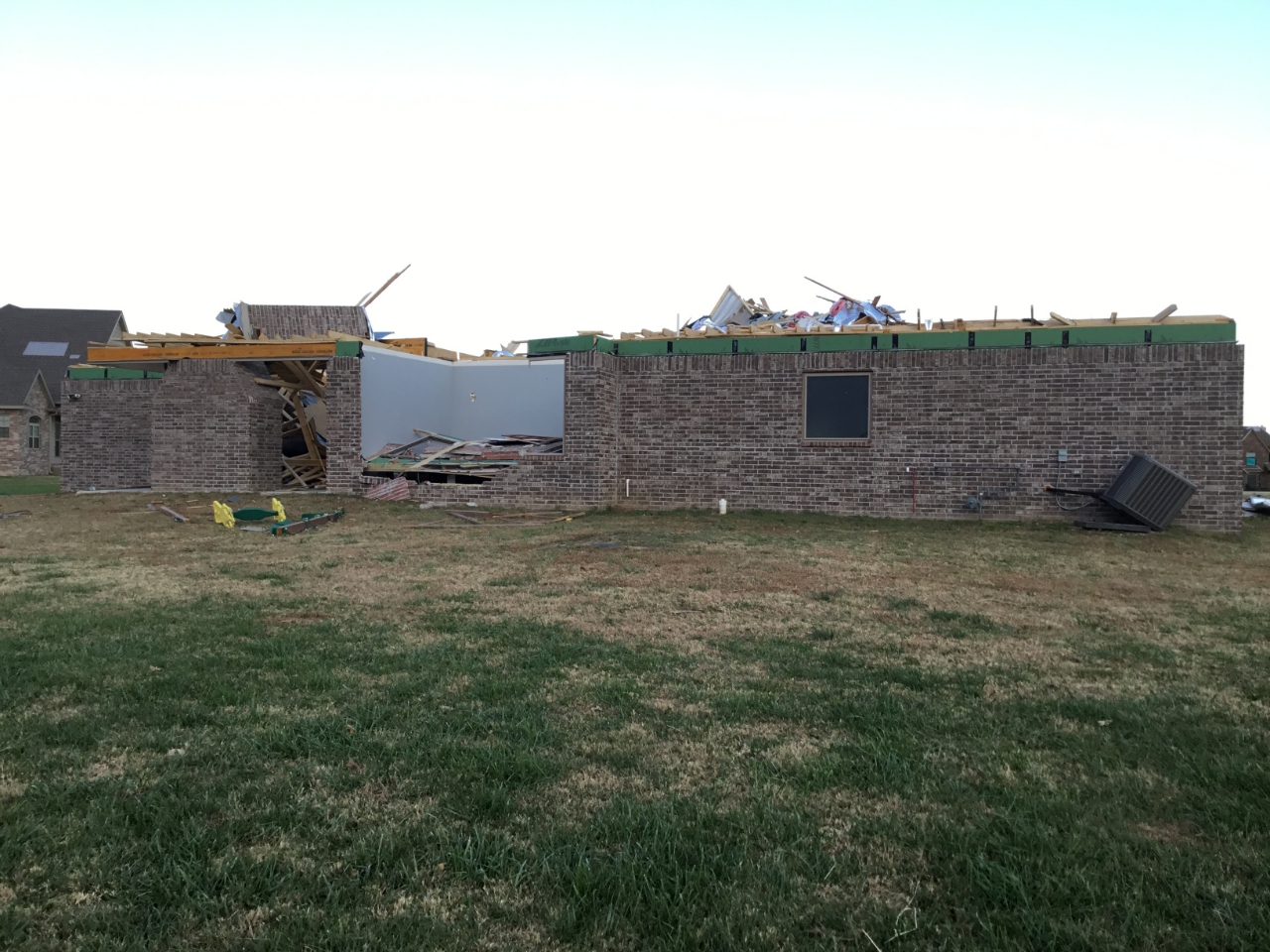
- Clockwise from top: A destructive EF3 tornado while moving through Dallas, Texas on October 20; The roof of a home blown off after a large EF2 tornado east of Siloam Springs, Arkansas on October 21; EF3 damage from a tornado that struck Pine Grove, Wisconsin on September 24.
- Timespan: September 1 – October 31
- Maximum rated tornado: EF3 tornado: Pine Grove, Wisconsin on September 24; Dallas, Texas on October 20
- Tornadoes: 146
- Fatalities: 0
- Injuries: 26

This page documents all tornadoes confirmed by various weather forecast offices of the National Weather Service in the United States during September to October 2019.

== United States yearly total ==
Confirmed tornadoes by Enhanced Fujita rating
| EFU | EF0 | EF1 | EF2 | EF3 | EF4 | EF5 | Total |
|---|---|---|---|---|---|---|---|
| 179 | 655 | 540 | 119 | 33 | 3 | 0 | 1,529 |

== September ==
Confirmed tornadoes by Enhanced Fujita rating
| EFU | EF0 | EF1 | EF2 | EF3 | EF4 | EF5 | Total |
|---|---|---|---|---|---|---|---|
| 11 | 49 | 14 | 8 | 1 | 0 | 0 | 83 |

=== September 1 event ===
List of confirmed tornadoes – Sunday, September 1, 2019 (Note: All dates are based on the local time zone where the tornado touched down; however, all times are in Coordinated Universal Time for consistency.)
| EF# | Location | County / Parish | State | Start Coord. | Time (UTC) | Path length | Max width |
|---|---|---|---|---|---|---|---|
| EF0 | S of Neoga | Cumberland | IL | 39.2051°N 88.4484°W | 19:31–19:33 | 0.31 mi (0.50 km) | 30 yd (27 m) |
| EF0 | A brief tornado caused crop damage in a corn field. | | | | | | |

=== September 2 event ===
List of confirmed tornadoes – Monday, September 2, 2019
| EF# | Location | County / Parish | State | Start Coord. | Time (UTC) | Path length | Max width |
|---|---|---|---|---|---|---|---|
| EF0 | Manorville | Suffolk | NY | 40.8417°N 72.8313°W | 20:33–20:38 | 1.63 mi (2.62 km) | 50 yd (46 m) |
| EF0 | A short-lived tornado snapped or uprooted numerous trees and destroyed a shed. A few homes sustained damage from falling branches. The tornado crossed the Long Island Expressway before dissipating. | | | | | | |
| EF1 | SW of Howard Lake | Wright | MN | 45.0516°N 94.1122°W | 02:47–02:49 | 1.04 mi (1.67 km) | 90 yd (82 m) |
| EF1 | A short-lived tornado destroyed a few outbuildings, largely removed the roof of a barn, and snapped or uprooted many trees. | | | | | | |
| EF1 | E of Watertown | Carver, Hennepin | MN | 44.9632°N 93.7922°W | 03:08–03:13 | 3.87 mi (6.23 km) | 210 yd (190 m) |
| EF1 | A tornado uprooted multiple softwood and hardwood trees along its path. One outbuilding had metal sheeting torn away. | | | | | | |

=== September 3 event ===
List of confirmed tornadoes – Tuesday, September 3, 2019
| EF# | Location | County / Parish | State | Start Coord. | Time (UTC) | Path length | Max width |
|---|---|---|---|---|---|---|---|
| EF1 | Northern Waukegan | Lake | IL | 42.4113°N 87.8624°W | 23:39–23:43 | 3.1 mi (5.0 km) | 200 yd (180 m) |
| EF1 | A tornado caused minor roof damage and blew out windows at multiple commercial buildings in Waukegan. Numerous trees were snapped or uprooted and one vehicle was flipped, injuring the occupant. The tornado moved over Lake Michigan before dissipating. | | | | | | |

=== September 4 event ===
List of confirmed tornadoes – Wednesday, September 4, 2019
| EF# | Location | County / Parish | State | Start Coord. | Time (UTC) | Path length | Max width |
|---|---|---|---|---|---|---|---|
| EF1 | Coventry to Mansfield | Tolland | CT | 41.828°N 72.357°W | 21:40–21:49 | 3.2 mi (5.1 km) | 50 yd (46 m) |
| EF1 | A tornado tracked along an intermittent path, damaging many trees and a cornfield. | | | | | | |

=== September 5 event ===
Events were associated with Hurricane Dorian.

List of confirmed tornadoes – Thursday, September 5, 2019
| EF# | Location | County / Parish | State | Start Coord. | Time (UTC) | Path length | Max width |
|---|---|---|---|---|---|---|---|
| EF1 | Little River | Horry | SC | 33.8679°N 78.6147°W | 08:37–08:48 | 4.76 mi (7.66 km) | 75 yd (69 m) |
| EF1 | A tornado first caused damage along the Intracoastal Waterway near Little River, damaging a wooden dock and trees. A large portion of the dock was lofted 150 yd (140 m). Moving through northern areas of Little River, the tornado snapped or uprooted numerous trees and caused shingle damage to homes. A few homes in The Retreat neighborhood on the east side of Highway 9 suffered partial roof loss. The tornado subsequently dissipated just west of Highway 9. | | | | | | |
| EF0 | Military Ocean Terminal Sunny Point | Brunswick | NC | 34.9687°N 77.9403°W | 09:19–09:25 | 4.12 mi (6.63 km) | 35 yd (32 m) |
| EF0 | A waterspout was initially observed over the Cape Fear River and moved onshore at the Military Ocean Terminal Sunny Point complex. Minor tree damage was observed across the facility. | | | | | | |
| EF1 | N of Supply | Brunswick | NC | 34.0623°N 78.2650°W | 09:23–09:26 | 2.56 mi (4.12 km) | 50 yd (46 m) |
| EF1 | A tornado snapped or uprooted dozens of trees in the Green Swamp Preserve. | | | | | | |
| EF0 | WSW of Socastee | Horry | SC | 33.669°N 79.0569°W | 09:45–09:46 | 0.09 mi (0.14 km) | 15 yd (14 m) |
| EF0 | A brief tornado caused minor damage to a condo and partially uprooted about two dozen trees. | | | | | | |
| EF0 | Wilmington | New Hanover | NC | 34.2214°N 77.8995°W | 10:17–10:22 | 2.47 mi (3.98 km) | 20 yd (18 m) |
| EF0 | A weak tornado caused minor tree damage in Wilmington. | | | | | | |
| EF0 | North Myrtle Beach | Horry | SC | 33.8371°N 78.6725°W | 10:37–10:38 | 0.3 mi (0.48 km) | 25 yd (23 m) |
| EF0 | A brief tornado struck the Waterway View Mobile, severely damaging two mobile homes and causing minor damage to seven others. Multiple condominiums in a nearby community sustained facade and roof damage. | | | | | | |
| EF0 | SSW of Delco | Columbus | NC | 34.2519°N 78.2469°W | 10:37–10:41 | 2.12 mi (3.41 km) | 50 yd (46 m) |
| EF0 | A tornado severely damaged the roof of a mobile home and downed several trees. | | | | | | |
| EF0 | Northern Wilmington | New Hanover | NC | 34.2749°N 77.8726°W | 10:39–10:41 | 0.31 mi (0.50 km) | 35 yd (32 m) |
| EF0 | A brief tornado touched down east-northeast of Wilmington International Airport. One shed was destroyed, several homes sustained minor damage, and multiple trees had branches snapped off. | | | | | | |
| EF0 | S of Myrtle Grove | New Hanover | NC | 34.1029°N 77.8821°W | 10:58–11:02 | 0.38 mi (0.61 km) | 30 yd (27 m) |
| EF0 | A brief tornado caused minor tree damage. | | | | | | |
| EF2 | Sunset Beach to NNW of Carolina Shores | Brunswick | NC | 33.8736°N 78.4796°W | 10:58–11:17 | 9.31 mi (14.98 km) | 200 yd (180 m) |
| EF2 | A waterspout moved ashore near Tubbs Inlet in Sunset Beach, causing minor roof damage to several structures. The tornado moved northwest into Carolina Shores where it caused the most significant damage. Dozens of homes sustained varying degrees of damage, with some having large sections of their roof torn off. Numerous trees were snapped in this area, with branches found lodged into some structures. One person was injured in the town. Moving through the Crow Creek Golf Club, the tornado snapped or uprooted dozens of trees and caused minor structural damage. It later dissipated near the Waccamaw River. | | | | | | |
| EF0 | SE of Kelly | Bladen | NC | 34.4195°N 78.2565°W | 11:21–11:26 | 4.87 mi (7.84 km) | 40 yd (37 m) |
| EF0 | A tornado snapped or uprooted multiple trees and caused minor damage to the Kelly Museum. | | | | | | |
| EF0 | St. Helena | Pender | NC | 34.4843°N 77.8268°W | 11:45–11:53 | 7.13 mi (11.47 km) | 40 yd (37 m) |
| EF0 | A tornado caused primarily minor tree damage along its path. A few structures in St. Helena sustained roof damage. | | | | | | |
| EF0 | SW of Hampstead | Pender | NC | 34.3306°N 77.7512°W | 11:56–12:02 | 0.53 mi (0.85 km) | 30 yd (27 m) |
| EF0 | A brief tornado caused minor tree damage and partially removed a wall from an outbuilding. | | | | | | |
| EF2 | Emerald Isle to Maysville | Carteret | NC | 34.6564°N 77.0524°W | 13:02–13:31 | 13 mi (21 km) | 200 yd (180 m) |
| EF2 | A large waterspout moved ashore in Emerald Isle near Bogue Inlet Pier. Numerous RV homes and mobile homes were destroyed, with some tossed 30 ft (9.1 m). Some of the homes had their ground anchors torn out. Several frame homes in the area sustained severe roof damage as well. The tornado continued through Cedar Point before crossing Bogue Sound. The waterspout largely remained over water for several miles and moved upstream along the White Oak River before moving back over land. After damaging one home near the river, the storm traversed undeveloped forest for 6 mi (9.7 km). The tornado ultimately impacted southern areas of Maysville where it damaged a few homes before lifting. | | | | | | |
| EF1 | ESE of Bayshore | New Hanover | NC | 34.278°N 77.734°W | 15:48–15:52 | 2.86 mi (4.60 km) | 100 yd (91 m) |
| EF1 | A waterspout moved onshore near Bayshore and caused minor damage to a beachfront home. The tornado moved across Eagle Point Golf Club where it snapped or uprooted many trees. | | | | | | |
| EF1 | SW of Rocky Point | Pender | NC | 34.4051°N 77.9361°W | 16:19–16:24 | 5.43 mi (8.74 km) | 60 yd (55 m) |
| EF1 | A tornado snapped or uprooted multiple trees and snapped a power pole. | | | | | | |
| EF0 | NW of Deep Run | Lenoir | NC | 35.1705°N 77.745°W | 16:37 | 0.1 mi (0.16 km) | 50 yd (46 m) |
| EF0 | Local law enforcement reported a brief tornado. | | | | | | |
| EF0 | SE of Watha | Pender | NC | 34.6028°N 77.7754°W | 17:10–17:15 | 4.4 mi (7.1 km) | 20 yd (18 m) |
| EF0 | A tornado touched down over the Holly Shelter Swamp; however, survey teams were unable to access the likely starting point of the tornado. Multiple trees were snapped along its path. | | | | | | |
| EF0 | Mar-Mac | Wayne | NC | 35.3348°N 78.0654°W | 17:52–17:53 | 0.63 mi (1.01 km) | 125 yd (114 m) |
| EF0 | A brief tornado caused shingle and facade damage to several homes. A trailer was rolled and a pickup truck was lofted several yards. | | | | | | |
| EF0 | N of Vanceboro | Craven | NC | 35.3502°N 77.1198°W | 18:30–18:38 | 5.7 mi (9.2 km) | 75 yd (69 m) |
| EF0 | Damage was confined to snapped and uprooted trees. | | | | | | |
| EF1 | NW of Saratoga | Wilson | NC | 35.6821°N 77.8204°W | 20:07–20:08 | 0.85 mi (1.37 km) | 200 yd (180 m) |
| EF1 | A brief tornado snapped or uprooted multiple trees. One outbuilding was destroyed and a cornfield was partially flattened. | | | | | | |
| EF0 | ENE of Smithfield | Johnston | NC | 35.5033°N 78.3401°W | 20:31–20:32 | 0.12 mi (0.19 km) | 50 yd (46 m) |
| EF0 | A brief tornado snapped or uprooted multiple trees, one of which fell on a home. | | | | | | |
| EF0 | New Bern | Craven | NC | 35.1061°N 77.038°W | 21:00–21:01 | 0.1 mi (0.16 km) | 75 yd (69 m) |
| EF0 | A brief tornado caused minor tree damage in New Bern. An awning was damaged, and a trash can was blown over as well. | | | | | | |
| EF0 | WSW of Parkville | Perquimans | NC | 36.27°N 76.4402°W | 04:38–04:39 | 0.1 mi (0.16 km) | 50 yd (46 m) |
| EF0 | A brief tornado left a defined path through farmland. | | | | | | |
| EF0 | SE of Belvidere | Perquimans | NC | 36.25°N 76.5°W | 04:44–04:45 | 0.1 mi (0.16 km) | 50 yd (46 m) |
| EF0 | A tornado severely damaged three chicken houses and nearby outbuildings. | | | | | | |

=== September 6 event ===
List of confirmed tornadoes – Friday, September 6, 2019
| EF# | Location | County / Parish | State | Start Coord. | Time (UTC) | Path length | Max width |
|---|---|---|---|---|---|---|---|
| EF0 | S of Lone Tree | Douglas | CO | 39.53°N 104.88°W | 21:35 | 0.01 mi (0.016 km) | 25 yd (23 m) |
| EF0 | A trained storm spotter viewed a brief tornado in an open field. No damage occurred. | | | | | | |

=== September 8 event ===
List of confirmed tornadoes – Sunday, September 8, 2019
| EF# | Location | County / Parish | State | Start Coord. | Time (UTC) | Path length | Max width |
|---|---|---|---|---|---|---|---|
| EF0 | Denver International Airport | Denver | CO | 39.85°N 104.69°W | 23:41–23:42 | 0.01 mi (0.016 km) | 25 yd (23 m) |
| EF0 | A trained storm spotter viewed a brief tornado in an open field. No damage occurred. | | | | | | |
| EF0 | N of Denver International Airport | Adams | CO | 39.99°N 104.61°W | 23:53–23:54 | 0.01 mi (0.016 km) | 25 yd (23 m) |
| EF0 | The public viewed a brief tornado in an open field. No damage occurred. | | | | | | |
| EF0 | N of Rockcreek | Multnomah | OR | 45.6078°N 122.8707°W | 01:44–01:46 | 0.11 mi (0.18 km) | 120 yd (110 m) |
| EF0 | Barn doors, 19 solar panels, trees, and farmland that grew corn and pumpkins were damaged. | | | | | | |

=== September 9 event ===
List of confirmed tornadoes – Monday, September 9, 2019
| EF# | Location | County / Parish | State | Start Coord. | Time (UTC) | Path length | Max width |
|---|---|---|---|---|---|---|---|
| EF0 | W of Watertown | Codington | SD | 44.8943°N 97.2062°W | 20:37–20:41 | 2.58 mi (4.15 km) | 20 yd (18 m) |
| EF0 | A tornado was observed over farm fields. | | | | | | |
| EF0 | S of Thomas | Hamlin | SD | 44.7497°N 97.2096°W | 20:39–20:45 | 3.2 mi (5.1 km) | 40 yd (37 m) |
| EF0 | Lawn items, several metal beams on a Quonset barn, several outbuildings, and a silo were all damaged. Trees were snapped or uprooted. | | | | | | |
| EFU | NE of Dallas Center | Dallas | IA | 41.6969°N 93.9581°W | 21:32–21:35 | 1.37 mi (2.20 km) | 10 yd (9.1 m) |
| EFU | A tornado that moved through open cropland was identified using high-resolution satellite imagery. | | | | | | |
| EFU | E of Minburn | Dallas | IA | 41.7542°N 94.017°W | 21:33–21:38 | 2.86 mi (4.60 km) | 10 yd (9.1 m) |
| EFU | A tornado that moved through open cropland was identified using high-resolution satellite imagery. | | | | | | |
| EF0 | N of Webster | Day | SD | 45.3805°N 97.5119°W | 23:55–23:56 | 0.1 mi (0.16 km) | 10 yd (9.1 m) |
| EF0 | A tornado initially touched down over a lake before moving across farmland. | | | | | | |
| EF1 | N of Bristol | Day | SD | 45.4083°N 97.7402°W | 01:03–01:11 | 1.56 mi (2.51 km) | 80 yd (73 m) |
| EF1 | A fiberglass shed was demolished and tossed about 70 yd (64 m). Another outbuilding was lifted off its foundation and set down about 30 yd (27 m) away. Trees limbs were snapped and tossed up to 80 yd (73 m). Cattails were flattened and a deer stand was downed. | | | | | | |
| EF0 | NNE of Bristol | Day | SD | 45.4261°N 97.6842°W | 01:14–01:15 | 0.19 mi (0.31 km) | 10 yd (9.1 m) |
| EF0 | A brief tornado occurred over open fields. | | | | | | |

=== September 10 event ===
List of confirmed tornadoes – Tuesday, September 10, 2019
| EF# | Location | County / Parish | State | Start Coord. | Time (UTC) | Path length | Max width |
|---|---|---|---|---|---|---|---|
| EFU | SSE of Sunrise | Platte, Goshen | WY | 42.31°N 104.7°W | 21:09–21:19 | 4.8 mi (7.7 km) | 30 yd (27 m) |
| EFU | A storm chaser observed a wedge-shaped tornado over open fields. No damage occurred. | | | | | | |
| EF2 | N of Fort Laramie to NE of Lingle | Goshen | WY | 42.3339°N 104.5405°W | 22:14–22:46 | 19.12 mi (30.77 km) | 200 yd (180 m) |
| EF2 | A wedge-shaped tornado caused extensive to a few homes and other structures, and killed livestock and wild animals. Portions of the track were inaccessible to surveys. Storm chasers observed multiple satellite tornadoes. | | | | | | |
| EFU | E of Chugwater | Platte, Goshen | WY | 41.76°N 104.72°W | 22:58–21:19 | 8.52 mi (13.71 km) | 30 yd (27 m) |
| EFU | A storm chaser observed a rope-shaped tornado over open fields. No damage occurred. | | | | | | |
| EF0 | NW of Juhl | Sanilac | MI | 43.3776°N 83.0064°W | 01:02–01:07 | 3.78 mi (6.08 km) | 75 yd (69 m) |
| EF0 | A brief tornado destroyed a barn, snapped tree limbs, and damaged crops. | | | | | | |
| EF0 | SSW of Avon | Bon Homme | SD | 42.9397°N 98.1°W | 01:13–01:14 | 1.43 mi (2.30 km) | 20 yd (18 m) |
| EF0 | A brief tornado damaged an outbuilding and several trees. | | | | | | |
| EF2 | Southern Sioux Falls | Lincoln | SD | 43.4752°N 96.7471°W | 04:24-04:25 | 0.9 mi (1.4 km) | 50 yd (46 m) |
| EF2 | A short-lived tornado caused extensive roof damage to several homes on the south side of Sioux Falls. A few homes lost large portions of their roof and some walls. Widespread tree damage also occurred, and a trampoline was thrown. Monetary losses reached $1.2 million. | | | | | | |
| EF2 | Southeastern Sioux Falls | Lincoln | SD | 43.4904°N 96.7875°W | 04:24-04:25 | 0.63 mi (1.01 km) | 50 yd (46 m) |
| EF2 | A brief tornado caused damage to the Avera Behavioral Health Center and Avera Heart Hospital, resulting in 8 injuries. The majority of the hospital's windows were blown out, vehicles in the parking lot were tossed, and considerable roof and facade damage occurred. A nearby building under construction was damaged, and a truck there was tossed 200 yd (180 m). Metal street signs were bent to the ground as well. Monetary losses reached $1.8 million. | | | | | | |
| EF2 | Sioux Falls | Minnehaha | SD | 43.516°N 96.7611°W | 04:28-04:29 | 0.7 mi (1.1 km) | 75 yd (69 m) |
| EF2 | A short-lived tornado ripped much of the roof off a multi-story apartment building, destroyed a garage structure, and snapped or uprooted numerous trees. It also severely damaged an Advance Auto Parts, and blew portions of the roof and walls off of a strip mall. One person was injured after their home had part of its roof ripped off. Signs were blown over, and vehicles were flipped as well. Monetary losses reached $3 million. | | | | | | |

=== September 11 event ===
List of confirmed tornadoes – Wednesday, September 11, 2019
| EF# | Location | County / Parish | State | Start Coord. | Time (UTC) | Path length | Max width |
|---|---|---|---|---|---|---|---|
| EF1 | SW of Winona | Winona | MN | 44.0347°N 91.6605°W | 11:22–11:23 | 0.17 mi (0.27 km) | 80 yd (73 m) |
| EF1 | A brief tornado damaged trees and gravestones at the Woodlawn Cemetery. The roof of a shed was also damaged. | | | | | | |
| EF0 | Grand Rapids | Kent | MI | 42.9723°N 85.6682°W | 23:43–23:44 | 0.05 mi (0.080 km) | 25 yd (23 m) |
| EF0 | An apartment building in Grand Rapids had its roof peeled off by this brief tornado. | | | | | | |
| EF2 | WNW of Fleming | Logan | CO | 40.73°N 103.00°W | 00:58–01:03 | 0.5 mi (0.80 km) | 440 yd (400 m) |
| EF2 | A strong tornado snapped six power poles. | | | | | | |
| EF2 | NW of Fleming | Logan | CO | 40.71°N 102.95°W | 01:00–01:05 | 0.1 mi (0.16 km) | 75 yd (69 m) |
| EF2 | A strong tornado destroyed a well-constructed pole barn. | | | | | | |

=== September 12 event ===
List of confirmed tornadoes – Thursday, September 12, 2019
| EF# | Location | County / Parish | State | Start Coord. | Time (UTC) | Path length | Max width |
|---|---|---|---|---|---|---|---|
| EF0 | SSW of Ossian | Winneshiek | IA | 43.0915°N 91.7879°W | 21:49–21:55 | 2.82 mi (4.54 km) | 150 yd (140 m) |
| EF0 | An intermittent tornado damaged numerous trees and farm buildings. | | | | | | |
| EF0 | SW of Monona | Clayton | IA | 42.9688°N 91.4648°W | 22:34–22:41 | 4.22 mi (6.79 km) | 40 yd (37 m) |
| EF0 | Minor damage occurred to some trees and a few outbuildings. Tree branches were impaled through the wall of a home. | | | | | | |

=== September 16 event ===
List of confirmed tornadoes – Monday, September 16, 2019
| EF# | Location | County / Parish | State | Start Coord. | Time (UTC) | Path length | Max width |
|---|---|---|---|---|---|---|---|
| EF0 | SW of Arizona City | Pinal | AZ | 32.7°N 111.84°W | 20:55 | 0.1 mi (0.16 km) | 10 yd (9.1 m) |
| EF0 | A trained storm spotter reported a brief landspout tornado. No damage occurred. | | | | | | |

=== September 18 event ===
Event was associated with Tropical Storm Imelda.

List of confirmed tornadoes – Wednesday, September 18, 2019
| EF# | Location | County / Parish | State | Start Coord. | Time (UTC) | Path length | Max width |
|---|---|---|---|---|---|---|---|
| EF1 | ENE of Highlands | Harris | TX | 29.8409°N 95.0007°W | 21:56–22:05 | 3.04 mi (4.89 km) | 30 yd (27 m) |
| EF1 | A metal roof was ripped off a house, a barn at a feed store was severely damaged, and trees were snapped or uprooted. | | | | | | |

=== September 19 event ===
Event was associated with Tropical Storm Imelda.

List of confirmed tornadoes – Thursday, September 19, 2019
| EF# | Location | County / Parish | State | Start Coord. | Time (UTC) | Path length | Max width |
|---|---|---|---|---|---|---|---|
| EF0 | WSW of Hackberry | Cameron | LA | 29.9865°N 93.3974°W | 16:02–16:07 | 0.6 mi (0.97 km) | 50 yd (46 m) |
| EF0 | One RV was flipped and a second was damaged. A few trees were downed. | | | | | | |

=== September 20 event ===
List of confirmed tornadoes – Friday, September 20, 2019
| EF# | Location | County / Parish | State | Start Coord. | Time (UTC) | Path length | Max width |
|---|---|---|---|---|---|---|---|
| EF0 | E of Bisbee | Towner | ND | 48.62°N 99.36°W | 23:00 | 0.1 mi (0.16 km) | 25 yd (23 m) |
| EF0 | An emergency manager reported a brief tornado in an open field. | | | | | | |
| EFU | W of Alliance | Box Butte | NE | 42.09°N 103.19°W | 00:05–00:06 | 10.25 mi (16.50 km) | 20 yd (18 m) |
| EFU | A tornado was observed but caused no apparent damage. | | | | | | |

=== September 21 event ===
List of confirmed tornadoes – Saturday, September 21, 2019
| EF# | Location | County / Parish | State | Start Coord. | Time (UTC) | Path length | Max width |
|---|---|---|---|---|---|---|---|
| EFU | N of Cedar Vale | Chautauqua | KS | 37.22°N 96.5°W | 21:48–21:49 | 0.5 mi (0.80 km) | 25 yd (23 m) |
| EFU | A brief tornado did not cause any damage. | | | | | | |
| EF0 | N of Coin | Kanabec | MN | 45.7518°N 93.3108°W | 22:01–22:04 | 1.23 mi (1.98 km) | 80 yd (73 m) |
| EF0 | Some bean fields were damaged and about two dozen trees were snapped or uprooted. | | | | | | |
| EF1 | W of Longton | Elk | KS | 37.38°N 96.12°W | 23:12–23:14 | 1.2 mi (1.9 km) | 75 yd (69 m) |
| EF1 | Chicken coops and the roof of a home suffered damage. An outbuilding was shifted off its foundation. | | | | | | |
| EFU | WNW of Longton | Elk | KS | 37.39°N 96.11°W | 23:16–23:17 | 0.5 mi (0.80 km) | 25 yd (23 m) |
| EFU | Law enforcement reported a tornado. No damage occurred. | | | | | | |

=== September 22 event ===
List of confirmed tornadoes – Sunday, September 22, 2019
| EF# | Location | County / Parish | State | Start Coord. | Time (UTC) | Path length | Max width |
|---|---|---|---|---|---|---|---|
| EFU | E of Bondurant | Polk | IA | 41.6882°N 93.4278°W | 05:53–05:55 | 1.59 mi (2.56 km) | 25 yd (23 m) |
| EFU | High-resolution satellite data was used to confirm a tornado. | | | | | | |
| EFU | W of Mingo | Jasper | IA | 41.7723°N 93.3182°W | 06:03–06:04 | 0.76 mi (1.22 km) | 25 yd (23 m) |
| EFU | High-resolution satellite data was used to confirm a tornado. | | | | | | |
| EF0 | N of Cockrell | Jackson | MO | 38.9248°N 94.2433°W | 22:29–22:30 | 0.13 mi (0.21 km) | 10 yd (9.1 m) |
| EF0 | A resident videoed a tornado over open country. No damage occurred. | | | | | | |

=== September 23 event ===
List of confirmed tornadoes – Wednesday, September 23, 2019
| EF# | Location | County / Parish | State | Start Coord. | Time (UTC) | Path length | Max width |
|---|---|---|---|---|---|---|---|
| EF0 | New River | Maricopa | AZ | 33.89°N 112.05°W | 19:06–19:08 | 1.03 mi (1.66 km) | 100 yd (91 m) |
| EF0 | A high-end EF0 tracked through New River, damaging roofs and uprooting trees. | | | | | | |
| EF0 | E of Stanfield | Pinal | AZ | 32.87°N 111.88°W | 01:23–01:25 | 0.53 mi (0.85 km) | 50 yd (46 m) |
| EF0 | A trained storm spotter viewed a weak landspout tornado over an open field. No damage occurred. | | | | | | |
| EF1 | NW of Willcox | Cochise | AZ | 32.2682°N 109.8966°W | 04:23–04:26 | 1.71 mi (2.75 km) | 580 yd (530 m) |
| EF1 | A mobile home was lifted and moved off its foundation, and five people inside suffered minor injuries. The roof of a second mobile was ripped off while two other homes and a large machine shed-like storage building suffered damage as well. Several trees and power poles were snapped. | | | | | | |

=== September 24 event ===
List of confirmed tornadoes – Thursday, September 24, 2019
| EF# | Location | County / Parish | State | Start Coord. | Time (UTC) | Path length | Max width |
|---|---|---|---|---|---|---|---|
| EFU | N of Sierra Blanca | Hudspeth | TX | 31.3546°N 105.3635°W | 22:30–22:35 | 0.24 mi (0.39 km) | 10 yd (9.1 m) |
| EFU | Two weak landspout tornadoes were reported. No damage occurred. | | | | | | |
| EFU | S of Holstein | Ida | IA | 42.4127°N 95.5636°W | 22:31–22:32 | 0.02 mi (0.032 km) | 10 yd (9.1 m) |
| EFU | A storm chaser reported a rope tornado in an open field. No damage occurred. | | | | | | |
| EFU | SSE of Holstein | Ida | IA | 42.4311°N 95.5237°W | 22:42–22:44 | 0.67 mi (1.08 km) | 10 yd (9.1 m) |
| EFU | A tornado path was scoured in row crops. | | | | | | |
| EFU | N of Woodbine | Harrison | IA | 41.7957°N 95.6863°W | 22:57–23:00 | 0.05 mi (0.080 km) | 25 yd (23 m) |
| EFU | An emergency manager reported two tornadoes in an open field. No damage occurred. | | | | | | |
| EF3 | Elk Mound to NE of Pine Grove | Dunn, Chippewa | WI | 44.8649°N 91.6908°W | 23:45–23:58 | 6.97 mi (11.22 km) | 725 yd (663 m) |
| EF3 | This large, intense tornado touched down in Elk Mound, where trees were downed and a few homes sustained moderate roof and exterior damage. The most severe damage occurred near the small community of Pine Grove, where multiple homes were severely damaged or destroyed. One poorly anchored frame home was completely leveled, and vehicles were tossed and damaged. Several barns, outbuildings, and large metal shed structures were damaged or destroyed as well, along with some mobile homes. Multiple cinder-block construction self-storage buildings were also destroyed, and many trees were snapped and denuded along the path, a few of which were partially debarked. Three people were injured. | | | | | | |
| EF0 | ESE of Elm Mills | Barber | KS | 37.41°N 98.64°W | 00:23–00:24 | 0.8 mi (1.3 km) | 50 yd (46 m) |
| EF0 | A storm chaser reported a brief rope tornado. | | | | | | |
| EF0 | Lake City | Wabasha | MN | 44.443°N 92.2769°W | 00:58–01:01 | 1.09 mi (1.75 km) | 35 yd (32 m) |
| EF0 | A tornado tracked through Lake City, damaging trees, some building roofs, and dry docked boats near the marina. Several trees fell on homes and mobile homes as well. | | | | | | |
| EF1 | S of Greenwood | Clark | WI | 44.711°N 90.6427°W | 02:26–02:31 | 4.69 mi (7.55 km) | 60 yd (55 m) |
| EF1 | This tornado produced damage to trees, barns, and silos. At least three cows were killed at a farm. | | | | | | |

=== September 25 event ===
List of confirmed tornadoes – Friday, September 25, 2019
| EF# | Location | County / Parish | State | Start Coord. | Time (UTC) | Path length | Max width |
|---|---|---|---|---|---|---|---|
| EF0 | W of Casa Grande | Maricopa | AZ | 32.87°N 111.88°W | 01:23–01:25 | 0.67 mi (1.08 km) | 50 yd (46 m) |
| EF0 | A trained storm spotter sighted a landspout tornado. No damage occurred. | | | | | | |

=== September 27 event ===
List of confirmed tornadoes – Sunday, September 27, 2019
| EF# | Location | County / Parish | State | Start Coord. | Time (UTC) | Path length | Max width |
|---|---|---|---|---|---|---|---|
| EF0 | NE of Overbrook | Osage | KS | 38.8046°N 95.5201°W | 00:56–00:58 | 0.19 mi (0.31 km) | 50 yd (46 m) |
| EF0 | A tornado hit a house, tossing a large satellite dish that was bolted to a concrete pad into a cornfield. Large tree limbs were damaged, one of which fell onto the house's roof. | | | | | | |
| EF0 | N of Breeds | Fulton | IL | 40.5804°N 89.9402°W | 01:22–01:27 | 1.88 mi (3.03 km) | 100 yd (91 m) |
| EF0 | Several homes and a church suffered minor roof damage. Power poles and numerous trees were downed. | | | | | | |

=== September 28 event ===
List of confirmed tornadoes – Monday, September 28, 2019
| EF# | Location | County / Parish | State | Start Coord. | Time (UTC) | Path length | Max width |
|---|---|---|---|---|---|---|---|
| EF0 | N of Davis | Yolo | CA | 38.579°N 121.75°W | 00:37–00:50 | 1.7 mi (2.7 km) | 1 yd (0.91 m) |
| EF0 | A tornado was caught on video from multiple angles. It remained over open fields and caused no damage. | | | | | | |

=== September 29 event ===
List of confirmed tornadoes – Tuesday, September 29, 2019
| EF# | Location | County / Parish | State | Start Coord. | Time (UTC) | Path length | Max width |
|---|---|---|---|---|---|---|---|
| EF0 | N of Emden | Logan | IL | 40.3071°N 89.5167°W | 21:18–21:26 | 2.73 mi (4.39 km) | 50 yd (46 m) |
| EF0 | Tree limbs and crops were damaged. | | | | | | |

=== September 30 event ===
List of confirmed tornadoes – Wednesday, September 30, 2019
| EF# | Location | County / Parish | State | Start Coord. | Time (UTC) | Path length | Max width |
|---|---|---|---|---|---|---|---|
| EF0 | NE of Bayamón | Bayamón | PR | 18.4058°N 66.153°W | 17:30 | 0.1 mi (0.16 km) | 5 yd (4.6 m) |
| EF0 | A brief tornado was videoed. No damage occurred. No damage occurred. | | | | | | |

== October ==
Confirmed tornadoes by Enhanced Fujita rating
| EFU | EF0 | EF1 | EF2 | EF3 | EF4 | EF5 | Total |
|---|---|---|---|---|---|---|---|
| 4 | 23 | 31 | 4 | 1 | 0 | 0 | 63 |

=== October 1 event ===
List of confirmed tornadoes – Tuesday, October 1, 2019
| EF# | Location | County / Parish | State | Start Coord. | Time (UTC) | Path length | Max width |
|---|---|---|---|---|---|---|---|
| EFU | S of Red Oak | Montgomery | IA | 41°N 95.23°W | 20:25 | 0.01 mi (0.016 km) | 50 yd (46 m) |
| EFU | Emergency management reported a very brief tornado. No damage occurred. | | | | | | |
| EFU | E of Shenandoah | Page | IA | 40.76°N 95.32°W | 20:35 | 0.01 mi (0.016 km) | 50 yd (46 m) |
| EFU | A storm chaser reported a brief tornado. No damage occurred. | | | | | | |
| EF0 | SE of Rockdale | Jefferson | WI | 42.9327°N 88.9677°W | 02:25–02:34 | 7.14 mi (11.49 km) | 80 yd (73 m) |
| EF0 | The roof was peeled off a barn, and multiple trees were uprooted, at least partially due to saturated grounds. | | | | | | |
| EF1 | SW of Sullivan to S of Wales | Jefferson, Waukesha | WI | 42.9935°N 88.6273°W | 02:42–02:56 | 12.83 mi (20.65 km) | 100 yd (91 m) |
| EF1 | A house sustained roof and siding damage, and garage had its door blown in and a wall pushed outward. A shed and numerous trees were extensively damaged as well. | | | | | | |

=== October 2 event ===
List of confirmed tornadoes – Wednesday, October 2, 2019
| EF# | Location | County / Parish | State | Start Coord. | Time (UTC) | Path length | Max width |
|---|---|---|---|---|---|---|---|
| EF0 | Portsmouth | Newport | RI | 41.5916°N 71.2481°W | 20:45–20:46 | 0.25 mi (0.40 km) | 60 yd (55 m) |
| EF0 | A brief tornado snapped or uprooted trees in Portsmouth, in addition to damaging the wall of a garage that was bowed out. | | | | | | |

=== October 4 event ===
List of confirmed tornadoes – Friday, October 4, 2019
| EF# | Location | County / Parish | State | Start Coord. | Time (UTC) | Path length | Max width |
|---|---|---|---|---|---|---|---|
| EFU | WSW of Tenino | Thurston | WA | 46.85°N 122.8807°W | 21:57–21:58 | 0.05 mi (0.080 km) | 20 yd (18 m) |
| EFU | A brief and weak tornado was videoed. No damage occurred. | | | | | | |

=== October 8 event ===
List of confirmed tornadoes – Tuesday, October 8, 2019
| EF# | Location | County / Parish | State | Start Coord. | Time (UTC) | Path length | Max width |
|---|---|---|---|---|---|---|---|
| EFU | NE of Hermanas | Luna | NM | 31.94°N 107.86°W | 23:08–23:10 | 0.18 mi (0.29 km) | 10 yd (9.1 m) |
| EFU | A weather spotter photographed a tornado. No damage occurred. | | | | | | |

=== October 16 event ===
List of confirmed tornadoes – Wednesday, October 16, 2019
| EF# | Location | County / Parish | State | Start Coord. | Time (UTC) | Path length | Max width |
|---|---|---|---|---|---|---|---|
| EF1 | NW of Iowa | Calcasieu | LA | 30.3095°N 93.0709°W | 07:42–07:47 | 2.74 mi (4.41 km) | 100 yd (91 m) |
| EF1 | A front porch awning was ripped off a home, a portable building was rolled over, and an RV was tossed onto a house, causing considerable roof and wall damage. Two barns on the same property lost their roofs. A large, sturdy portable building was pushed off its pilings and had its roof ripped off. A neighboring mobile home lost a portion of its roof too. Numerous trees were snapped. | | | | | | |

=== October 18 event ===
Florida events were associated with Tropical Storm Nestor.

List of confirmed tornadoes – Friday, October 18, 2019
| EF# | Location | County / Parish | State | Start Coord. | Time (UTC) | Path length | Max width |
|---|---|---|---|---|---|---|---|
| EF0 | Seminole | Pinellas | FL | 27.8397°N 82.7913°W | 01:29–01:32 | 0.34 mi (0.55 km) | 30 yd (27 m) |
| EF0 | Several mobile homes in Seminole suffered roof, window, and carport damage. Several trees were downed as well. | | | | | | |
| EF1 | ENE of Shelton | Mason | WA | 47.2696°N 122.9422°W | 02:02–02:07 | 0.68 mi (1.09 km) | 90 yd (82 m) |
| EF1 | An EF1 tornado mainly snapped and uprooted trees, some of which fell on homes. | | | | | | |
| EF2 | W of Lakeland to Kathleen | Polk | FL | 27.982°N 82.0475°W | 02:59–03:28 | 11.45 mi (18.43 km) | 525 yd (480 m) |
| EF2 | A large and strong tornado destroyed one home while damaging the roofs, fascia, awnings, and screen enclosures of numerous others. Kathleen Middle School sustained significant roof damage. Fences and trees were downed, a camper was tossed into a residence, and a tractor trailer was overturned. | | | | | | |

=== October 19 event ===
Events were associated with Tropical Storm Nestor.

List of confirmed tornadoes – Saturday, October 19, 2019
| EF# | Location | County / Parish | State | Start Coord. | Time (UTC) | Path length | Max width |
|---|---|---|---|---|---|---|---|
| EF1 | Northwestern Cape Coral | Lee | FL | 26.6796°N 82.0255°W | 10:45–10:47 | 1.08 mi (1.74 km) | 100 yd (91 m) |
| EF1 | 18 homes were damaged due to partial roof damage, and/or fascia, siding, and awnings being blown off. Several vehicles were also damaged, including a couple cars were totaled after being rolled. | | | | | | |
| EF0 | SSW of Micco | Brevard | FL | 27.65°N 80.57°W | 18:50 | 0.05 mi (0.080 km) | 10 yd (9.1 m) |
| EF0 | An off-duty NHC employee reported a brief landspout tornado over an open field. No damage was found. | | | | | | |
| EF0 | NW of Cordele | Crisp | GA | 31.9852°N 83.7954°W | 22:58–23:03 | 1.96 mi (3.15 km) | 100 yd (91 m) |
| EF0 | A shed was shifted off its blocks, an industrial building had part of its metal roof lifted off, and several trees were downed. | | | | | | |

=== October 20 event ===
South Carolina event was associated with Tropical Storm Nestor.

List of confirmed tornadoes – Sunday, October 20, 2019
| EF# | Location | County / Parish | State | Start Coord. | Time (UTC) | Path length | Max width |
|---|---|---|---|---|---|---|---|
| EF0 | W of Myrtle Beach | Horry | SC | 33.6810°N 78.8975°W | 05:52–05:55 | 0.87 mi (1.40 km) | 25 yd (23 m) |
| EF0 | Numerous trees were snapped or uprooted. Large sections of fallen oak trees caused significant damage to two mobile homes. | | | | | | |
| EF0 | SW of Beckville | Panola | TX | 32.1470°N 94.5443°W | 00:36–00:38 | 0.8 mi (1.3 km) | 150 yd (140 m) |
| EF0 | Several trees were snapped or uprooted. A home's roof was damaged. | | | | | | |
| EF1 | SSE of Greenwood | Caddo | LA | 32.3738°N 93.976°W | 01:42–01:49 | 3.59 mi (5.78 km) | 350 yd (320 m) |
| EF1 | A greenhouse was destroyed, shingled were ripped off the roofs of two homes, and an RV trailer was rolled onto its side. Numerous trees were snapped or uprooted. | | | | | | |
| EF3 | Northern Dallas to Richardson | Dallas | TX | 32.8685°N 96.9149°W | 01:58–02:30 | 15.76 mi (25.36 km) | 1,300 yd (1,200 m) |
| EF3 | See article on this tornado | | | | | | |
| EF1 | N of Midlothian | Ellis | TX | 32.4981°N 96.9935°W | 02:10–02:15 | 2.83 mi (4.55 km) | 350 yd (320 m) |
| EF1 | Several church and retail buildings had their roofs damaged and windows blown out. One structure attached to the church was severely damaged as most of its roof was ripped off, and its south-facing wall was collapsed. Two buildings had sheet metal peeled away, while one of the structures had its metal roof purlins bent. Several homes suffered significant roof damage and had windows blown out, one of which had its garage door collapsed. Trees were snapped or uprooted as well. | | | | | | |
| EF2 | Garland | Dallas | TX | 32.8974°N 96.6753°W | 02:24–02:30 | 2.48 mi (3.99 km) | 265 yd (242 m) |
| EF2 | This high-end tornado caused significant damage in Garland. A wide section of the roof to a Sear's Facility warehouse was peeled off, tearing away the adjacent metal walls and causing some of the interior support columns and beams to bend. An empty 18-wheeler and a van were tipped onto their sides. Nearby, a newly built warehouse collapsed as its support columns were bent to the ground. debris from this structure caused additional damage to nearby homes. Along the remainder of the tornado path, numerous homes were heavily damaged, some of which had their roofs torn off. Many trees were snapped or uprooted as well. | | | | | | |
| EF1 | Rowlett to Wylie | Dallas | TX | 32.9237°N 96.5697°W | 02:36–02:45 | 6.02 mi (9.69 km) | 500 yd (460 m) |
| EF1 | This high-end EF1 tornado moved through residential areas, damaging numerous homes. Some homes had large portions of their roofs torn off. Several outbuildings were also damaged or destroyed, and trees were downed. | | | | | | |
| EF0 | W of Ferris | Ellis | TX | 32.5332°N 96.6664°W | 02:42–02:44 | 0.18 mi (0.29 km) | 170 yd (160 m) |
| EF0 | A silo was damaged and partially collapsed, multiple businesses sustained roof damage, a power pole was downed, and trees were snapped or uprooted. | | | | | | |
| EF1 | Rockwall | Rockwall | TX | 32.9312°N 96.4864°W | 02:48–02:54 | 1.96 mi (3.15 km) | 100 yd (91 m) |
| EF1 | Several homes suffered significant roof damage. Trees and fences were downed. | | | | | | |
| EF1 | S of Asher | Pontotoc | OK | 34.91°N 96.92°W | 03:01–03:02 | 0.25 mi (0.40 km) | 150 yd (140 m) |
| EF1 | A barn was destroyed, and a few other farm buildings were damaged. | | | | | | |
| EF1 | ENE of Konawa | Seminole | OK | 34.98°N 96.70°W | 03:12–03:15 | 2.8 mi (4.5 km) | 100 yd (91 m) |
| EF1 | Several wooden power poles were snapped, and trees were damaged. | | | | | | |
| EF0 | N of Kaufman | Kaufman | TX | 32.6661°N 96.3241°W | 03:27–03:28 | 0.13 mi (0.21 km) | 50 yd (46 m) |
| EF0 | A home lost a portion of its metal roofing. A nearby power pole was partially snapped. | | | | | | |
| EF1 | SE of Elmo | Kaufman | TX | 32.6708°N 96.1393°W | 03:39–03:41 | 0.53 mi (0.85 km) | 500 yd (460 m) |
| EF1 | Sheet metal was ripped from an outbuilding, two power poles were snapped, and a metal barn was severely damaged, with its metal roof almost completely ripped off and its steel trusses severely bent. Several large trees were snapped or damaged. A personal weather station measured a wind gust of 100 miles per hour (160 km/h). | | | | | | |
| EF0 | N of Wills Point | Van Zandt | TX | 32.7353°N 96.0054°W | 03:59–04:04 | 0.63 mi (1.01 km) | 200 yd (180 m) |
| EF0 | Multiple roofs sustained damaged. Multiple sheds and carports were overturned and damaged. A few small trees were uprooted and tree branches were broken. | | | | | | |
| EF1 | E of Coweta | Wagoner | OK | 35.9436°N 95.5608°W | 04:08–04:15 | 7.2 mi (11.6 km) | 1,100 yd (1,000 m) |
| EF1 | A home was damaged, and trees and power poles were toppled. | | | | | | |
| EF1 | N of Wainwright | Muskogee | OK | 35.6351°N 95.6311°W | 04:12–04:22 | 8.3 mi (13.4 km) | 400 yd (370 m) |
| EF1 | A couple of trees were snapped or uprooted and a power pole was blown down. | | | | | | |
| EF1 | NW of Scraper | Cherokee | OK | 36.1189°N 94.9665°W | 04:39–04:43 | 2.9 mi (4.7 km) | 600 yd (550 m) |
| EF1 | Numerous trees were snapped or uprooted. | | | | | | |

=== October 21 event ===
List of confirmed tornadoes – Monday, October 21, 2019
| EF# | Location | County / Parish | State | Start Coord. | Time (UTC) | Path length | Max width | Summary |
|---|---|---|---|---|---|---|---|---|
| EF1 | NW of Watts to SE of Siloam Springs | Adair (OK), Benton (AR) | OK, AR | 36.1410°N 94.6644°W | 05:00–05:09 | 9.1 mi (14.6 km) | 900 yd (820 m) | Outbuildings were destroyed, homes were damaged, power poles were snapped, and numerous trees were uprooted. |
| EF2 | Southeastern Siloam Springs to Rogers | Benton | AR | 36.1778°N 94.5310°W | 05:08–05:38 | 31.4 mi (50.5 km) | 2,640 yd (2,410 m) | This extremely large, long-tracked, wedge tornado touched down on the southeastern side of Siloam Springs as the previous tornado was dissipating just to its south. It initially moved east-northeastward at EF1 intensity in the vicinity of AR 264, AR 16, AR 16S and US 412/AR 59, inflicting roof damage to outbuildings and damaging or uprooting trees. Hangars at Smith Field were damaged; the roof was blown off a business, and several other businesses were damaged. On the east side of the city, numerous homes suffered roof damage. The tornado continued to the northeast of town, crested a hill, and reached its peak intensity of EF2 shortly thereafter. Well-built outbuildings were destroyed, a house had its roof torn off, and other homes were damaged and had windows blown out. The tornado then continued at EF1 strength, damaging a metal building system and snapping or uprooting trees. More trees and metal building systems were damaged as the tornado continued east-northeastward. The tornado then moved near Highfill, Northwest Arkansas National Airport, and Cave Springs, uprooting more trees as it crossed AR 264 and AR 112. The tornado then entered the southern part of Rogers, uprooting trees and damaging an Embassy Suites. It then crossed I-49/US 71 and moved through the southern and eastern part of the downtown area, crossing US 71B/AR 94 and AR 265. Numerous homes and businesses were damaged, and trees were uprooted. The tornado then caused decreasing levels of tree damage before dissipating over Beaver Lake shortly after crossing AR 12. |
| EF0 | Northwestern Allen | Collin | TX | 33.1169°N 96.7272°W | 05:22–05:27 | 4.8 mi (7.7 km) | 500 yd (460 m) | Shingles were ripped off a number of residences, and a number of other homes sustained roof and facade damage. Wood fencing and a stone wall was blown down, and large trees were snapped. |
| EF0 | SSE of Battlefield | Christian, Greene | MO | 37.0814°N 93.4471°W | 05:57–06:04 | 4.72 mi (7.60 km) | 100 yd (91 m) | Numerous trees were snapped, four metal power poles and power lines were downed, and a home sustained damage to its roof, gutters, and vinyl siding. |
| EF1 | Highlandville | Christian | MO | 36.9383°N 93.2845°W | 06:03–06:16 | 11.88 mi (19.12 km) | 150 yd (140 m) | This tornado uprooted or snapped dozens of trees. |
| EF0 | Southeastern Springfield | Greene | MO | 37.1486°N 93.2225°W | 06:11–06:15 | 1.41 mi (2.27 km) | 20 yd (18 m) | Large tree limbs were snapped, a few street signs were bent, and an aluminum fence was damaged. A home suffered minor roof damage too. |
| EF1 | Southeast of Rogersville | Christian, Webster | MO | 37.0573°N 93.0693°W | 06:18–06:28 | 6.29 mi (10.12 km) | 250 yd (230 m) | Along the path numerous trees were uprooted or broken along with numerous outbuildings damaged or destroyed. |
| EF1 | W of Gentryville | Douglas | MO | 36.853°N 92.4388°W | 07:06–07:21 | 16.32 mi (26.26 km) | 450 yd (410 m) | Hundreds or thousands of trees were snapped or destroyed. One outbuilding was destroyed and several others were damaged. |
| EF1 | NW of Sycamore to NE of Dora | Ozark, Douglas | MO | 36.7464°N 92.3107°W | 07:13–07:25 | 12.94 mi (20.82 km) | 450 yd (410 m) | Numerous outbuildings and trees were heavily damaged. Two mobile homes were also damaged, including one that lost its roof and was pulled off its foundation. |
| EF0 | WSW of Willow Springs | Howell | MO | 36.9715°N 92.0525°W | 07:30–07:31 | 0.11 mi (0.18 km) | 50 yd (46 m) | Several trees were snapped or uprooted. |
| EF1 | WNW of Licking | Texas | MO | 37.5017°N 91.8896°W | 07:46–07:50 | 1.11 mi (1.79 km) | 450 yd (410 m) | Dozens of trees were snapped or uprooted. Several homes and outbuildings sustained minor damage. A mobile home was overturned. |
| EF1 | SSW of Douglassville | Cass | TX | 33.1039°N 94.4987°W | 08:08–08:21 | 9.09 mi (14.63 km) | 150 yd (140 m) | The roof was torn off a very small shed, and some tin roofing material from an unknown location was wrapped around some trees. Otherwise, the remainder of the damage was to trees. |
| EF1 | S of Taylor | Lafayette, Columbia | AR | 33.0262°N 93.495°W | 09:21–09:28 | 5.34 mi (8.59 km) | 300 yd (270 m) | The roof and siding was partially removed from an outbuilding. The roofs of two homes were partially removed. A few trees were snapped. |
| EF1 | Tyronza | Poinsett | AR | 35.4827°N 90.3644°W | 10:50–10:53 | 1.11 mi (1.79 km) | 125 yd (114 m) | Several outbuildings were destroyed, a convenience store and an elementary school were damaged, and numerous trees were toppled. Three people were injured. |
| EF0 | NW of Munford | Tipton (TN), Mississippi (AR) | TN, AR | 35.5095°N 89.9776°W | 11:20–11:31 | 7.6 mi (12.2 km) | 200 yd (180 m) | Several outbuildings were destroyed, a convenience store and an elementary school were damaged, and numerous trees were toppled. Three people were injured. |
| EF1 | Memphis | Shelby | TN | 35.0452°N 89.9839°W | 11:34–11:43 | 7.42 mi (11.94 km) | 250 yd (230 m) | Significant roof damage was inflicted to an apartment complex. Numerous trees and business signs were downed. |
| EF0 | SW of Ripley | Lauderdale | TN | 35.6811°N 89.6854°W | 11:44–11:52 | 7.31 mi (11.76 km) | 200 yd (180 m) | Trees were snapped or uprooted. One home sustained minor roof damage. |
| EF0 | Geismar | Ascension | LA | 30.2194°N 91.0336°W | 18:00–18:01 | 0.06 mi (0.097 km) | 15 yd (14 m) | Roofing material was blown off a small warehouse building and tossed 50 yd (46 m). The flying debris also inflicted further damage to a larger warehouse building that also saw some its sheet metal ripped from its outside walls. One person was injured by flying debris. |

=== October 22 event ===
List of confirmed tornadoes – Tuesday, October 22, 2019
| EF# | Location | County / Parish | State | Start Coord. | Time (UTC) | Path length | Max width | Summary |
|---|---|---|---|---|---|---|---|---|
| EF0 | E of Cornelius | Cabarrus | NC | 35.481°N 80.77°W | 16:57–16:59 | 0.26 mi (0.42 km) | 50 yd (46 m) | Multiple trees were snapped or uprooted. Some beehives were overturned. |
| EF0 | NE of Vanceboro | Craven | NC | 35.3508°N 77.1258°W | 23:43–23:44 | 0.04 mi (0.064 km) | 40 yd (37 m) | Several trees were snapped or uprooted. A home suffered very minor roof damage and porch furniture was blown around. |

=== October 25 event ===
List of confirmed tornadoes – Friday, October 25, 2019
| EF# | Location | County / Parish | State | Start Coord. | Time (UTC) | Path length | Max width |
|---|---|---|---|---|---|---|---|
| EF1 | N of Hawthorn | Washington | AL | 31.37°N 88.11°W | 18:59–19:00 | 0.19 mi (0.31 km) | 95 yd (87 m) |
| EF1 | In November 2023, a new tornado was found from Planet and Worldview satellite imagery. Multiple trees were uprooted in a convergent pattern. | | | | | | |
| EF1 | Western Mobile (1st tornado) | Mobile | AL | 30.6144°N 88.2686°W | 21:12–21:14 | 1.34 mi (2.16 km) | 75 yd (69 m) |
| EF1 | This tornado caused significant tree and roof damage in the Spring Brook Farms subdivision in the western fringes of Mobile. | | | | | | |
| EF0 | Western Mobile (2nd tornado) | Mobile | AL | 30.6698°N 88.2714°W | 21:19–21:20 | 0.09 mi (0.14 km) | 25 yd (23 m) |
| EF0 | This brief tornado formed quickly after the previous EF1 tornado. It damaged the metal roof of a storage facility. | | | | | | |
| EF1 | NW of Semmes | Mobile | AL | 30.7973°N 88.2730°W | 21:37–21:42 | 3.31 mi (5.33 km) | 100 yd (91 m) |
| EF1 | A tornado caused extensive damage to trees and additional damage at a mobile home park. | | | | | | |
| EF1 | SW of Thomasville | Clarke | AL | 31.858°N 87.7695°W | 00:39–00:41 | 1.78 mi (2.86 km) | 100 yd (91 m) |
| EF1 | Significant roof damage was inflicted to two homes. Extensive tree damage was observed. In November 2023, this tornado underwent reanalysis and had its path extended further north. | | | | | | |

=== October 31 event ===
List of confirmed tornadoes – Thursday, October 31, 2019
| EF# | Location | County / Parish | State | Start Coord. | Time (UTC) | Path length | Max width |
|---|---|---|---|---|---|---|---|
| EF0 | NE of Tazewell | Claiborne | TN | 36.47°N 83.56°W | 15:45 | 1.5 mi (2.4 km) | 200 yd (180 m) |
| EF0 | Damage from the tornado was initially intermittent before becoming more continuous. Numerous trees were damaged, downed, or uprooted. A couple barns or outbuildings collapsed, while other structures mostly sustained roof damage. | | | | | | |
| EF1 | NE of Gilbert | Lexington | SC | 33.9355°N 81.3702°W | 21:59–22:00 | 1.14 mi (1.83 km) | 50 yd (46 m) |
| EF1 | The tornado downed large tree limbs, uprooted a tree, and snapped a couple of softwood trees approximately 20 to 30 feet off the ground. | | | | | | |
| EF1 | WSW of Lexington | Lexington | SC | 33.9596°N 81.3109°W | 22:02–22:03 | 0.47 mi (0.76 km) | 100 yd (91 m) |
| EF1 | This tornado snapped or uprooted nearly 2 dozen trees at a farm. A small wooden building at the farm lost a large portion of its metal roof. | | | | | | |
| EF0 | E of Timberville | Rockingham | VA | 38.6366°N 78.7140°W | 22:04–22:05 | 0.54 mi (0.87 km) | 25 yd (23 m) |
| EF0 | A brief tornado destroyed a barn, and piece of lumber from the structure was impaled through the windshield of an SUV, which also had its hood lifted up. A small shed was also destroyed. A small tree was uprooted and other trees sustained substantial damage to their upper limbs. Corn stalks were flattened as well. | | | | | | |
| EF0 | Lexington | Lexington | SC | 33.9873°N 81.2306°W | 22:09–22:10 | 0.07 mi (0.11 km) | 50 yd (46 m) |
| EF0 | A large hardwood tree was snapped and took down a power line. Another small hardwood tree was snapped about 30 feet off the ground. There were several large limbs that came down on a power line, and portions of a wooden fence were blown over. | | | | | | |
| EF1 | SW of Buffalo Springs | Mecklenburg | VA | 36.6103°N 78.7111°W | 23:48–23:58 | 4.47 mi (7.19 km) | 100 yd (91 m) |
| EF1 | The tornado snapped and uprooted numerous trees, and destroyed or inflicted severe roof damage to many small barns and outbuildings. Only minor roof and gutter damage occurred to homes. | | | | | | |
| EF2 | Glen Mills | Delaware | PA | 39.9150°N 75.5202°W | 03:25–03:26 | 0.47 mi (0.76 km) | 250 yd (230 m) |
| EF2 | Three homes in a subdivision in Glen Mills were heavily damaged, and other homes sustained lesser damage. Two greenhouses were destroyed, and numerous large trees were snapped and uprooted, some of which landed on homes. | | | | | | |

== See also ==
- Tornadoes of 2019
- List of United States tornadoes from June to August 2019
- List of United States tornadoes from November to December 2019
