= National City =

National City may refer to:

== Places in the United States of America ==
- National City, California
- National City, Illinois
- National City, Michigan
- National City Christian Church, historic church in Washington, DC
- Bristol Wells Town Site (National City, Nevada), a ghost town now known as Bristol Wells

== Banks ==
- National City Corp., a bank formerly headquartered in Cleveland, Ohio
  - National City acquisition by PNC
- National City Bank of New York, the precursor of Citibank

== Companies ==
- National City Lines, a holding company for streetcar and bus lines in the United States

== Fiction ==
- National City (DC Comics), a fictional city in DC Comics which is the home of Supergirl in both the comics and TV series of the same name

== See also ==
- Capital city
