= Bristol station =

Bristol station may refer to:

== United Kingdom ==
- Bristol Temple Meads railway station, the main railway station in central Bristol
- Bristol Parkway railway station, in the northern suburbs of Bristol
- Bristol St Philip's railway station, former small terminus station in Bristol
- Bristol Brabazon railway station, under construction
- Bristol bus station, Bristol's main bus and coach station

== United States ==
- Bristol station (SEPTA), in Bristol, Pennsylvania
- Bristol station (Virginia), a historic railroad station in Bristol, Virginia

== See also ==
- Bristol (disambiguation)
