= Bristol County =

Bristol County may refer to:

== Places ==
- Bristol County, Massachusetts, United States
- Bristol County, Rhode Island, United States
- Bristol, a ceremonial county in England

== Other uses ==
- USS Bristol County (LST-1198), a US Navy Newport class tank landing ship
