= Bristol College =

Bristol College may refer to:

- City of Bristol College, Bristol, UK
- Bristol College, an Episcopal college at, Bristol, Pennsylvania, active between 1833 and 1837
- University College, Bristol
- Trinity College, Bristol
- Wesley College, Bristol
- Bristol Community College, a community college in Massachusetts

== See also ==
Category:Further education colleges in Bristol
