= Bristol Head =

Mountain in Colorado, United States

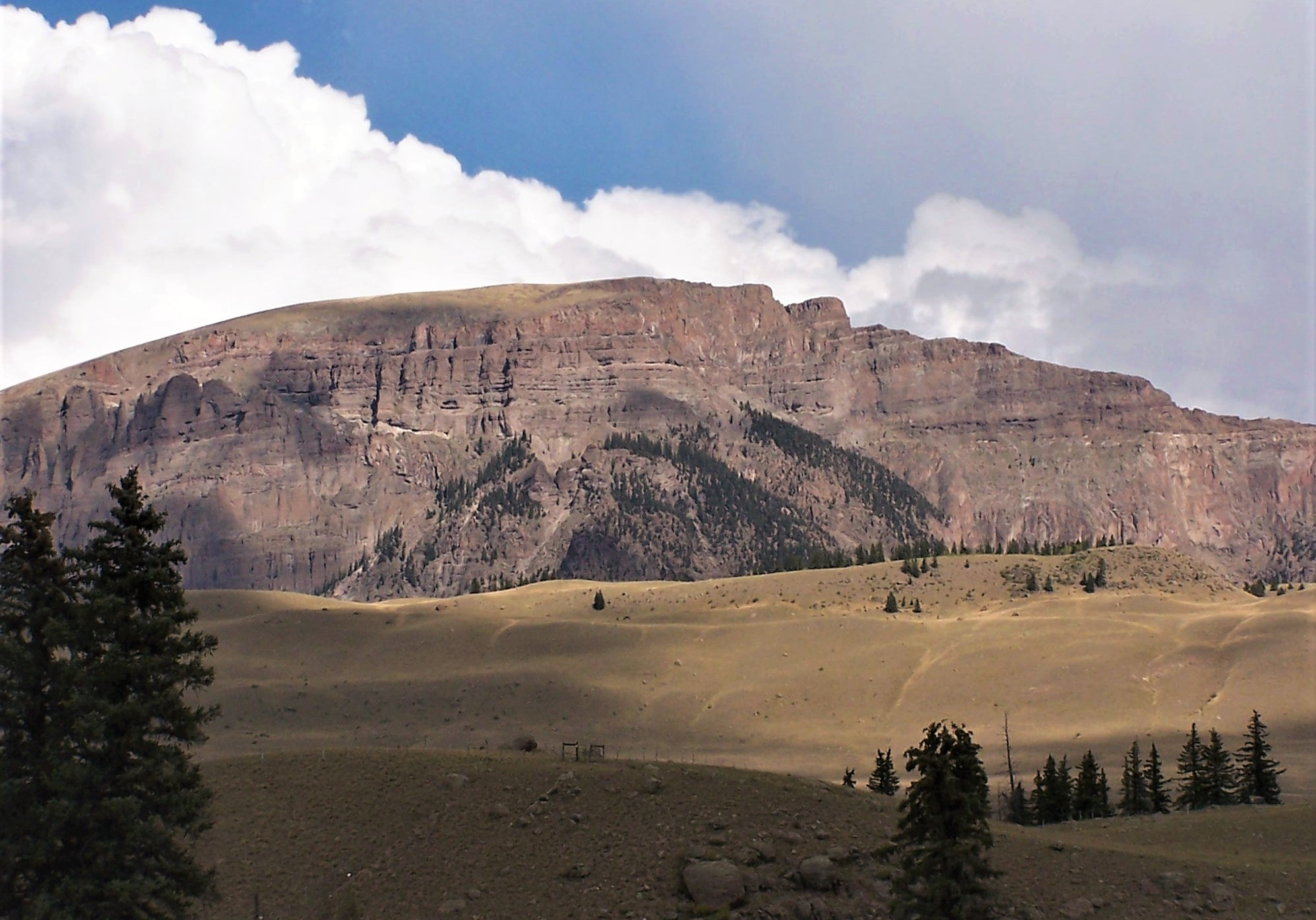
- Southwest aspect

Highest point
- Elevation: 12,712 ft (3,875 m)
- Prominence: 1,201 ft (366 m)
- Parent peak: Table Mountain (12,867 ft)
- Isolation: 7.26 mi (11.68 km)
- Coordinates: 37°47′37″N 107°03′18″W

Geography
- Location within Colorado Location within the United States
- Country: United States
- State: Colorado
- County: Mineral
- Protected area: Rio Grande National Forest
- Parent range: Rocky Mountains; San Juan Mountains
- Topo map: USGS Bristol Head

Geology
- Rock age: Tertiary
- Rock type(s): Dacitic lava, Breccia, Rhyolite

Climbing
- Easiest route: class 1 hiking

Bristol Head is a 12,712-foot-elevation (3,875-meter) mountain summit in Mineral County, Colorado, United States.

== Description ==
Bristol Head is located eight miles (13 km) southwest of the community of Creede, on land managed by Rio Grande National Forest. It is situated east of the Continental Divide in the San Juan Mountains which are a subrange of the Rocky Mountains. Precipitation runoff from the mountain drains into the Rio Grande and topographic relief is significant as the summit rises 3,900 feet (1,200 meters) above the river in three miles (4.8 km) and 3,250 feet (990 meters) above Santa Maria Reservoir in 1.2 mile (1.9 km). Access to the summit is via a 15-mile 4WD road which reaches a radio repeater at the top. The mountain's toponym has been officially adopted by the United States Board on Geographic Names, and was recorded in publications as early as 1876 since the peak served as a triangulation station for the Wheeler Survey.

== Climate ==
According to the Köppen climate classification system, Bristol Head is located in an alpine subarctic climate zone with cold, snowy winters, and cool to warm summers. Due to its altitude, it receives precipitation all year, as snow in winter and as thunderstorms in summer, with a dry period in late spring. Hikers can expect afternoon rain, hail, and lightning from the seasonal monsoon in late July and August.

== Gallery ==
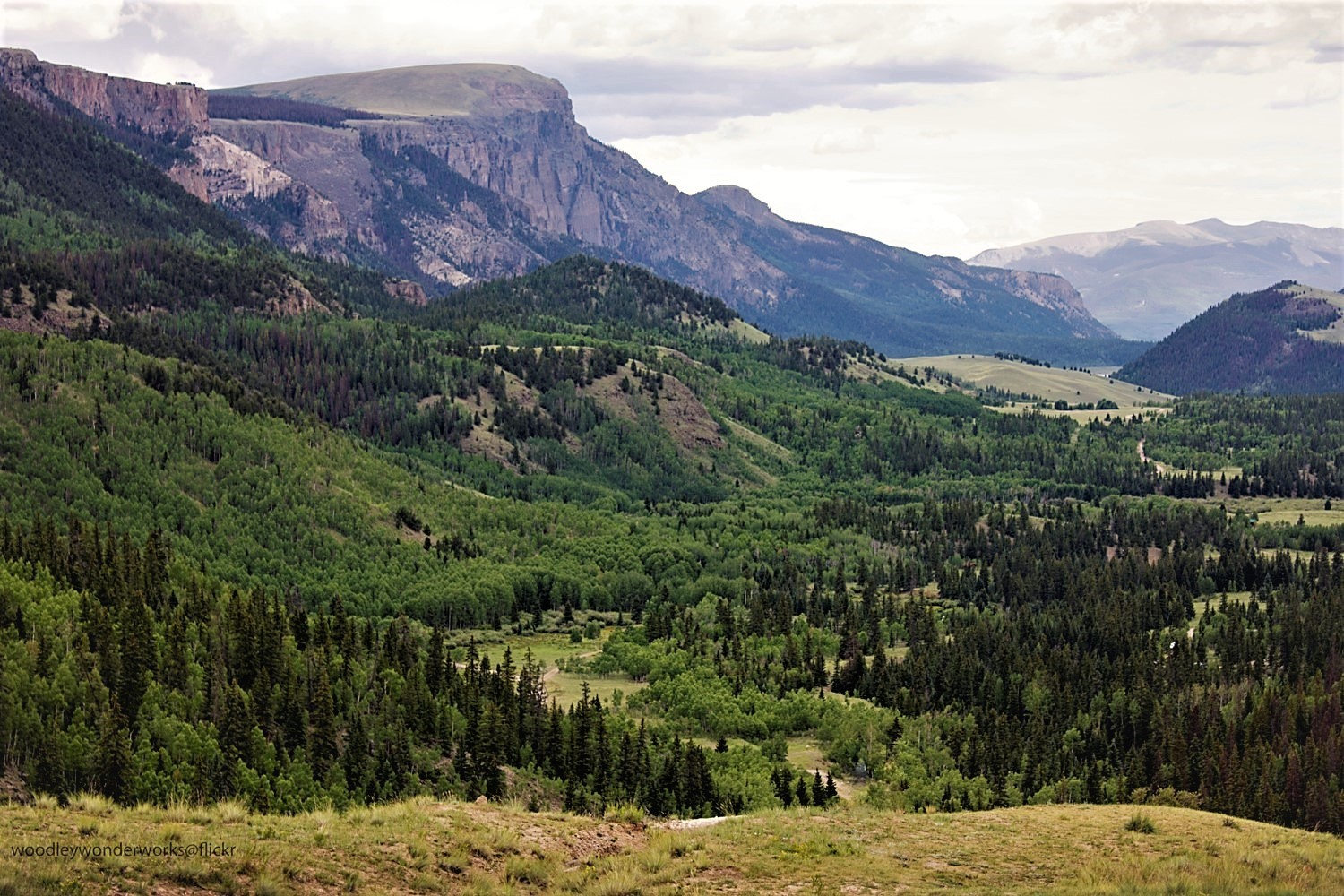
Northwest aspect viewed from North Clear Creek Falls overlook

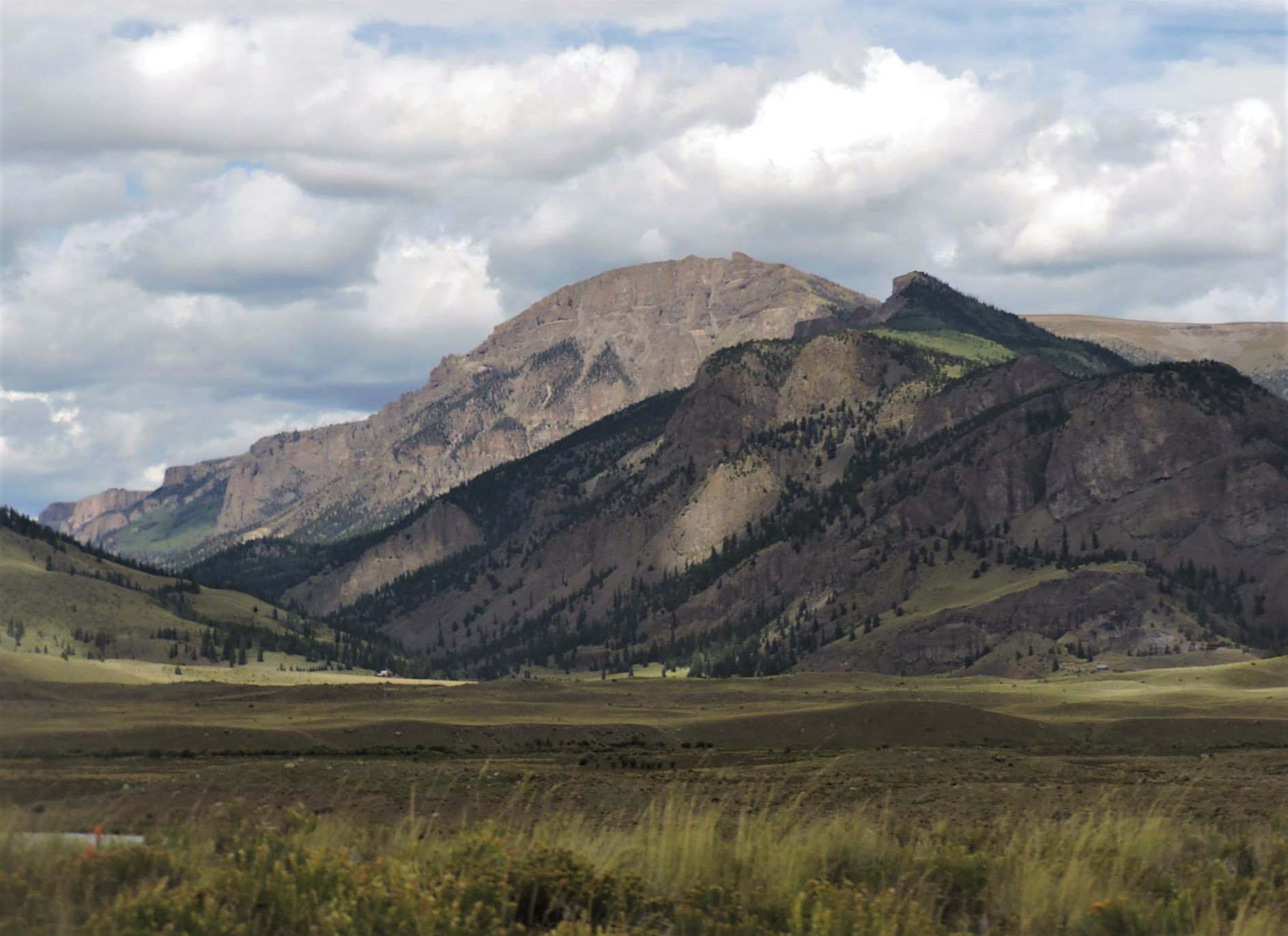
South aspect

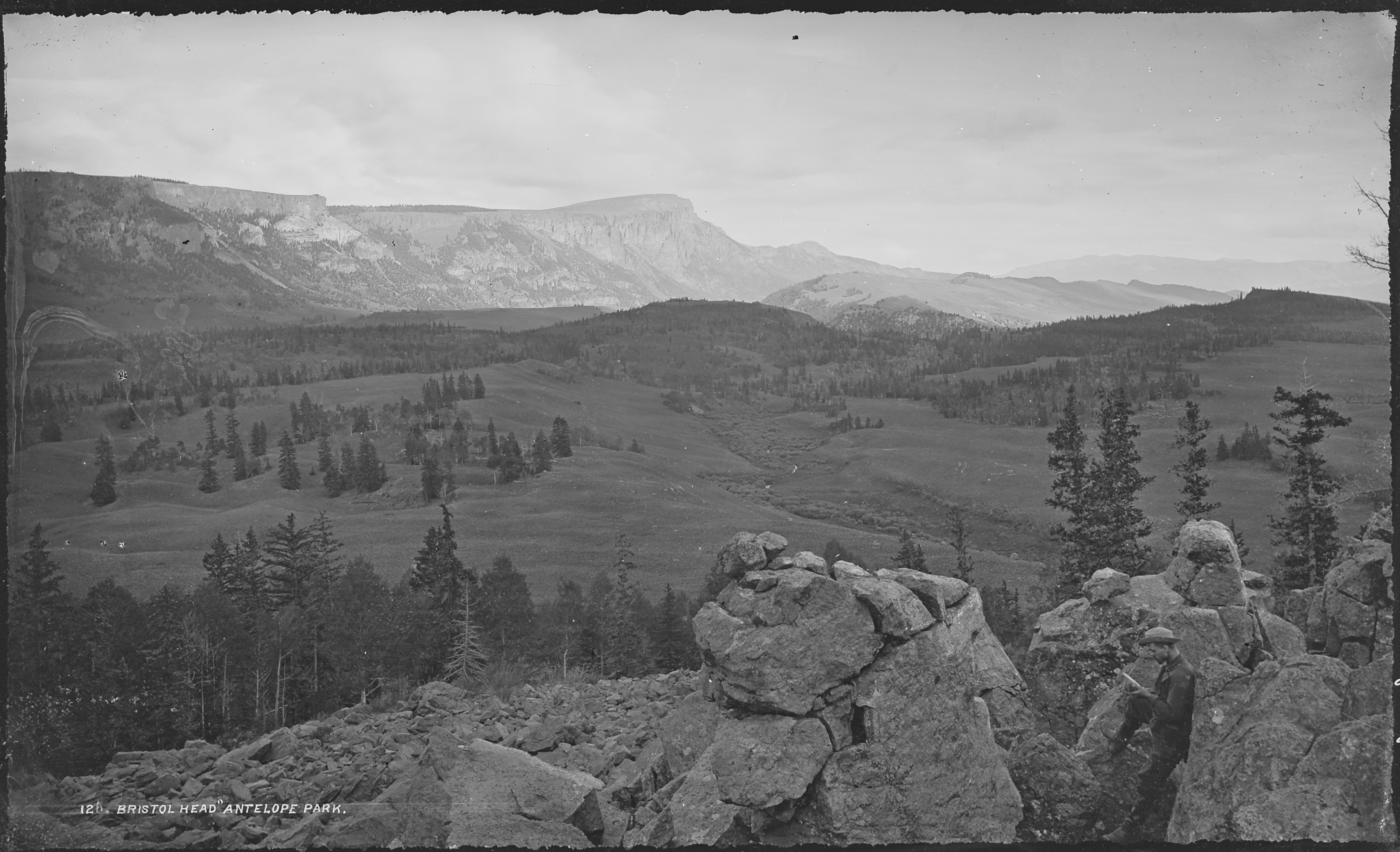
Bristol Head in 1874 by William Henry Jackson

== See also ==
- San Juan volcanic field
- Mountains of Mineral County, Colorado
