= Pine Grove, Wisconsin =

Pine Grove, Wisconsin may refer to multiple places:

- Pine Grove, Brown County, Wisconsin, unincorporated community
- Pine Grove, Chippewa County, Wisconsin, unincorporated community
- Pine Grove, Portage County, Wisconsin, town
