= Bristol Hotel, Mar del Plata =

Bristol Hotel
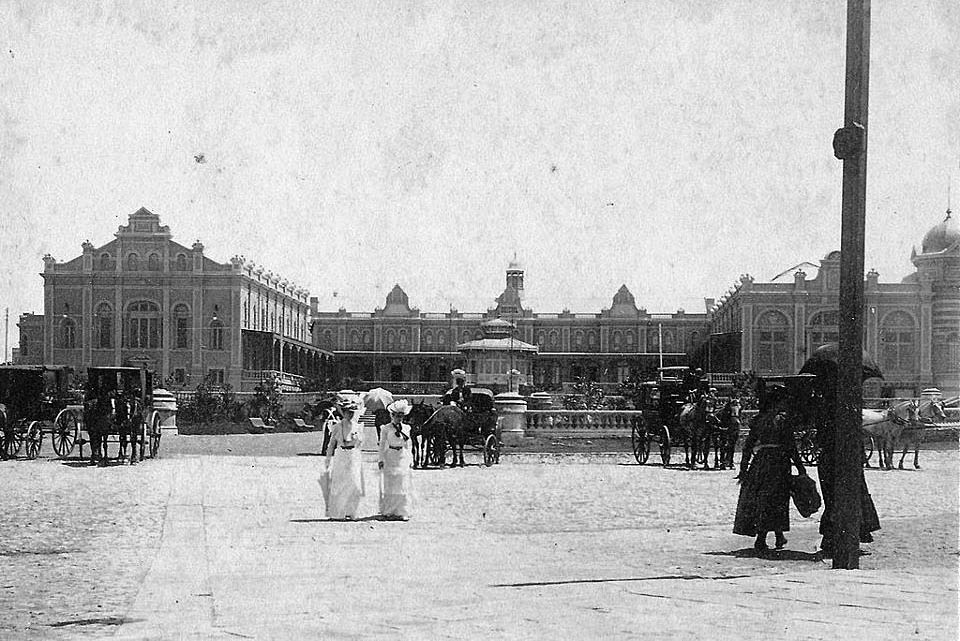
- Dining hall of the Hotel Bristol at the end of the 19th century

- Location within Argentina

General information
- Status: Demolished
- Location: Mar del Plata, Argentina
- Coordinates: 38.001625°S 57.543738°W
- Opened: 8 January 1888
- Closed: 1944
- Demolished: August 1974

Height
- Architectural: Mock Tudor, Italianate

Technical details
- Floor count: 3
- Floor area: 7,500 metres (24,600 ft) (Dining hall)

The Bristol Hotel (often called the Hotel Bristol) was a luxury hotel in Mar del Plata, Argentina. At one time it was patronised by the elite of Buenos Aires. Later it became run down, and in 1944 it was sold, subdivided and rented the premises for commercial use. The hotel building was torn down in 1974. The name survives in the Playa Bristol, the most popular beach in Mar del Plata.

== Background ==
The Basque immigrant Pedro Luro (1820–90) was responsible for development of Mar del Plata, a village founded in 1874. He had made his fortune in ranching, and envisioned developing the village as a port for shipping hides, meat, wool and grain to Buenos Aires. This would avoid the difficult land route through the swampy area of the Salado River. Construction of the dock and supporting buildings began in the summer of 1878–79. By 1881 there were several large warehouses, mills and factories, dominating the economy of Mar del Plata. As well as the wooden dock, by 1883 there was a stone wall on both banks of a 40 metres (130 ft) stretch of the Chacras creek so it could act as a port of shelter.

Luro completed the Grand Hotel by around 1883 in anticipation of the arrival of a railway. It was successively enlarged to 110 rooms. With his health failing, Luro left Mar del Plata in April 1886 and was taken to Paris, where he died in 1890. In the summer of 1886–87 a total of 1,415 passengers arrived by train. That season the Grand Hotel was full of visitors. José Luro, Pedro Luro's third son, and Gastón Sansinena organized the "Sociedad Anónima Bristol Hotel" in April 1887 to build a large casino hotel. Within a few years the Grand Hotel and the Bristol Hotel would displace the industrial activity, which soon disappeared as Mar del Plata became a sea bathing spa.

== Construction ==
The first building of the Bristol Hotel, the casa vieja ("old house") of 1888, was a three-story building 45 by 28 metres (148 by 92 ft) in area with 67 rooms, built in Mock-Tudor style on the block between Entre Ríos, Corrientes, San Martín and Rivadavia. The ground floor was of masonry and the upper floors of wood frame with brick panels. The roof, with several gables, was of slate. It had two square towers with pyramidal roofs. Other mansions with the same design were built along Rivadavia in 1904 and San Martín in 1908. The group of buildings was connected through gardens and paths.

The Dining Hall was built in 1890 in the block bounded by San Martín, Rivadavia, Boulevard Marítimo and Entre Ríos. This is the block where the Bristol Center building stands today. It was a U-shaped building in Italian style, facing the sea. The ceiling of the dining room was considered the most luxurious in Latin America. In addition to the dining room it contained the festival room and the roulette room. It also held the large Pueyrredon Club Lounge. Over the years the building was modified with the addition of corridors, terraces, balconies and basements.

To accommodate the many visitors to the grand hotel an annex was built later in the triangular block between Buenos Aires, Belgrano and Boulevard Marítimo. The annex originally had two floors, and another two were added later. The three blocks were linked by tunnels used by guests and staff. One ran under Calle Entre Ríos and connected the original hotel with the dining hall, and another joined the dining center with the annex.

== Opening ==
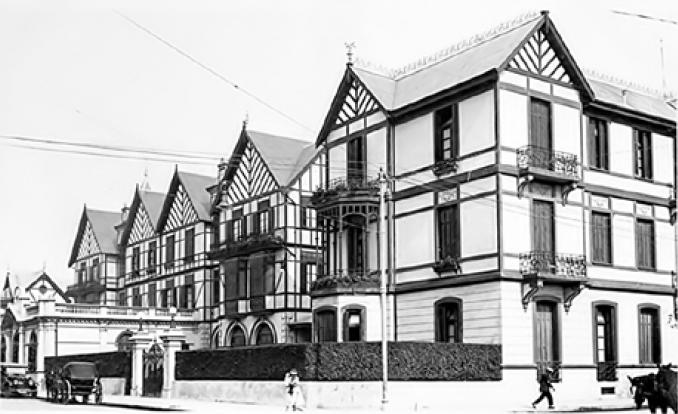
Residential building

The Bristol Hotel opened on 8 January 1888, with invitations to attend the ceremony given to leading members of Buenos Aires society and national leaders. Many of the leading citizens of Buenos Aires came to the opening of the Hotel Bristol by overnight train. According to a contemporary report the guests arrived in what was then the village of Mar del Plata on a rainy and windy day, but all marvelled at the seascape. There was a great soiree at 21:30 in the salon of the Bristol, presumably in the first chalet. Dr. Carlos Pellegrini, vice-president of Argentina, gave the welcoming speech. Other guests at the opening were Dardo Rocha, the Buenos Aires Governor Máximo Paz and Bartolomé Mitre. There is an unconfirmed report, published in 1930, by Caras y Caretas, that lists Nicholás II, then Tsarevich and part of the crew of a Russian school ship, as one of the guests. The first dinner had a menu prepared by 24 chefs hired from Europe. After the dinner the guests were entertained by the children and wives of the distinguished guests.

== History ==
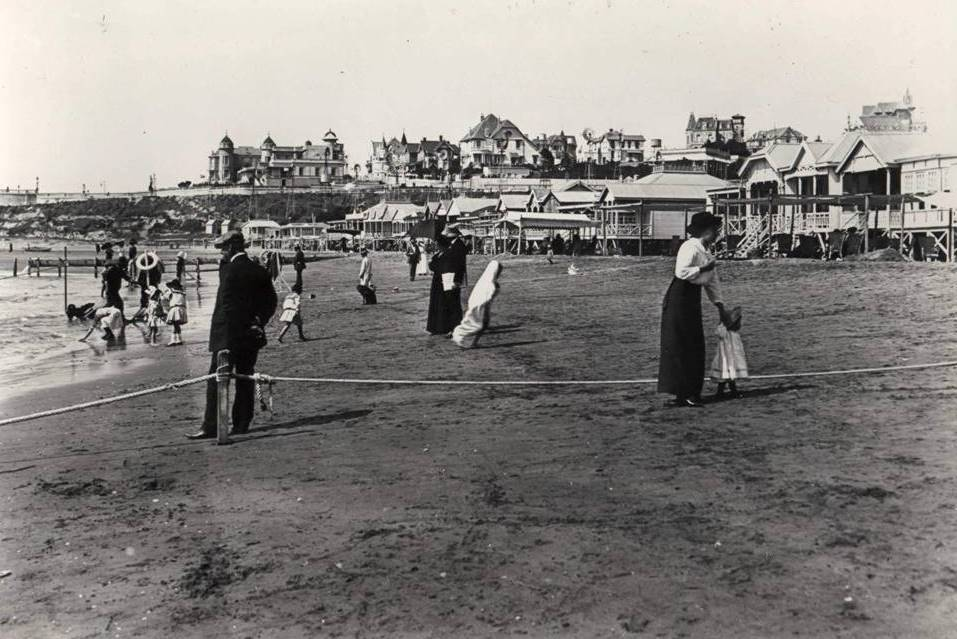
Playa Bristol in 1910

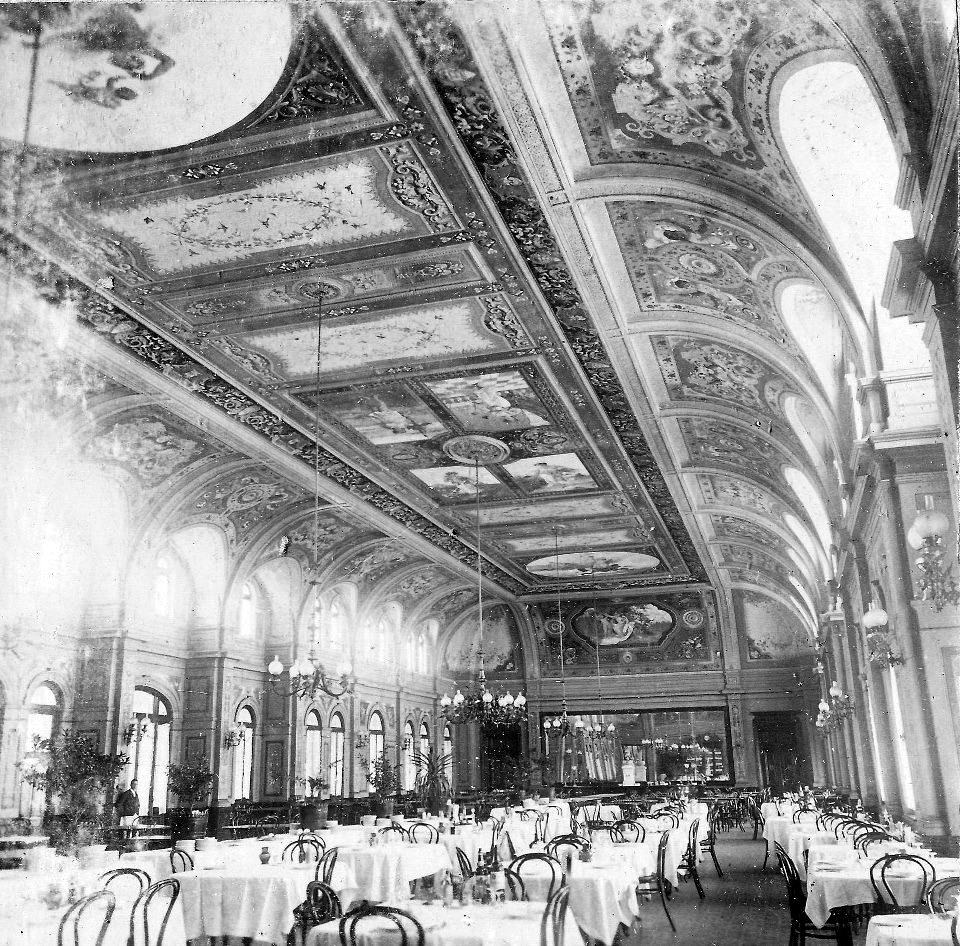
The great dining hall

The Bristol was patronised by wealthy families of Buenos Aires and other parts of the country who would come to bathe in the sea. On the same year that the hotel was opened a large number of wooden casillas, or bathing machines, were erected on Playa Bristol, and began to be joined by a platform covered in awnings. This was the start of the early wooden rambla. The rambla was about 3 metres (9.8 ft) wide, resting directly on the sand. In January 1888 Pelusso, Narduzzo and La Cava began fishing for the hotel in the boat Lucaro. In March 1888 a French company was authorised to build the Rambla Bristol.

On 15 December 1888 the Sociedad Anónima Bristol Hotel was authorised to construct a pier to provide access to the bathing machines. The first wooden ramblas (promenades) were opened, and the first residences began to be built. The Bristol was followed by La Perla Hotel in 1892, to the north, then the Hotel Royal in 1907 and the Saint James and Centenario hotels in 1910 on the Playa de Ingleses. When Mar del Plata was declared a city in 1907 the resort was called the "Biarritz of Argentina". In 1913 the French rambla was opened, with ceramic pavements from Belgium, balustrades and Greco-Roman statues. In the late 1920s wealthy families began to build chalets and mansions near the Hotel Bristol, and spent their days at the beach, named the Playa Bristol.

More affordable hotels began to appear. Statistics from 1935 record six categories, not counting rooming houses. They catered to the new, broader social classes, who wanted a way to enjoy their newly earned leisure. Between 1930 and 1945 there was strong growth in the number of tourists visiting the town, while the duration of their holidays became shorter. Traditional hotels had to compete with vacation apartments and state-run lodgings. Working class tourists could use government grants to stay at holiday camps and union hotels, while the new middle-classes had a chance of acquiring a small property by the sea. The new government that emerged from the 1943 Argentine coup d'état took moves to reduce rents and make eviction much harder, and set up a vacation office. The closing of the Bristol in June 1944 symbolized the end of the belle époque.

== Later uses of the building ==
After the hotel was closed in 1944, all the installations were auctioned. Objects auctioned included furniture, vehicles, porcelain fittings and even towels. It took eight consecutive weeks to dispose of them all. The property was purchased by a company of Capital Federal. The annex was demolished in 1945.

By 1964 the hotel building was being operated by the Galería Gran Central Empire State limited company, which had divided it into units rented for commercial use. The building had 7,500 metres (24,600 ft) of space with 42 store fronts, 38 internal spaces, 24 stands and three cinemas. An auction was held on 22 February 1964 before an audience of 1,000 people, but the floor price of 290 million pesos was too high, and there were no buyers. After a second attempted auction and a foreclosure judgement the property was purchased for 100 million pesos by the Atarasico company.

The Hotel Bristol was demolished in the mid-1970s in several stages as construction of the 30-story Bristol Center advanced. On 3 May 1974 sanitation workers performing an excavation in Calle Buenos Aires rediscovered the tunnel between the annex and the dining hall. It had been built of bricks laid on edge painted lime yellow. The floor had mosaics, apparently Italian. The passage was soon sealed again. The final stage of the demolition began in August 1974 with removal of the dome at San Martín and Entre Ríos.

== Sources ==
- Alba Piotto (15 January 2006), "TIEMPO LIBRE: La Bristol", Clarín.com, archived from the original on 13 October 2016
- Benson, Andrew; O'Brien, Rosalba; Meghji, Shafik (2013-10-01), The Rough Guide to Argentina, Rough Guides, ISBN 978-1-4093-4264-9
- Elisa Pastoriza (2008), "Estado, gremios y hoteles. Mar del Plata y el peronismo" (PDF), Estudios Sociales (in Spanish) (34)
- Díaz, Lourdes (8 May 2022). "Un hotel de lujo, un zar y la ruptura abrupta de un sueño: historia del Bristol Hotel | 0223". www.0223.com.ar (in Spanish).
- "Fotos de Familia: Foto 1837", La Capital de Mar del Plata (in Spanish)
- "Fotos de Familia: Foto 1903", La Capital de Mar del Plata (in Spanish)
- "Fotos de Familia: Foto 1904", La Capital de Mar del Plata (in Spanish)
- "Fotos de Familia: Foto 1960", La Capital de Mar del Plata (in Spanish)
- "Fotos de Familia: Foto 3461", La Capital de Mar del Plata (in Spanish)
- Gerardo Celemín, "PEDRO LURO en Mar del Plata. 1877 – 1886", Conexiones (in Spanish)
- Juarez Celman (1889), Registro nacional de la República Argentina
- "Mar del Plata – Fechas – Años 1887–1888", HISTORIA mar del plata (in Spanish), archived from the original on 2012-07-30
- McCloskey, Erin; Burford, Tim (2006), Argentina: The Bradt Travel Guide, Bradt Travel Guides, ISBN 978-1-84162-138-8
- "Playa Bristol", viajeros.com (in Spanish), archived from the original on 2016-08-25
- Virginia E. (7 June 2008), Bristol Hotel (in Spanish), Alumnos del Taller Patrimonio Cultural de Mar del Plata
