= Bristol Airport (disambiguation) =

Bristol Airport may refer to:

- Bristol Airport, serving the Bristol area, England (IATA: BRS, ICAO: EGGD)
- Bristol Filton Airport, a former small airport in the Filton area of Bristol, England
- Bristol (Whitchurch) Airport, the former airport 3 miles (5 km) south of Bristol, England
- Bristol Aerodrome, in Bristol, New Brunswick, Canada (TC LID: CDA6)
