= Playa Bristol =

Beach in Mar del Plata, Argentina

- Beach
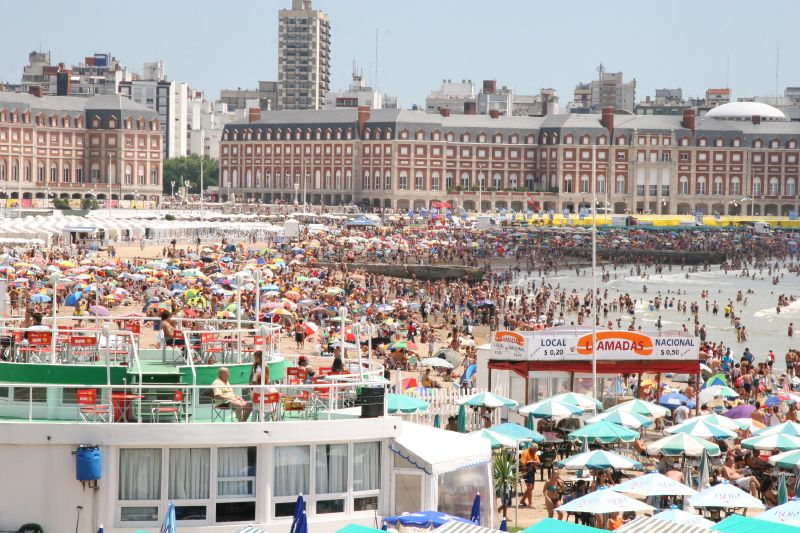
- The beach in January 2006

- Location within Argentina
- Coordinates: 38.006014°S 57.539429°W
- Location: Mar del Plata, Argentina

Dimensions
  - Length: 2 kilometres (1.2 mi)

The Playa Bristol (English: Bristol Beach) is a beach in Mar del Plata, Argentina, named after the Bristol Hotel. At one time it was highly fashionable, drawing the elite of Buenos Aires for vacations.

== Early years (to 1940s) ==
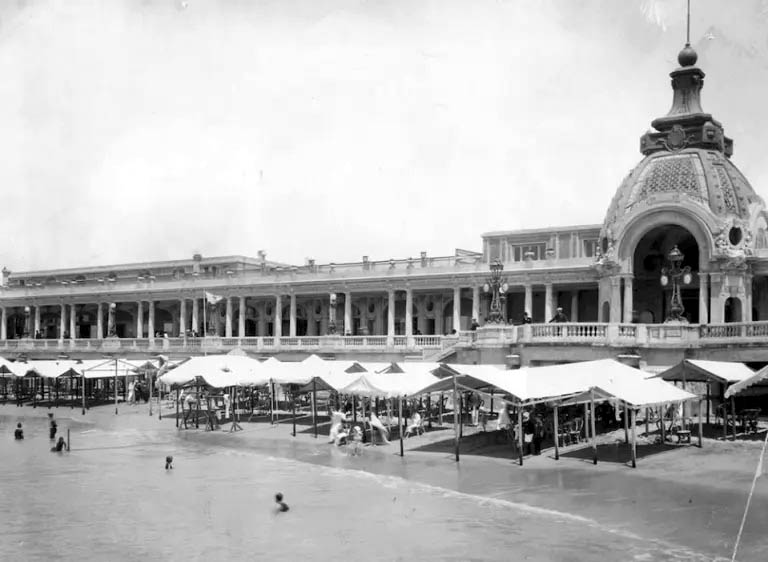
The Playa Bristol in 1920.

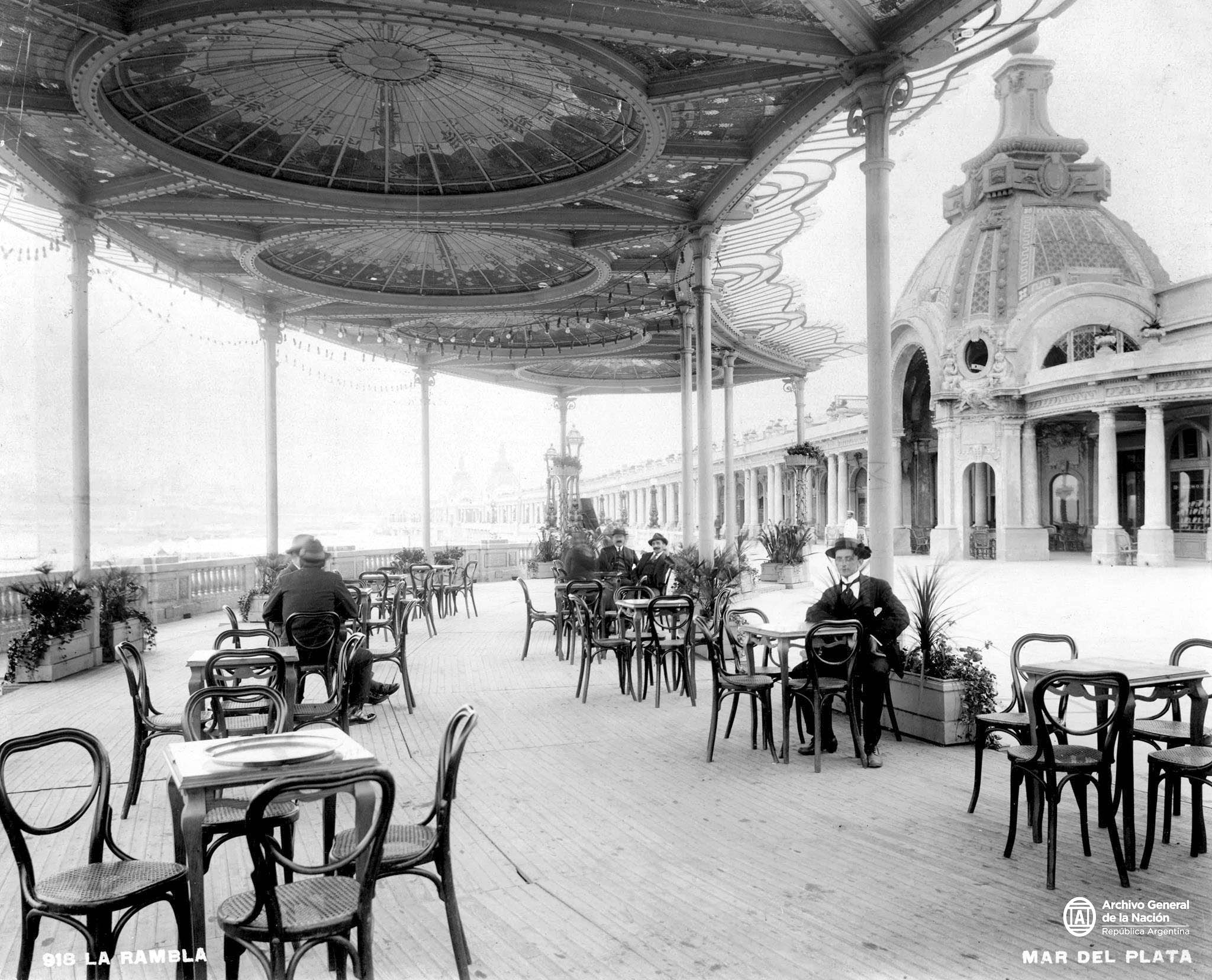
Restaurant on the second promenade of Playa Bristol.

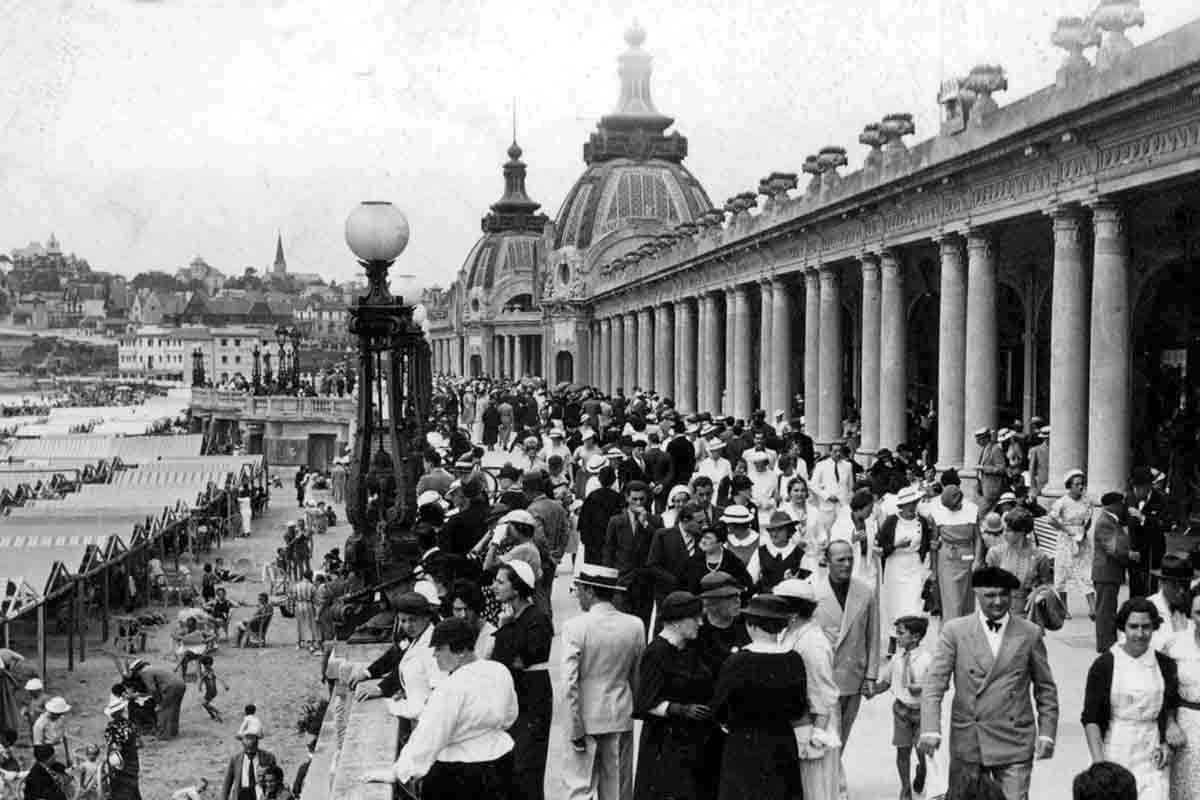
Crowds walking along the Playa Bristol promenade .

In the mid-19th century the beach was the location of a small port. The rancher Patricio Peralta Ramos created the first settlement by the sea. The railway arrived in 1886, bringing the first vacationers. At first the hotels were simple, until the luxurious 3-story Bristol Hotel was built, occupying three blocks. The Bristol opened in 1888, and was patronised by wealthy families of Buenos Aires and other parts of the country who would come to bathe in the sea. Many of the leading citizens of Buenos Aires came to the opening of the Hotel Bristol by overnight train. The first wooden ramblas (promenades) were opened, and the first residences began to be built.

When Mar del Plata was declared a city in 1907 the resort was called the "Biarritz of Argentina". In 1913 the French rambla was opened, with ceramic pavements from Belgium, balustrades and Greco-Roman statues. In the late 1920s wealthy families began to build chalets and mansions near the Hotel Bristol, and spent their days at the beach. They would live in Mar del Plata from November until Easter. The local citizens began to use the beach, calling their section the Playa Popular. Some of the wealthy visitors moved away to the Playa Chica and Playa Grande south of the city.

== Later changes (1940s to 2000) ==
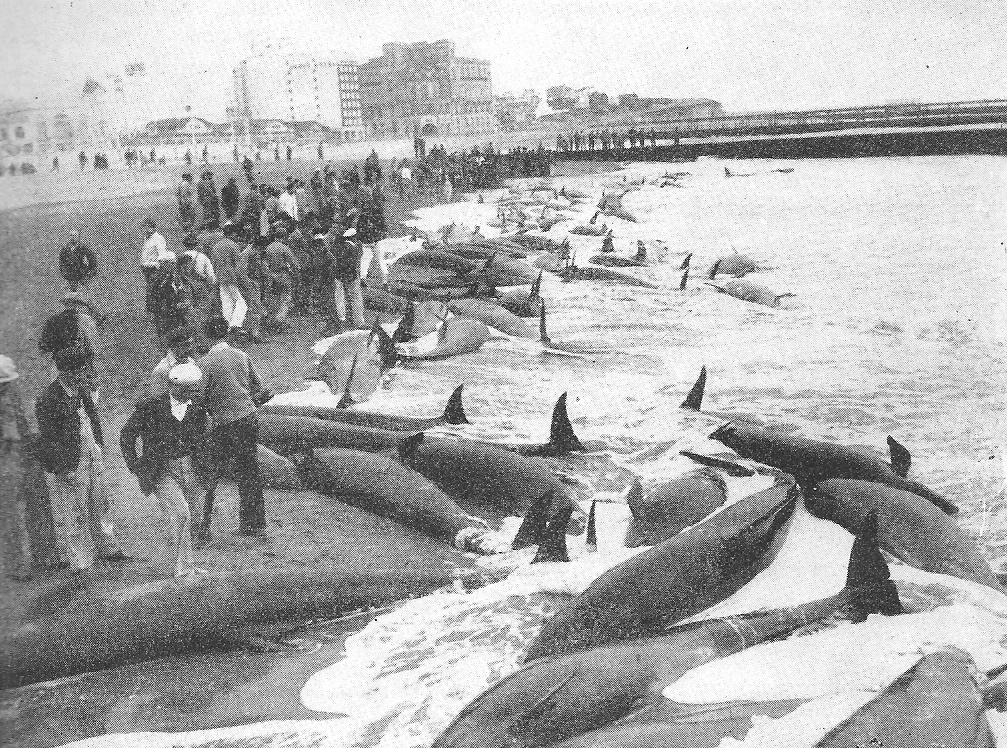
Beached false killer whales on 10 October 1946

More than eight hundred false killer whales beached themselves on the shores of Mar del Plata, mostly on the Playa Bristol, on the afternoon of 10 October 1946. They came in compact groups, and made no efforts to return to the water. Some people stabbed the animals, shot them or cut off their fins. A police guard was placed to stop this cruelty. When the bodies began to decompose they were towed out to sea for 3 kilometres (1.9 mi). The waves returned some bodies to the beach, and two of the skeletons were dissected.

Mar del Plata became a resort for Peronist "social tourism", no longer restricted to the wealthy. The French rambla was demolished in the 1940s. The Bristol Hotel has also been demolished. The casino and the present rambla were already being built. The Gran Hotel Provincial and the Casino Central opened in 1950, the largest hotel in Argentina and the largest casino in the world at the time. They are an impressive complex of buildings along the Rambla Casino, which has a monumental staircase with stone sculptures of sea lions on each side. Small traditional bars opened in the arcades of the Hotel Provincial and the Casino, many of them now gone.

Over time the beach eroded until it became quite narrow. In 1999 new sand was brought in, and it is now almost 100 metres (330 ft) from the promenade to the shore.

== Recent times (from 2000) ==
The beach is the most popular in Mar del Plata, mainly due to its proximity to the commercial centre of the city. Playa Bristol and Plaza Colon, in front of the Casino Central, are the focus of the town for visitors. Both the beach and the water often contain garbage such as plastic bottles or cigarette packages, although six tons of garbage are collected every day. There are two public washrooms. The beach covers 80,000 square metres (860,000 sq ft). In the high season there are 20,000 visitors each day. There is only a gentle surf, but many of the visitors swim. Four lifeguards rescue five people each day, on average. Visitors may rent a beach umbrella, have their picture taken or listen to free street musicians.

== Sources ==
- Alba Piotto (15 January 2006), "TIEMPO LIBRE: La Bristol", Clarín.com, archived from the original on 13 October 2016
- Armando Maronese, "Sucesos Notables", Historia de la Ciudad de Mar del Plata (in Portuguese), Mar del Plata
- Benson, Andrew; O'Brien, Rosalba; Meghji, Shafik (2013-10-01), The Rough Guide to Argentina, Rough Guides, ISBN 978-1-4093-4264-9
- McCloskey, Erin; Burford, Tim (2006), Argentina: The Bradt Travel Guide, Bradt Travel Guides, ISBN 978-1-84162-138-8
- Newton, Paula (2011), Viva Travel Guide Argentina, Viva Publishing Network, ISBN 978-1-937157-04-3
- "Playa Bristol", viajeros.com (in Spanish)
