= Bristol Wells Town Site =

- U.S. National Register of Historic Places
- U.S. Historic district
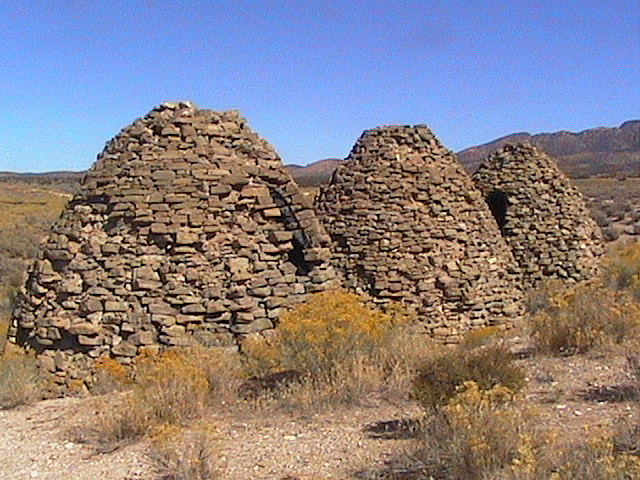
- Old charcoal kilns at the site

- Location within Nevada Location within the United States
- Location: Lincoln County, Nevada
- Nearest city: Pioche, Nevada
- Coordinates: 38°6′9.72″N 114°41′28.98″W
- Built: 1870
- NRHP reference No.: 72000765
- Added to NRHP: March 24, 1972

Bristol Wells, also known as National City, Bristol City and Tempest, is a ghost town in Lincoln County, Nevada. The mining town was located on the west side of Bristol Mountain, 14 miles (23 km) northwest of Pioche, Nevada.

The first mining claims were staked in 1870. The district was organized the next year when the settlement of National City grew around the National Mine. In 1872 a furnace was built to treat silver-lead ore from the Bristol Mine, 4 miles (6.4 km) to the east. In 1878 a richer deposit was found, resulting in the construction of a stamp mill. The settlement was renamed Bristol City the same year. The stamp mill expanded in 1880 and a smelter was built, while stone ovens were built to provide charcoal for the smelter. The town's wells provided water to the mines. By 1890 a new smelter was built to treat copper ore, and the town's population reached 400.

Activity declined after 1893. A leach-recovery plant built in 1900 operated for two years, recovering copper. In 1913 an aerial tramway was built to Jackrabbit, Nevada, 2 miles (3.2 km) to the northeast, where ore could be loaded on the Los Angeles and Salt Lake Railroad. Mining activity continued intermittently, sharply declining after 1918. The town was briefly renamed Tempest after the Tempest Mine in 1922, returning to Bristol in 1929. The post office continued until 1950.

The townsite was listed on the National Register of Historic Places in 1972.

== See also ==
- List of ghost towns in Nevada
