= Bristol, Nova Scotia =

Community in Nova Scotia, Canada

Coordinates: 44°3′3.43″N 64°42′55.11″W

Bristol in Nova Scotia

Bristol is a community in the Canadian province of Nova Scotia, located in the Region of Queens Municipality .
