= Bristol, Ohio =

Unincorporated community in Ohio, US

Coordinates: 39°44′09″N 82°04′41″W

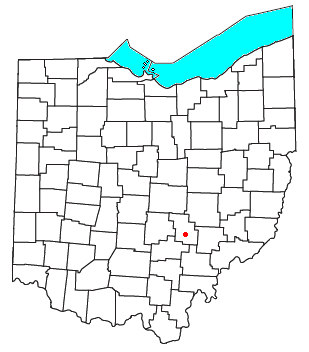
Location of Bristol, Ohio

Bristol is an unincorporated community in southern Pike Township, Perry County, Ohio, United States. It lies along State Route 93 at its intersection with Marietta Road and Township Road 223. It is located 4 miles (6 kilometers) south of New Lexington, the county seat of Perry County.

Bristol was originally called Burlington, and under the latter name was laid out in 1816.
