= Bristol, South Dakota =

- City
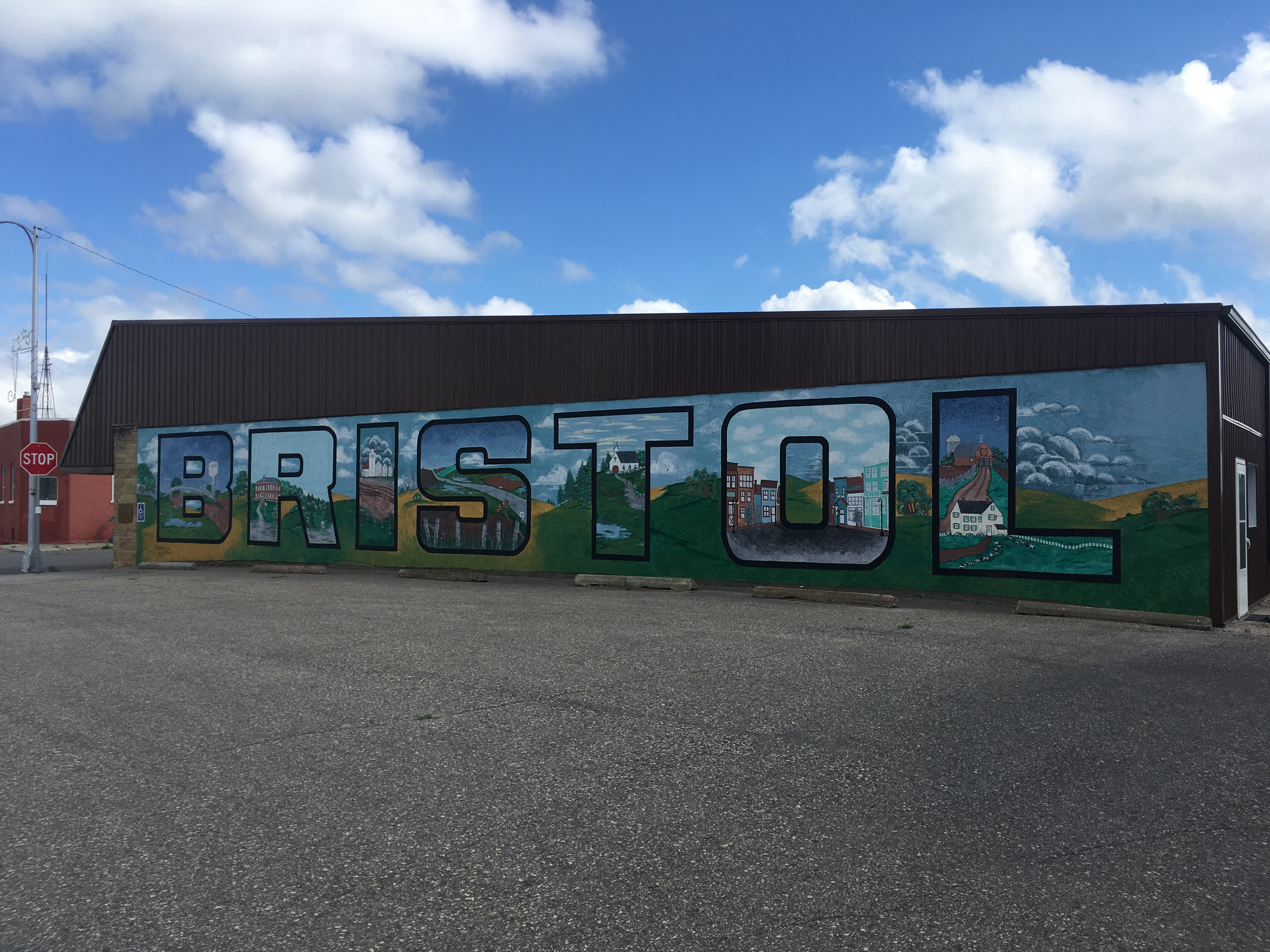

- Location in Day County and the state of South Dakota
- Coordinates: 45°20′48″N 97°44′55″W
- Country: United States
- State: South Dakota
- County: Day
- Incorporated: 1921

Area
  - Total: 0.53 sq mi (1.38 km^{2})
  - Land: 0.52 sq mi (1.35 km^{2})
  - Water: 0.012 sq mi (0.03 km^{2})
- Elevation: 1,788 ft (545 m)

Population (2020)
  - Total: 288
  - Density: 550/sq mi (213/km^{2})
- Time zone: UTC-6 (Central (CST))
  - Summer (DST): UTC-5 (CDT)
- ZIP code: 57219
- Area code: 605
- FIPS code: 46-07300
- GNIS feature ID: 1267296
- Website: http://www.bristolsd.com/

Bristol is a city located in western Day County, South Dakota, United States. It lies in Section 25 of Bristol Township, on the main line of what is now the BNSF Railway alongside U.S. Route 12. The population was 288 at the 2020 census.`

Similar to many towns of the area and of the Midwest in general, Bristol came into being as a result of railroad expansion. The railroad, which first came through the area in the 1870s, identified the site which would become Bristol as Station #70. C.P. Prior, a district railroad surveyor and townsite agent, was given credit for naming Bristol in 1881. He named the town after Bristol, England.

== Geography ==
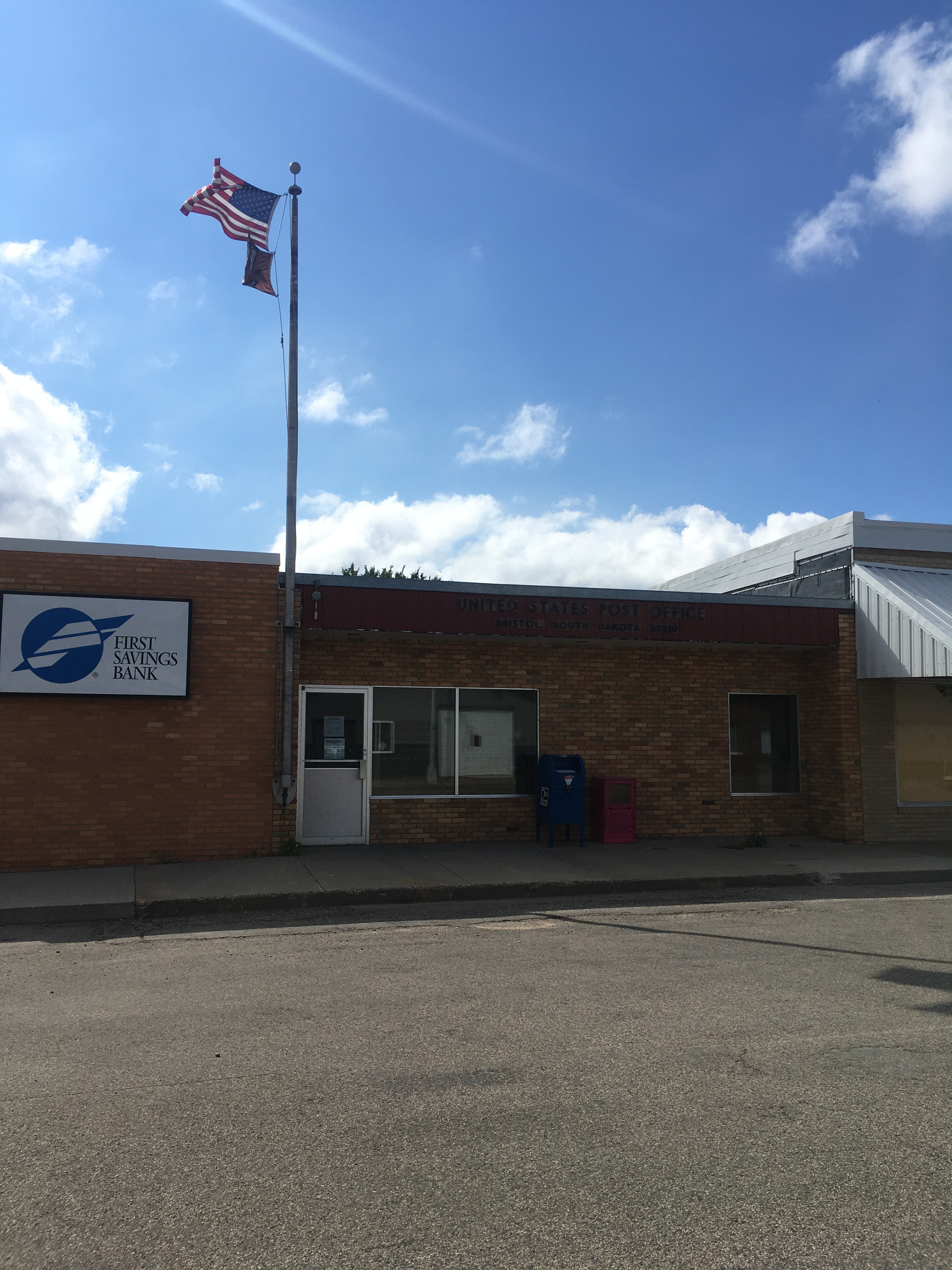
Bristol Post Office

According to the United States Census Bureau, the city has a total area of 0.53 square miles (1.37 km^{2}), of which 0.52 square miles (1.35 km^{2}) is land and 0.01 square miles (0.03 km^{2}) is water.

== Demographics ==
Historical population
Census	Pop.	Note	%±
1890	199		—
1900	282		41.7%
1910	444		57.4%
1920	545		22.7%
1930	666		22.2%
1940	675		1.4%
1950	647		−4.1%
1960	562		−13.1%
1970	470		−16.4%
1980	445		−5.3%
1990	419		−5.8%
2000	377		−10.0%
2010	341		−9.5%
2020	288		−15.5%
U.S. Decennial Census

=== 2020 census ===
As of the 2020 census, Bristol had a population of 288. The median age was 52.0 years. 15.6% of residents were under the age of 18 and 31.3% of residents were 65 years of age or older. For every 100 females there were 100.0 males, and for every 100 females age 18 and over there were 105.9 males age 18 and over.

There were 129 households in Bristol, of which 17.8% had children under the age of 18 living in them. Of all households, 49.6% were married-couple households, 22.5% were households with a male householder and no spouse or partner present, and 22.5% were households with a female householder and no spouse or partner present. About 27.9% of all households were made up of individuals and 20.9% had someone living alone who was 65 years of age or older.

There were 164 housing units, of which 21.3% were vacant. The homeowner vacancy rate was 3.8% and the rental vacancy rate was 13.5%.

0.0% of residents lived in urban areas, while 100.0% lived in rural areas.

Racial composition as of the 2020 census
Race	Number	Percent
White	275	95.5%
Black or African American	0	0.0%
American Indian and Alaska Native	0	0.0%
Asian	2	0.7%
Native Hawaiian and Other Pacific Islander	0	0.0%
Some other race	0	0.0%
Two or more races	11	3.8%
Hispanic or Latino (of any race)	10	3.5%

=== 2010 census ===
As of the census of 2010, there were 341 people, 150 households, and 78 families residing in the city. The population density was 655.8 inhabitants per square mile (253.2/km^{2}). There were 176 housing units at an average density of 338.5 per square mile (130.7/km^{2}). The racial makeup of the city was 98.2% White, 0.3% from other races, and 1.5% from two or more races. Hispanic or Latino of any race were 1.5% of the population.

There were 150 households, of which 18.7% had children under the age of 18 living with them, 44.7% were married couples living together, 3.3% had a female householder with no husband present, 4.0% had a male householder with no wife present, and 48.0% were non-families. 42.7% of all households were made up of individuals, and 21.3% had someone living alone who was 65 years of age or older. The average household size was 1.95 and the average family size was 2.65.

The median age in the city was 52.3 years. 15.2% of residents were under the age of 18; 5.9% were between the ages of 18 and 24; 18.8% were from 25 to 44; 23.8% were from 45 to 64; and 36.4% were 65 years of age or older. The gender makeup of the city was 48.1% male and 51.9% female.

=== 2000 census ===
As of the census of 2000, there were 377 people, 165 households, and 88 families residing in the city. The population density was 718.0 inhabitants per square mile (277.2/km^{2}). There were 186 housing units at an average density of 354.2 per square mile (136.8/km^{2}). The racial makeup of the city was 100.00% White.

There were 165 households, out of which 18.8% had children under the age of 18 living with them, 47.3% were married couples living together, 4.8% had a female householder with no husband present, and 46.1% were non-families. 40.6% of all households were made up of individuals, and 27.3% had someone living alone who was 65 years of age or older. The average household size was 2.01 and the average family size was 2.71.

In the city, the population was spread out, with 18.0% under the age of 18, 6.6% from 18 to 24, 18.0% from 25 to 44, 17.5% from 45 to 64, and 39.8% who were 65 years of age or older. The median age was 54 years. For every 100 females, there were 83.0 males. For every 100 females age 18 and over, there were 82.8 males.

The median income for a household in the city was $32,031, and the median income for a family was $39,375. Males had a median income of $30,208 versus $17,500 for females. The per capita income for the city was $19,006. About 8.7% of families and 6.4% of the population were below the poverty line, including 7.9% of those under age 18 and 7.8% of those age 65 or over.

== Notable person ==
- Tom Brokaw, longtime NBC Nightly News anchor

== Gallery ==
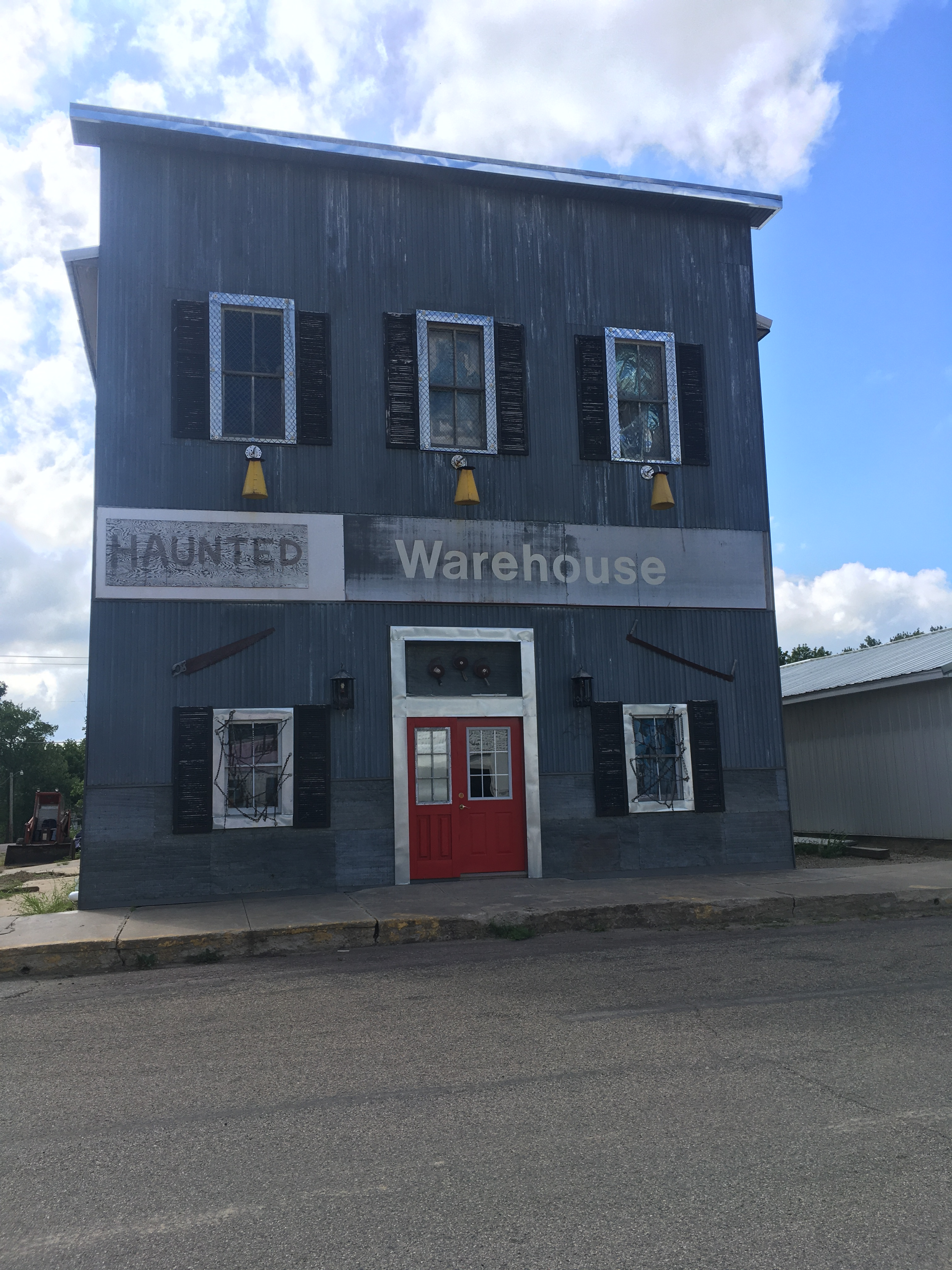
Bristol Haunted Warehouse

== See also ==
- List of cities in South Dakota
