= Tornado outbreak of October 20–22, 2019 =

Weather event in the United States

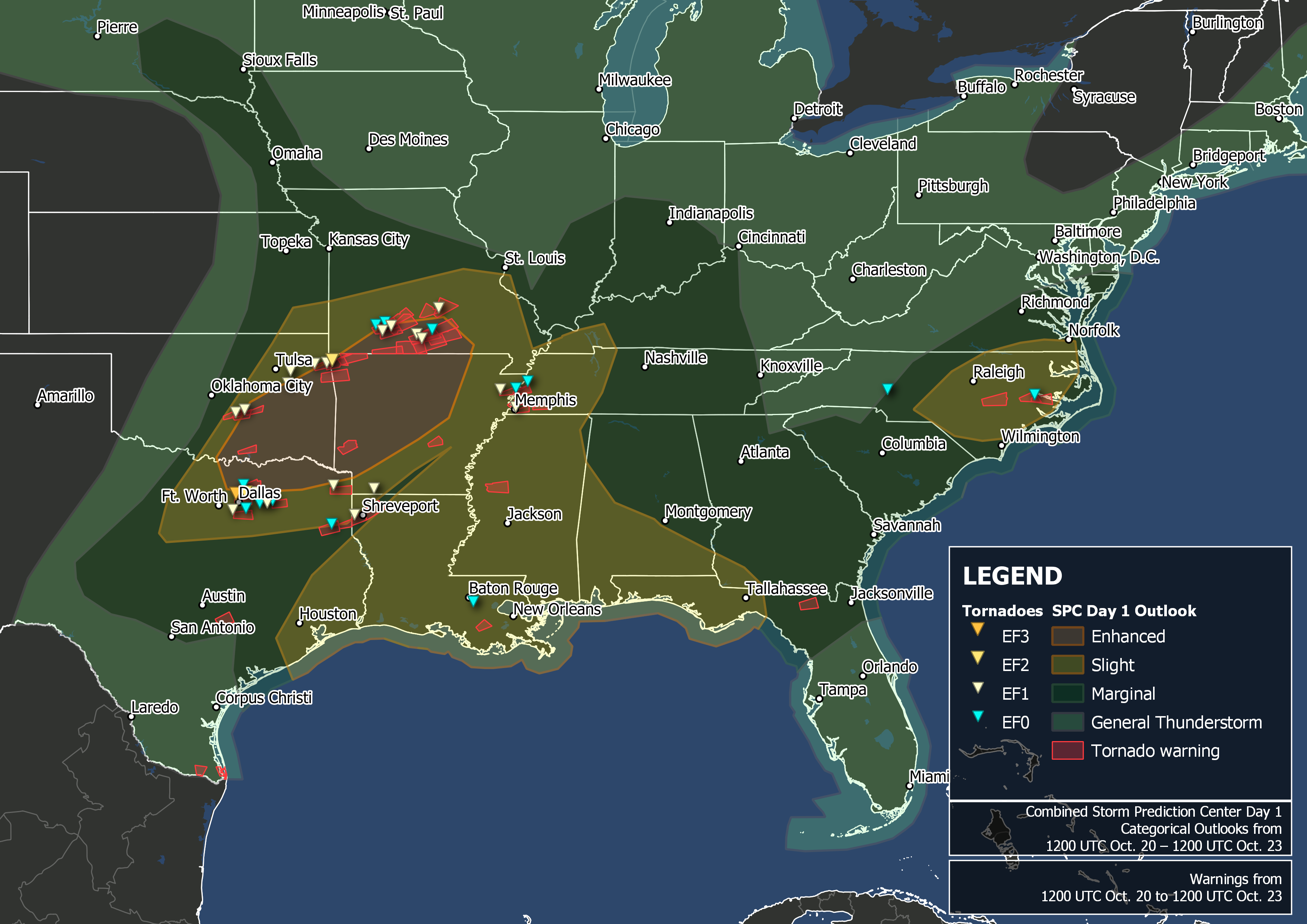
- Map of tornado warnings and confirmed tornadoes from the outbreak

Meteorological history
- Formed: October 20, 2019
- Dissipated: October 22, 2019

Tornado outbreak
- Tornadoes: 36
- Max. rating: EF3 tornado
- Duration: 24 hours
- Highest winds: Tornadic: 140 mph (230 km/h) (Dallas, TX EF3 tornado); Non-tornadic: 82 mph (132 km/h) (SSW of Hoffman, Oklahoma)
- Largest hail: 2.75 in (70 mm) (Milburn and Prague, Oklahoma)

Overall effects
- Injuries: 7
- Damage: $2 billion (2019 USD)
- Areas affected: South Central United States, Southeastern United States
- Part of the tornado outbreaks of 2019

A significant tornado outbreak impacted the South Central United States between October 20–22, 2019. Forecasters first identified the threat on October 16 as a large upper-level trough was expected to combine with an unstable atmosphere across Texas, Oklahoma, and Arkansas particularly. On the evening of October 20, discrete supercell thunderstorms developed across the Dallas–Fort Worth metroplex, contributing to several tornadoes. One of those tornadoes caused EF3 damage in the Dallas suburbs, becoming the costliest tornado event in Texas for 2019, at $1.55 billion. A later squall line contributed to additional tornadoes and a widespread swath of damaging winds as the system tracked eastward.

== Meteorological synopsis ==
The first signs of organized severe weather across the South Central United States came on October 16, when the Storm Prediction Center (SPC) first delineated a risk area across portions of northern Texas, eastern Oklahoma, and adjacent portions of Kansas, Missouri, and Arkansas. In their day 3 outlook on October 18, the organization introduced a broad Marginal risk for much of the same areas. A small Slight risk was added across northeastern Texas, southeastern Oklahoma, and western Arkansas on October 19, but as confidence in a higher-end event increased, these same areas were raised to an Enhanced risk. In advance of the outbreak, the SPC monitored several weather features of interest. In the upper levels of the atmosphere, an upper-level trough was expected to amplify as it progressed eastward into the U.S. Plains, providing increasing wind shear throughout the region. Simultaneously, a low-pressure area and associated cold front were anticipated to shift eastward across an unstable environment, leading to the formation of severe thunderstorms. Forecasters noted that while the overall environment supported the potential for significant (EF2+) tornadoes, questions about whether storms would be supercellular or instead evolve into a quasi-linear convective system prevented the addition a significant risk area. By the late afternoon hours of October 20, thunderstorms began to develop across eastern Oklahoma within a rapidly moistening environment. At 7:58 p.m. CDT, the first tornado watch was issued across the Ark-La-Tex region; several more watches were introduced over subsequent hours. A pair of long-tracked supercells developed across Tarrant and Johnson counties, intersecting a very unstable regime and producing significant tornadoes as a result. A squall line formed along the cold front farther west, producing a wide swath of damaging winds and additional tornadoes as it tracked across the South-Central United States.

== Confirmed tornadoes ==
Confirmed tornadoes by Enhanced Fujita rating
EFU	EF0	EF1	EF2	EF3	EF4	EF5	Total
0	13	20	2	1	0	0	36

=== October 20 event ===
List of confirmed tornadoes – Sunday, October 20, 2019 (Note: All dates are based on the local time zone where the tornado touched down; however, all times are in Coordinated Universal Time for consistency.)
EF#	Location	County / Parish	State	Start Coord.	Time (UTC)	Path length	Max width
EF0	SW of Beckville	Panola	TX	32.1470°N 94.5443°W	00:36–00:38	0.8 mi (1.3 km)	150 yd (140 m)
EF0	Several trees were snapped or uprooted. A home's roof was damaged.						
EF1	SSE of Greenwood	Caddo	LA	32.3738°N 93.976°W	01:42–01:49	3.59 mi (5.78 km)	350 yd (320 m)
EF1	A greenhouse was destroyed, shingled were ripped off the roofs of two homes, and an RV trailer was rolled onto its side. Numerous trees were snapped or uprooted.						
EF3	Northern Dallas to Richardson	Dallas	TX	32.8685°N 96.9149°W	01:58–02:30	15.76 mi (25.36 km)	1,300 yd (1,200 m)
EF3	See article on this tornado						
EF1	N of Midlothian	Ellis	TX	32.4981°N 96.9935°W	02:10–02:15	2.83 mi (4.55 km)	350 yd (320 m)
EF1	Several church and retail buildings had their roofs damaged and windows blown out. One structure attached to the church was severely damaged as most of its roof was ripped off, and its south-facing wall collapsed. Two buildings had sheet metal peeled away, while one of the structures had its metal roof purlins bent. Several homes suffered significant roof damage and had windows blown out, one of which had its garage door collapse. Trees were snapped or uprooted as well.						
EF2	Garland	Dallas	TX	32.8974°N 96.6753°W	02:24–02:30	2.48 mi (3.99 km)	265 yd (242 m)
EF2	This high-end EF2 tornado caused significant damage in Garland. A wide section of the roof of a Sears facility warehouse was peeled off, tearing away the adjacent metal walls and causing some of the interior support columns and beams to bend. An empty 18-wheeler and a van were tipped onto their sides. Nearby, a newly built warehouse collapsed as its support columns were bent to the ground. Debris from this structure caused additional damage to nearby homes. Along the remainder of the tornado path, numerous homes were heavily damaged, some of which had their roofs torn off. Many trees were snapped or uprooted as well. Damage totaled $400 million.						
EF1	Rowlett to Wylie	Dallas	TX	32.9237°N 96.5697°W	02:36–02:45	6.02 mi (9.69 km)	500 yd (460 m)
EF1	This high-end EF1 tornado moved through residential areas, damaging numerous homes. Some homes had large portions of their roofs torn off. Several outbuildings were also damaged or destroyed, and trees were downed.						
EF0	W of Ferris	Ellis	TX	32.5332°N 96.6664°W	02:42–02:44	0.18 mi (0.29 km)	170 yd (160 m)
EF0	A silo was damaged and partially collapsed, multiple businesses sustained roof damage, a power pole was downed, and trees were snapped or uprooted.						
EF1	Rockwall	Rockwall	TX	32.9312°N 96.4864°W	02:48–02:54	1.96 mi (3.15 km)	100 yd (91 m)
EF1	Several homes suffered significant roof damage. Trees and fences were downed.						
EF1	S of Asher	Pontotoc	OK	34.91°N 96.92°W	03:01–03:02	0.25 mi (0.40 km)	150 yd (140 m)
EF1	A barn was destroyed, and a few other farm buildings were damaged.						
EF1	ENE of Konawa	Seminole	OK	34.98°N 96.70°W	03:12–03:15	2.8 mi (4.5 km)	100 yd (91 m)
EF1	Several wooden power poles were snapped, and trees were damaged.						
EF0	N of Kaufman	Kaufman	TX	32.6661°N 96.3241°W	03:27–03:28	0.13 mi (0.21 km)	50 yd (46 m)
EF0	A home lost a portion of its metal roofing. A nearby power pole was partially snapped.						
EF1	SE of Elmo	Kaufman	TX	32.6708°N 96.1393°W	03:39–03:41	0.53 mi (0.85 km)	500 yd (460 m)
EF1	Sheet metal was ripped from an outbuilding, two power poles were snapped, and a metal barn was severely damaged, with its metal roof almost completely ripped off and its steel trusses severely bent. Several large trees were snapped or damaged. A personal weather station measured a wind gust of 100 miles per hour (160 km/h).						
EF0	N of Wills Point	Van Zandt	TX	32.7353°N 96.0054°W	03:59–04:04	0.63 mi (1.01 km)	200 yd (180 m)
EF0	Multiple roofs sustained damaged. Multiple sheds and carports were overturned and damaged. A few small trees were uprooted and tree branches were broken.						
EF1	E of Coweta	Wagoner	OK	35.9436°N 95.5608°W	04:08–04:15	7.2 mi (11.6 km)	1,100 yd (1,000 m)
EF1	A home was damaged, and trees and power poles were toppled.						
EF1	N of Wainwright	Muskogee	OK	35.6351°N 95.6311°W	04:12–04:22	8.3 mi (13.4 km)	400 yd (370 m)
EF1	A couple of trees were snapped or uprooted and a power pole was blown down.						
EF1	NW of Scraper	Cherokee	OK	36.1189°N 94.9665°W	04:39–04:43	2.9 mi (4.7 km)	600 yd (550 m)
EF1	Numerous trees were snapped or uprooted.						

=== October 21 event ===
List of confirmed tornadoes – Monday, October 21, 2019
EF#	Location	County / Parish	State	Start Coord.	Time (UTC)	Path length	Max width
EF1	NW of Watts to SE of Siloam Springs	Adair (OK), Benton (AR)	OK, AR	36.1410°N 94.6644°W	05:00–05:09	9.1 mi (14.6 km)	900 yd (820 m)
EF1	Outbuildings were destroyed, homes were damaged, power poles were snapped, and numerous trees were uprooted.						
EF2	Southeastern Siloam Springs to Rogers	Benton	AR	36.1778°N 94.5310°W	05:08–05:38	31.4 mi (50.5 km)	2,640 yd (2,410 m)
EF2	This extremely large, long-tracked, wedge tornado touched down on the southeastern side of Siloam Springs as the previous tornado was dissipating just to its south. It initially moved east-northeastward at EF1 intensity in the vicinity of AR 264, AR 16, AR 16S and US 412/AR 59, inflicting roof damage to outbuildings and damaging or uprooting trees. Hangars at Smith Field were damaged; the roof was blown off a business, and several other businesses were damaged. On the east side of the city, numerous homes suffered roof damage. The tornado continued to the northeast of town, crested a hill, and reached its peak intensity of EF2 shortly thereafter. Well-built outbuildings were destroyed, a house had its roof torn off, and other homes were damaged and had windows blown out. The tornado then continued at EF1 strength, damaging a metal building system and snapping or uprooting trees. More trees and metal building systems were damaged as the tornado continued east-northeastward. The tornado then moved near Highfill, Northwest Arkansas National Airport, and Cave Springs, uprooting more trees as it crossed AR 264 and AR 112. The tornado then entered the southern part of Rogers, uprooting trees and damaging an Embassy Suites. It then crossed I-49/US 71 and moved through the southern and eastern part of the downtown area, crossing US 71B/AR 94 and AR 265. Numerous homes and businesses were damaged, and trees were uprooted. The tornado then caused decreasing levels of tree damage before dissipating over Beaver Lake shortly after crossing AR 12.						
EF0	Northwestern Allen	Collin	TX	33.1169°N 96.7272°W	05:22–05:27	4.8 mi (7.7 km)	500 yd (460 m)
EF0	Shingles were ripped off a number of residences, and a number of other homes sustained roof and facade damage. Wood fencing and a stone wall was blown down, and large trees were snapped.						
EF0	SSE of Battlefield	Christian, Greene	MO	37.0814°N 93.4471°W	05:57–06:04	4.72 mi (7.60 km)	100 yd (91 m)
EF0	Numerous trees were snapped, four metal power poles and power lines were downed, and a home sustained damage to its roof, gutters, and vinyl siding.						
EF1	Highlandville	Christian	MO	36.9383°N 93.2845°W	06:03–06:16	11.88 mi (19.12 km)	150 yd (140 m)
EF1	This tornado uprooted or snapped dozens of trees.						
EF0	Southeastern Springfield	Greene	MO	37.1486°N 93.2225°W	06:11–06:15	1.41 mi (2.27 km)	20 yd (18 m)
EF0	Large tree limbs were snapped, a few street signs were bent, and an aluminum fence was damaged. A home suffered minor roof damage too.						
EF1	Southeast of Rogersville	Christian, Webster	MO	37.0573°N 93.0693°W	06:18–06:28	6.29 mi (10.12 km)	250 yd (230 m)
EF1	Along the path numerous trees were uprooted or broken along with numerous outbuildings damaged or destroyed.						
EF1	W of Gentryville	Douglas	MO	36.853°N 92.4388°W	07:06–07:21	16.32 mi (26.26 km)	450 yd (410 m)
EF1	Hundreds or thousands of trees were snapped or destroyed. One outbuilding was destroyed and several others were damaged.						
EF1	NW of Sycamore to NE of Dora	Ozark, Douglas	MO	36.7464°N 92.3107°W	07:13–07:25	12.94 mi (20.82 km)	450 yd (410 m)
EF1	Numerous outbuildings and trees were heavily damaged. Two mobile homes were also damaged, including one that lost its roof and was pulled off its foundation.						
EF0	WSW of Willow Springs	Howell	MO	36.9715°N 92.0525°W	07:30–07:31	0.11 mi (0.18 km)	50 yd (46 m)
EF0	Several trees were snapped or uprooted.						
EF1	WNW of Licking	Texas	MO	37.5017°N 91.8896°W	07:46–07:50	1.11 mi (1.79 km)	450 yd (410 m)
EF1	Dozens of trees were snapped or uprooted. Several homes and outbuildings sustained minor damage. A mobile home was overturned.						
EF1	SSW of Douglassville	Cass	TX	33.1039°N 94.4987°W	08:08–08:21	9.09 mi (14.63 km)	150 yd (140 m)
EF1	The roof was torn off a very small shed, and some tin roofing material from an unknown location was wrapped around some trees. Otherwise, the remainder of the damage was to trees.						
EF1	S of Taylor	Lafayette, Columbia	AR	33.0262°N 93.495°W	09:21–09:28	5.34 mi (8.59 km)	300 yd (270 m)
EF1	The roof and siding was partially removed from an outbuilding. The roofs of two homes were partially removed. A few trees were snapped.						
EF1	Tyronza	Poinsett	AR	35.4827°N 90.3644°W	10:50–10:53	1.11 mi (1.79 km)	125 yd (114 m)
EF1	Several outbuildings were destroyed, a convenience store and an elementary school were damaged, and numerous trees were toppled. Three people were injured.						
EF0	NW of Munford	Tipton (TN), Mississippi (AR)	TN, AR	35.5095°N 89.9776°W	11:20–11:31	7.6 mi (12.2 km)	200 yd (180 m)
EF0	Several outbuildings were destroyed, a convenience store and an elementary school were damaged, and numerous trees were toppled. Three people were injured.						
EF1	Memphis	Shelby	TN	35.0452°N 89.9839°W	11:34–11:43	7.42 mi (11.94 km)	250 yd (230 m)
EF1	Significant roof damage was inflicted to an apartment complex. Numerous trees and business signs were downed.						
EF0	SW of Ripley	Lauderdale	TN	35.6811°N 89.6854°W	11:44–11:52	7.31 mi (11.76 km)	200 yd (180 m)
EF0	Trees were snapped or uprooted. One home sustained minor roof damage.						
EF0	Geismar	Ascension	LA	30.2194°N 91.0336°W	18:00–18:01	0.06 mi (0.097 km)	15 yd (14 m)
EF0	Roofing material was blown off a small warehouse building and tossed 50 yd (46 m). The flying debris also inflicted further damage to a larger warehouse building that also saw some its sheet metal ripped from its outside walls. One person was injured by flying debris.						

=== October 22 event ===
List of confirmed tornadoes – Tuesday, October 22, 2019
EF#	Location	County / Parish	State	Start Coord.	Time (UTC)	Path length	Max width
EF0	E of Cornelius	Cabarrus	NC	35.481°N 80.77°W	16:57–16:59	0.26 mi (0.42 km)	50 yd (46 m)
EF0	Multiple trees were snapped or uprooted. Some beehives were overturned.						
EF0	NE of Vanceboro	Craven	NC	35.3508°N 77.1258°W	23:43–23:44	0.04 mi (0.064 km)	40 yd (37 m)
EF0	Several trees were snapped or uprooted. A home suffered very minor roof damage and porch furniture was blown around.						

=== North Dallas–Richardson, Texas ===
North Dallas–Richardson, Texas
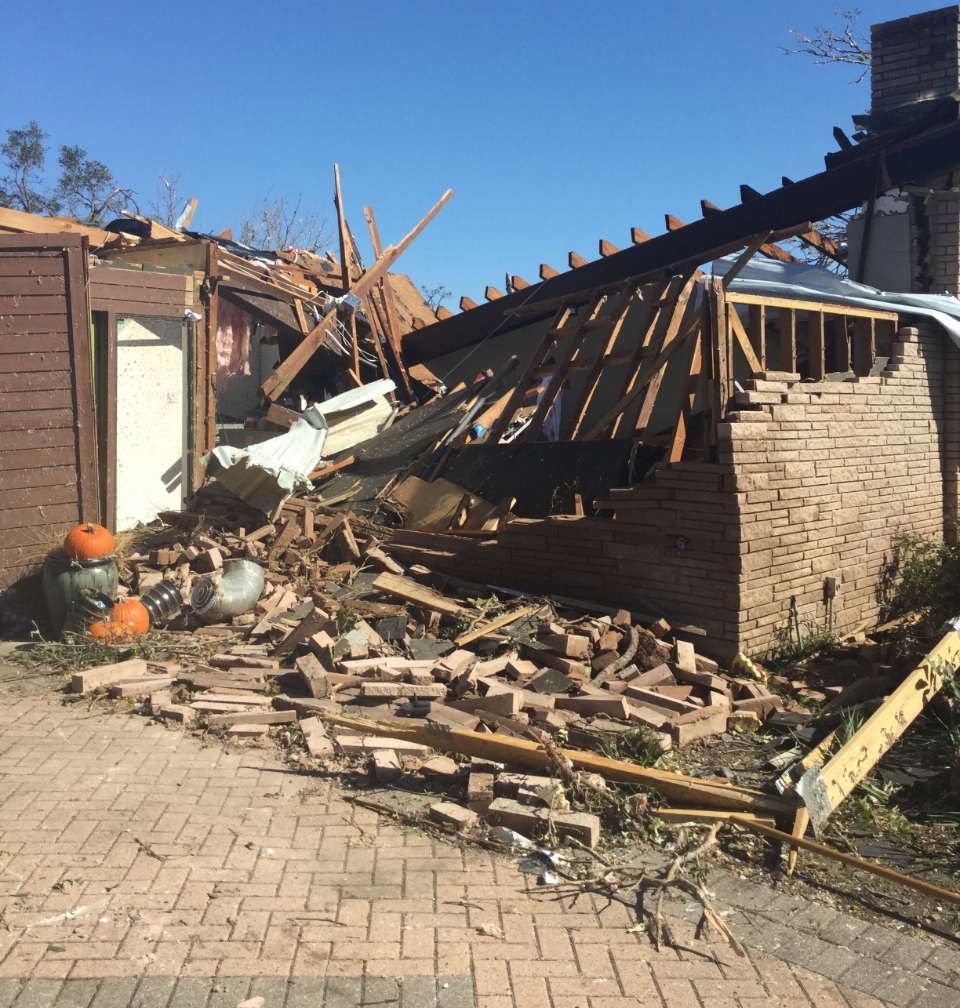
- EF3 damage to a home from the tornado

Meteorological history
- Formed: October 20, 2019, 8:58 p.m. CDT
- Dissipated: October 20, 2019, 9:30 p.m. CDT
- Duration: 32 minutes

EF3 tornado
- on the Enhanced Fujita scale
- Max width: 1,300 yards (0.74 mi; 1.2 km)
- Path length: 15.76 miles (25.36 km)
- Highest winds: 140 mph (230 km/h)

Overall effects
- Fatalities: 0
- Injuries: 1
- Damage: $1.55 billion (2019 USD) (6th costliest tornado in US history)
- Areas affected: North Dallas, Texas, Richardson, Texas

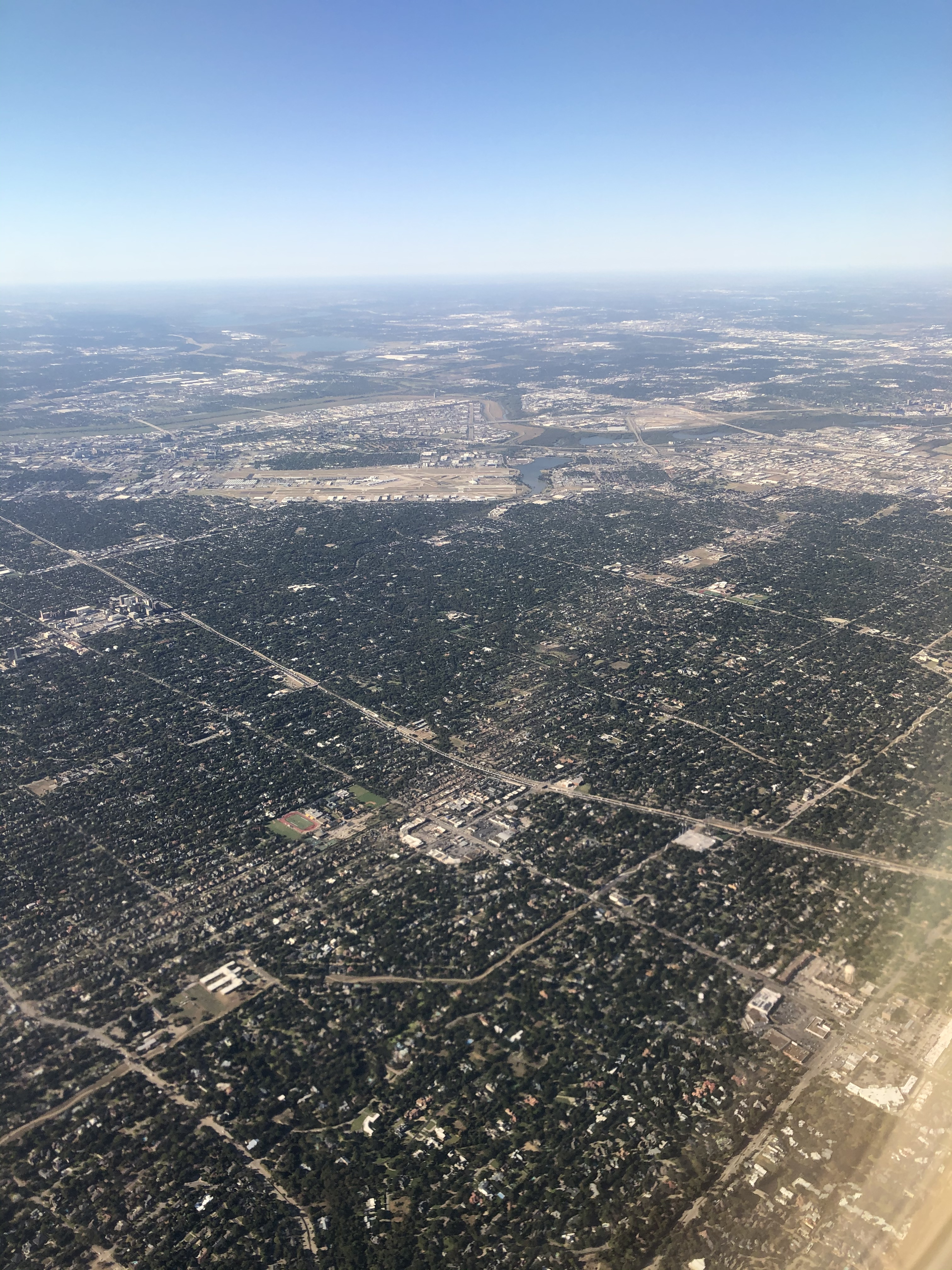
The path of tornado damage across North Dallas from the air the following morning. Looking south-west, the Dallas North Tollway is visible across the middle, and Dallas Love Field Airport is in the distance. The tornado travelled from top-right to bottom-left in this photo.

This large and intense tornado began in Dallas County, Texas, near the interaction of Spur 348 and Luna Road, snapping large tree limbs. The tornado moved east-northeast across I-35E quickly reaching high-end EF2 strength. A strip mall was severely damaged, sustaining roof loss and collapse of multiple exterior walls. Several other retail businesses were also damaged in this area. Along Walnut Hill Lane, a multi-story apartment complex and a commercial building had their roofs ripped off, and also sustained loss of some exterior walls. Numerous homes, along with churches and a gas station also sustained heavy damage in this area. Maintaining EF2 strength, the tornado moved across Marsh Lane and through areas east, heavily damaging Cary Middle School and Thomas Jefferson High School. The tornado produced a mixture of EF1 and EF2 damage as it moved through residential neighborhoods to the northeast of this area, downing numerous trees, and causing moderate to significant damage to many houses. Dozens of homes along this portion of the path had their roofs torn off, several of which sustained some failure of exterior walls. The most intense pocket of damage occurred along Northaven Road, where one well-built brick home had its roof torn off, and sustained collapse of most exterior walls. Given the degree of damage, damage surveyors assigned low-end EF3 damage to that home; this was the only EF3 damage point assigned along the path of the tornado.

The tornado then shifted to a more northerly course as it crossed US 75 between Forest Lane and Royal Lane, where several businesses, including a car dealership, a Home Depot, and office low-rise buildings, suffered EF2 damage. It crossed the Texas Instruments campus, still on a northeasterly course, causing mainly EF1 damage. The tornado then crossed I-635 at the Greenville Avenue/TI Boulevard exit, still heading northeast. At the corner of Greenville Ave. and Walnut St, the nearby apartment complex suffered roof damage, and the trees at the Restland Cemetery suffered serious damage. The nearby Cutters Point apartment complex was also affected, with significant roof loss consistent with EF2 damage. A low-rise office building at the northeast corner of Walnut St and Abrams Rd. had numerous windows blown out and other damage, and has subsequently been demolished. Many homes in Richardson north of Richland College also suffered EF2 damage before the tornado began to weaken. Widespread tree and roof damage consistent with an EF1 tornado was observed across the Richland Park, Lakes of Buckingham, Richland Meadows, and College Park subdivisions. A few homes had their roofs blown off at high-end EF1 intensity. The weakening tornado then curved sharply to the north, continuing into the Huffhines Park area. Damage along this portion of the path consisted of minor damage to homes, along with numerous trees and tree limbs downed.

Weakening further to EF0 strength, the tornado decreased in width and finally dissipated while crossing Jupiter Road. In total, the tornado was on the ground for 15.76 mi (25.36 km), reached a maximum width of 1,300 yd (1,200 m), and remained on the ground for 32 minutes. Three minor injuries were also reported. Additionally, the tornado caused about $1.55 billion in damage, making it the second costliest tornado event in Texas history, just behind the Lubbock tornado in 1970 which caused about $2.03 billion in 2025 USD.

== Impact ==
Around 8:00 a.m. the next morning, approximately 242,000 people were without power. Six schools in the Dallas ISD cancelled classes on October 21, including Thomas Jefferson High School. Many roads into Dallas were closed due to fallen trees and power lines. The EF3 tornado passed near the home of former President George W. Bush, but no damage was done to the house.

== See also ==
- List of North American tornadoes and tornado outbreaks
- List of United States tornadoes from September to October 2019
