= Interstate 42 (Arkansas) =

Partially completed Interstate Highway in Arkansas

Interstate 42
- Springdale Northern Bypass
- Open segment as of 2026 in red

Route information
- Maintained by ArDOT
- Length: 10.0 mi (16.1 km)
- Existed: September 4, 2026–present
- NHS: Entire route

Major junctions
- West end: Future I-42 / US 412 in Tontitown
- AR 642 in Springdale; AR 112 in Springdale
- East end: I-49 / US 62 / US 71 in Springdale

Location
- Country: United States
- State: Arkansas
- Counties: Washington, Benton

Highway system
- Interstate Highway System; Main; Auxiliary; Suffixed; Business; Future; Arkansas Highway System; Interstate; US; State; Business; Spurs; Suffixed; Scenic; Heritage
← AR 41	→ AR 42
← I-555	AR 612	→ I-630

Interstate 42 (I-42), as currently open and known as the Springdale Northern Bypass, is the designation of the U.S. Route 412 (US 412) bypass around Springdale in the U.S. state of Arkansas. It currently consists of a four-lane freeway from a interchange with US 412 in Tontitown to an interchange with Interstate 49 (I-49) in Springdale.

The highway acts as a bypass of US 412 around Springdale, relieving traffic and improving travel between Washington County and western Benton County to the Northwest Arkansas National Airport. The highway is planned to be a four-lane Interstate-standard divided freeway.

== Route description ==
As of 2026, I-42 begins at a complex interchange with US 412, west of Tonitown. The highway then heads northeast, interchanging with the local airport connector, signed as AR 642, which travels northwest towards Northwest Arkansas National Airport. The highway then turns east, encountering a diamond interchange with Highway 112 within the city limits of Springdale signed as exit 6. The highway crosses over Spring Creek and passes to the north of a quarry. The freeway currently ends at a partially completed stack interchange with I-49 and US 71 just outside the limits of Lowell.

== History ==
Arkansas State Highway Commission Chairman Philip Taldo speaks at the ribbon cutting ceremony for I-42 and AR 642 in Springdale

Highway 612
- Location: Springdale
- Length: 4.8 mi (7.7 km)
- Existed: April 30, 2018–September 4, 2026

Construction of the highway began in April 2015 after getting funding through a 10-year, half-cent sales tax generated from a 2012 vote. The highway cost $100.6 million and was the most expensive of 36 projects funded by the tax. The first 4.5-mile (7.2 km) section was planned to be finished by mid-2019, but the entire route was completed a year ahead of schedule. A ribbon-cutting ceremony was held on April 18, 2018, and the highway officially opened to traffic on April 30.

On October 18, 2018, then-future I-42 was designated the "Springdale Officer John T. Hussey Memorial Highway" in honor of the Springdale Police Department officer kidnapped and killed after a traffic stop on December 21, 1975.

Originally, the Springdale Northern Bypass opened to traffic on April 30, 2018, as AR 612 between I-49, and AR 112. An extension westward to US 412 opened on September 4, 2026, and upon the extension opening, the entire bypass was re-designated as part of Interstate 42.

In November 2023, a contract for the extension of US 412 to AR 112 was awarded to Emery Sapp & Sons Inc. for $180.87 million. Construction has begun on the project, and signs warning of the start of construction having already been posted along the highway near Tontitown. The completion of the 6.9-mile project is expected to take approximately 833 days. Another contract for a second portion of the extension, a connection to Northwest Arkansas National Airport, was awarded to Crossland Construction in January 2024. The contract was bid at $127.67 million and is expected to take approximately 1080 days. Both started April 17, 2024. On September 4, 2026, the road opened and was signed as Interstate 42. On the same day, the Northwest Arkansas National Airport Connector Road also opened.

== Future ==
The remaining segment, a connection from I-49 in Lowell to AR 265, is still in the planning phase. No groundbreaking plans or project timelines exist for the segments east of I-49 to US-412 west of the White River.

The portion of US 412 from I-49 in Springdale to I-35 in Noble County, Oklahoma is planned to become I-42. On August 31, 2026, the Federal Highway Administration approved the designation of AR 612 from I-49 west to its connection with US 412 as I-42.

An extension of the Springdale Bypass to the east is planned to run from the I-49 interchange to US 412 east of Sonora and just west of Beaver Lake. It is not clear if this segment is intended to eventually be signed as part of I-42.

== Exit list ==
County	Location	mi	km	Exit	Destinations	Notes
Washington	Tontitown	0.0	0.0	—	Future I-42 west / US 412 west – Siloam Springs	Western terminus; opened on September 4, 2026
Washington	Tontitown	0.0	0.0	1	US 412 east – Springdale	Opened on September 4, 2026; future exit 17
Benton		5.0	8.0	5	AR 642 north (XNA Access Road)	Access to Northwest Arkansas National Airport; opened on September 4, 2026; future exit 21
Benton	Springdale	6.1	9.8	6	AR 112 – Elm Springs, Cave Springs	Full interchange opened on September 4, 2026; future exit 22
Benton	Springdale	10.0	16.1	10	I-49 / US 71 (US 62) – Lowell, Springdale, Fayetteville	Current eastern terminus; exit 77 and future exit 262 on I-49; future stack interchange; future exit 26
Benton	Springdale	11.3	18.2	11	US 71B (North Thompson Street)	Proposed; future exit 27; expected to break ground in late 2027
Benton	Springdale	12.6	20.3	13	AR 265 (Old Wire Road) – Springdale	Proposed; future exit 29; expected to break ground in late 2027
Washington		18.7	30.1	19	US 412 west – Springdale	Proposed; future exit 35; expected to break ground in late 2027
Washington		18.7	30.1	–	US 412 east – Huntsville	Proposed eastern terminus; expected to break ground in late 2027
1.000 mi = 1.609 km; 1.000 km = 0.621 mi: Incomplete access; Unopened
