= Green Barn =

- Green Barn (Destroyed)
- Formerly listed on the U.S. National Register of Historic Places
- Location within Arkansas Location within the United States
- Location: McClure Ave., Lowell, Arkansas
- Coordinates: 36°15′25″N 94°7′27″W
- Area: less than one acre
- Built: 1910
- MPS: Benton County MRA
- NRHP reference No.: 87002368

Significant dates
- Added to NRHP: January 28, 1988
- Removed from NRHP: October 7, 2026

The Green Barn was a historic barn on McClure Avenue in Lowell, Arkansas. It was a square structure with a pyramidal roof topped by a square louvered cupola, that had shed-roof leantos on three sides. The building was earthfast, with posts set in the ground. Built c. 1910, it had an unusual shape differing significantly from typical barns of the area.

The barn was listed on the National Register of Historic Places in 1988, at which time it was reported to be significantly deteriorated; and has since been destroyed.

== See also ==
- National Register of Historic Places listings in Benton County, Arkansas
