= Van Winkle's Mill Site =

Archaeological site in Arkansas, United States

Coordinates: 36.2861°N 93.9064°W

- U.S. National Register of Historic Places
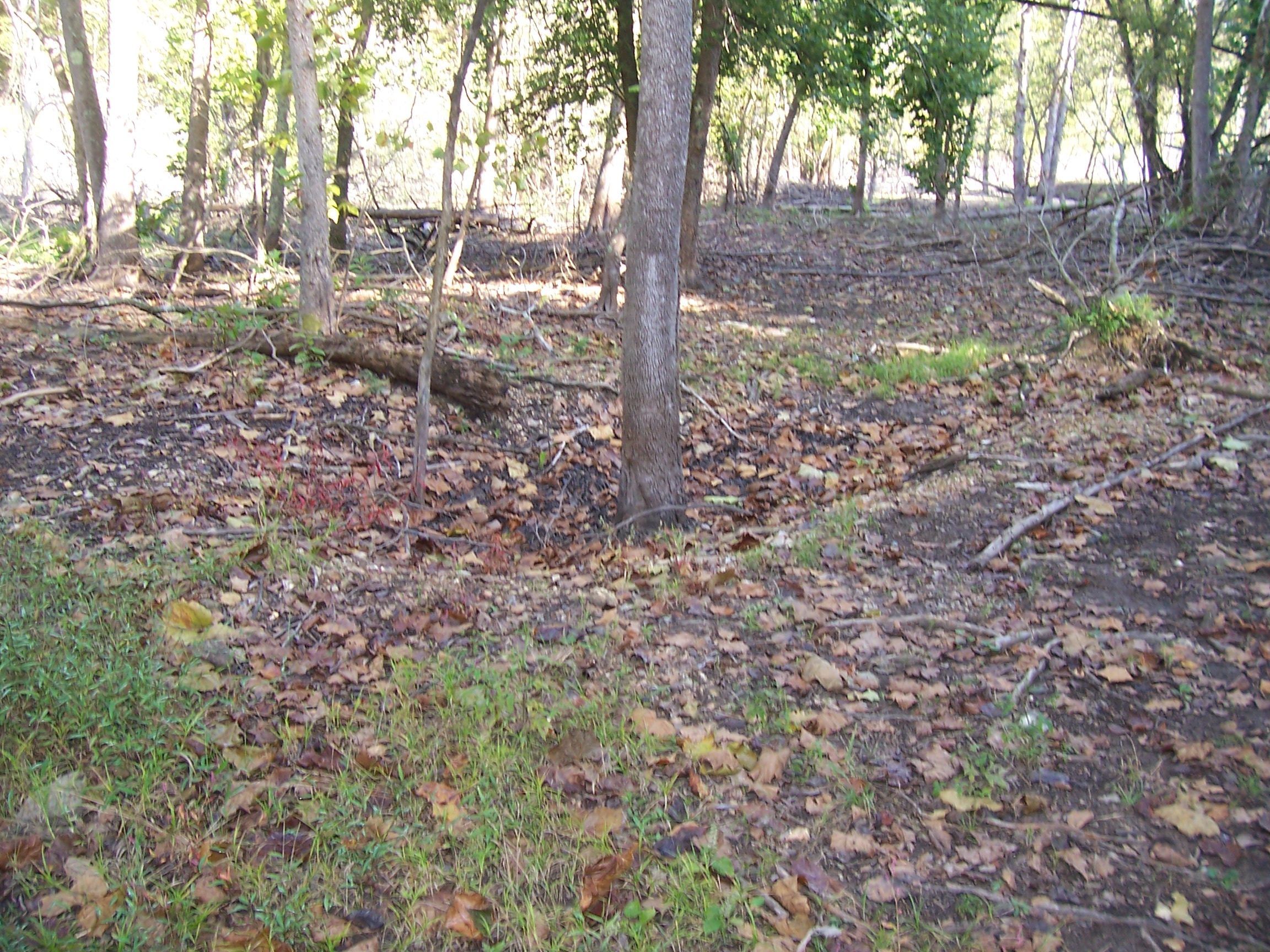

- Location within Arkansas Location within the United States
- Location: 21392 AR 12, Rogers, Arkansas vicinity
- Area: 126 acres (51 ha)
- Built: 1850
- NRHP reference No.: 07001175
- Added to NRHP: November 15, 2007

Van Winkle's Mill Site is a historic 19th-century industrial site at 21392 Arkansas Highway 12 near Rogers, Arkansas, United States. The area, located in the hollow of Little Clifty Creek northeast of the junction of AR 12 with AR 127 (and partly extend across the road to the southwest), includes the foundational remnants of a series of mills operated between 1850 and 1890 by Peter Van Winkle, a major figure in the lumber industry of northwestern Arkansas in the late 19th century. The site included, in addition to mill buildings, Van Winkle's residence, a blacksmith, and quarters used by the workers, which included slaves during the period before the American Civil War.

Oral histories pertaining to the site include claims of a cemetery, but excavations conducted between 1997 and 2005 failed to produce evidence of its location. Van Winkle's first mill and house were burned during the Civil War, and the site was later scavenged for materials after it was abandoned.

The site was listed on the National Register of Historic Places in 2007.

== See also ==
- National Register of Historic Places listings in Benton County, Arkansas
