= Pinkston–Mays Store Building =

- U.S. National Register of Historic Places
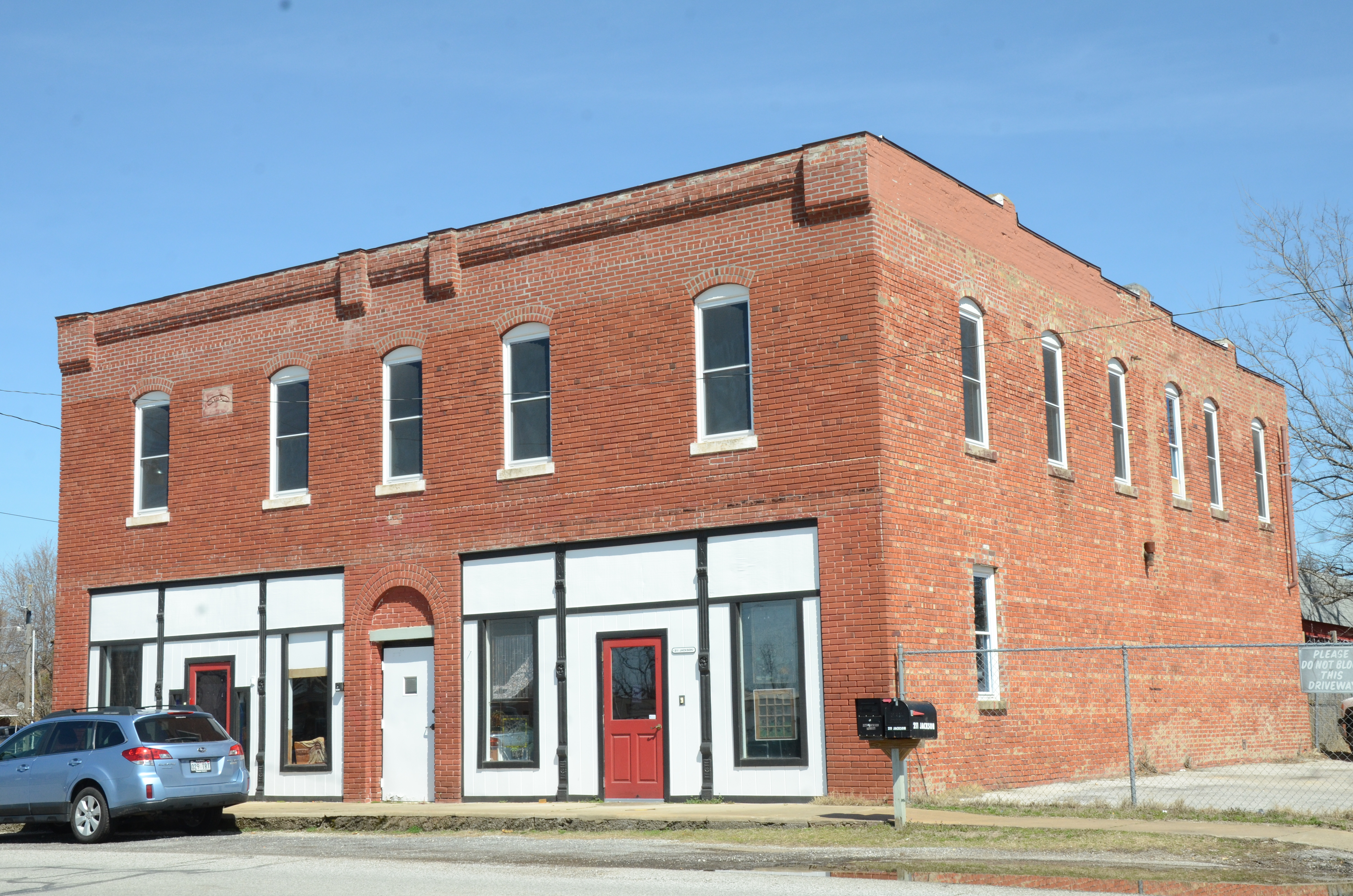

- Location within Arkansas Location within the United States
- Location: 211 Jackson St., Lowell, Arkansas
- Coordinates: 36°15′24″N 94°7′51″W
- Area: less than one acre
- Built: 1902
- MPS: Benton County MRA
- NRHP reference No.: 87002367
- Added to NRHP: January 28, 1988

The Pinkston–Mays Store Building is a historic commercial building at 107-109 Jackson Street in Lowell, Arkansas. It is a two-story brick building with a flat roof, and is divided into two storefronts, separated by a stairway leading to the second floor. The two storefronts are arranged identically, with a central entrance flanked by fixed glass windows. The elements of the first floor facade are separated by brick pilaster, and the storefronts are highlighted by brick corbelling above. Built in 1902, the building is a little-altered local example of early 20th century commercial architecture.

The building was listed on the National Register of Historic Places in 1988.

== See also ==
- National Register of Historic Places listings in Benton County, Arkansas
