= Arkansas Highway 112 =

State highway in Arkansas, United States

Highway 112

Route information
- Maintained by ArDOT
- Length: 25.84 mi (41.59 km)
- Existed: 1926–present

Major junctions
- South end: AR 16S in Fayetteville
- I-49 / US 62 / US 71 / US 71B in Fayetteville; US 412 in Tontitown; I-42 in Springdale
- North end: AR 12 in Bentonville

Location
- Country: United States
- State: Arkansas
- Counties: Washington, Benton

Highway system
- Arkansas Highway System; Interstate; US; State; Business; Spurs; Suffixed; Scenic; Heritage
← AR 111	→ AR 113

Arkansas Highway 112 (AR 112) is a north–south state highway in Northwest Arkansas. The route runs 25.84 miles (41.59 km) from Highway 16S in Fayetteville north to Highway 12 in Bentonville.

== Route description ==
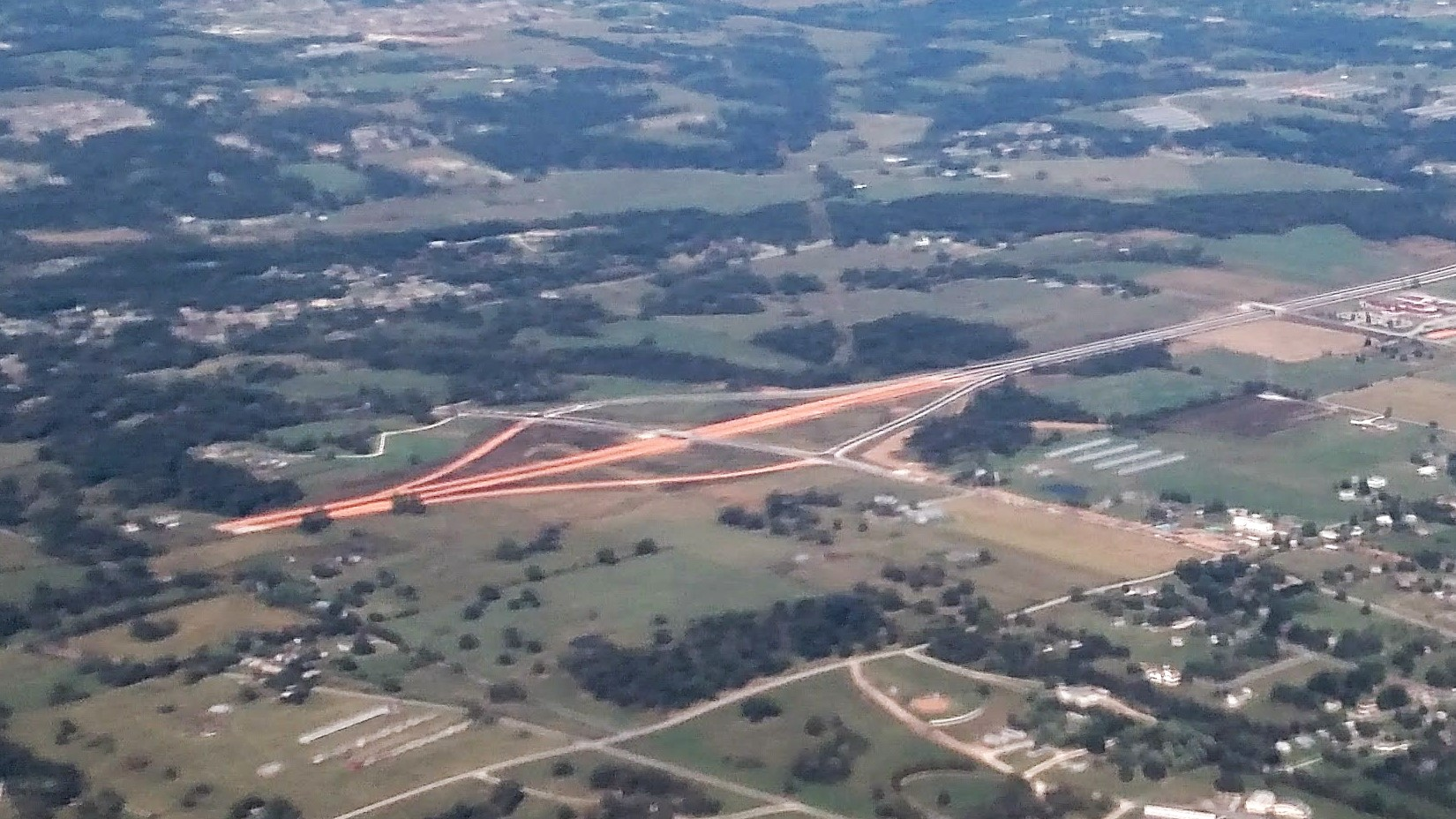
Intersection with US 412 Bypass under construction, 2017

Highway 112 begins at Highway 16S (Wedington Drive) in Fayetteville just north of the University of Arkansas campus. The route continues as an important artery through the city. The highway serves as the southern terminus of US 71B at an interchange with I-49/US 62/US 71. Highway 112 continues north to Tontitown as Maestri Road, intersecting US 412 in Tontitown. Continuing north through Elm Springs as Elm Street, the route enters Benton County.

Highway 112 runs north in a brief concurrency with Highway 264 in Cave Springs before entering Bentonville and terminating at Highway 12 near the Bentonville Municipal Airport.

== History ==
Arkansas Highway 112 was one of the original 1926 state highways.

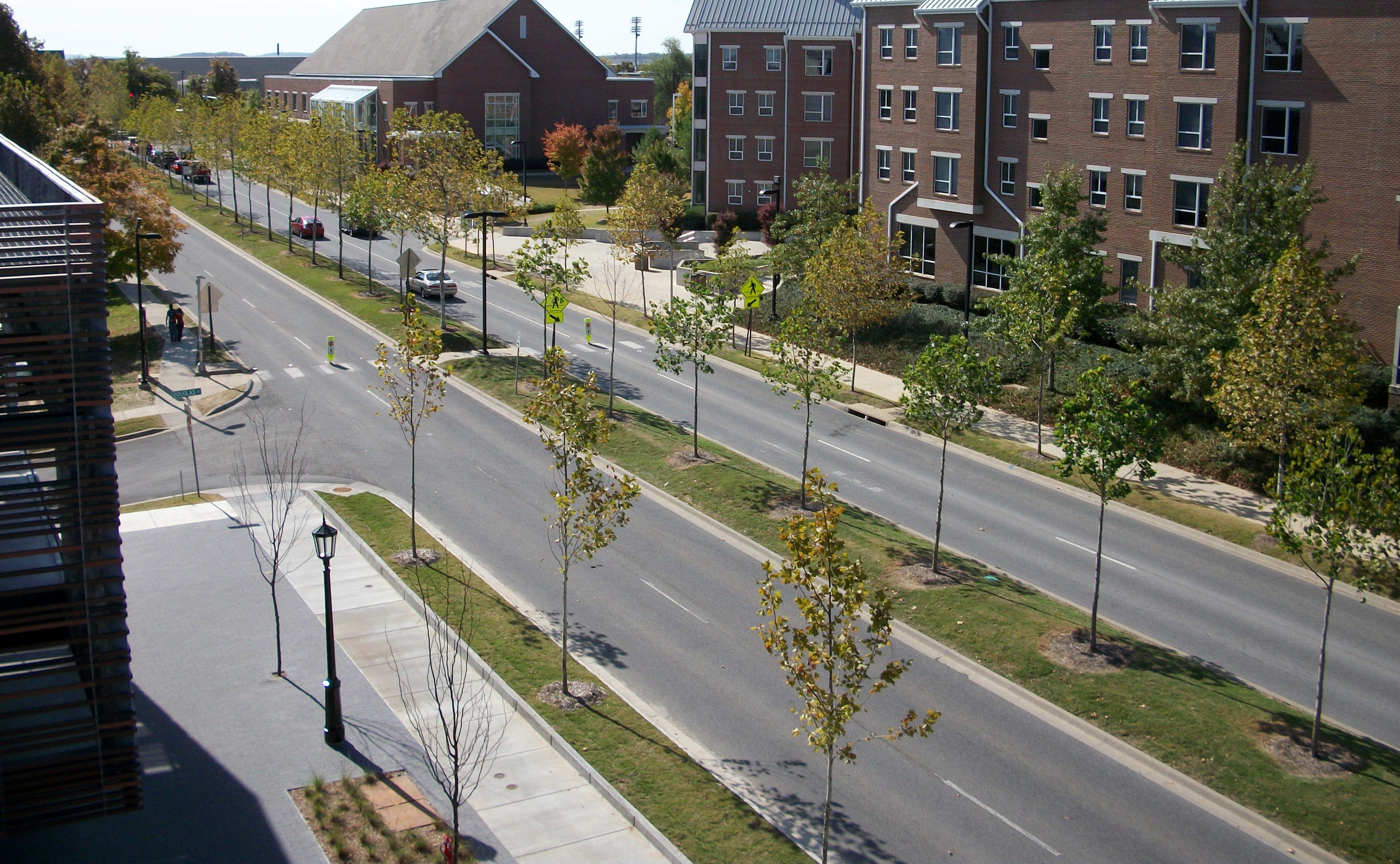
Garland Avenue runs through the north end of the University of Arkansas campus.

Highway 112 was one of the original 1926 state highways. The original Highway 112 was unpaved and ran 2.2 miles (3.5 km) from Arkansas Highway 16 in Fayetteville north to an area south of Johnson. The route was paved in 1948, and extended north to Bentonville in 1951. The Cave Springs to Highway 12 segment was paved at the time of addition, with the entire length becoming paved by 1956. Highway 112S was created in 1971 from a segment of Highway 16.

In the early 2000s, an agreement between the ARDOT, City of Fayetteville, and University of Arkansas to widen Highway 112 to four lanes between Highway 16 (15th Street) and I-49 came into place. Construction began in 2006 between North Street (Highway 112S) to Janice Street and continued intermittently over the years as funding came available. As part of the agreement, ARDOT would build and pay for the widening projects, with Fayetteville accepting the road under city maintenance and control after the widening was complete. The University would maintain landscaping throughout the segment crossing the campus of the University of Arkansas.

The route was truncated to its current northern terminus in February 2012, the route formerly continued along Highway 12 and US 71B to terminate at Highway 72 in Bentonville.

The route closely follows the same path it did during the Civil War and is designated as part of the Arkansas Civil War Trail. Highway 112 is also designated as part of the Arkansas Trail of Tears northern route.

== Future ==
As traffic increased on I-49, Highway 112 became a shortcut to avoid the interstate. However, the route quickly became congested itself due to the growing population of Bentonville and the desire to find a quicker route to reach the Northwest Arkansas National Airport. As a result, the Arkansas Department of Transportation (ArDOT) has made plans to widen a 12 mi (19 km) stretch of the route between US 412 in Tontitown to its northern terminus at Highway 12 in Bentonville. In late-September 2023, the Federal Highway Administration (FHA) approved ArDOT's request for a Finding of No Significant Impact (FONSI), allowing them to begin right-of-way acquisition for the widening of the roadway. The project will expand Highway 112 from two to four lanes with a raised median, curb and gutter, a sidewalk on one side of the highway and a side path on the other side of the highway. At least eight roundabouts will also be constructed. Construction is set to begin in 2025; a completion date has not been announced yet.

Another 5.5 mi (8.9 km) stretch of Highway 112 south of the US 412 intersection will also be widened in the same way, although this will be a separate project from the widening project to the north of US 412.

== Major intersections ==
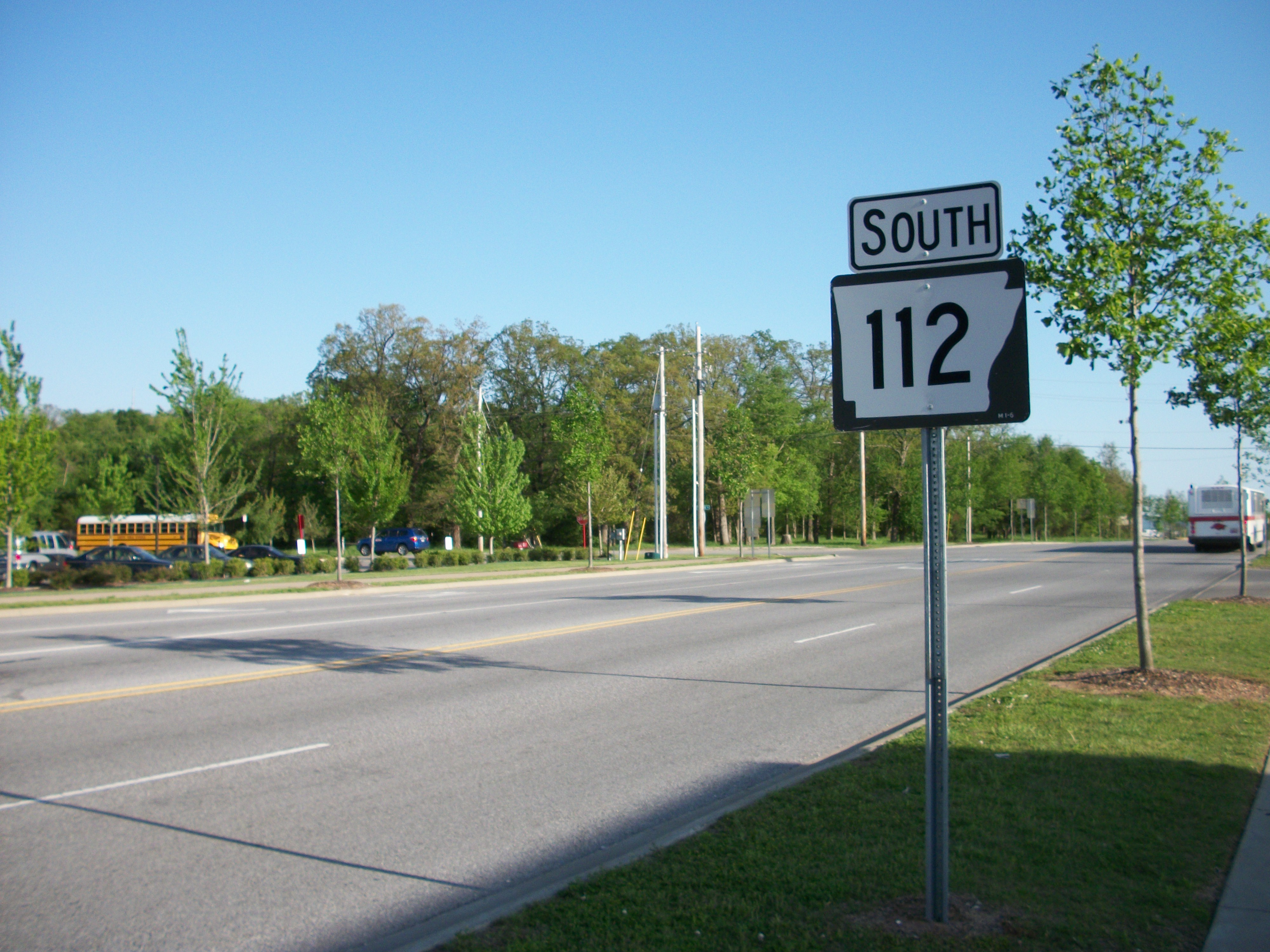
Highway 112 south of the junction with MLK Boulevard

County	Location	mi	km	Destinations	Notes
Washington	Fayetteville	0.00	0.00	AR 16S west (Wedington Drive) – Siloam Springs	Southern terminus; eastern terminus of AR 16S; former AR 112S
Washington	Fayetteville	2.04	3.28	I-49 / US 71 (US 62) / US 71B north (North Fulbright Expressway) – Fort Smith, Springdale	Southern terminus of US 71B; exit 67A and future exit 252A on I-49
Washington	Tontitown	7.97	12.83	US 412 (Henri De Tonti Boulevard) – Springdale, Siloam Springs	
Benton	Springdale			I-42 – Siloam Springs, Bentonville	Exit 6 and future exit 22 on I-42
Benton	Cave Springs	16.98– 17.35	27.33– 27.92	AR 264 – Lowell, Northwest Arkansas National Airport	
Benton	Bentonville	22.67	36.48	AR 12 west (SW Regional Airport Blvd.)	Northern terminus; eastern terminus of AR 12
1.000 mi = 1.609 km; 1.000 km = 0.621 mi: Concurrency terminus
