= I42 =

I42, I-42, or Interstate 42 may refer to:

- Interstate 42 (North Carolina), a U.S. Interstate Highway running through North Carolina
- Interstate 42 (Arkansas), a U.S. Interstate Highway running through Arkansas and proposed to extend through Oklahoma
- HMS Campbeltown (I42), a British Royal Navy cruiser
