= Arkansas Highway 12 =

Highway in Arkansas

Highway 12

Route information
- Maintained by ArDOT
- Existed: 1926–present

Section 1
- Length: 26.0 mi (41.8 km)
- West end: SH-116 at the Oklahoma state line in Cherokee City
- Major intersections: AR 59 / AR 264 at Gentry
- East end: AR 112 in Bentonville

Section 2
- Length: 29.9 mi (48.1 km)
- West end: US 62 / AR 94 in Rogers
- East end: AR 23 east of Clifty

Location
- Country: United States
- State: Arkansas
- Counties: Benton, Madison

Highway system
- Arkansas Highway System; Interstate; US; State; Business; Spurs; Suffixed; Scenic; Heritage
← AR 11	→ AR 13

Arkansas Highway 12 (AR 12) is a designation for two state highways in Northwest Arkansas, in the United States. One segment of 26.0 miles (41.8 km) runs from the Oklahoma state line east to Highway 112 in Bentonville. A second segment of 29.9 miles (48.1 km) runs from US 62 in Rogers east to Highway 23 near Clifty.

== Route description ==
=== Oklahoma to Bentonville ===
Highway 12 begins at the Oklahoma state line as a continuation of OK-116 and runs east, crossing Highway 43 before entering Gentry. Highway 12 meets Highway 59B (Collins Avenue) and Highway 59 (Gentry Boulevard) before leaving the city. The highway continues east through Springtown and Highfill, meeting Highway 264 in south Highfill. Highway 12 angles north past Northwest Arkansas National Airport to Vaughn before meeting Highway 112 in Bentonville, where it terminates.

=== Rogers to Clifty ===
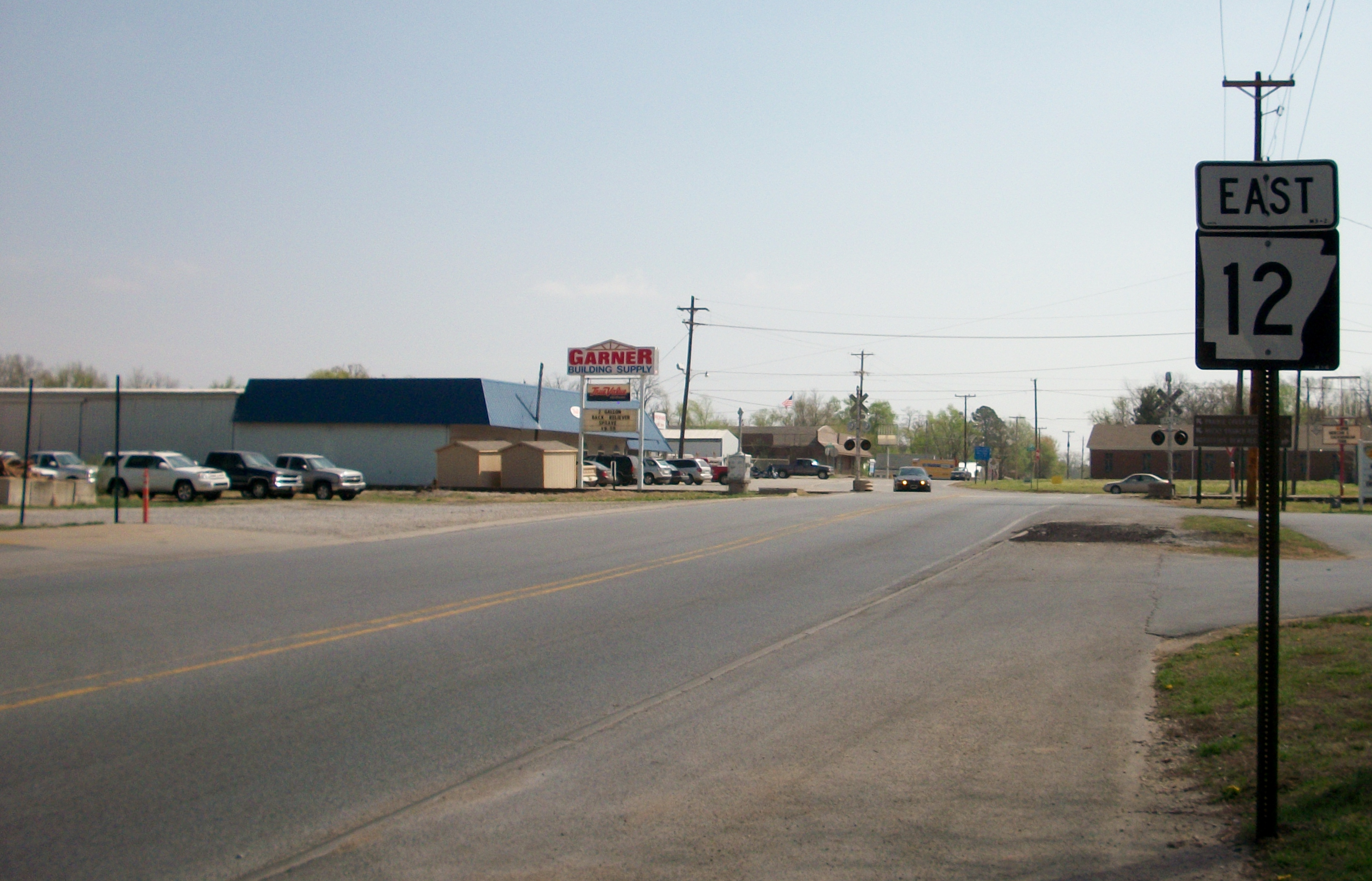
Highway 12 in east Rogers.

The route begins at US 62/Highway 94 in Rogers. Highway 12 leaves Rogers, heading east a winding two-lane road with several steep grades and hairpin curves around Beaver Lake. The route meets Highway 303 near War Eagle and Highway 127 near Clifty, when the route terminates at Highway 23.

From Rogers east to Clifty, the Scenic Highway 12 East Association maintains a website which outlines various points of interest on this segment of highway. Hydrologically, Highway 12 lies within the Arkansas River catchment basin.

== Major intersections ==
County	Location	mi	km	Destinations	Notes
Benton		0.0	0.0	SH-116 west – Colcord	Continuation into Oklahoma
Benton		0.5	0.80	AR 43 – Maysville, Siloam Springs	
Benton	Gentry	5.8	9.3	AR 59B (Collins Avenue)	
Benton	Gentry	6.0	9.7	AR 59 (South Gentry Boulevard) – Gravette, Siloam Springs	
Benton	Highfill	14.0	22.5	AR 264 east – Cave Springs, Northwest Arkansas National Airport	Western terminus of AR 264
Benton	Highfill			Regional Avenue – Airport	
Benton	Vaughn	20.1	32.3	AR 279 north (South Vaughn Road) to AR 102	Southern terminus of AR 279
Benton	Bentonville	26.0	41.8	AR 112 south (Southwest I Street) – Cave Springs	Eastern terminus; northern terminus of AR 112
Benton	Gap in route				
Benton	Rogers	0.0	0.0	US 62 / AR 94 – Eureka Springs, Little Flock, Pea Ridge, Fayetteville	Western terminus
Benton	Rogers			North 2nd Street – Fayetteville	Former US 62B/AR 12
Benton		11.5	18.5	AR 303 north – Rocky Branch Recreation Area	Southern terminus of AR 303
Benton	Lookout	16.5	26.6	AR 127 south	Northern terminus of AR 127
Madison		23.5	37.8	AR 45 south to US 412	Southern terminus of AR 45
Madison		28.7	46.2	AR 127 north	Southern terminus of AR 127
Madison		29.9	48.1	AR 23 – Eureka Springs, Huntsville	Eastern terminus
1.000 mi = 1.609 km; 1.000 km = 0.621 mi: Concurrency terminus

== History ==
Highway 12 was one of the original 1926 state highways.

The route from Oklahoma to Rogers was originally designated as Arkansas State Road B-27 in Arkansas' initial state highway system of 1924. The route was unpaved. Upon redesignation in 1926, Arkansas Highway 12 was the major east–west route of north Arkansas, running from Oklahoma to Ash Flat via Harrison. This Highway 12 was a precursor to U.S. Route 62 in Arkansas, which supplanted Highway 12 almost entirely in 1930. The portion not replaced by US 62 remained Highway 12, and is very similar to the present-day alignment. The routing was changed slightly in August 2010 when Highway 12 replaced US 62B in east Rogers.

Despite no major routing changes since 1930, Highway 12 has seen major change along its shoulders. Running through small mountain towns at inception, today Highway 12 serves America's sixth–fastest growing metropolitan area.
