= Sonora, Arkansas =

- Unincorporated community
- Sonora's position in Arkansas Sonora, Arkansas (the United States)
- Coordinates: 36°9′55″N 94°2′42″W
- Country: United States
- State: Arkansas
- County: Washington
- Township: Springdale
- Elevation: 981 ft (299 m)
- Time zone: UTC-6 (Central (CST))
  - Summer (DST): UTC-5 (CDT)
- ZIP code: 72764
- Area code: 479
- GNIS feature ID: 55002

Sonora is an unincorporated community in Springdale Township in northeastern Washington County, Arkansas, United States. It is located at the intersection of US 412 and Sonora Road, east of Springdale. The upper reaches of Beaver Lake on the White River lie less than two miles to the east and south.
