= Arkansas Highway 642 =

State highway in Arkansas, US

Highway 642

Route information
- Maintained by ArDOT
- Length: 3.6 mi (5.8 km)
- Existed: September 4, 2026–present

Major junctions
- South end: I-42 near Elm Springs
- North end: AR 264 near Northwest Arkansas National Airport

Location
- Country: United States
- State: Arkansas
- Counties: Benton

Highway system
- Arkansas Highway System; Interstate; US; State; Business; Spurs; Suffixed; Scenic; Heritage
← I-630	→ AR 657

Arkansas Highway 642 (AR 642) is a north–south state highway in Northwest Arkansas that connects Interstate 42 to Northwest Arkansas National Airport. Opened on September 4, 2026, as part of the Springdale Northern Bypass project, the highway serves as an important connector to the airport from Washington County and western Benton County.

== History ==
On September 4, 2026, the connector road from Interstate 42 to Northwest Arkansas National Airport opened the same day as Phase 2 of Springdale Northern Bypass opened.

== Future ==
An extension northward to Interstate 49 near Centerton has been proposed by ARDOT on May 25, 2023.

== Major intersections ==
The entire route is in Benton County.

Location	mi	km	Destinations	Notes
	0.0	0.0	I-42 – Siloam Springs, Bentonville	Southern terminus
	3.6	5.8	AR 264	Northern terminus
1.000 mi = 1.609 km; 1.000 km = 0.621 mi
