= Creech, Arkansas =

Unincorporated community in Arkansas, US

Creech
- unincorporated community
- Interactive map of Creech
- Coordinates: 36°13′35″N 94°02′08″W
- Country: United States
- State: Arkansas
- County: Benton
- Post office established: 1880
- Post office discontinued: 1905

Creech is an unincorporated community in Benton County, Arkansas, United States.

A post office was established at Creech in 1880, and remained in operation until being discontinued in 1905.
