= Cave Springs, Arkansas =

City in Arkansas, United States

- City
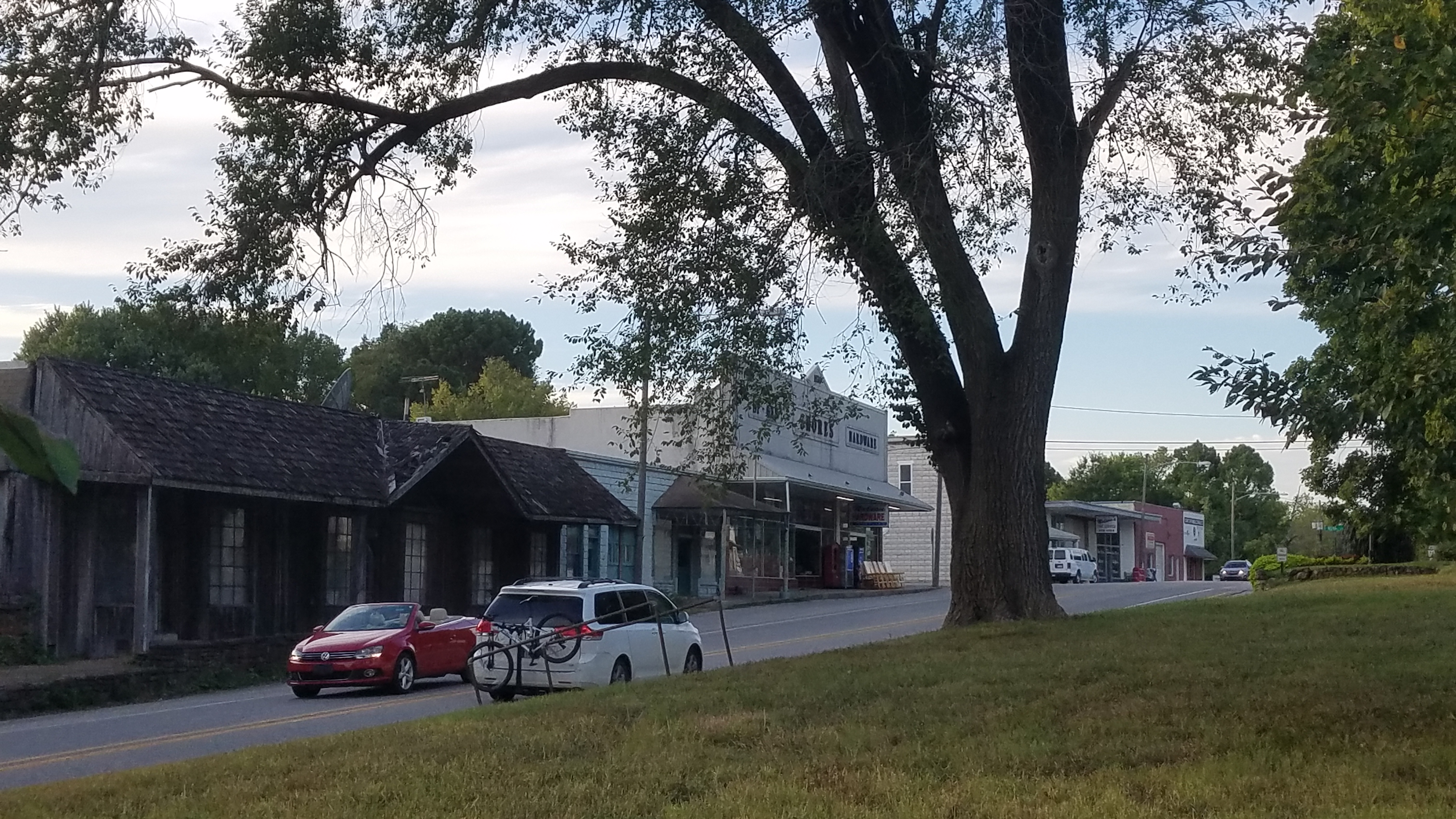
- Downtown Cave Springs looking north along Highway 112.

- Flag Logo
- Etymology: Two caves with natural springs
- Motto: Bright Day Dawning
- Location of Cave Springs in Benton County, Arkansas.
- Coordinates: 36°16′14″N 94°13′21″W
- Country: United States
- State: Arkansas
- County: Benton
- Established: March 8, 1910

Government
  - Type: Mayor–council
  - Mayor: Randall Noblett

Area
  - Total: 7.81 sq mi (20.24 km^{2})
  - Land: 7.76 sq mi (20.09 km^{2})
  - Water: 0.054 sq mi (0.14 km^{2})
- Elevation: 1,237 ft (377 m)

Population (2020)
  - Total: 5,495
  - Estimate (2025): 6,701 ▲
  - Density: 708.2/sq mi (273.45/km^{2})
- Time zone: UTC-6 (Central (CST))
  - Summer (DST): UTC-5 (CDT)
- ZIP code: 72718
- Area code: 479
- FIPS code: 05-12340
- GNIS feature ID: 2404010
- Website: www.cavespringsar.gov

Cave Springs is a city in Benton County, Arkansas. The population was 5,495 at the time of the 2020 census, up from 1,729 in 2010 census. It is part of the Northwest Arkansas metropolitan area. In June 2022, Cave Springs was named the 3rd highest average home values in the state of Arkansas.

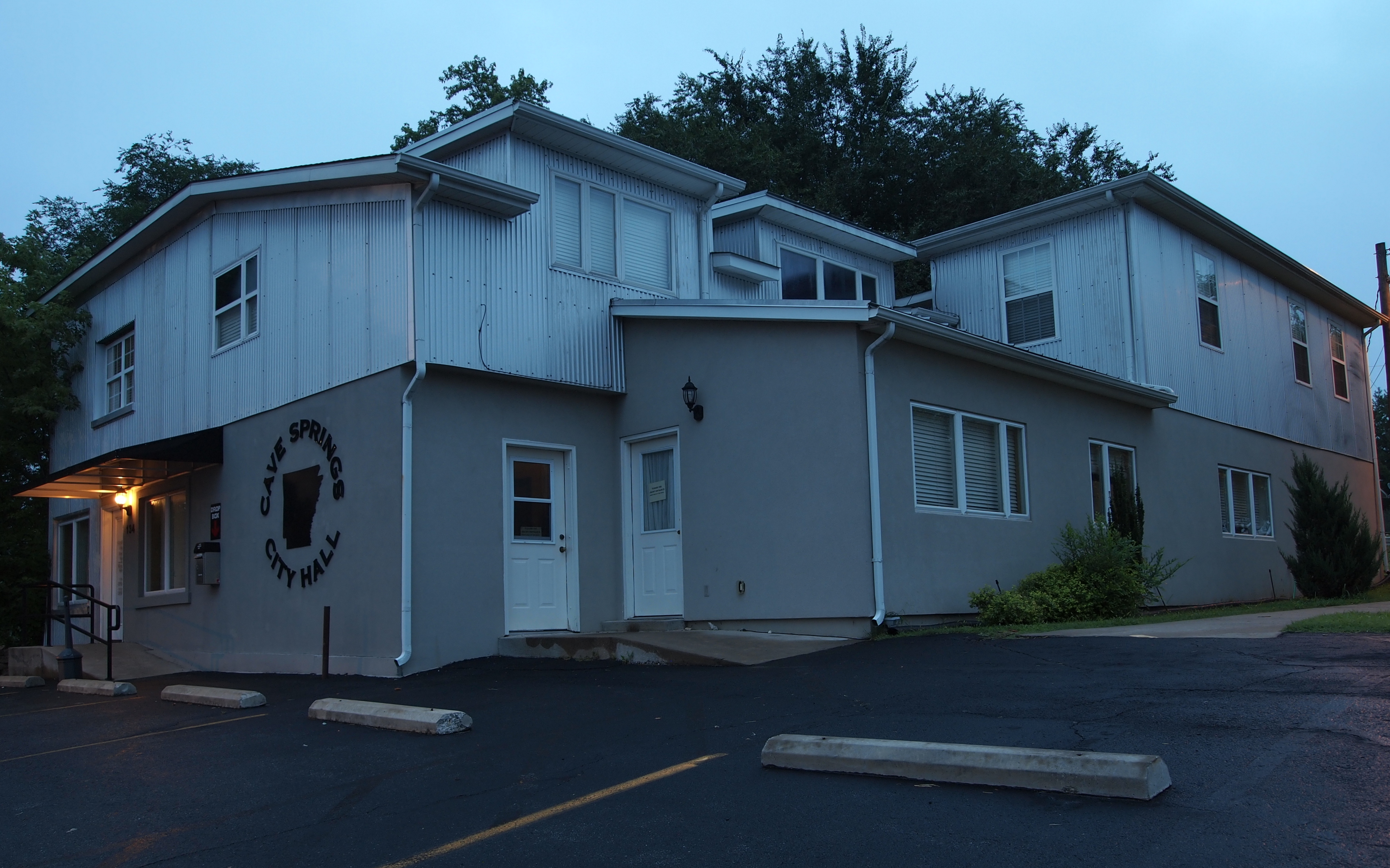
The city hall of Cave Springs. This photo is taken after an early morning rain.

== Geography ==
Cave Springs is located in south central Benton County in the valley of Osage Creek. AR 112 leads north 8 miles (13 km) to Bentonville and south 16 miles (26 km) to Fayetteville. AR 264 leads east 6 miles (10 km) to Lowell and west (as Healing Springs Road) 5 miles (8 km) to Northwest Arkansas National Airport.

According to the United States Census Bureau, the city has a total area of 6.9 square miles (18.0 km^{2}), of which 6.9 square miles (17.8 km^{2}) is land and 0.077 square miles (0.2 km^{2}), or 0.84%, is water. Lake Keith, a small water basin in the middle of Cave Springs, harbors the rare Ozark Cavefish (Amblyopsis rosae). In October 2013, Lake Keith was temporarily drained.

Water from Lake Keith feeds into the Osage Creek, a tributary of the Illinois River.

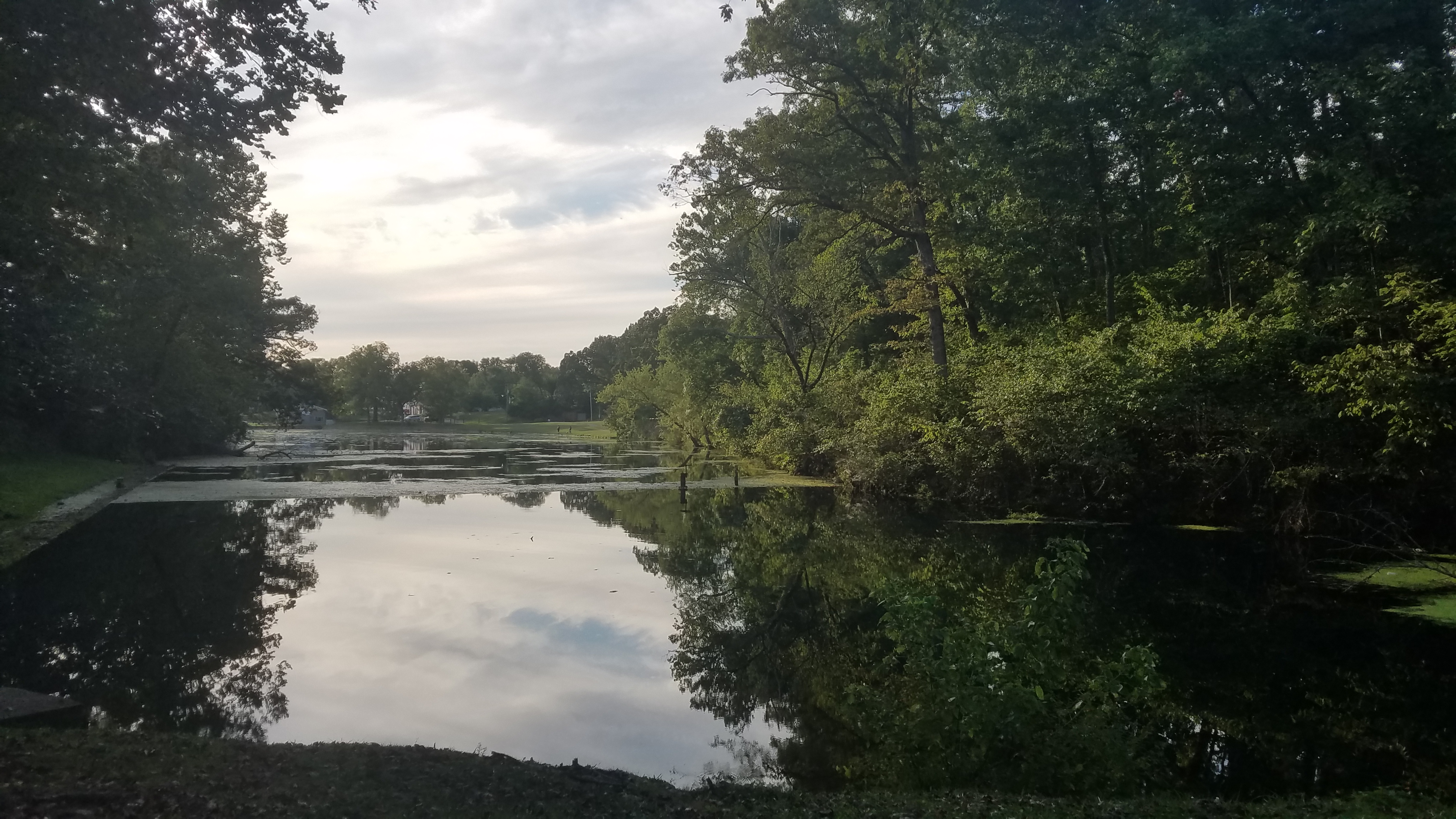
Eastern shore of Lake Keith, looking west.

== Demographics ==
Historical population
Census	Pop.	Note	%±
1930	192		—
1940	285		48.4%
1950	267		−6.3%
1960	281		5.2%
1970	469		66.9%
1980	429		−8.5%
1990	465		8.4%
2000	1,103		137.2%
2010	1,729		56.8%
2020	5,495		217.8%
2025 (est.)	6,701	▲	21.9%
U.S. Decennial Census; 2015 Estimate

=== 2020 census ===
As of the 2020 census, Cave Springs had a population of 5,495. The median age was 33.6 years. 33.5% of residents were under the age of 18 and 7.1% were 65 years of age or older. For every 100 females, there were 100.1 males, and for every 100 females age 18 and over there were 96.4 males age 18 and over. The population density was 250.9 people per square mile.

83.0% of residents lived in urban areas, while 17.0% lived in rural areas.

There were 1,787 households and 1,255 families in the city. Of all households, 53.7% had children under the age of 18 living in them. 78.0% were married-couple households, 7.9% were households with a male householder and no spouse or partner present, and 10.9% were households with a female householder and no spouse or partner present. About 9.9% of all households were made up of individuals, and 3.3% had someone living alone who was 65 years of age or older. There were 1,873 housing units, of which 4.6% were vacant. The homeowner vacancy rate was 2.3% and the rental vacancy rate was 7.8%.

Cave Springs racial composition
Race	Number	Percentage
White (non-Hispanic)	4,508	82.04%
Black or African American (non-Hispanic)	100	1.82%
Native American	49	0.89%
Asian	92	1.67%
Pacific Islander	4	0.07%
Other/Mixed	397	7.22%
Hispanic or Latino	345	6.28%

=== Income and poverty ===
Cave Springs is the wealthiest city in Arkansas. The median income for a household in the city is $114,286. The per capita income for the city is $140,703. Only about 2.6% of the population lies below the poverty line.

== Education ==
Public education for elementary and secondary students is provided by two school districts. Most of the community is within the Bentonville School District. For some residents, public education is zoned to the Rogers School District.

School zoning for the Bentonville schools section is as follows:

- Most is to Evening Star Elementary School while portions are to Central Park-Morning Star Elementary School.
- Bright Field Middle School
- The majority is zoned to Fulbright Junior High School, with some areas to the west within the boundary of Grimsley Junior High School.
- The majority is zoned to Bentonville High School, with some areas to the west within the boundary of Bentonville West High School.

== Government and politics ==
The current mayor is Randall Noblett who was first elected in 2018 after defeating Mayor Travis Lee by a margin of 248 votes.

The current state representatives that serve districts containing portions of Cave Springs are Rep. Kendon Underwood, Rep. Jim Dotson, and Rep. Delia Haak. The current state senator that serves the district containing Cave Springs is Sen. Bart Hester, who is also a resident of the city.

Presidential election results

Cave Springs city vote by party in presidential elections
Year	Democratic	Republican	Third Parties
2020	30.0% 757	67.2% 1,696	2.8% 71
2016	23.2% 337	69.1% 1,002	7.2% 112

== Notable people ==
- Hugh A. Dinsmore, congressman and diplomat
- Bart Hester, member of the Arkansas Senate
- Kendon Underwood, member of the Arkansas House of Representatives
