= Northwest Arkansas National Airport =

Airport in Highfill, Arkansas, USA

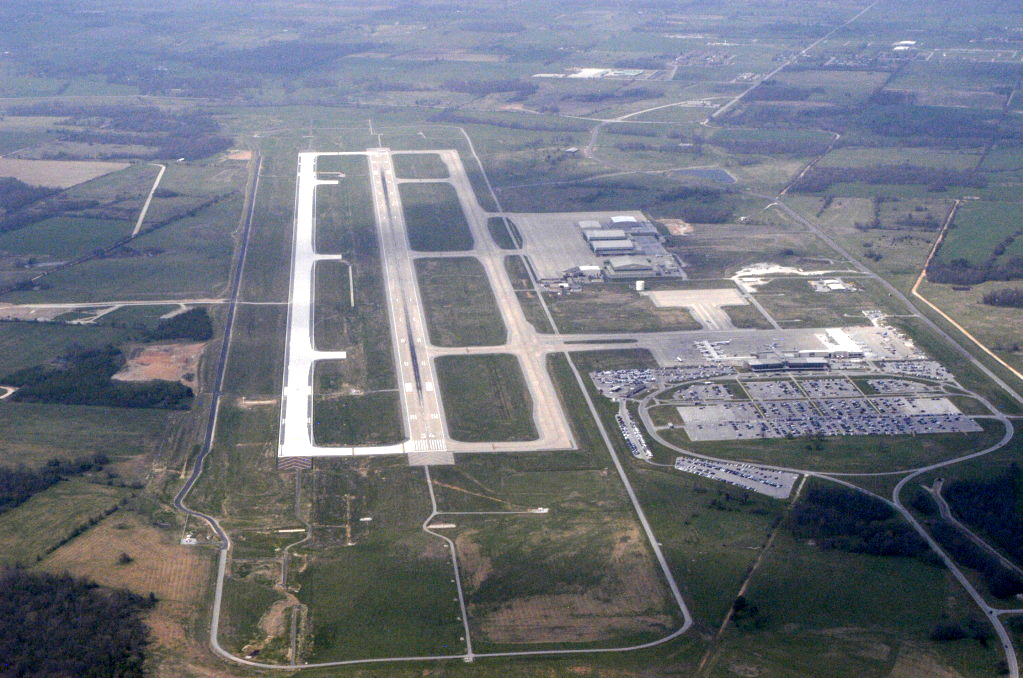
- IATA: XNA; ICAO: KXNA; FAA LID: XNA

Summary
- Airport type: Public
- Owner: Northwest Arkansas Regional Airport Authority
- Serves: Fayetteville, Bentonville, Springdale, Rogers
- Location: 1 Airport Blvd, Bentonville, Arkansas
- Elevation AMSL: 1,288 ft (393 m)
- Coordinates: 36°16′54″N 094°18′28″W
- Website: www.flyxna.com

Maps
- FAA airport diagram
- Interactive map of Northwest Arkansas National Airport

Runways
Direction	Length		Surface
Direction	ft	m	Surface
16L/34R	8,801	2,683	Concrete
16R/34L	8,800	2,682	Concrete

Statistics (2025)
- Aircraft operations: 51,776
- Passenger volume: 2,524,256
- Source: Federal Aviation Administration

Northwest Arkansas National Airport (IATA: XNA, ICAO: KXNA, FAA LID: XNA) in Northwest Arkansas is a public-use airport located in Benton County, Arkansas, serving the rapidly growing Northwest Arkansas region, 15 nautical miles (28 km; 17 mi) northwest of Fayetteville and 10 nautical miles (19 km; 12 mi) northwest of Springdale. Since its opening in 1998, XNA has become a vital transportation hub, reflecting the area's economic expansion and increasing travel demands. In early summer of 2025, XNA surpassed Bill and Hillary Clinton National Airport in Little Rock as the busiest airport by passenger volume in Arkansas.

XNA covers 2,680 acres (1,085 ha) of land and has two parallel 8,800 foot (2,682 m) runways.

XNA's operations benefit significantly from its proximity to the headquarters of major corporations, including Walmart in Bentonville, Tyson Foods in Springdale, and J.B. Hunt Transport Services in Lowell. The airport is also frequently utilized by athletic teams from the University of Arkansas for away games and by Razorback opponents visiting Fayetteville.

XNA is included in the Federal Aviation Administration (FAA) National Plan of Integrated Airport Systems for 2019–2023, in which it is categorized as a small-hub primary commercial service facility.

== History ==
The establishment of XNA was driven by the need to accommodate the region's growing population and economic activities. Prior to XNA, Drake Field in Fayetteville was the region's primary airport, but its operational limitations prompted the search for a more capable facility. In 1990, the Northwest Arkansas Council, a private, non-profit organization, was formed with Alice Walton as its first chairperson. Under her leadership, the Council initiated efforts that led to the creation of the Northwest Arkansas Regional Airport Authority, which included representatives from Bentonville, Fayetteville, Rogers, Siloam Springs, Springdale, and Benton and Washington counties. This collaborative approach culminated in the opening of XNA on November 1, 1998, featuring a single terminal and runway.

In 2023, the Arkansas General Assembly passed legislation allowing regional airport authorities to detach from municipalities without requiring annexation by another municipality. Consequently, on September 19, 2023, XNA initiated the process to detach from the city of Highfill, aiming for equitable regional benefit for all five cities and two counties.

In 2025, XNA set a passenger record, serving 2,524,256 passengers, up 10% from 2024.

=== Expansion ===
In 2007, airport officials announced the construction of a new concourse costing between $20 million and $25 million. The new facility, east of the upper concourse, has allowed the airport to increase its number of airplane parking positions from twelve to twenty. Building the new facility took over three years.

The airport completed a ticket counter expansion in 2010. The airport completed a $21 million expansion to the upper-level concourse that includes the state's first moving walkway. With the walkway, it is anticipated to take about three minutes to get from security to the last gate. The addition added 51,000 square feet (4,700 m^{2}) and twelve upper-level gates to the east side of the airport. The moving walkway, however, is projected to soon be scrapped. Airport officials announced that additional seating and a children's play area will be placed in its current location.

The airport was previously known as Northwest Arkansas Regional Airport. It adopted the name Northwest Arkansas National Airport in December 2019. Airport officials attributed the change to perception, saying that the new name would help attract more airline service.

On September 23, 2021, it was announced that board members took the first steps toward adding a second concourse. The board voted to have staff negotiate with Fentress Architects for conceptual drawings for the first phase of Concourse B. The design work will cost about $185,000. The new concourse would allow the airport to use its boarding gates more efficiently. The board is contemplating bringing some gates on Concourse A back into use for certain aircraft sizes and redesigning others. Phase One would include an elevated walkway, a hold room for passengers and a covered walkway out to a ground-level loading area onto the aircraft. Construction of the project is estimated to cost roughly $35 million to $50 million. Longer range plans call for building out Concourse B to roughly match Concourse A, projected to begin construction in 2026 and be completed in 2028.

In 2023, the airport began a Terminal Modernization Project designed to enhance passenger experience and accommodate growing demand. The project was completed in 2026. Key elements of this project include:

- Updated baggage claims with upgraded conveyor systems.
- New elevators, escalators, and stairwells to improve accessibility and increase vertical redundancy of passenger flow.
- Redesigned pick-up and drop-off areas, with additional traffic lanes for better flow.

Recognizing the need for upgraded infrastructure, the airport began construction of a new air traffic control tower in June 2024. The new tower will replace the existing 57-foot structure, which was originally intended as a temporary solution when the airport opened in 1998.

The new tower will stand at 141 feet to the top of the cab, significantly improving visibility and operational efficiency for air traffic controllers. The enhanced height and modern features of the new tower will enable XNA to better handle increasing air traffic volumes as the region continues to grow. The project also includes an additional air traffic control facility at the base of the tower.

In February 2025, Escape Lounges opened a 2,300-square-foot facility in the airport's main concourse. XNA is the smallest airport in the United States to feature a branded lounge.

At present, excluding Robinson Maneuver Training Center and Little Rock Air Force Base, two military facilities, XNA is the largest commercial/public/general aviation airport in terms of land area (2,680 acres, 4.2 sq.mi.) in the state of Arkansas.

=== Runway ===
The original runway built in 1998 required complete reconstruction in 2011, following the discovery of alkali-silica reaction (ASR) in its Portland cement concrete. Since the runway was the only one at the airport, a temporary runway was necessary to maintain service during reconstruction. Stimulus funds of $9 million ($13.5 million in today's dollars) from the American Reinvestment and Recovery Act (ARRA) allowed XNA to accelerate the alternative runway construction project. Upon completion of the alternate runway in 2012, all aircraft operations were shifted to the new surface and demolition and replacement of the primary runway began.

=== Access road ===
Construction officially began on a Arkansas Highway 642, a four-lane interstate-standard access road on April 17, 2024. Managed by the Arkansas Department of Transportation (ArDOT), the project will be a four-lane highway, extending approximately 4 miles from the airport entrance at Highway 264 to Highway 612, also known as the Springdale Bypass. Once completed, the road will provide a much-needed connection to the airport, improving travel times and accessibility for passengers and businesses in the region.

The need for this access road has been discussed for more than two decades. This project is expected to greatly improve safety, reducing the number of accidents caused by heavy traffic on narrow, rural routes leading to the airport.

The access road is expected to be completed and opened by late August 2026.

== Facilities ==
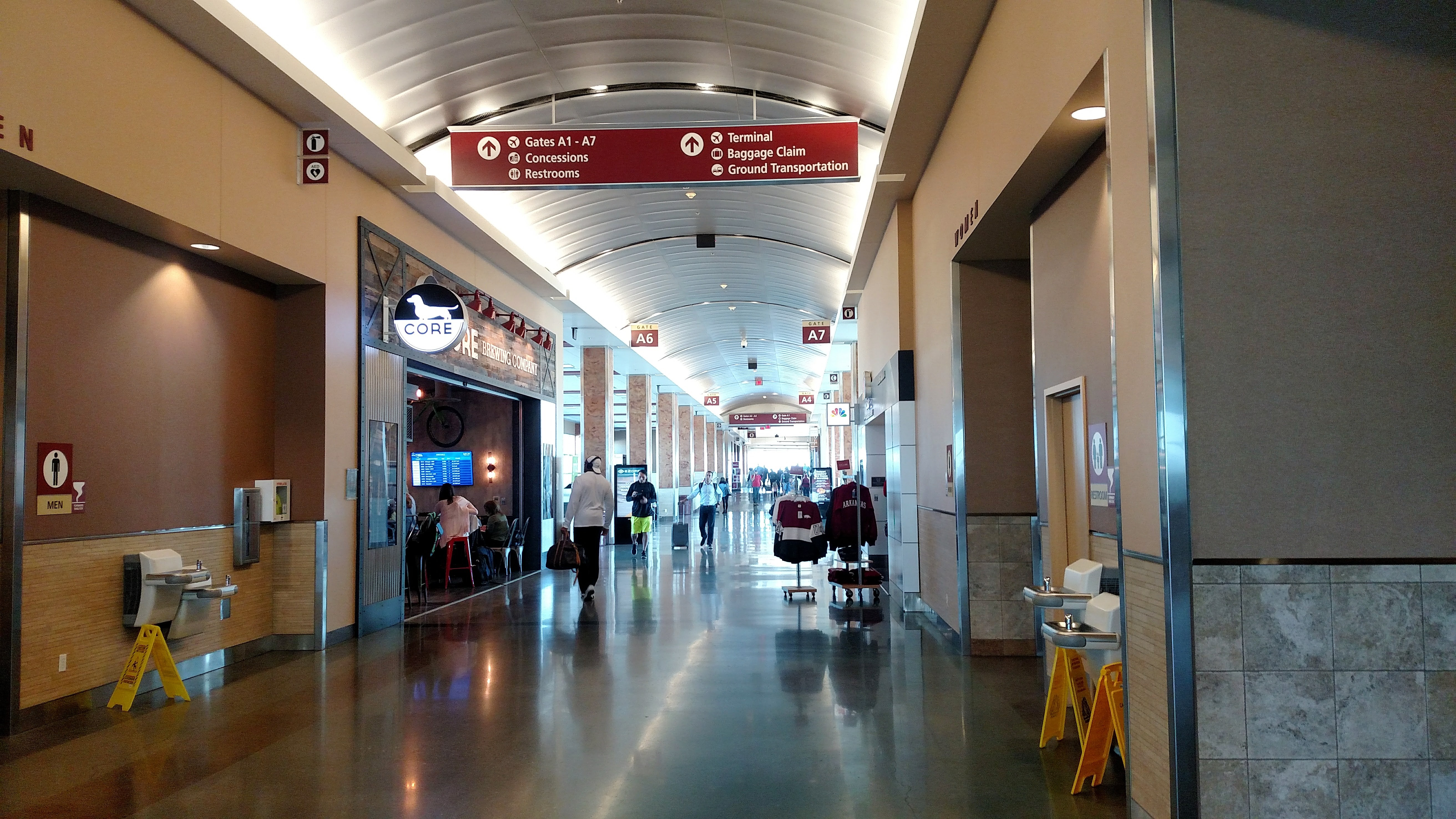
Terminal view

The airport covers 2,680 acres (1,085 ha) at an elevation of 1,288 feet (393 m). It has two runways, 16R/34L and 16L/34R. 16L/34R is 8,801 feet long by 150 feet (2,683 x 46 m) wide and 16R/34L is 8,800 feet long by 150 feet (2,682 x 46 m) wide.

== Airlines and destinations ==
=== Passenger ===
Airlines	Destinations
Allegiant Air	Destin/Fort Walton Beach, Fort Lauderdale, Gulf Shores, Las Vegas, Nashville, Orlando/Sanford, Phoenix/Mesa, St. Petersburg/Clearwater
American Airlines	Charlotte, Dallas/Fort Worth, Phoenix–Sky Harbor
American Eagle	Charlotte, Chicago–O'Hare, Dallas/Fort Worth, Los Angeles, Miami, New York–LaGuardia, Philadelphia, Phoenix–Sky Harbor, Washington–National
Breeze Airways	New Orleans, Pensacola, Tampa; Seasonal: Orlando
Delta Air Lines	Atlanta
Delta Connection	Atlanta, Austin (begins March 8, 2027), Detroit, Minneapolis/St. Paul, New York–LaGuardia, Salt Lake City
Frontier Airlines	Denver
United Airlines	Denver
United Express	Chicago–O'Hare, Denver, Houston–Intercontinental, Newark

== Statistics ==
=== Top destinations ===
Busiest domestic routes from XNA (September 2025 – August 2026)
Rank	City	Passengers	Carriers
1	Dallas/Fort Worth, Texas	243,710	American
2	Atlanta, Georgia	160,590	Delta
3	Chicago–O'Hare, Illinois	137,280	American, United
4	Denver, Colorado	109,160	Frontier, United
5	Charlotte, North Carolina	93,420	American
6	Houston–Intercontinental, Texas	74,880	United
7	New York–LaGuardia	63,220	American, Delta
8	Phoenix-Sky Harbor, Arizona	63,080	American
9	Minneapolis/St. Paul, Minnesota	34,980	Delta
10	Los Angeles, California	28,870	American

=== Annual traffic ===
Annual passenger traffic at XNA 1999–present
Year	Passengers	Year	Passengers	Year	Passengers
1999	653,022	2009	1,083,638	2019	1,846,374
2000	725,175	2010	1,139,801	2020	721,107
2001	735,822	2011	1,127,909	2021	1,234,328
2002	786,948	2012	1,135,023	2022	1,682,351
2003	892,489	2013	1,160,032	2023	1,982,866
2004	1,020,146	2014	1,276,851	2024	2,293,352
2005	1,168,858	2015	1,295,235	2025	2,524,256
2006	1,172,049	2016	1,396,738	2026	
2007	1,200,122	2017	1,438,922	2027	
2008	1,146,954	2018	1,574,610	2028	

Note: In November and December 1998, the airport's first two months of operations, XNA served 53,565 passengers.

=== Airline market share ===
Largest airlines at XNA (September 2025 – August 2026)
Rank	Airline	Passengers	Share
1	Envoy Air	686,000	27.34%
2	SkyWest Airlines	365,000	12.73%
3	Endeavor Air	284,000	11.33%
4	American Airlines	244,000	9.72%
5	Allegiant Air	213,000	8.49%
–	Others	716,000	28.56%

== See also ==
- List of airports in Arkansas
