= Lowell, Arkansas =

- City
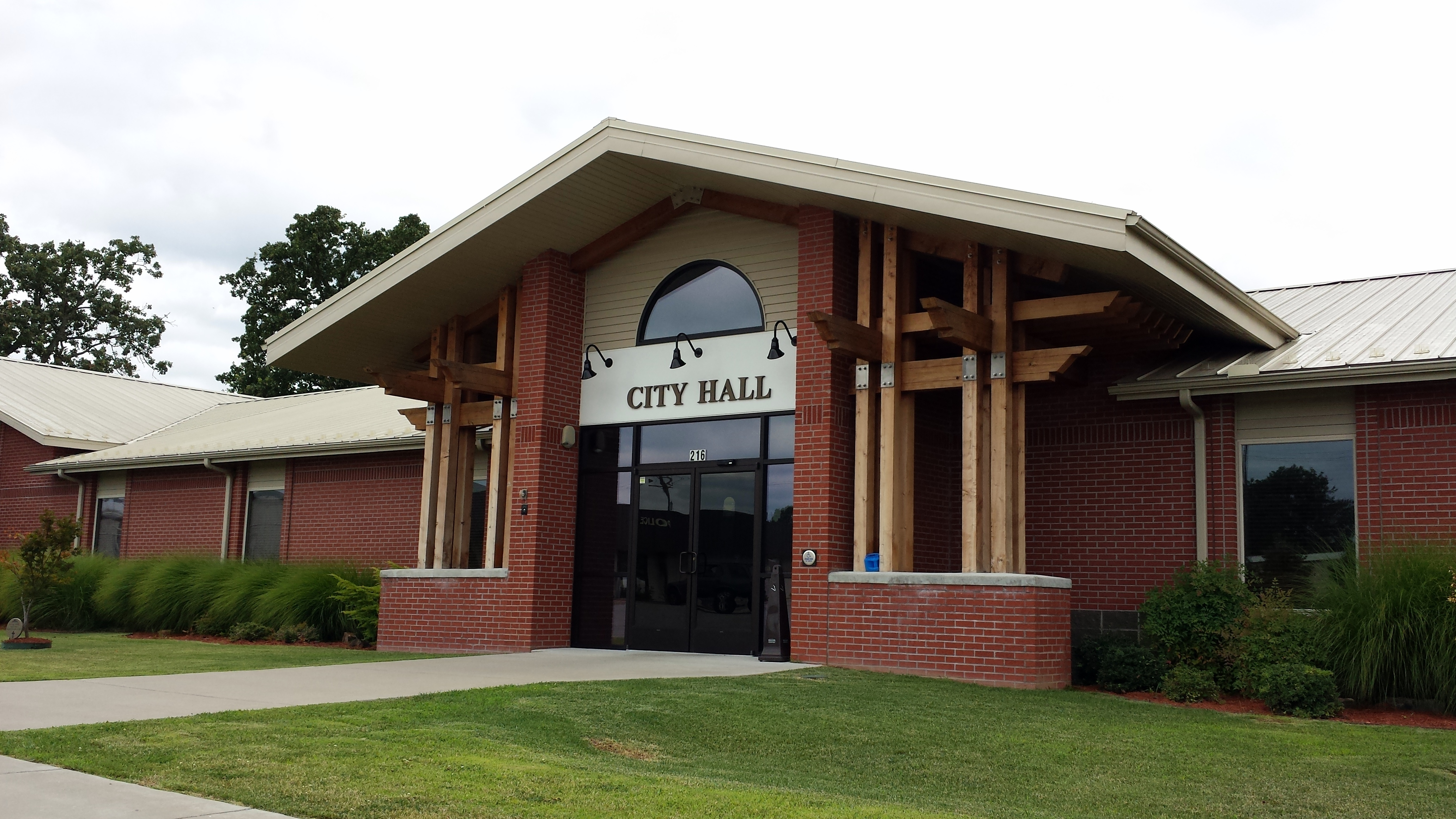
- City Hall

- Seal

- Location of Lowell in Benton County, Arkansas.
- Coordinates: 36°15′22″N 94°09′12″W
- Country: United States
- State: Arkansas
- County: Benton
- Incorporated: 1881

Government
  - Mayor: Chris Moore

Area
  - Total: 9.68 sq mi (25.06 km^{2})
  - Land: 9.61 sq mi (24.90 km^{2})
  - Water: 0.062 sq mi (0.16 km^{2})
- Elevation: 1,322 ft (403 m)

Population (2020)
  - Total: 9,839
  - Estimate (2025): 12,184 ▲
  - Density: 1,023.4/sq mi (395.15/km^{2})
- Time zone: UTC-6 (Central)
  - Summer (DST): UTC-5 (Central)
- ZIP code: 72745
- Area code: 479
- FIPS code: 05-41720
- GNIS feature ID: 2404965
- Website: www.lowellarkansas.gov

Lowell is a city in Benton County, Arkansas, United States. Located within the Ozarks, the first settlement was along Old Wire Road in the 1840s, and although destroyed during the Civil War, the community was reestablished by J. R. McClure and thrived when the St. Louis–San Francisco Railway came through the area in the 1880s. The city is a growing bedroom community within the rapidly growing Northwest Arkansas region. Lowell is the headquarters of trucking company J.B. Hunt. Lowell's population was 9,839 at the 2020 census, an increase of 34% since 2010.

== History ==
Lowell was platted in 1881. A post office has been in operation at Lowell since 1881.

== Geography ==
According to the United States Census Bureau, Lowell has a total area of 9.2 square miles (23.9 km^{2}), of which 9.2 square miles (23.7 km^{2}) is land and 0.077 square miles (0.2 km^{2}), or 0.68%, is water. Lowell is located in southern Benton County and is bordered by the cities of Springdale to the south, Cave Springs to the west and Rogers to the north. 4 miles (6 km) to the east is Beaver Lake, a large reservoir of the White River.

=== Metropolitan area ===
Northwest Arkansas consists of three Arkansas counties: Benton, Madison, and Washington. The area had a population of 347,045 at the 2000 census which had increased to 463,204 by the 2010 Census (an increase of 33.47 per cent). The area does not have the usual principal-city-with-suburbs morphology; instead, the four principal cities are located in a line along Interstate 49. Lowell is also along this corridor, between Springdale and Rogers.

== Demographics ==
Historical population
Census	Pop.	Note	%±
1910	193		—
1920	227		17.6%
1930	262		15.4%
1940	271		3.4%
1950	341		25.8%
1960	277		−18.8%
1970	653		135.7%
1980	1,078		65.1%
1990	1,224		13.5%
2000	5,013		309.6%
2010	7,327		46.2%
2020	9,839		34.3%
2025 (est.)	12,184	▲	23.8%
U.S. Decennial Census

=== 2020 census ===
As of the 2020 census, Lowell had a population of 9,839. The median age was 31.8 years. 28.8% of residents were under the age of 18 and 9.5% of residents were 65 years of age or older. For every 100 females there were 98.2 males, and for every 100 females age 18 and over there were 96.0 males age 18 and over. There were 3,487 households, including 2,302 families.

97.3% of residents lived in urban areas, while 2.7% lived in rural areas.

Of all households, 43.2% had children under the age of 18 living in them. 56.7% were married-couple households, 15.6% were households with a male householder and no spouse or partner present, and 20.9% were households with a female householder and no spouse or partner present. About 20.2% of all households were made up of individuals and 6.4% had someone living alone who was 65 years of age or older.

There were 3,589 housing units, of which 2.8% were vacant. The homeowner vacancy rate was 1.4% and the rental vacancy rate was 2.0%.

Racial composition as of the 2020 census
Race	Number	Percent
White	6,326	64.3%
Black or African American	159	1.6%
American Indian and Alaska Native	121	1.2%
Asian	236	2.4%
Native Hawaiian and Other Pacific Islander	185	1.9%
Some other race	1,388	14.1%
Two or more races	1,424	14.5%
Hispanic or Latino (of any race)	2,864	29.1%

=== 2010 census ===
As of the 2010 census, Lowell had a population of 7,327. The racial and ethnic composition of the population was 68.7% non-Hispanic white, 0.9% black or African American, 1.4% Native American, 2.7% Asian, 0.4% Pacific Islander, 2.6% from two or more races and 24.7% Hispanic or Latino.

=== 2000 census ===
As of the 2000 census, there were 5,013 people, 1,914 households, and 1,381 families residing in the city. The population density was 800.7 inhabitants per square mile (309.2/km^{2}). There were 2,044 housing units at an average density of 326.5 per square mile (126.1/km^{2}). The racial makeup of the city was 88.67% White, 0.78% Black or African American, 0.88% Native American, 2.71% Asian, 0.98% Pacific Islander, 4.09% from other races, and 1.90% from two or more races. 8.94% of the population were Hispanic or Latino of any race.

There were 1,914 households, out of which 40.0% had children under the age of 18 living with them, 62.4% were married couples living together, 6.2% had a female householder with no husband present, and 27.8% were non-families. 22.5% of all households were made up of individuals, and 3.8% had someone living alone who was 65 years of age or older. The average household size was 2.62 and the average family size was 3.11.

In the city, the population was spread out, with 28.7% under the age of 18, 10.6% from 18 to 24, 40.5% from 25 to 44, 15.0% from 45 to 64, and 5.1% who were 65 years of age or older. The median age was 29 years. For every 100 females, there were 103.5 males. For every 100 females age 18 and over, there were 104.8 males.

The median income for a household in the city was $48,063, and the median income for a family was $55,944. Males had a median income of $31,677 versus $24,196 for females. The per capita income for the city was $20,861. About 4.4% of families and 5.9% of the population were below the poverty line, including 5.8% of those under age 18 and 19.4% of those age 65 or over.

== Education ==
Public education for elementary and secondary students is provided by Rogers School District. Lowell is home to Lowell Elementary School and Elza R. Tucker Elementary School, both administered by the Rogers School District. The city is also adjacent to Janie Darr Elementary School.

Lowell Elementary feeds into Kirksey Middle School and Tucker and Darr elementaries feed into Elmwood Middle School. Both middle schools feed into Rogers High School.

- Lowell Elementary School was named as a 2015 Arkansas Reward School for Top 5% performance for High Student Performance and Academic Growth.

Grace Lutheran School is a Christian pre-school and grade school of the Wisconsin Evangelical Lutheran Synod in Lowell.

== Infrastructure ==
=== Transportation ===
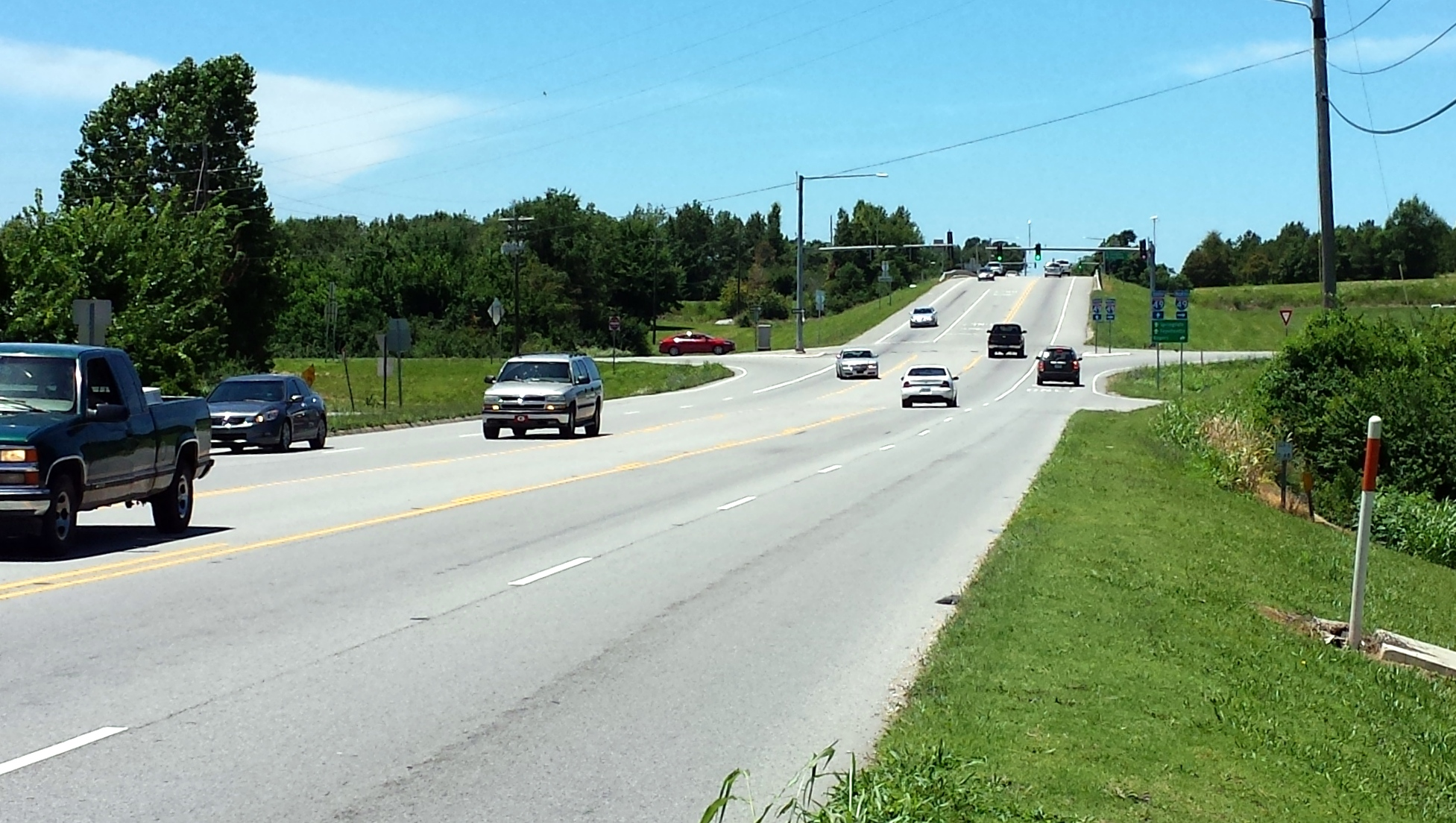
Highway 264 near the I-49 interchange

U.S. Route 71B passes through the center of Lowell as Bloomington Street and leads north 5 miles (8 km) to the center of Rogers and south 5 miles to the center of Springdale. Interstate 49 and U.S. Route 71 pass to the west of downtown Lowell, with access to the city at Exit 78 (Arkansas Highway 264). I-49 leads north 14 miles (23 km) to its end north of Bentonville and south 14 miles (23 km) to Fayetteville and 69 miles (111 km) to Fort Smith. Highway 264 is a main east–west road in Lowell, connecting I-49 and US 71B.

=== Utilities ===
Water and sewer service in Lowell is mostly provided by Springdale Water Utilities, with a small portion of northern Lowell receiving service from Rogers Water Utilities. Subdivisions in western Lowell operate on decentralized sewer systems due to a lack of available gravity sewer service.

Potable water for much of Northwest Arkansas is treated by Beaver Water District's water treatment plant, located in eastern Lowell near Beaver Lake. Wastewater is collected by gravity sewer and sent to a lift station near the Monroe Avenue exit on I-49. It is then pumped south, eventually being treated at the Springdale Wastewater Treatment Plant.

== Notable people ==
- Duncan Baird, District 96 state representative, securities trader in Lowell, candidate for state treasurer in 2014
- Ryan Foster, racing driver
