= Beaver Lake (Arkansas) =

Man-made reservoir in Arkansas, United States

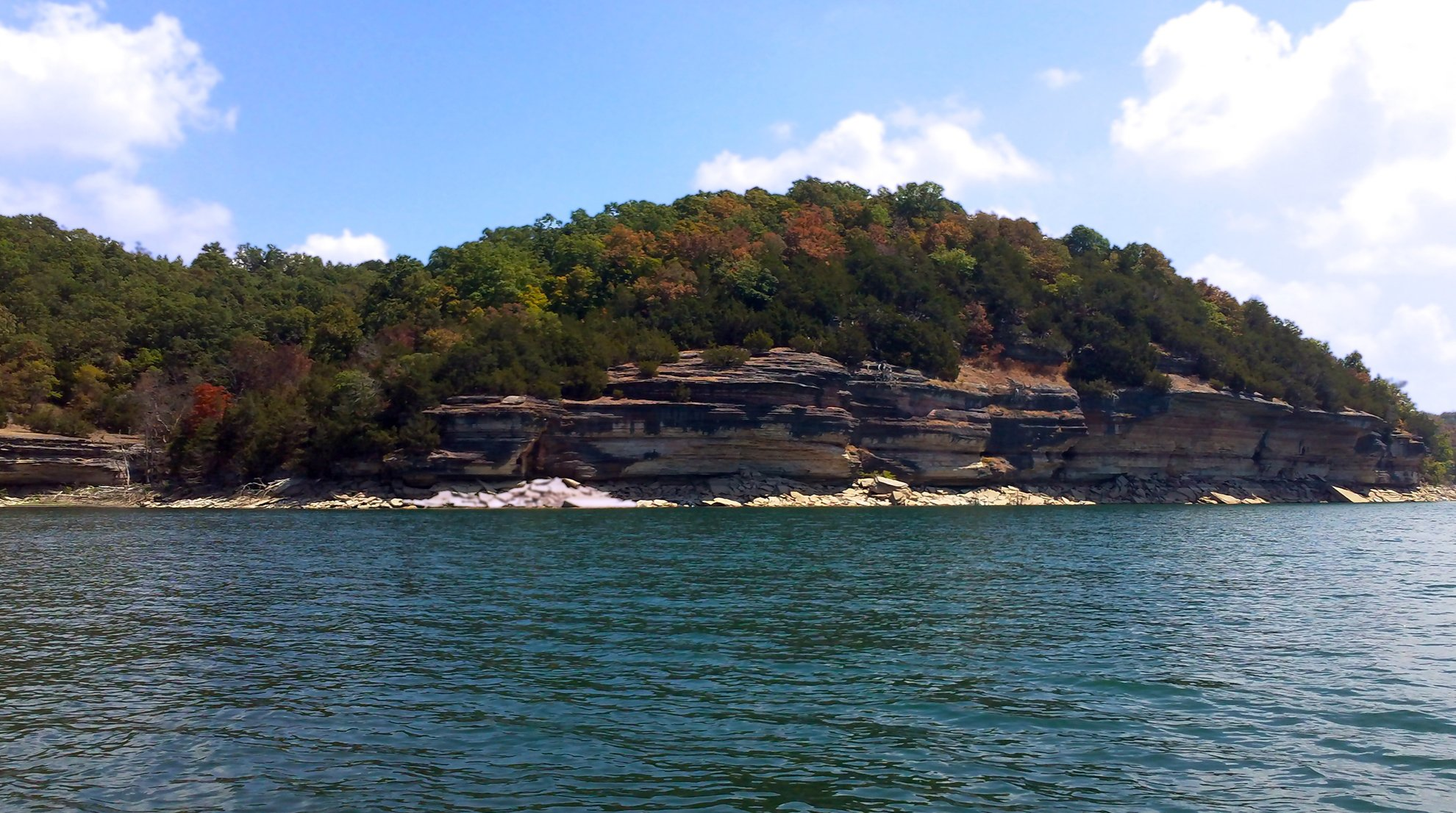

- Location within Arkansas Location within the United States
- Location: Ozark Mountains, Benton / Carroll / Washington County, Arkansas / United States
- Coordinates: 36°25′16.62″N 93°50′51.42″W
- Lake type: reservoir
- Primary outflows: White River
- Basin countries: United States
- Max. length: 50 mi (80 km)
- Surface area: 31,700 acres (12,800 ha)
- Shore length^{1}: 483 mi (777 km)
- Surface elevation: 1,120 ft (340 m)
- Settlements: Rogers, Arkansas; Eureka Springs, Arkansas
- ^{1} Shore length is not a well-defined measure.

Beaver Lake is a man-made reservoir in the Ozark Mountains of Northwest Arkansas formed by a dam across the White River. Beaver Lake has some 487 miles (784 km) of shoreline with towering limestone bluffs, natural caves, a variety of trees and flowering shrubs, making it a popular tourist destination. Beaver Lake is named after the town of Beaver near one of the original proposed dam sites who incidentally got its name from 1850s settlor Wilson Ashbury Beaver. Beaver Lake is also the source of drinking water in Northwest Arkansas, which is managed, treated and sold by Beaver Water District, serving more than 450,000 customers. 1 out of 7 people in Arkansas get their drinking water from Beaver Lake.

== Beaver Dam ==
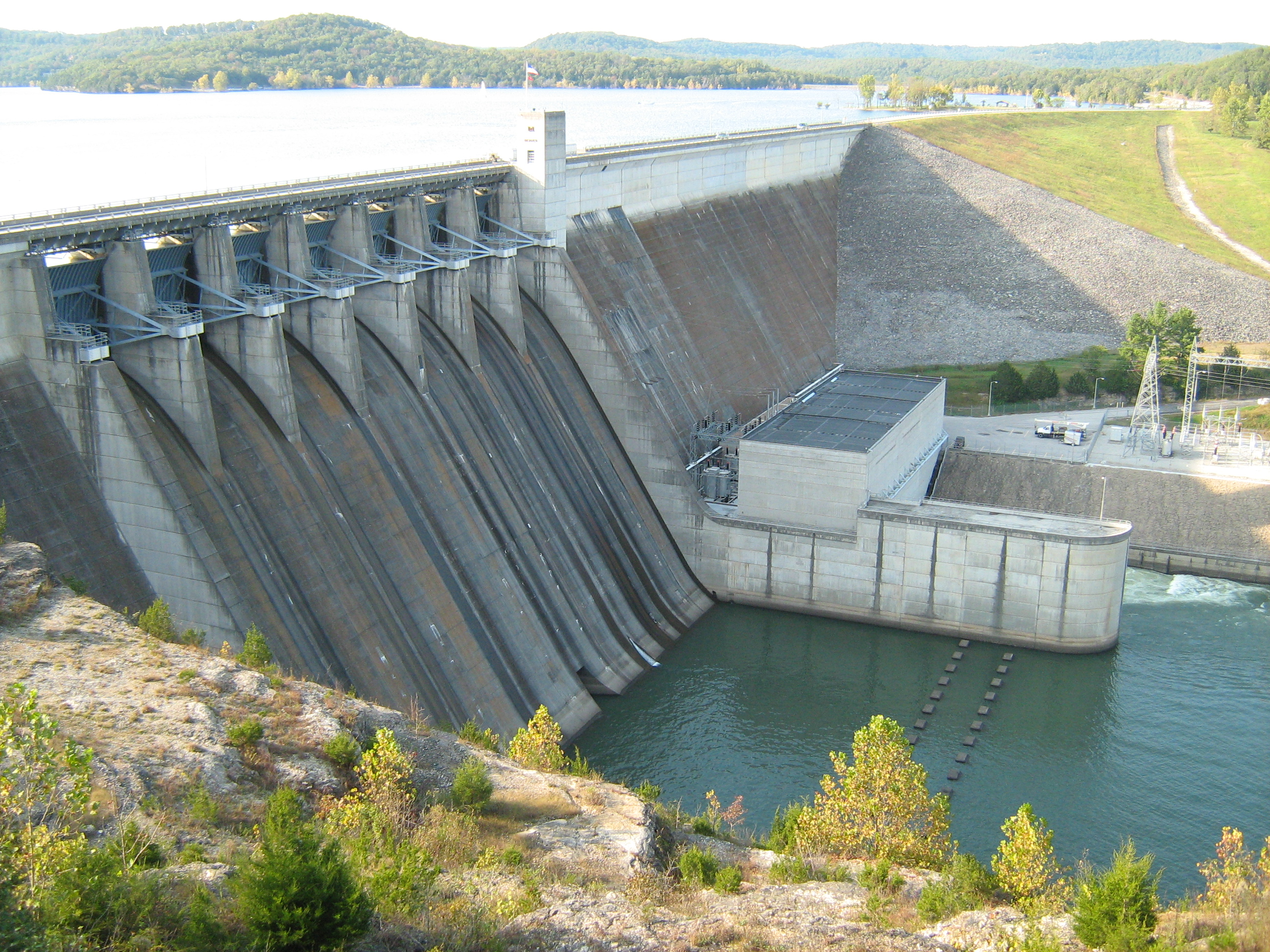
Beaver Dam and its spillway and powerhouse.

Beaver Dam was authorized by the Flood Control Act of 1944 and other following acts. The United States Army Corps of Engineers constructed Beaver Dam during the years 1960–1966, impounding a major part of the White River and creating Beaver Lake and flooding much of the valley including the remains of the historic resort town Monte Ne. The dam is located 9 miles (14 km) northwest of Eureka Springs, Arkansas. Construction of the powerhouse and switch yard began in 1963. Power generation began in May 1965 and continues today. The initial cost of the project was $60 million. The lake is approximately 50 miles (80 km) in length and covers approximately 31,700 acres (128 km^{2}), with about 483 miles (777 km) of shoreline and an elevation of 1,120 feet (341 m). This is also the first dam in the tailwater chain to provide cold water fishery along the White River.

== Recreation ==
The Army Corps of Engineers has also constructed a variety of recreational facilities around the lake. Paved access roads wind through twelve developed parks. These parks have modern campsites offering electricity and fire rings with drinking water, showers, and restrooms nearby. Other facilities, such as picnic sites, swimming beaches, hiking trails, boat launching ramps, and sanitary dump stations are also available in the parks. There are 12 recreation areas with 677 campsites along with 7 full-service commercial marina concessions, which hold 1,750 rental slips. There are 9 limited motel / resort leases and 28 boat ramps licensed to County or State. There are 8 national bass tournaments per year and many other fishing tournaments. There are 3.1 million visitors annually.

The Hobbs State Park-Conservation Area (formerly known as the Beaver Lake State Park) is the only State Park in Benton County, Arkansas.

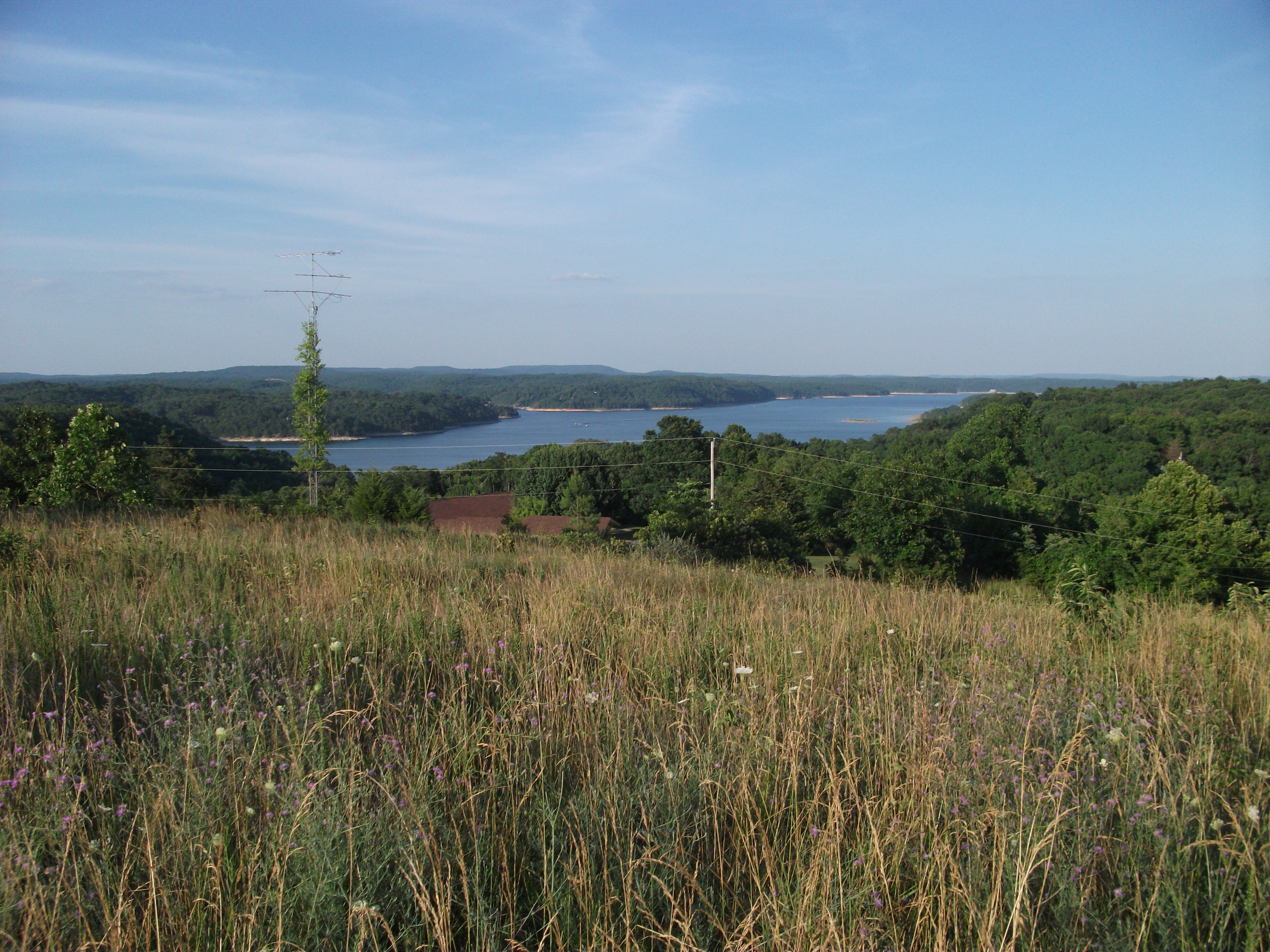
View of Beaver Lake as seen from Prairie Creek, Arkansas.

== Geography ==
The majority of Beaver Lake is located in Benton County. The dam itself is located in west Carroll County. Parts of the lake extend into Washington County and Madison County.

U.S. Route 62 runs along the north and west sides of Beaver Lake.

== Hydropower ==
The powerplant operates two main 56 MW turbines in one house unit. Total power generation capacity is 6,347,345 MWh. The revenue from power generation is returned to the US federal government to pay for the purchase price of the dam.hydropower

== Flood control ==
Beaver Lake is the first of several flood control lakes on the White river watershed. Beaver Lakes holds back flood water from Table Rock Lake. The estimated flood damages prevented in 2007 are $1.3 million. Since its creation, the Beaver Lake is estimated to have prevented $52.5 billion in damage.

== See also ==
- List of Arkansas dams and reservoirs
