= List of places in Arkansas: T =

Arkansas State Seal

This list of current cities, towns, unincorporated communities, and other recognized places in the U.S. state of Arkansas whose name begins with the letter T. It also includes information on the number and names of counties in which the place lies, and its lower and upper zip code bounds, if applicable.

== Cities and Towns ==
Name of place	Number of counties	Principal county	Lower zip code	Upper zip code
Tafton	1	Pulaski County	72183	
Tafton-Wrightsville	1	Pulaski County	72183	
Tag	1	Pope County		
Talley	1	Columbia County		
Tamo	1	Jefferson County	71644	
Tarry	1	Lincoln County	71667	
Tarsus	1	St. Francis County		
Tate	1	Logan County	72927	
Tates Bluff	1	Ouachita County		
Taylor	1	Columbia County	71861	
Tech	1	Pope County	72801	
Temperanceville	1	Howard County		
Temple	1	Little River County		
Tenark	1	Crittenden County		
Tennessee	1	Drew County	71655	
Terrytown	1	Pulaski County	72206	
Texarkana	1	Miller County	71854	
Texarkana Municipal Airport	1	Miller County	71854	
Thebes	1	Ashley County	71658	
The Pines	1	Scott County		
The Quarry	1	Independence County		
Thessing	1	Franklin County		
Thida	1	Independence County	72165	
Thiel	1	Grant County		
Thola	1	Searcy County		
Thomasville	1	Lee County		
Thompson	1	Crittenden County		
Thompson	1	Madison County		
Thornburg	1	Perry County	72126	
Thorney	1	Madison County	72727	
Thornton	1	Calhoun County	71766	
Three Brothers	1	Baxter County	72653	
Three Creeks	1	Union County	71749	
Three Forks	1	Crittenden County	72331	
Three Way	1	Craighead County		
Three Way	1	Mississippi County		
Tichnor	1	Arkansas County	72166	
Tide Water	1	Columbia County		
Tie Plant	1	Pulaski County		
Tillar	2	Desha County	71670	
Tillar	2	Drew County	71670	
Tilly	1	Pope County	72679	
Tilton	1	Cross County	72347	
Timbo	1	Stone County	72680	
Tinsman	1	Calhoun County	71767	
Tintop	1	Scott County		
Tip	1	Woodruff County		
Tipperary	1	Clay County		
Tisdale Ford	1	Washington County		
Toad Suck	1	Perry County		
Tobin	1	Pike County	71940	
Togo	1	Cross County	72373	
Tokalon	1	Logan County		
Tokio	1	Hempstead County	71852	
Toledo	1	Cleveland County	71665	
Tollette	1	Howard County	71851	
Tollville	1	Prairie County	72041	
Toltec	1	Lonoke County	72142	
Tolu	1	Washington County		
Tomahawk	1	Searcy County	72675	
Tomato	1	Mississippi County	72381	
Tomberlin	1	Lonoke County	72046	
Toney	1	Franklin County		
Toneyville	1	Pulaski County	72076	
Tongin	1	Lee County	72320	
Tontitown	1	Washington County	72770	
Topaz	1	Crittenden County	72346	
Trace	1	Clark County		
Trafalgar	1	Ashley County		
Trammellville	1	Clay County	72461	
Traskwood	1	Saline County	72167	
Treat	1	Pope County	72854	
Trenton	1	Phillips County	72374	
Trippe	1	Desha County	71654	
Trippe Junction	1	Desha County		
Troy	1	Ouachita County	71764	
Trumann	1	Poinsett County	72472	
Tuck	1	Craighead County	72401	
Tucker	1	Jefferson County	72168	
Tuckerman	1	Jackson County	72473	
Tuckertown	1	Mississippi County		
Tugwell	1	Phillips County		
Tukertown	1	Mississippi County	72321	
Tulip	1	Dallas County	71725	
Tull	1	Grant County	72015	
Tully	1	Poinsett County	72472	
Tulot	1	Poinsett County	72472	
Tumbling Shoals	1	Cleburne County	72581	
Tunis	1	Greene County		
Tupelo	1	Jackson County	72169	
Turkey	1	Marion County		
Turkey Creek	1	Stone County	72560	
Turkey Scratch	1	Phillips County		
Turner	1	Mississippi County		
Turner	1	Phillips County	72383	
Turrell	1	Crittenden County	72384	
Tuttle	1	Washington County	72727	
Twentythree	1	White County	72010	
Twin Creek	1	Izard County	72556	
Twin Groves	1	Faulkner County	72039	
Twin Lakes	1	Pulaski County		
Twin Springs	1	Pulaski County	72205	
Twist	1	Cross County	72385	
Tyro	1	Lincoln County	71662	
Tyronza	1	Poinsett County	72386	
Tyronza Junction	1	Poinsett County	72365	

== Townships ==
Name of place	Number of counties	Principal county	Lower zip code	Upper zip code
Talladega Township	1	Jefferson County		
Tappan Township	1	Phillips County		
Tate Township	1	Scott County		
Taylor Township	1	Columbia County		
Taylor Township	1	Craighead County		
Taylor Township	1	Nevada County		
Telico Township	1	St. Francis County		
Tennessee Township	1	Grant County		
Terre Noire Township	1	Clark County		
Texas Township	1	Craighead County		
Texas Township	1	Lee County		
Thacker Township	1	Lawrence County		
Thompson Township	1	Pike County		
Timbo Township	1	Stone County		
Titsworth Township	1	Logan County		
Tollette Township	1	Howard County		
Tomahawk Township	1	Searcy County		
Tomlinson Township	1	Logan County		
Tomlinson Township	1	Scott County		
Tontitown Township	1	Washington County		
Totten Township	1	Lonoke County		
Township 1	1	Benton County		
Township 1	1	Calhoun County		
Township 2	1	Benton County		
Township 2	1	Calhoun County		
Township 3	1	Benton County		
Township 3	1	Calhoun County		
Township 4	1	Benton County		
Township 4	1	Calhoun County		
Township 5	1	Benton County		
Township 5	1	Calhoun County		
Township 6	1	Benton County		
Township 6	1	Calhoun County		
Township 7	1	Benton County		
Township 7	1	Calhoun County		
Township 8	1	Benton County		
Township 8	1	Calhoun County		
Township 9	1	Benton County		
Township 9	1	Calhoun County		
Township 10	1	Benton County		
Township 11	1	Benton County		
Township 12	1	Benton County		
Township 13	1	Benton County		
Traskwood Township	1	Saline County		
Troy Township	1	Mississippi County		
Tubal Township	1	Union County		
Turkey Creek Township	1	Stone County		
Twist Township	1	Cross County		
Tyler Township	1	Perry County		
Tyler Township	1	Prairie County		
Tyronza Township	1	Crittenden County		
Tyronza Township	1	Cross County		
Tyronza Township	1	Poinsett County		
