= Township 1, Benton County, Arkansas =

Township 1
- Township
- Location in Arkansas
- Coordinates: 36°25′8″N 93°58′23″W
- Country: United States
- State: Arkansas
- County: Benton

Area
  - Total: 130.96 sq mi (339.2 km^{2})
  - Land: 116.21 sq mi (301.0 km^{2})
  - Water: 14.75 sq mi (38.2 km^{2}) 11.26%
- Elevation: 1,380 ft (420 m)

Population (2010)
  - Total: 13,223
  - Density: 113.8/sq mi (43.9/km^{2})
- Time zone: UTC-6 (CST)
  - Summer (DST): UTC-5 (CDT)
- Area code: 479
- GNIS feature ID: 1989186

Township 1 is one of thirteen townships in Benton County, Arkansas, USA.

== Cities, towns, villages ==
- Avoca (part)
- Garfield
- Gateway
- Lost Bridge Village
- Prairie Creek
- Rogers (part)

== Cemeteries ==
The township contains Alpine Cemetery, Bayless Cemetery, Clantonville Cemetery, Dean Cemetery, Ford Cemetery, Liberty Cemetery, McReynolds Cemetery, Ozark Cemetery, Pratt Cemetery, Scott Cemetery, Snoderley Cemetery, Walnut Hill Cemetery, and Williams Cemetery. Two former cemeteries also exist: Henson Cemetery and Williams Cemetery.

== Major routes ==
- US Route 62
- Arkansas Highway 12
- Arkansas Highway 37
- Arkansas Highway 127
