= Township 3 =

Township 3 may refer to:

- Buckhorn Township, Wake County, North Carolina
- Township 3, Benton County, Arkansas
- Township 3, Harper County, Kansas
- Township 3, Rooks County, Kansas
