= Township 9 =

Township 9 may refer to:

- Little River Township, Wake County, North Carolina
- Township 9, Benton County, Arkansas
- Township 9, Rooks County, Kansas
