= Township 12 =

Township 12 may refer to:

- Middle Creek Township, Wake County, North Carolina
- Township 12, Benton County, Arkansas
- Township 12, Rooks County, Kansas
