= Township 11 =

Township 11 may refer to:

- Meredith Township, Wake County, North Carolina
- Township 11, Benton County, Arkansas
- Township 11, Rooks County, Kansas
