= Township 4 =

Township 4 may refer to:

- Cary Township, Wake County, North Carolina
- Township 4, Benton County, Arkansas
- Township 4, Harper County, Kansas
- Township 4, Rooks County, Kansas
