= Osage Mills Dam =

- U.S. National Register of Historic Places
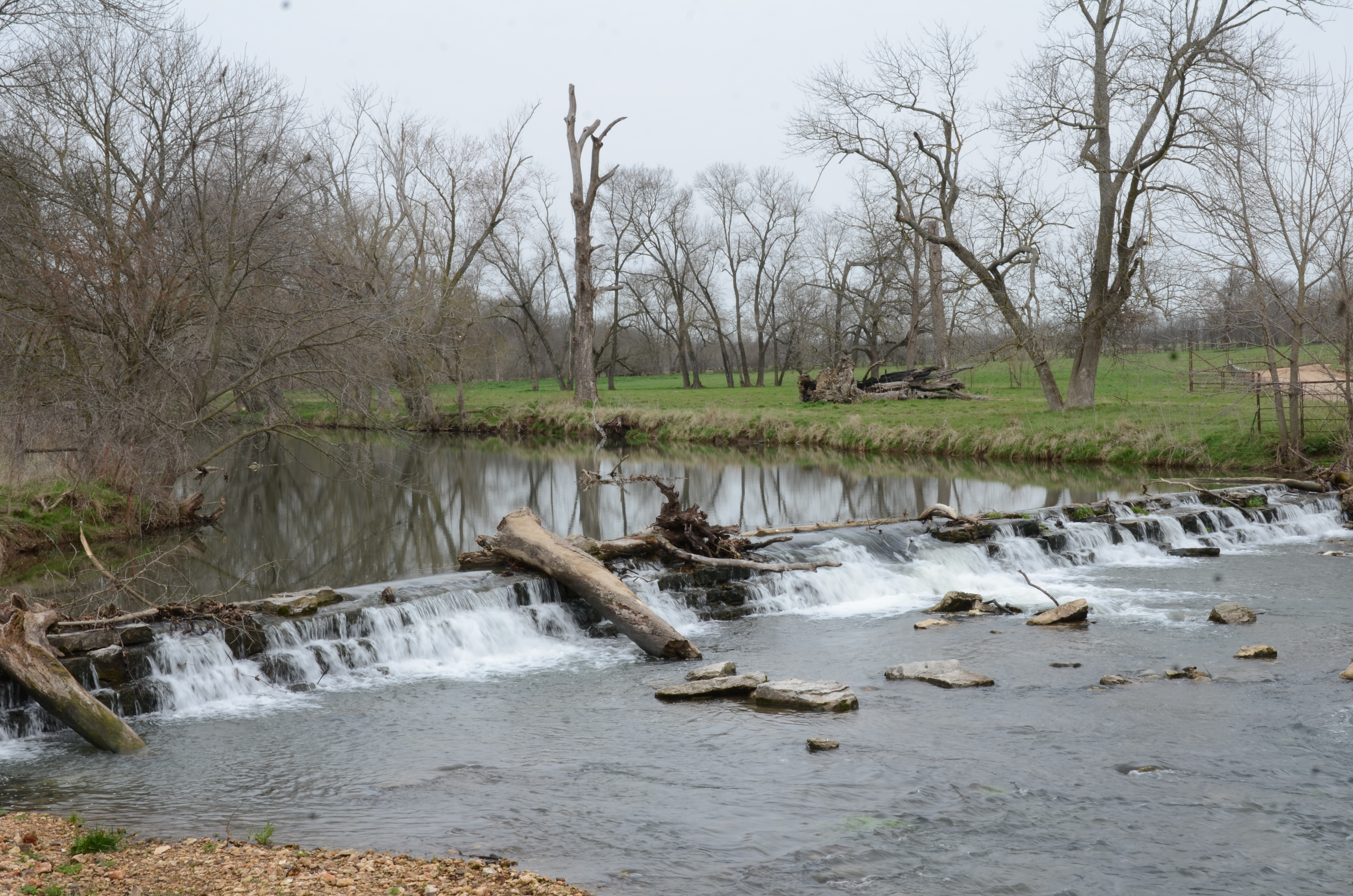

- Location within Arkansas Location within the United States
- Location: N of Osage Mills on Little Osage Creek, Osage Mills, Arkansas
- Coordinates: 36°17′40″N 94°16′3″W
- Area: less than one acre
- Built: 1890
- MPS: Benton County MRA
- NRHP reference No.: 87002376
- Added to NRHP: January 28, 1988

The Osage Mills Dam is a historic dam in rural Benton County, Arkansas. It impounds Little Osage Creek, just upstream of Mill Dam Road (County Road 47), between Rogers and the Northwest Arkansas National Airport. The dam was built c. 1890 out of coursed stone with a rusticated face. It was built to provide power to a grist mill that served the area, of which only a small portion of the millrace remains visible. The dam is the only known structure of its type in the county.

The dam was listed on the National Register of Historic Places in 1988.

== See also ==
- National Register of Historic Places listings in Benton County, Arkansas
