= El Dorado Springs =

El Dorado Springs or El Dorado Springs may refer to:

- Eldorado Springs, Arkansas
- Eldorado Springs, Colorado
- El Dorado Springs, Missouri
