= Turner, Arkansas =

Turner, Arkansas may be one of two unincorporated places in the US state of Arkansas.

- Turner, Mississippi County, Arkansas
- Turner, Phillips County, Arkansas
