= Township 7 =

Township 7 may refer to:

- House Creek Township, Wake County, North Carolina
- Township 7, Benton County, Arkansas
- Township 7, Rooks County, Kansas
- Township 7, Washington County, Nebraska
