= Township 13, Benton County, Arkansas =

Township 13
- Township
- Location in Arkansas
- Coordinates: 36°11′38″N 94°24′35″W
- Country: United States
- State: Arkansas
- County: Benton

Area
  - Total: 141.642 sq mi (366.85 km^{2})
  - Land: 140.548 sq mi (364.02 km^{2})
  - Water: 1.094 sq mi (2.83 km^{2})

Population (2010)
  - Total: 13,230
  - Density: 94.13/sq mi (36.34/km^{2})
- Time zone: UTC-6 (CST)
  - Summer (DST): UTC-5 (CDT)
- Area code: 479

Township 13 is one of thirteen current townships in Benton County, Arkansas, USA. As of the 2010 census, its total population was 13,230.

== Geography ==
According to the United States Census Bureau, Township 13 covers an area of 141.642 square miles (366.85 km^{2}); 140.548 square miles (364.02 km^{2}) of land and 1.094 square miles (2.83 km^{2}) of water.

=== Cities, towns, and villages ===
- Elm Springs (small parts of)
- Gentry (small parts of)
- Highfill (most of)
- Springdale (small parts of)
- Springtown
