= Township 6, Benton County, Arkansas =

Township 6
- Township
- Location in Arkansas
- Coordinates: 36°22′49″N 94°7′44″W
- Country: United States
- State: Arkansas
- County: Benton

Area
  - Total: 20.929 sq mi (54.21 km^{2})
  - Land: 20.908 sq mi (54.15 km^{2})
  - Water: 0.021 sq mi (0.054 km^{2})

Population (2010)
  - Total: 14,033
  - Density: 671.18/sq mi (259.14/km^{2})
- Time zone: UTC-6 (CST)
  - Summer (DST): UTC-5 (CDT)
- Area code: 479

Township 6 is one of thirteen current townships in Benton County, Arkansas, USA. As of the 2010 census, its total population was 14,033.

== Geography ==
According to the United States Census Bureau, Township 6 covers an area of 20.929 square miles (54.21 km^{2}); 20.908 square miles (54.15 km^{2}) of land and 0.021 square miles (0.054 km^{2}) of water.

=== Cities, towns, and villages ===
- Avoca (half of)
- Bentonville (small part)
- Little Flock (most of)
- Pea Ridge (small part)
- Rogers (small part)
