= Meredith Township =

Meredith Township may refer to the following townships in the United States:

- Meredith Township, Wake County, North Carolina
- Meredith Township, Cloud County, Kansas
