= Rife Farmstead =

Historic house in Arkansas, United States

- U.S. National Register of Historic Places
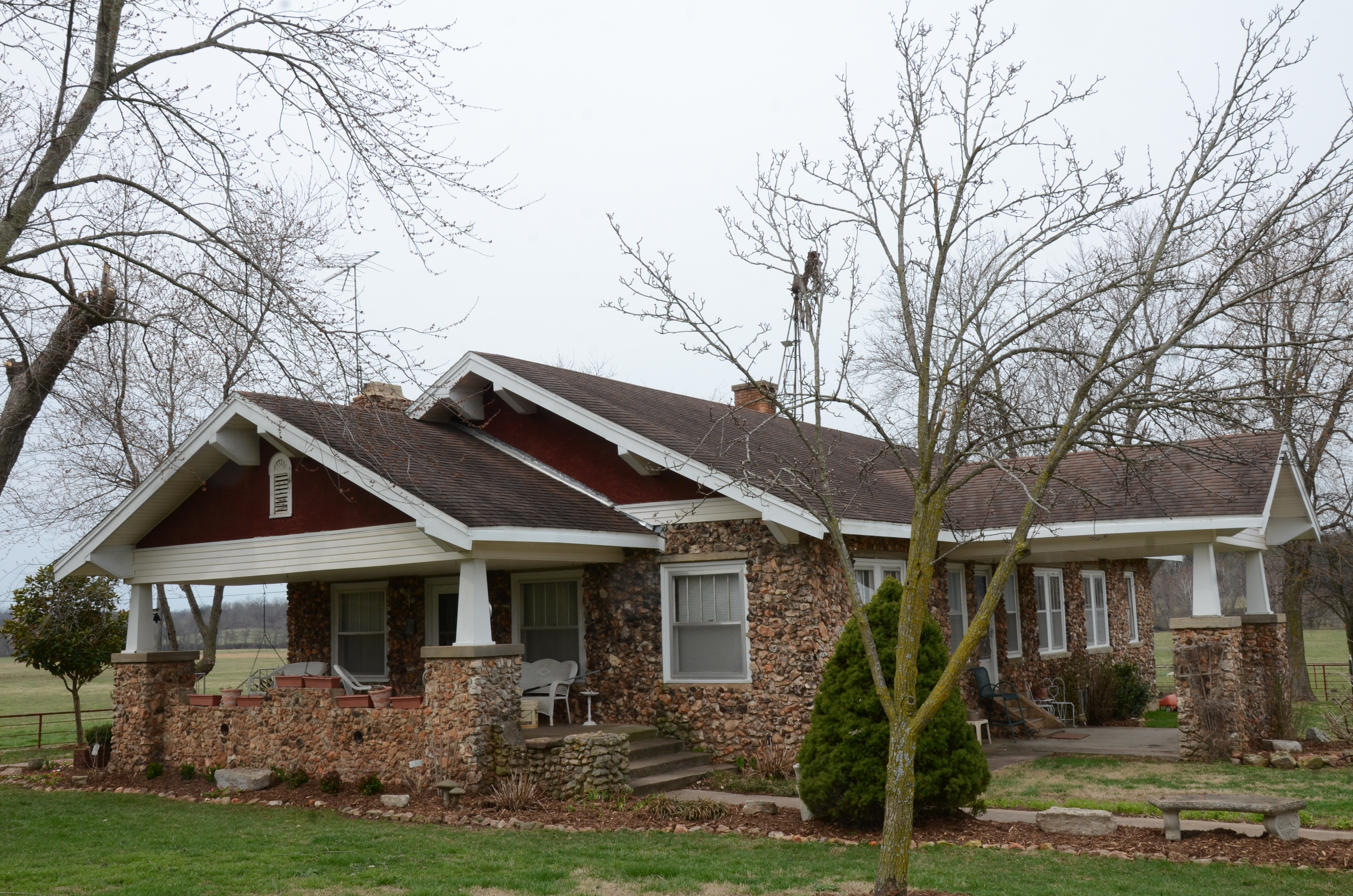

- Location within Arkansas Location within the United States
- Location: Osage Mills Rd., Osage Mills, Arkansas
- Coordinates: 36°16′10″N 94°15′57″W
- Area: 1.5 acres (0.61 ha)
- Built: 1910
- Built by: Luther Rife
- Architectural style: Bungalow/American Craftsman
- MPS: Benton County MRA
- NRHP reference No.: 87002380
- Added to NRHP: January 28, 1988

The Rife Farmstead is a historic farm property in rural Benton County, Arkansas. Located on the west side of County Road 47 about 1.25 miles (2.01 km) north of its junction with Arkansas Highway 264, it consists of a single-story Bungalow-style stone house with a front-gable roof, and a side gable projecting portico. The house was built in 1928 by Luther Rife, and is unusual in this rural setting, where most houses are vernacular in form. The property original had two c. 1910 barns when the property was surveyed in 1988; these are apparently no longer standing.

The property was listed on the National Register of Historic Places in 1988.

== See also ==
- National Register of Historic Places listings in Benton County, Arkansas
