= Township 4, Benton County, Arkansas =

Township 4
- Township
- Location in Arkansas
- Coordinates: 36°16′16″N 94°11′33″W
- Country: United States
- State: Arkansas
- County: Benton

Area
  - Total: 49.693 sq mi (128.70 km^{2})
  - Land: 49.346 sq mi (127.81 km^{2})
  - Water: 0.347 sq mi (0.90 km^{2})

Population (2010)
  - Total: 25,596
  - Density: 518.7/sq mi (200.3/km^{2})
- Time zone: UTC-6 (CST)
  - Summer (DST): UTC-5 (CDT)
- Area code: 479

Township 4 is one of thirteen current townships in Benton County, Arkansas, USA. As of the 2010 census, its total population was 25,596.

== Geography ==
According to the United States Census Bureau, Township 4 covers an area of 49.693 square miles (128.70 km^{2}); 49.346 square miles (127.81 km^{2}) of land and 0.347 square miles (0.90 km^{2}) of water.

=== Cities, towns, and villages ===
- Cave Springs
- Elm Springs (small parts)
- Lowell (part)
- Rogers (part)
- Springdale (part)
