= Lost Bridge Village, Arkansas =

- Census-designated place
- Location of Lost Bridge Village in Benton County, Arkansas.

- Location within Arkansas
- Coordinates: 36°23′18″N 93°54′25″W
- Country: United States
- State: Arkansas
- County: Benton

Area
  - Total: 3.23 sq mi (8.37 km^{2})
  - Land: 3.23 sq mi (8.37 km^{2})
  - Water: 0 sq mi (0.00 km^{2})
- Elevation: 1,230 ft (370 m)

Population (2020)
  - Total: 397
  - Density: 122.8/sq mi (47.43/km^{2})
- Time zone: UTC-6 (Central (CST))
  - Summer (DST): UTC-5 (CDT)
- Area code: 479
- GNIS feature ID: 58088

Lost Bridge Village is a residential subdivision near the town of Garfield in Benton County, Arkansas, United States. Per the 2020 census, the population was 397. It is located in the Northwest Arkansas region.

== Demographics ==
Historical population
Census	Pop.	Note	%±
2010	434		—
2020	397		−8.5%
U.S. Decennial Census; 2010 2020

=== 2020 census ===
Lost Bridge Village CDP, Arkansas – Racial and ethnic composition Note: the US Census treats Hispanic/Latino as an ethnic category. This table excludes Latinos from the racial categories and assigns them to a separate category. Hispanics/Latinos may be of any race.
Race / Ethnicity (NH = Non-Hispanic)	Pop 2010	Pop 2020	% 2010	% 2020
White alone (NH)	414	350	95.39%	88.16%
Black or African American alone (NH)	1	1	0.23%	0.25%
Native American or Alaska Native alone (NH)	11	7	2.53%	1.76%
Asian alone (NH)	1	0	0.23%	0.00%
Pacific Islander alone (NH)	2	0	0.46%	0.00%
Some Other Race alone (NH)	0	2	0.00%	0.50%
Mixed Race or Multi-Racial (NH)	1	27	0.23%	6.80%
Hispanic or Latino (any race)	4	10	0.92%	2.52%
Total	434	397	100.00%	100.00%

== Education ==
Public education for early childhood, elementary and secondary school students is provided by the Rogers School District.
