= Prairie Creek, Arkansas =

- CDP
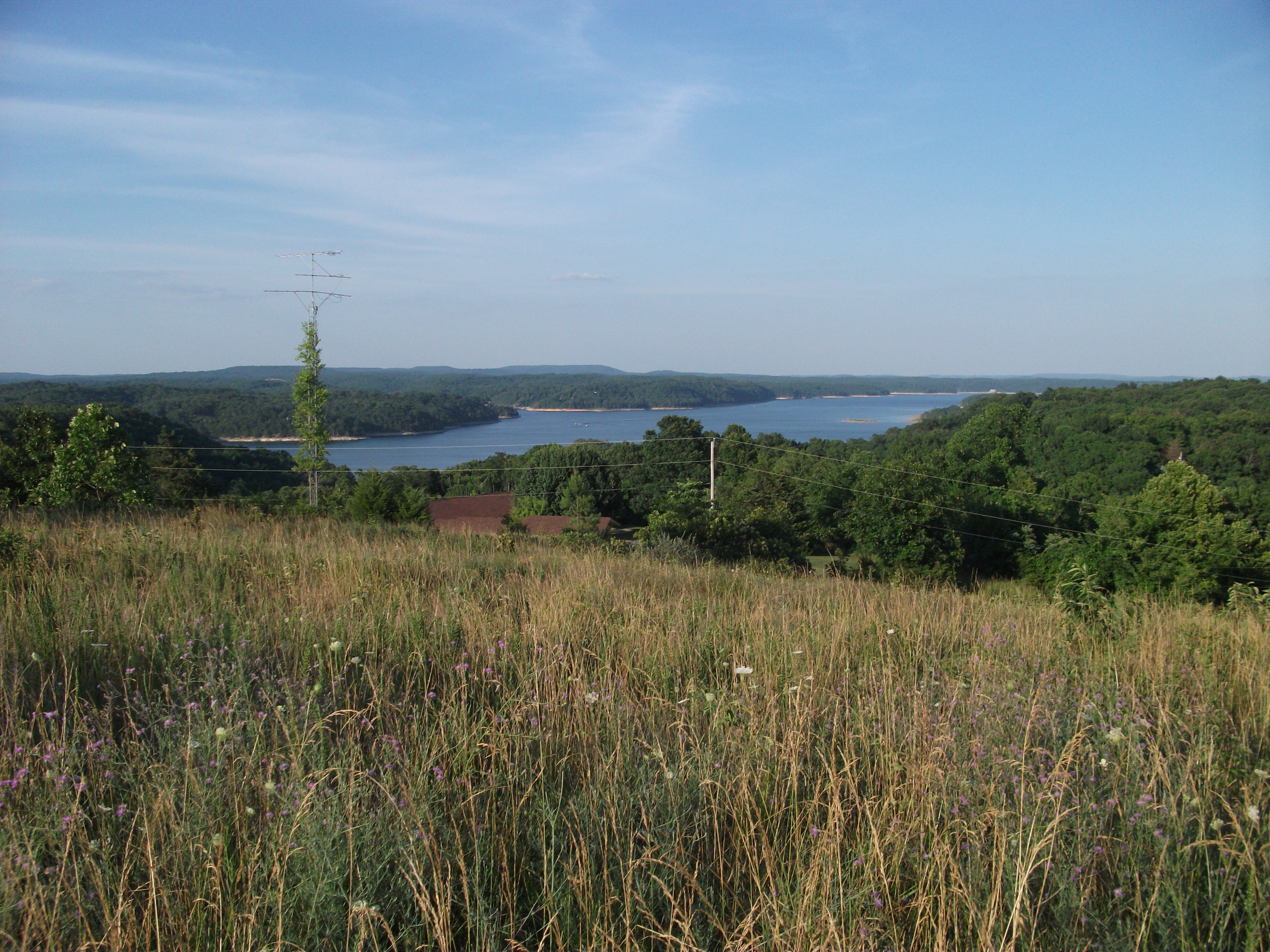
- View of Beaver Lake from Prairie Creek, Arkansas

- Location in Benton County and the state of Arkansas
- Coordinates: 36°20′27″N 94°3′42″W
- Country: United States
- State: Arkansas
- County: Benton

Area
  - Total: 4.86 sq mi (12.60 km^{2})
  - Land: 4.37 sq mi (11.32 km^{2})
  - Water: 0.49 sq mi (1.28 km^{2})
- Elevation: 1,404 ft (428 m)

Population (2020)
  - Total: 2,217
  - Density: 507.1/sq mi (195.81/km^{2})
- Time zone: UTC-6 (Central (CST))
  - Summer (DST): UTC-5 (CDT)
- ZIP code: 72756
- Area code: 479
- FIPS code: 05-57125
- GNIS feature ID: 0058424

Prairie Creek is a census-designated place (CDP) in Benton County, Arkansas, United States. Per the 2020 census, the population was 2,217. It is a lakefront community adjacent to Beaver Lake and Rogers within the Northwest Arkansas region.

== Geography ==
Prairie Creek is located at 36°20′27″N 94°3′42″W (36.340915, -94.061603).

According to the United States Census Bureau, the CDP has a total area of 4.4 square miles (11 km^{2}), all land.

== Demographics ==
Historical population
Census	Pop.	Note	%±
2000	1,849		—
2010	2,066		11.7%
2020	2,217		7.3%
U.S. Decennial Census; 2010 2020

=== Racial and ethnic composition ===
Prairie Creek CDP, Arkansas – Racial and ethnic composition Note: the US Census treats Hispanic/Latino as an ethnic category. This table excludes Latinos from the racial categories and assigns them to a separate category. Hispanics/Latinos may be of any race.
Race / Ethnicity (NH = Non-Hispanic)	Pop 2010	Pop 2020	% 2010	% 2020
White alone (NH)	1,932	1,889	93.51%	85.21%
Black or African American alone (NH)	10	6	0.48%	0.27%
Native American or Alaska Native alone (NH)	27	14	1.31%	0.63%
Asian alone (NH)	26	16	1.26%	0.72%
Pacific Islander alone (NH)	1	11	0.05%	0.50%
Some Other Race alone (NH)	2	6	0.10%	0.27%
Mixed Race or Multi-Racial (NH)	26	111	1.26%	5.01%
Hispanic or Latino (any race)	42	164	2.03%	7.40%
Total	2,066	2,217	100.00%	100.00%

=== 2020 census ===
As of the 2020 census, Prairie Creek had a population of 2,217. The median age was 48.9 years. 17.4% of residents were under the age of 18 and 23.4% of residents were 65 years of age or older. For every 100 females there were 90.8 males, and for every 100 females age 18 and over there were 93.8 males age 18 and over.

0.0% of residents lived in urban areas, while 100.0% lived in rural areas.

There were 908 households in Prairie Creek, of which 22.5% had children under the age of 18 living in them. Of all households, 68.1% were married-couple households, 10.5% were households with a male householder and no spouse or partner present, and 17.7% were households with a female householder and no spouse or partner present. About 17.1% of all households were made up of individuals and 7.5% had someone living alone who was 65 years of age or older.

There were 986 housing units, of which 7.9% were vacant. The homeowner vacancy rate was 0.5% and the rental vacancy rate was 7.0%.

=== 2000 census ===
As of the 2000 census, there were 1,849 people, 832 households, and 607 families residing in the CDP. The population density was 432.3 inhabitants per square mile (166.9/km^{2}). There were 914 housing units at an average density of 213.7 per square mile (82.5/km^{2}). The racial makeup of the CDP was 97.35% White, 0.16% Black or African American, 0.92% Native American, 0.22% Asian, 0.11% Pacific Islander, 0.22% from other races, and 1.03% from two or more races. 0.92% of the population were Hispanic or Latino of any race.

There were 832 households, out of which 18.4% had children under the age of 18 living with them, 67.2% were married couples living together, 3.1% had a female householder with no husband present, and 27.0% were non-families. 22.8% of all households were made up of individuals, and 10.3% had someone living alone who was 65 years of age or older. The average household size was 2.22 and the average family size was 2.59.

In the CDP, the population was spread out, with 17.1% under the age of 18, 3.5% from 18 to 24, 20.3% from 25 to 44, 32.2% from 45 to 64, and 26.9% who were 65 years of age or older. The median age was 51 years. For every 100 females, there were 94.6 males. For every 100 females age 18 and over, there were 92.1 males.

The median income for a household in the CDP was $59,000, and the median income for a family was $61,709. Males had a median income of $52,969 versus $30,852 for females. The per capita income for the CDP was $37,355. About 2.3% of families and 4.5% of the population were below the poverty line, including 8.1% of those under age 18 and 3.5% of those age 65 or over.

== Human resources ==
Public education for early childhood, elementary and secondary school students is provided by Rogers School District.

The primary law enforcement agency in Prairie Creek is the Benton County Sheriff's Office. The Prairie Creek Substation opened on Highway 12 in 2017.

== Culture ==
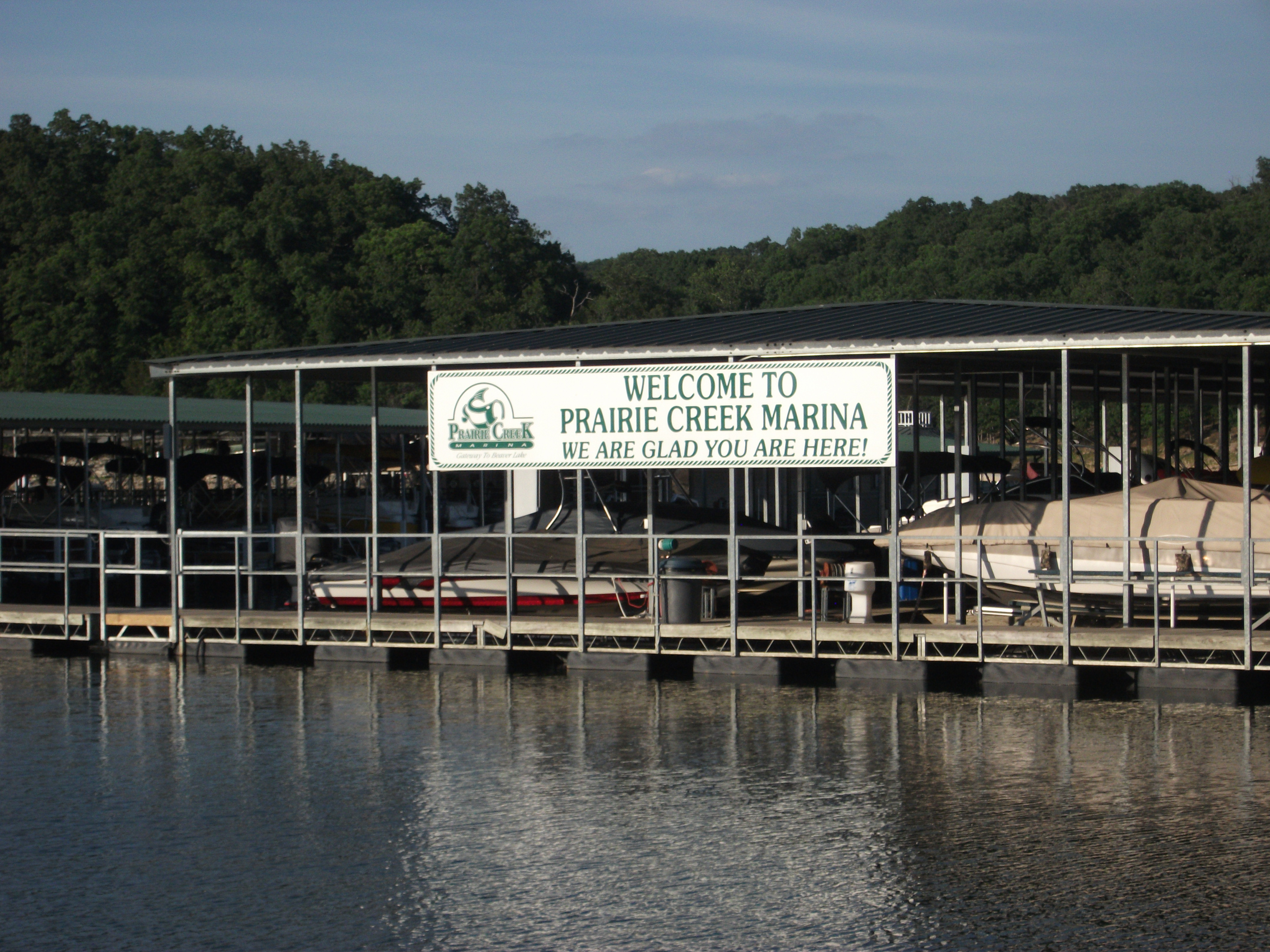
Prairie Creek Marina, Prairie Creek Park on Beaver Lake. Prairie Creek, Arkansas.

The community is home to the Prairie Creek Marina on Beaver Lake. The marina has over 500 boat slips.

== Education ==
It is in the Rogers Public Schools school district.
