= Township 10, Benton County, Arkansas =

Township 10
- Township
- Location in Arkansas
- Coordinates: 36°27′13″N 94°18′29″W
- Country: United States
- State: Arkansas
- County: Benton

Area
  - Total: 43.848 sq mi (113.57 km^{2})
  - Land: 42.522 sq mi (110.13 km^{2})
  - Water: 1.326 sq mi (3.43 km^{2})

Population (2010)
  - Total: 16,402
  - Density: 385.73/sq mi (148.93/km^{2})
- Time zone: UTC-6 (CST)
  - Summer (DST): UTC-5 (CDT)
- Area code: 479

Township 10 is one of thirteen current townships in Benton County, Arkansas, USA. As of the 2010 census, its total population was 16,402.

== Geography ==
According to the United States Census Bureau, Township 10 covers an area of 43.848 square miles (113.57 km^{2}); 42.522 square miles (110.13 km^{2}) of land and 1.326 square miles (3.43 km^{2}) of water.

=== Cities, towns, and villages ===
- Bella Vista (most of)
- Hiwasse (most of)
