= Township 2, Benton County, Arkansas =

Township 2
- Township
- Location in Arkansas
- Coordinates: 36°15′50″N 93°58′59″W
- Country: United States
- State: Arkansas
- County: Benton

Area
  - Total: 111.844 sq mi (289.67 km^{2})
  - Land: 94.984 sq mi (246.01 km^{2})
  - Water: 16.860 sq mi (43.67 km^{2})

Population (2010)
  - Total: 14,279
  - Density: 150.33/sq mi (58.04/km^{2})
- Time zone: UTC-6 (CST)
  - Summer (DST): UTC-5 (CDT)
- Area code: 479

Township 2 is one of thirteen current townships in Benton County, Arkansas, USA. As of the 2010 census, its total population was 14,279.

== Geography ==
According to the United States Census Bureau, Township 2 covers an area of 111.844 square miles (289.67 km^{2}); 94.984 square miles (246.01 km^{2}) of land and 16.860 square miles (43.67 km^{2}) of water.

=== Cities, towns, and villages ===
- Lowell (small part)
- Rogers (small part)
- Springdale (small part)
