= Township 5, Benton County, Arkansas =

Township 5
- Township
- Location in Arkansas
- Coordinates: 36°20′9″N 94°8′26″W
- Country: United States
- State: Arkansas
- County: Benton

Area
  - Total: 4.460 sq mi (11.55 km^{2})
  - Land: 4.452 sq mi (11.53 km^{2})
  - Water: 0.008 sq mi (0.021 km^{2})

Population (2010)
  - Total: 12,792
  - Density: 2,873.32/sq mi (1,109.40/km^{2})
- Time zone: UTC-6 (CST)
  - Summer (DST): UTC-5 (CDT)
- Area code: 479

Township 5 is one of thirteen current townships in Benton County, Arkansas, USA. As of the 2010 census, its total population was 12,792.

== Geography ==
According to the United States Census Bureau, Township 5 covers an area of 4.460 square miles (11.55 km^{2}); 4.452 square miles (11.53 km^{2}) of land and 0.008 square miles (0.021 km^{2}) of water.

=== Cities, towns, and villages ===
- Rogers (part)
