= Osage Mills, Arkansas =

Unincorporated community in Arkansas, US

Coordinates: 36°16′52″N 94°16′08″W

Osage Mills is an unincorporated community in Benton County, Arkansas, United States. The millsite and associated dam is located on Little Osage Creek about eight miles southwest of Rogers. It is the location of (or is the nearest community to) the following places listed on the National Register of Historic Places on January 28, 1988:

Council Grove Methodist Church, Osage Mills Rd.
Osage Mills Dam, N of Osage Mills on Little Osage Creek
Piercy Farmstead, Osage Mills Rd.
Rife Farmstead, Osage Mills Rd.
