= Township 8, Benton County, Arkansas =

Township 8
- Township
- Location in Arkansas
- Coordinates: 36°22′49″N 94°12′2″W
- Country: United States
- State: Arkansas
- County: Benton

Area
  - Total: 8.028 sq mi (20.79 km^{2})
  - Land: 8.020 sq mi (20.77 km^{2})
  - Water: 0.008 sq mi (0.021 km^{2})

Population (2010)
  - Total: 12,637
  - Density: 1,575.69/sq mi (608.38/km^{2})
- Time zone: UTC-6 (CST)
  - Summer (DST): UTC-5 (CDT)
- Area code: 479

Township 8 is one of thirteen current townships in Benton County, Arkansas, USA. As of the 2010 census, its total population was 12,637.

== Geography ==
According to the United States Census Bureau, Township 8 covers an area of 8.028 square miles (20.79 km^{2}); 8.020 square miles (20.77 km^{2}) of land and 0.008 square miles (0.021 km^{2}) of water.

=== Cities, towns, and villages ===
- Bentonville (part)
