= Logan Cave National Wildlife Refuge =

Wildlife refuge in Arkansas

- IUCN category IV (habitat/species management area)
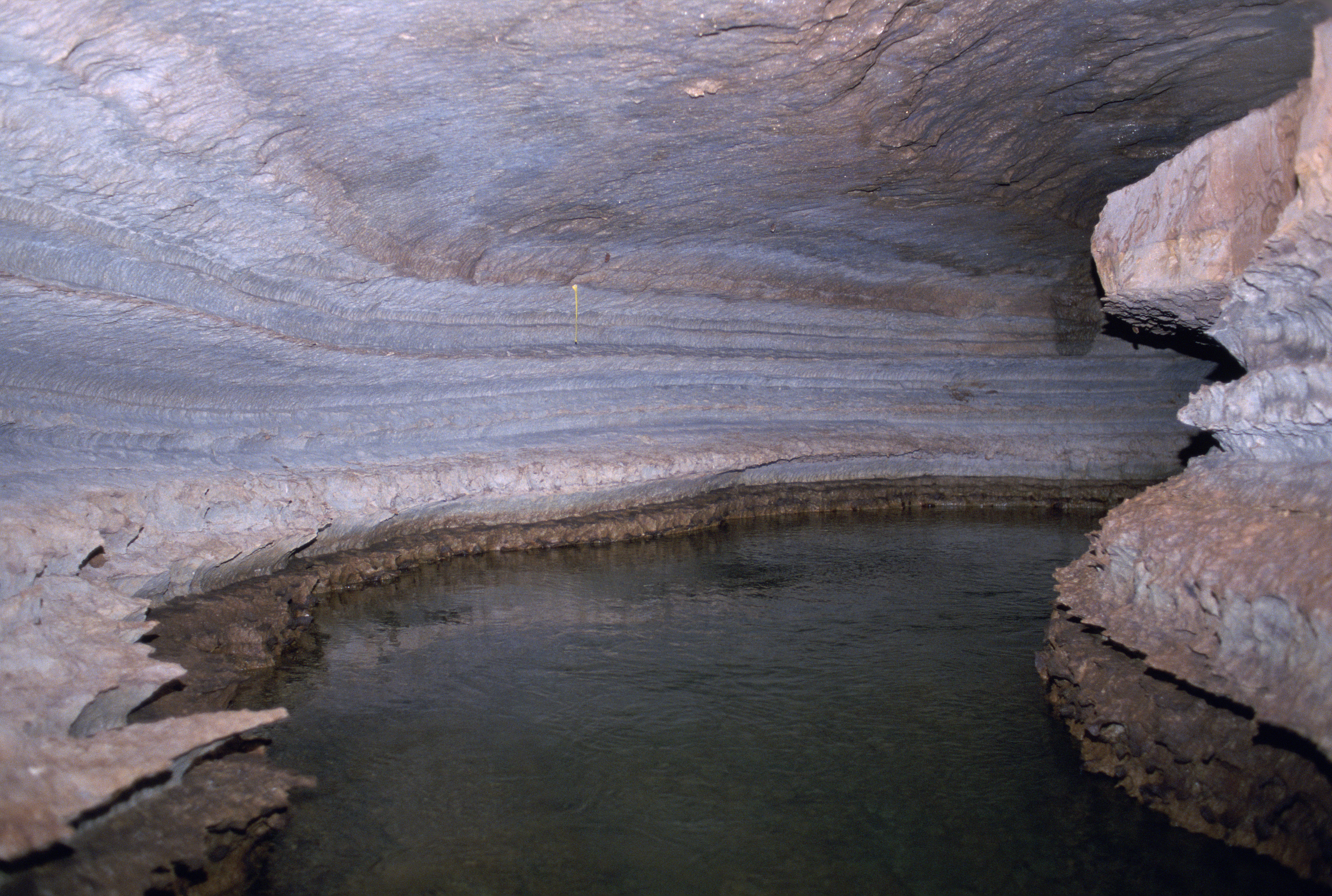
- Cave Habitat

- Location within the United States
- Location: Benton County, Arkansas, United States
- Nearest city: Siloam Springs, Arkansas
- Coordinates: 36°11′52″N 94°23′43″W
- Area: 123 acres (0.50 km^{2})
- Established: 1989
- Governing body: U.S. Fish and Wildlife Service
- Website: Logan Cave National Wildlife Refuge

Logan Cave National Wildlife Refuge in Benton County, Arkansas became the 455th National Wildlife Refuge on March 14, 1989, under the Endangered Species Act of 1973. This 123-acre (0.50 km^{2}) Ozark Mountain refuge, which includes a limestone-solution cave, is located 20 miles (32 km) west of Fayetteville, Arkansas and approximately 2 miles (3.2 km) north of U.S. Route 412.

The Logan Cave area has a very diverse habitat which includes representatives of several Ozark Mountain types: oak-hickory forest, grassland, shrubland, floodplain, marshland, bottomland hardwood, upland deciduous, and a small prairie. The ecology of the cave has been described as the highest quality cave habitat in the entire Ozark region. A spring-fed stream, with an average water flow of 5 million gallons/day, extends the entire length of the cave. This stream, fed by small springs that emanate from the cave, once supplied water to the Logan community, a fish hatchery and 49 fish ponds. Today, the spring forms a small stream which flows into the Osage Creek, a major tributary of the Illinois River. Geological features of the cave distinctly exhibit how Ozark limestone-solution caves are formed. Many fossil marine species are present in the cave, evidence that the region was once covered by an ocean. Extensive deposits of fine alluvial clays of homogeneous texture border the stream in some areas.

The primary objectives of Logan Cave NWR are to properly administer, preserve, and develop the tract for protection of a unique cave ecosystem that provides essential habitat for the endangered gray bat, endangered Benton cave crayfish, the threatened Ozark cavefish, and other significant cave dwelling wildlife species. Gray bats use the cave in the spring and summer as a maternity site and the Ozark cave crayfish is known only to exist in Logan Cave and one other site.
