= Council Grove Methodist Church =

Historic church in Arkansas, United States

- U.S. National Register of Historic Places
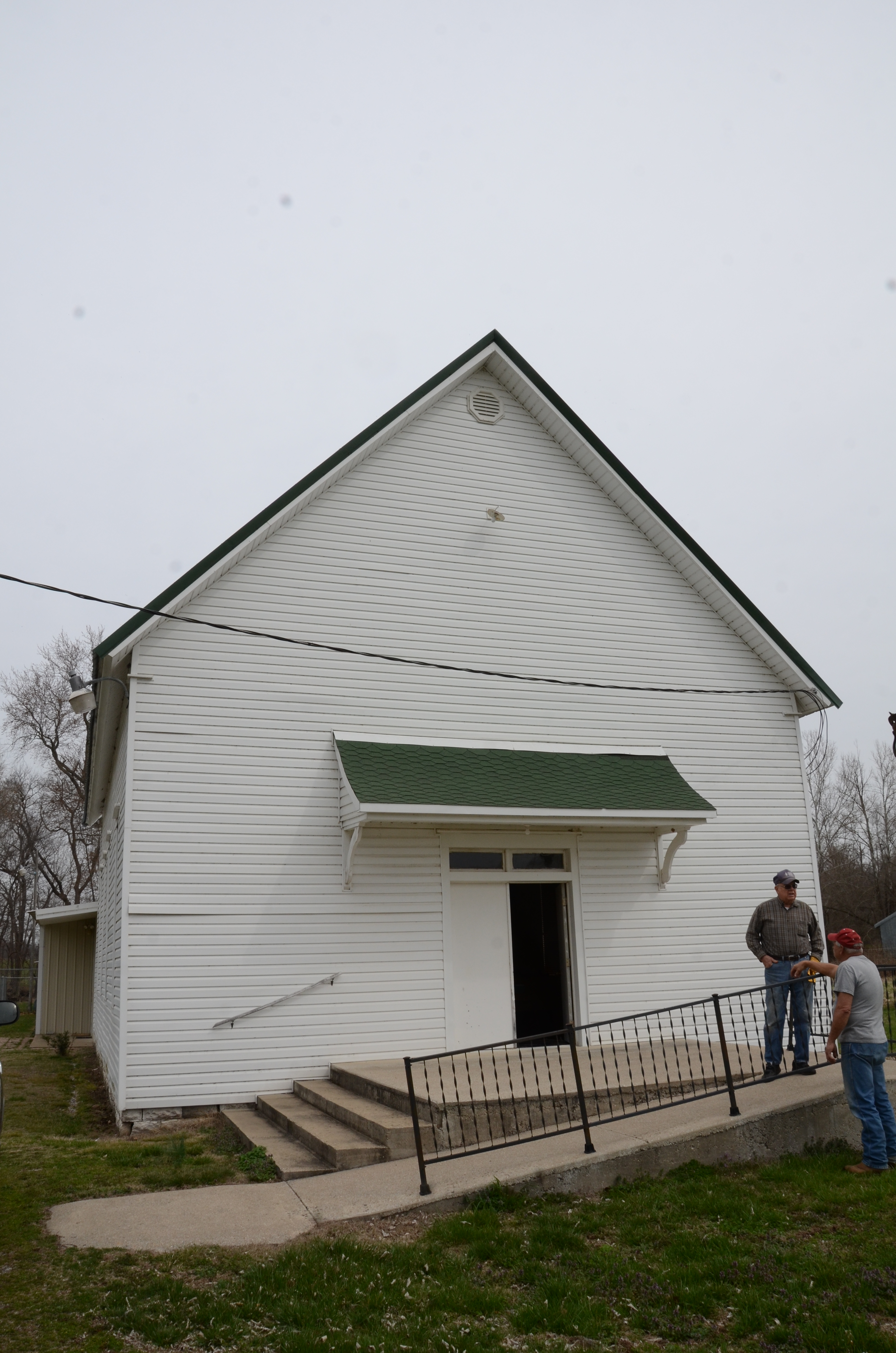

- Location within Arkansas Location within the United States
- Location: Osage Mills Rd., Osage Mills, Arkansas
- Coordinates: 36°16′53″N 94°16′5″W
- Area: less than one acre
- Built: 1890
- MPS: Benton County MRA
- NRHP reference No.: 87002377
- Added to NRHP: January 28, 1988

The Council Grove Methodist Church is a historic church on Osage Mills Road in Osage Mills, Arkansas. It is a small single-story wood-frame structure with a steeply pitched gable roof. Its cornerboards have plain capitals, and its main entrance is sheltered by a shed-roof hood supported by brackets. Built c. 1890, it is a fine local example of vernacular rural church architecture.

The church was listed on the National Register of Historic Places in 1988.

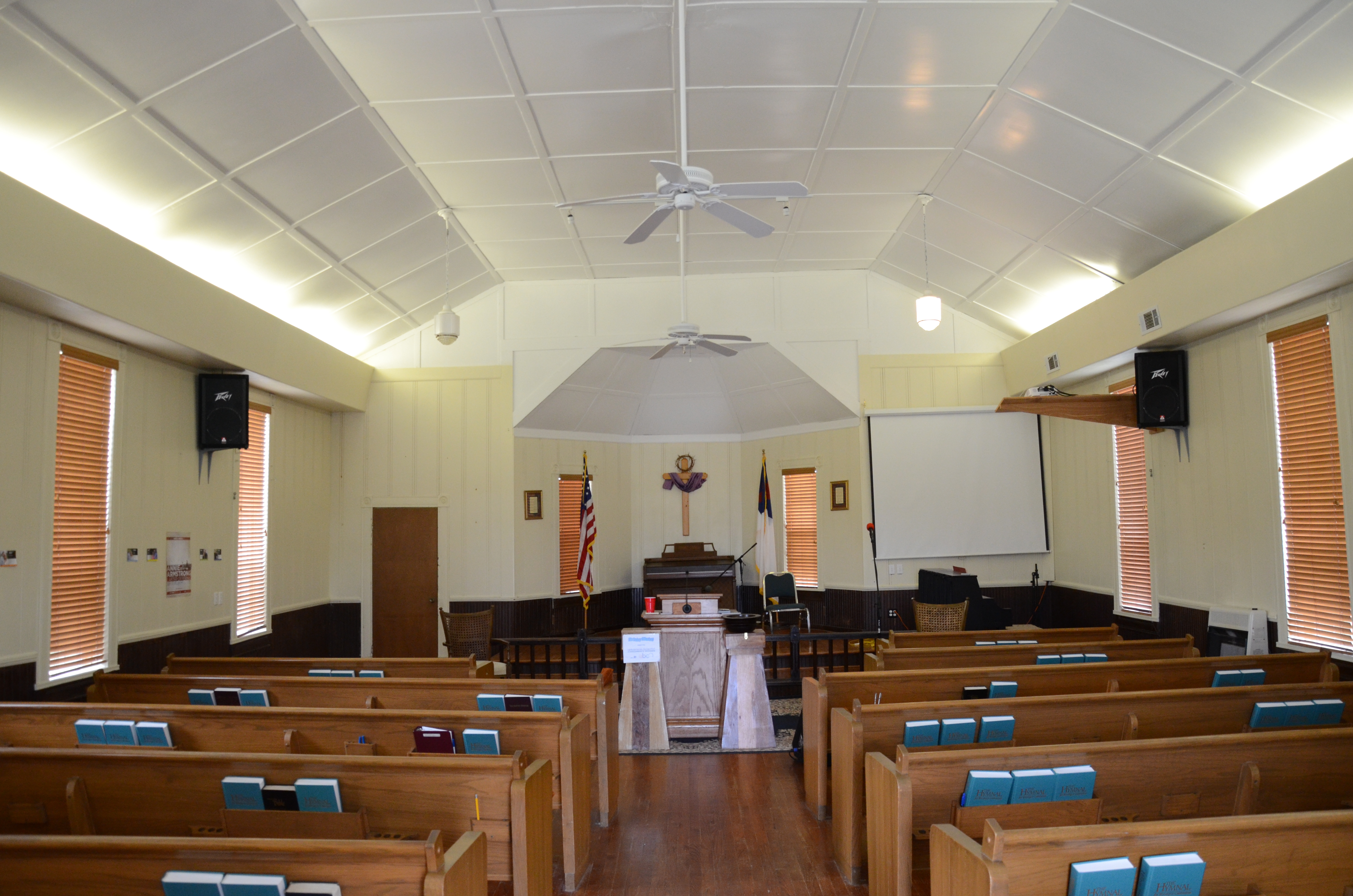
Interior of the church

== See also ==
- National Register of Historic Places listings in Benton County, Arkansas
