= Piercy Farmstead =

- Formerly listed on the U.S. National Register of Historic Places
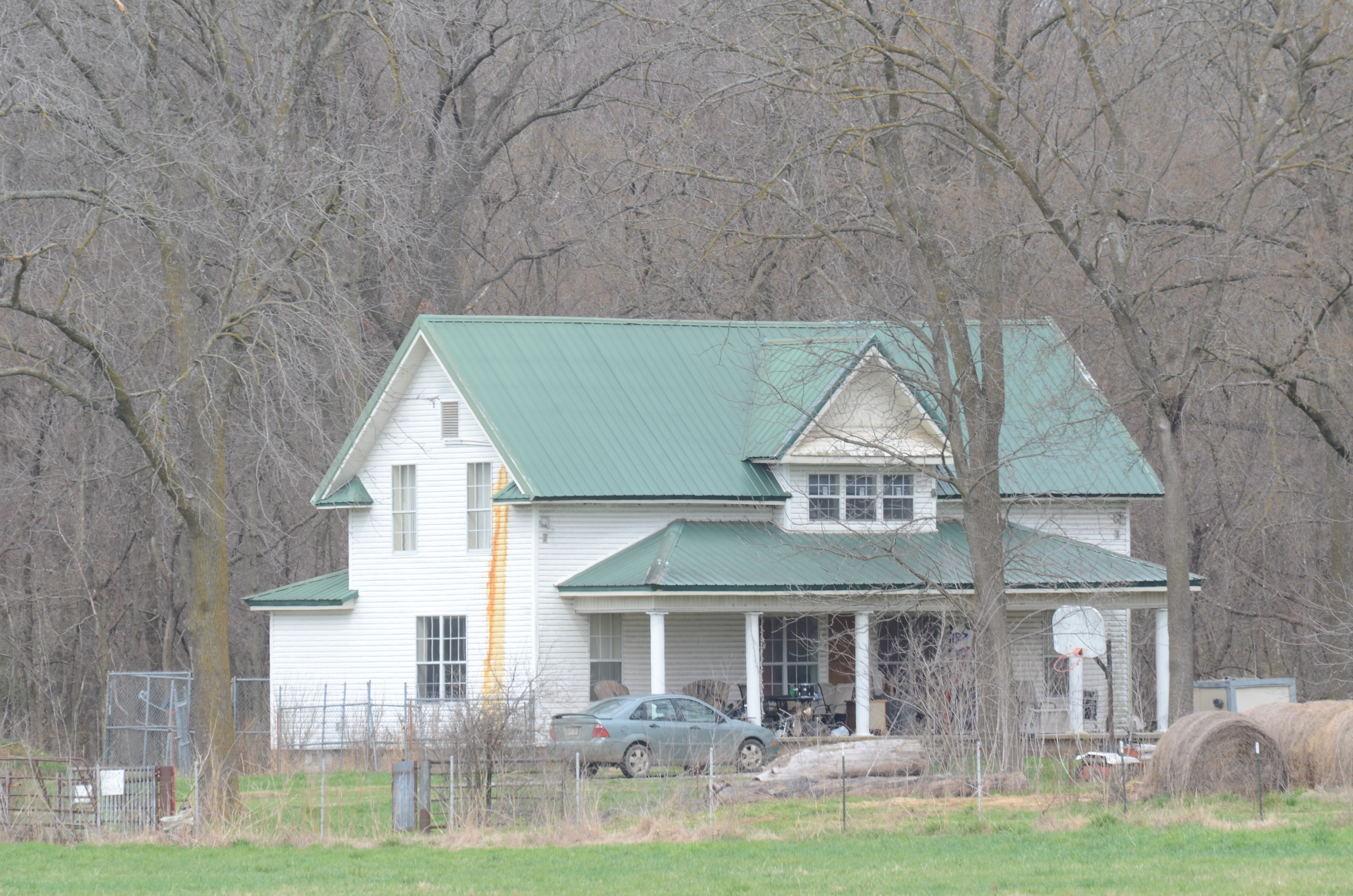

- Location within Arkansas Location within the United States
- Location: Osage Mills Rd., Osage Mills, Arkansas
- Coordinates: 36°16′25″N 94°16′1″W
- Area: 3.5 acres (1.4 ha)
- Built: 1909
- MPS: Benton County MRA
- NRHP reference No.: 87002379

Significant dates
- Added to NRHP: January 28, 1988
- Removed from NRHP: October 14, 2026

The Piercy Farmstead is a historic farm complex on Osage Mills Road in Osage Mills, Arkansas. It includes a c. 1909 vernacular Colonial Revival farmhouse, and is unusual for the collection of ten surviving agricultural outbuildings, including storage buildings, chicken houses, a barn, privy, grain crib, and well house. The house is a two-story wood-frame structure, with a rear extension giving it a T shape. A single-story porch with simple classical columns extends across the symmetrical front.

The property was listed on the National Register of Historic Places in 1988.

== See also ==
- National Register of Historic Places listings in Benton County, Arkansas
