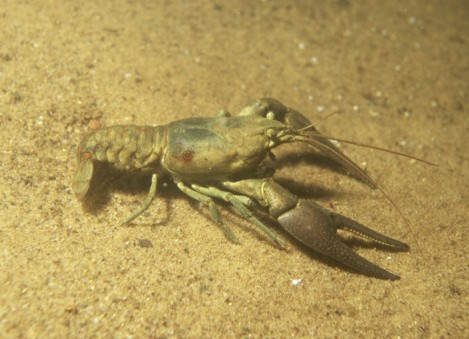

Conservation status
- Critically Endangered (IUCN 3.1)

- Endangered (ESA)

Scientific classification
- Kingdom: Animalia
- Phylum: Arthropoda
- Clade: Pancrustacea
- Class: Malacostraca
- Order: Decapoda
- Suborder: Pleocyemata
- Family: Cambaridae
- Genus: Cambarus
- Species: C. aculabrum

Binomial name
- Cambarus aculabrum Hobbs & Brown, 1987

= Cambarus aculabrum =

Species of crayfish

Cambarus aculabrum is a rare species of cave-dwelling crayfish known by the common name Benton county cave crayfish. It is native to Arkansas in the United States, where it is known from only four locations. It is a federally listed endangered species of the United States.

== Taxonomy and naming ==
This crayfish was first described to science as a new species in 1987. There has been little formal study of this species due to its rarity.

It has been postulated that the four subterranean crayfish species inhabiting the Ozarks, including Cambarus aculabrum, derive from a common epigean ancestor species that gained access to a historic cave channel in the Ozark Plateau.

== Description ==
It is about 48 millimeters (1.8 inches) long. As a stygobite it is adapted to groundwater environments; it lacks pigment, making it white in color, and has only rudimentary eyes. The body and claws bear numerous stiff hairs, while the rostrum is crested with small spines.

== Distribution and habitat ==
The crayfish has been found living in three limestone solutional caves in the karst landscape of northern Arkansas; Bear Hollow Cave, Logan Cave and Old Pendergrass Cave in Benton County. Additionally, one specimen was found in a pool in Brush Creek in Washington County, having been flushed from the hyporheic zone by flooding. It is not considered an Arkansas endemic species because 58% of one of the Bear Hollow cave recharge zones lies within the neighboring state of Missouri, although it has not yet been found in that state.

It can be found in all pool and stream habitats within the caves, but is commonly found along the edge of the water. Cave entrances are avoided due to the risk of predation by surface species. Clean, clear and well oxygenated water is required. Water temperatures in the cave generally remain stable at around 57 °F. Because of the rapid recharge rates of the cave systems, stream velocity and volume can increase dramatically. During these floods events crayfish can be washed out of the cave systems, exposing them to predation. Several individuals have been found in surface waters downstream of the caves. Because the species is adapted to subterranean environments, it is assumed that it cannot survive outside of the caves.

Additional populations of stygobitic crayfish have been identified near the four known locations. Stygobitic crayfish have been observed in Rootville Cave and in a cistern on Spanker Creek in Benton County. They were identified as belonging to the genus Cambarus, but a species determination was not made. The crayfish in the Spanker Creek cistern were killed by the landowner in order to avoid regulation under the Endangered Species Act of 1973 before they could be identified.

== Diet and feeding ==
Nutrient levels in the cave water are low, and because of this crayfish feeds on detritus washed into the cave from the surface, and on algae, fungus, and other organisms associated with deposits of bat guano.

== Natural history ==
Like other stygobitic crayfish species, the Benton county cave crayfish has an increased lifespan (up to 75 years) and low reproductive and metabolic rates. Little else is known about its ecology.

It has been eaten by the banded sculpin (Cottus carolinae) on at least one occasion.

== Conservation status ==
As of 2006, the estimated total population of Benton county cave crayfish was less than 200 individuals. Due to its rarity and extremely restricted range, it was listed as endangered by the United States Fish and Wildlife Service (USFWS) in 1993 and by the IUCN in 2004. A recovery plan was created by the USFWS in 1996.

A number of threats to the survival of this species have been identified. Habitat degradation due to groundwater pollution from residential septic systems and concentrated animal feeding operations has been identified as the main threat. Additional threats include trampling by trespassers and explorers in the caves, low reproductive rate, specimen collection, predation, and flooding.

A number of measures have been taken to reduce threats to this species. Gates have been erected at the entrance of Bear Hollow and Logan caves to prevent trampling, but due to vandalism this threat remains. A fixed rope line was installed on the wall of Bear Hollow Cave to prevent trampling during official population counts. Additionally, scientific collection of specimens has ceased, with none taking place since the 1980s. Severe penalties under the ESA discourage amateur collection. The primary conservation measure taken to protect this species has been land acquisition and protection. The 46.9 hectare Logan Cave National Wildlife Refuge was created by the USFWS around the entrances to Logan Cave. The Bear Hollow Natural Area and Camden Hollow Natural Area containing the entrances to Bear Hollow Cave and Old Pendergrass cave, respectively, were established by The Nature Conservancy. The Nature Conservancy has also established efforts to upgrade septic systems and reforest areas within the cave recharge zones.
