= The Pines, Arkansas =

Unincorporated community in Arkansas, U.S.

Coordinates: 34°52′00″N 94°04′14″W

The Pines is an unincorporated community in Scott County, in the U.S. state of Arkansas.

== History ==
According to tradition, this former logging town was named for the pine log cabins which once stood near the town site.
