= Township 11, Benton County, Arkansas =

Township 11
- Township
- Location in Arkansas
- Coordinates: 36°23′37″N 94°28′6″W
- Country: United States
- State: Arkansas
- County: Benton

Area
  - Total: 207.804 sq mi (538.21 km^{2})
  - Land: 207.558 sq mi (537.57 km^{2})
  - Water: 0.246 sq mi (0.64 km^{2})

Population (2010)
  - Total: 12,273
  - Density: 59.13/sq mi (22.83/km^{2})
- Time zone: UTC-6 (CST)
  - Summer (DST): UTC-5 (CDT)
- Area code: 479

Township 11 is one of thirteen current townships in Benton County, Arkansas, USA. As of the 2010 census, its total population was 12,273.

== Geography ==
According to the United States Census Bureau, Township 11 covers an area of 207.804 square miles (538.21 km^{2}); 207.558 square miles (537.57 km^{2}) of land and 0.246 square miles (0.64 km^{2}) of water.

=== Cities, towns, and villages ===
- Centerton (small part)
- Cherokee City
- Decatur
- Gravette
- Highfill (small part)
- Hiwasse (small part)
- Maysville
- Sulphur Springs
