= Tamo, Arkansas =

Community in Arkansas

Tamo is a populated place in Jefferson County, Arkansas. It had a post office. Howard Baker's grocery store, a gas station, and a few small businesses were in the area. A water tower remains. The Encyclopedia of Arkansas describes it as a having been a small farming community 15 miles from Pine Bluff, Arkansas.

Ira James Kohath Wells (1898–1997) an educator who served as West Virginia's first State Supervisor of Negro Education from 1933 to 1952 was born in Tamo. He also established Color Magazine. Photographer Geleve Grice (1922-2004) was born in Tamo.

A hardwood mill was planned in Tamo. Tamo Mercantile Compmy was in Tamo. The disposition of assets of the business were the subject of an Arkansas Supreme Court case.

There is a Tamo River Road in nearby Grady, Arkansas.
