= Elm Springs, Arkansas =

- City
- Seal

- Location of Elm Springs in Benton County and Washington County, Arkansas
- Coordinates: 36°12′26″N 94°14′18″W
- Country: United States
- State: Arkansas
- Counties: Washington, Benton
- Founded: 1832
- Incorporated: May 23, 1917

Government
  - Type: Mayor–Council
  - Mayor: Harold Douthit
  - Chief of Police: Jason Hiatt

Area
  - Total: 5.98 sq mi (15.50 km^{2})
  - Land: 5.95 sq mi (15.41 km^{2})
  - Water: 0.035 sq mi (0.09 km^{2})
- Elevation: 1,158 ft (353 m)

Population (2020)
  - Total: 2,361
  - Estimate (2025): 2,852 ▲
  - Density: 396.7/sq mi (153.17/km^{2})
- Time zone: UTC-6 (Central (CST))
  - Summer (DST): UTC-5 (CDT)
- ZIP code: 72728
- Area code: 479
- FIPS code: 05-21430
- GNIS feature ID: 2403561
- Website: www.elmsprings.net

Elm Springs is a city in Benton and Washington counties, Arkansas, United States. As of the 2020 census, Elm Springs had a population of 2,361. Located immediately west of Springdale in the Northwest Arkansas metropolitan statistical area, Elm Springs has been gaining population in recent years, including a 47% increase in population between the 2000 and 2010 censuses.

== History ==
The first permanent settlement at Elm Springs was made in the 1840s. The town took its name from a large spring near the original town site.

=== Civil War ===
Elm Springs served as a gathering point for newly recruited confederate soldiers in 1861 prior to the Battle of Pea Ridge. By 1862, Elm Springs was a mustering site for confederate units from Arkansas and Missouri. Two minor skirmishes were fought in Elm Springs on April 26, and July 30, 1863.

== Geography ==
Elm Springs is located between the Boston Mountains and the Springfield Plateau within the Ozark Mountains. Initially a community surrounding a spring-fed mill, the community flourished even after the mill's destruction during the Civil War.

According to the United States Census Bureau, the city has a total area of 5.79 sq mi (15.0 km^{2}).

== Demographics ==
Historical population
Census	Pop.	Note	%±
1930	182		—
1940	156		−14.3%
1950	217		39.1%
1960	238		9.7%
1970	260		9.2%
1980	781		200.4%
1990	893		14.3%
2000	1,044		16.9%
2010	1,535		47.0%
2020	2,361		53.8%
2025 (est.)	2,852	▲	20.8%
U.S. Decennial Census

=== 2020 census ===
As of the 2020 census, Elm Springs had a population of 2,361. There were 820 households, including 702 families residing in the city.

The median age was 41.4 years. 26.4% of residents were under the age of 18 and 13.8% of residents were 65 years of age or older. For every 100 females there were 101.3 males, and for every 100 females age 18 and over there were 102.0 males age 18 and over.

58.9% of residents lived in urban areas, while 41.1% lived in rural areas.

Of the 820 households, 39.0% had children under the age of 18 living in them. Of all households, 72.1% were married-couple households, 10.2% were households with a male householder and no spouse or partner present, and 13.3% were households with a female householder and no spouse or partner present. About 13.5% of all households were made up of individuals, and 5.2% had someone living alone who was 65 years of age or older.

There were 882 housing units, of which 7.0% were vacant. The homeowner vacancy rate was 0.7% and the rental vacancy rate was 10.2%.

Elm Springs racial composition
Race	Number	Percentage
White (non-Hispanic)	1,847	78.23%
Black or African American (non-Hispanic)	28	1.19%
Native American	7	0.3%
Asian	31	1.31%
Pacific Islander	6	0.25%
Other/Mixed	158	6.69%
Hispanic or Latino	284	12.03%

=== 2010 census ===
As of the census of 2010, 1,535 people, 527 households, and 439 families were residing in the city. The population density was 276.9 inhabitants per square mile (106.9/km^{2}). The 577 housing units averaged 108.7/sq mi (42.0/km^{2}). The racial makeup of the city was 87.4% White, 1.2% African American, 1.4% Native American, 2.9% Asian, .2% from other races, and 1.4% from two or more races. About 8.5% of the population were Hispanics or Latinos of any race.

Of the 527 households, 37.2% had children under the age of 18 living with them, 71.9% were married couples living together, 6.5% had a female householder with no husband present, and 16.7% were not families. About 16.7% of all households were made up of individuals, and 4.7% had someone living alone who was 65 years of age or older. The average household size was 2.91, and the average family size was 3.21.

In the city, the age distribution was 26.7% under 18, 7.7% from 18 to 24, 24.2% from 25 to 44, 30.4% from 45 to 64, and 11.5% who were 65 or older. The median age was 39.7 years. For every 100 females, there were 103.3 males.

=== 2000 census ===
In 2000, The median income for a household in the city was $40,703, and for a family was $45,536. Males had a median income of $30,550 versus $20,000 for females. The per capita income for the city was $17,551. About 8.6% of families and 12.5% of the population were below the poverty line, including 19.8% of those under age 18 and 5.0% of those age 65 or over.

== Education ==
All of Elm Springs is zoned to Springdale Public Schools.

In 2022 much of Elm Springs is zoned to Shaw Elementary School (areas north of 412), with some areas in the east zoned to Bernice Young Elementary School. All of Elm Springs is zoned to Hellstern Middle School, Central Junior High School, and Har-Ber High School.

Elm Springs, in 2006, was divided between Hunt and Young elementary schools. All portions were zoned to Hellstern Middle School, Central Junior High School, and Har-Ber High.

== Transportation ==
=== Transit ===
As of 2023, there is no fixed route transit service in Elm Springs. Ozark Regional Transit operates demand-response service in the city. The nearest intercity bus service is provided by Jefferson Lines in nearby Fayetteville.

=== Roadways ===
- Highway 112

== Points of interest ==
- Lake Elmdale, a popular fishing and bird-watching location, was built and is maintained by the Arkansas Game and Fish Commission.
- Steele-Stevens Heritage Park is located around the city's namesake spring.
