= Township 9, Benton County, Arkansas =

Township 9
- Township
- Location in Arkansas
- Coordinates: 36°21′16″N 94°16′10″W
- Country: United States
- State: Arkansas
- County: Benton

Area
  - Total: 49.497 sq mi (128.20 km^{2})
  - Land: 49.143 sq mi (127.28 km^{2})
  - Water: 0.354 sq mi (0.92 km^{2})

Population (2010)
  - Total: 31,362
  - Density: 638.18/sq mi (246.40/km^{2})
- Time zone: UTC-6 (CST)
  - Summer (DST): UTC-5 (CDT)
- Area code: 479

Township 9 is one of thirteen current townships in Benton County, Arkansas, USA. As of the 2010 census, its total population was 31,362.

== Geography ==
According to the United States Census Bureau, Township 9 covers an area of 49.497 square miles (128.20 km^{2}); 49.143 square miles (127.28 km^{2}) of land and 0.354 square miles (0.92 km^{2}) of water.

=== Cities, towns, and villages ===
- Bentonville (most of)
- Centerton (most of)
- Highfill (small part of)
