= Township 12, Benton County, Arkansas =

Township 12
- Township
- Location in Arkansas
- Coordinates: 36°14′21″N 94°31′22″W
- Country: United States
- State: Arkansas
- County: Benton

Area
  - Total: 43.028 sq mi (111.44 km^{2})
  - Land: 41.913 sq mi (108.55 km^{2})
  - Water: 1.115 sq mi (2.89 km^{2})

Population (2010)
  - Total: 15,158
  - Density: 361.65/sq mi (139.63/km^{2})
- Time zone: UTC-6 (CST)
  - Summer (DST): UTC-5 (CDT)
- Area code: 479

Township 12 is one of thirteen current townships in Benton County, Arkansas, USA. As of the 2010 census, its total population was 15,158.

== Geography ==
According to the United States Census Bureau, Township 12 covers an area of 43.028 square miles (111.44 km^{2}); 41.913 square miles (108.55 km^{2}) of land and 1.115 square miles (2.89 km^{2}) of water.

=== Cities, towns, and villages ===
- Gentry (most of)
- Siloam Springs (more than half of)
