= Cary Township, Wake County, North Carolina =

Township in North Carolina, United States

Coordinates: 35.7913574°N 78.7816219°W

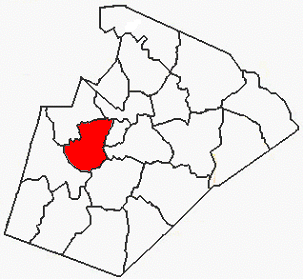

Cary Township (also designated Township 4) is one of twenty townships within Wake County, North Carolina, United States. As of the 2010 United States census, Cary Township had a population of 74,074.

Cary Township, occupying 32.4 square miles (83.9 km^{2}) in western Wake County, includes the bulk of the town of Cary and portions of the town of Apex and the city of Raleigh. Cary Township contains two high schools: Cary High School (public) and Cary Academy (private).
