= Township 7, Benton County, Arkansas =

Township 7
- Township
- Location in Arkansas Location in the United States
- Coordinates: 36°27′15″N 94°9′13″W
- Country: United States
- State: Arkansas
- County: Benton

Area
  - Total: 61.597 sq mi (159.54 km^{2})
  - Land: 61.233 sq mi (158.59 km^{2})
  - Water: 0.364 sq mi (0.94 km^{2})

Population (2010)
  - Total: 20,317
  - Density: 331.8/sq mi (128.1/km^{2})
- Time zone: UTC-6 (CST)
  - Summer (DST): UTC-5 (CDT)
- Area code: 479

Township 7 is one of thirteen current townships in Benton County, Arkansas, United States. As of the 2010 census, its population was 20,317.

== Geography ==
According to the United States Census Bureau, Township 7 covers an area of 61.597 square miles (159.54 km^{2}); 61.233 square miles (158.59 km^{2}) of land and 0.364 square miles (0.94 km^{2}) of water.

=== Cities, towns, and villages ===
- Bella Vista (part of)
- Bentonville (small part)
- Pea Ridge (most of)
