= Middle Creek Township, Wake County, North Carolina =

Township in Wake County, North Carolina, U.S.

Coordinates: 35.5853059°N 78.7702895°W

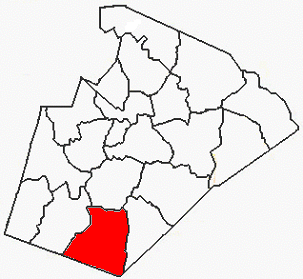

Middle Creek Township (also designated Township 12) is one of twenty townships within Wake County, North Carolina, United States. As of the 2010 United States census, Middle Creek Township had a population of 44,136, a 75.5% increase over 2000.

Middle Creek Township, occupying 60.8 square miles (157.5 km^{2}) in southern Wake County, includes most of the town of Fuquay-Varina and portions of the town of Holly Springs.

== Watersheds ==
Neills Creek, a tributary to the Cape Fear River, rises in the southern end of this township.
