= Tuttle, Arkansas =

- Unincorporated community
- Tuttle's position in Arkansas Tuttle, Arkansas (the United States)
- Coordinates: 36°02′01.3″N 93°58′20.7″W
- Country: United States
- State: Arkansas
- County: Washington
- Township: Richland
- Established: 1907
- Elevation: 1,250 ft (381 m)
- Time zone: UTC-6 (Central (CST))
  - Summer (DST): UTC-5 (CDT)
- ZIP code: 72727
- Area code: 479
- GNIS feature ID: 57216

Tuttle is an unincorporated community in eastern Washington County, Arkansas, United States. It is located at the intersection of Highway 74 and Washington County Road 79.

== History ==
A post office was established in 1907, but was closed five years later. The settlement was named after James M. Tuttle, or the Tuttle family who lived in the area as early as the 1840s.
