= Buckhorn Township, Wake County, North Carolina =

Township in North Carolina, United States

Coordinates: 35.6551465°N 78.9401383°W

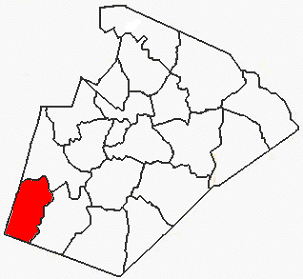

Buckhorn Township (also designated Township 3) is one of twenty townships within Wake County, North Carolina, United States. As of the 2010 United States census, Buckhorn Township had a population of 3,251.

Buckhorn Township, occupying 39.3 square miles (101.8 km^{2}) in southwestern Wake County, includes small portions of the towns of Apex and Holly Springs.

== See also ==
- Buckhorn Township, Harnett County, North Carolina
