= Township 3, Benton County, Arkansas =

Township 3
- Township
- Location in Arkansas
- Coordinates: 36°16′22″N 94°7′30″W
- Country: United States
- State: Arkansas
- County: Benton

Area
  - Total: 10.572 sq mi (27.38 km^{2})
  - Land: 10.524 sq mi (27.26 km^{2})
  - Water: 0.048 sq mi (0.12 km^{2})

Population (2010)
  - Total: 20,037
  - Density: 1,903.93/sq mi (735.11/km^{2})
- Time zone: UTC-6 (CST)
  - Summer (DST): UTC-5 (CDT)
- Area code: 479

Township 3 is one of thirteen current townships in Benton County, Arkansas, United States. As of the 2010 census, its total population was 20,037.

== Geography ==
According to the United States Census Bureau, Township 3 covers an area of 10.572 square miles (27.38 km^{2}); 10.524 square miles (27.26 km^{2}) of land and 0.048 square miles (0.12 km^{2}) of water.

=== Cities, towns, and villages ===
- Bethel Heights (most of)
- Lowell (part)
- Rogers (part)
- Springdale (part)
