= Avoca, Arkansas =

- Town
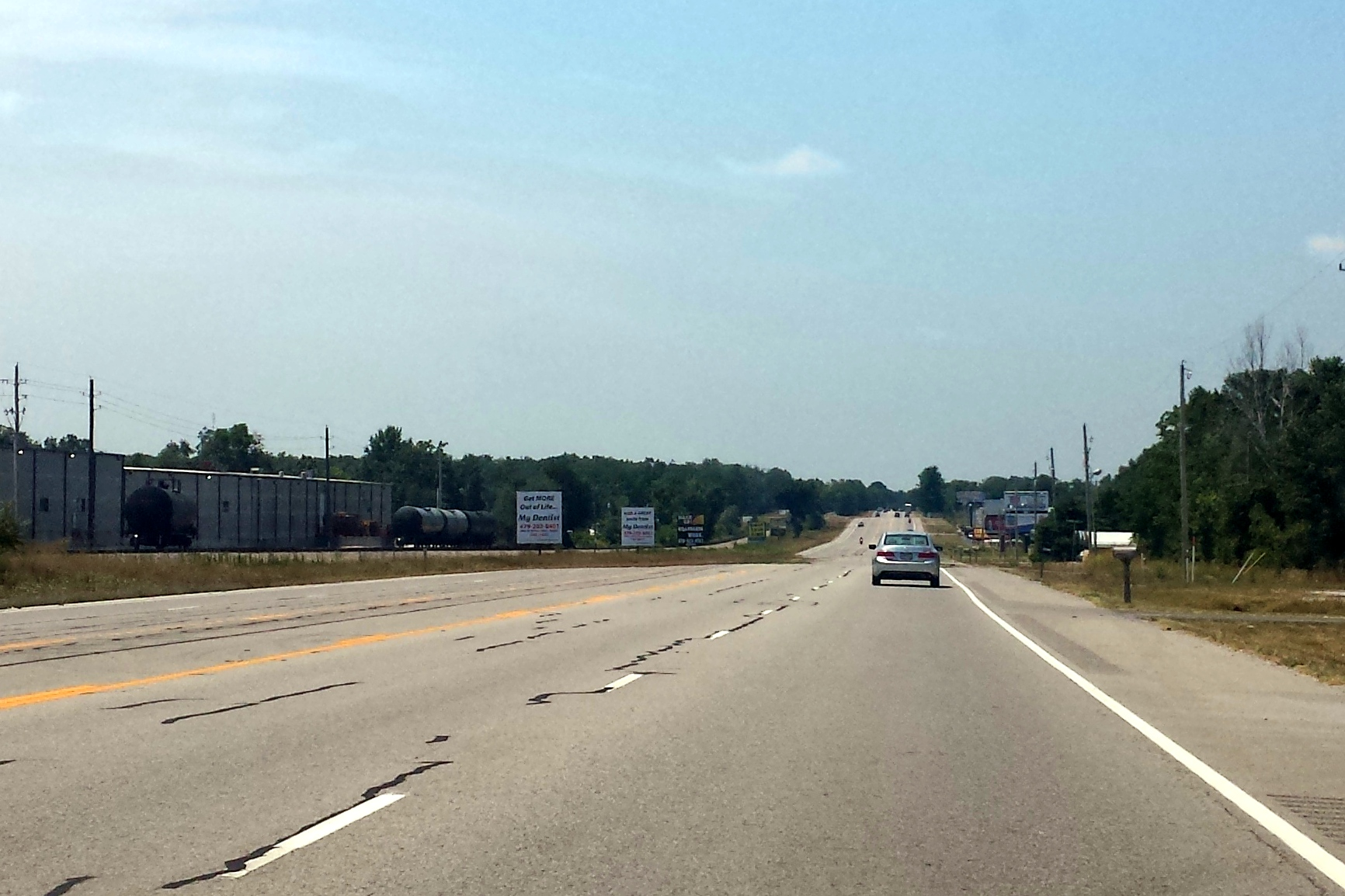
- U.S. Highway 62 runs through Avoca.

- Seal

- Location of Avoca in Benton County, Arkansas
- Coordinates: 36°24′5″N 94°4′15″W
- Country: United States
- State: Arkansas
- County: Benton

Area
  - Total: 1.88 sq mi (4.86 km^{2})
  - Land: 1.88 sq mi (4.86 km^{2})
  - Water: 0 sq mi (0.00 km^{2})
- Elevation: 1,345 ft (410 m)

Population (2020)
  - Total: 487
  - Estimate (2025): 545 ▲
  - Density: 260/sq mi (100.3/km^{2})
- Time zone: UTC-6 (Central (CST))
  - Summer (DST): UTC-5 (CDT)
- ZIP code: 72711
- Area code: 479
- FIPS code: 05-03040
- GNIS feature ID: 2405190
- Website: www.avocaarkansas.gov

Avoca is a town in Benton County, Arkansas, United States. The population was 487 at the 2020 census. It is part of the Northwest Arkansas region.

It is named after the town of Avoca in Ireland.

== History ==
Avoca was platted in 1881. A post office called Avoca has been in operation since 1872.

== Geography ==
Avoca is located in east-central Benton County at 36°24′00″N 94°04′24″W, 6 miles (10 km) northeast of the center of Rogers. U.S. Route 62 passes through the town, leading southwest 7 miles (11 km) to Interstate 540 in Bentonville and northeast 11 miles (18 km) to Gateway near the Missouri border.

According to the United States Census Bureau, Avoca has a total area of 1.8 square miles (4.7 km^{2}), all land.

== Demographics ==
Historical population
Census	Pop.	Note	%±
1970	173		—
1980	256		48.0%
1990	269		5.1%
2000	423		57.2%
2010	488		15.4%
2020	487		−0.2%
2025 (est.)	545	▲	11.9%
U.S. Decennial Census; 2018 Estimate

As of the census of 2000, there were 423 people, 162 households, and 121 families residing in the town. The population density was 233.7/mi² (90.2/km^{2}). There were 168 housing units at an average density of 92.8/mi² 35.8/km^{2}). The racial makeup of the town was 92.43% White, 1.65% Native American, 0.24% Asian, 0.71% Pacific Islander, 3.31% from other races, and 1.65% from two or more races. 6.15% of the population were Hispanic or Latino of any race.

There were 162 households, out of which 30.2% had children under the age of 18 living with them, 59.3% were married couples living together, 11.7% had a female householder with no husband present, and 25.3% were non-families. 19.8% of all households were made up of individuals, and 8.6% had someone living alone who was 65 years of age or older. The average household size was 2.61 and the average family size was 3.02.

In the town, the population was spread out, with 25.5% under the age of 18, 9.5% from 18 to 24, 26.5% from 25 to 44, 26.2% from 45 to 64, and 12.3% who were 65 years of age or older. The median age was 39 years. For every 100 females there were 94.9 males. For every 100 females age 18 and over, there were 88.6 males.

The median income for a household in the town was $41,964, and the median income for a family was $47,500. Males had a median income of $32,708 versus $25,167 for females. The per capita income for the town was $17,028. About 4.2% of families and 7.8% of the population were below the poverty line, including 5.9% of those under age 18 and 12.0% of those age 65 or over.

== Education ==
Public education for early childhood, elementary and secondary school students is provided by the Rogers School District.
