= Tag, Arkansas =

- Unincorporated community
- Position in Arkansas
- Coordinates: 35°31′53″N 93°02′30″W
- Country: United States
- State: Arkansas
- County: Pope
- Elevation: 558 ft (170 m)
- Time zone: UTC-6 (Central (CST))
  - Summer (DST): UTC-5 (CDT)
- GNIS feature ID: 73816

Tag is an unincorporated community in the Ozark National Forest, Pope County, Arkansas, United States.
