= Little River Township, Wake County, North Carolina =

Township in Wake County, North Carolina, U.S.

Coordinates: 35.8434853°N 78.3159411°W

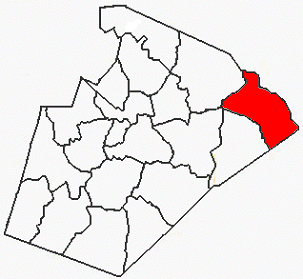

Little River Township (also designated Township 9) is one of twenty townships within Wake County, North Carolina, United States. As of the 2010 United States census, Little River Township had a population of 12,528, a 14.0% increase over 2000.

Little River Township, occupying 53.8 square miles (139.3 km^{2}) in eastern Wake County, includes the entire town of Zebulon.
