= Eldorado Springs, Arkansas =

Ghost town in, Benton County, Arkansas

Coordinates: 36.36813°N 94.53494°W

Eldorado Springs is an extinct town in Benton County, in the U.S. state of Arkansas.

== History ==
A variant name was "Eldorado". Eldorado had its start in the 1880s, centered around a mineral spa.
