= Meredith Township, Wake County, North Carolina =

Township in Wake County, North Carolina, U.S.

Coordinates: 35.8113323°N 78.7079381°W

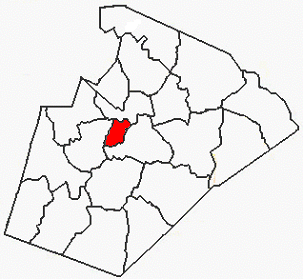

Meredith Township (also designated Township 11) is one of twenty townships within Wake County, North Carolina, United States. As of the 2010 United States census, Meredith Township had a population of 13,926, a 21.2% increase over 2000.

Meredith Township, occupying 9.6 square miles (24.8 km^{2}) in central Wake County, is almost completely occupied by portions of the city of Raleigh.
