= Turner, Mississippi County, Arkansas =

Turner, Arkansas
- Unincorporated community
- Location within Arkansas Location within the United States
- Coordinates: 35°50′13″N 90°03′42″W
- Country: United States
- State: Arkansas
- County: Mississippi
- Elevation: 236 ft (72 m)
- Time zone: UTC-6 (Central (CST))
  - Summer (DST): UTC-5 (CDT)
- Area code: 870
- GNIS feature ID: 58772

Turner is an unincorporated community in Mississippi County, Arkansas, United States. Turner is 2 miles (3.2 km) southwest of Dell. During World War II, airmen cadets from the British Royal Air Force, flying from their training base at Terrell, Texas, routinely flew to Turner on training flights. The community served as a stand-in for the British for Emden, Germany, which was the same distance from London, England as Turner is from Terrell.
