= Benton County, Arkansas =

County in Arkansas, United States

- County
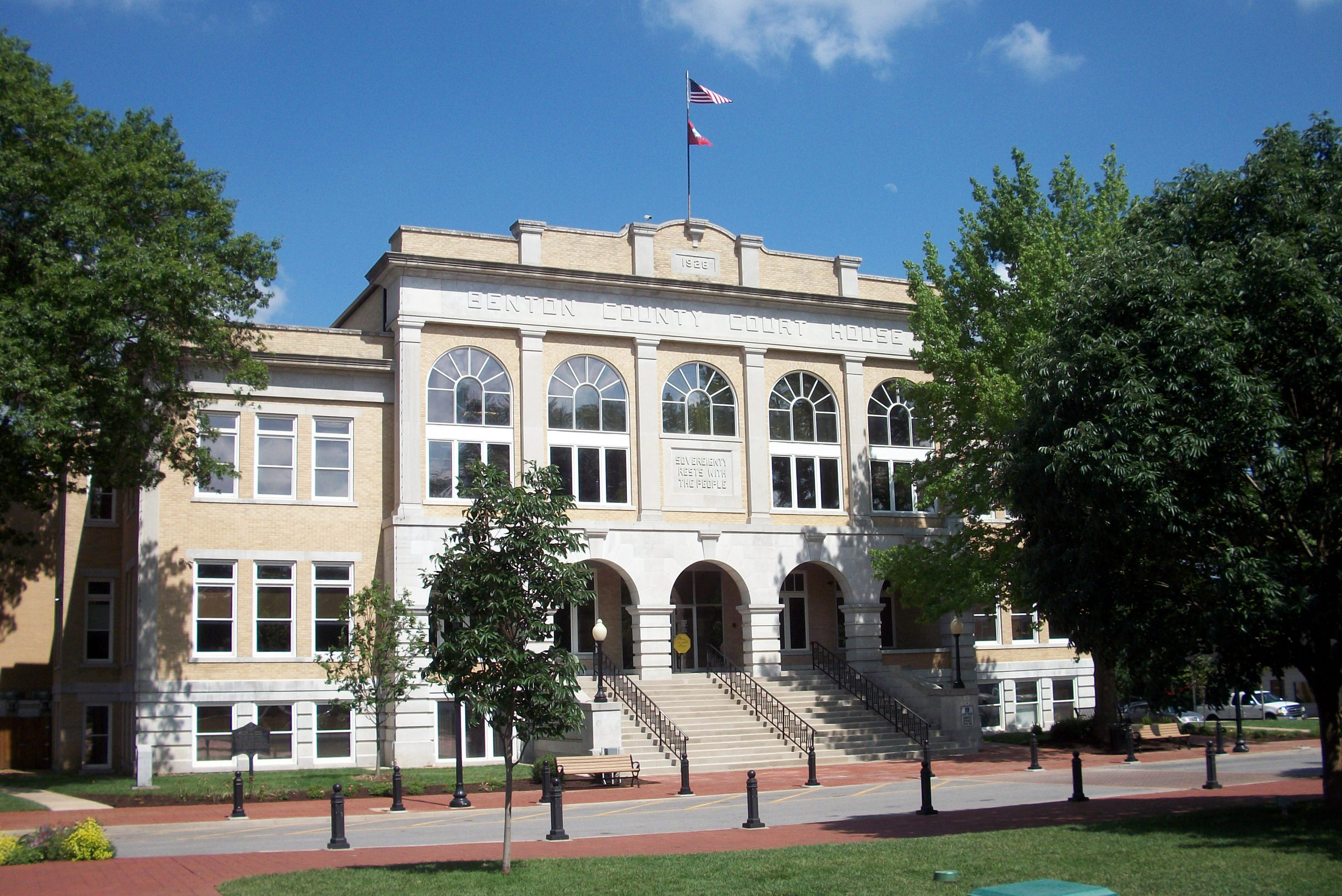
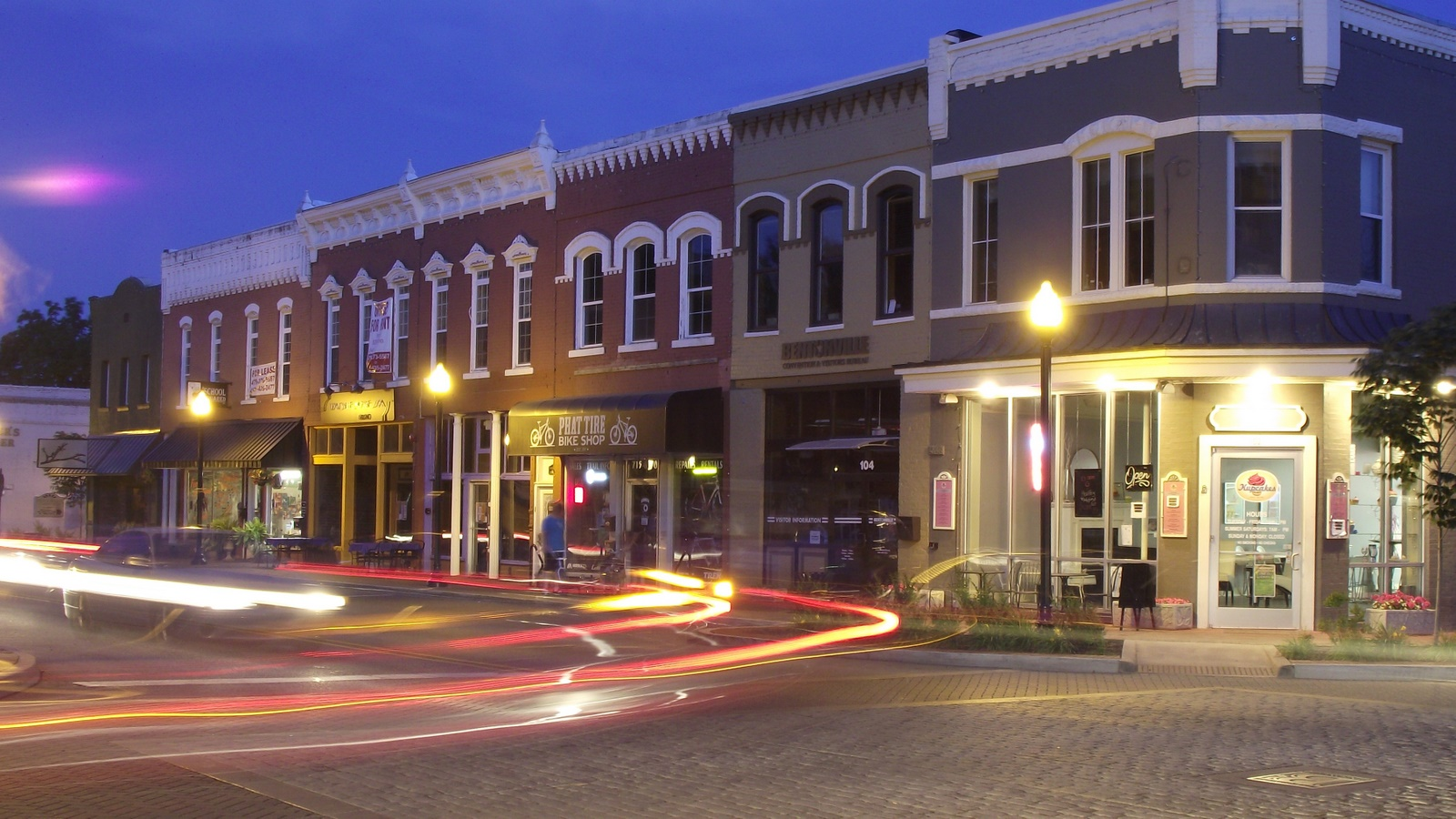
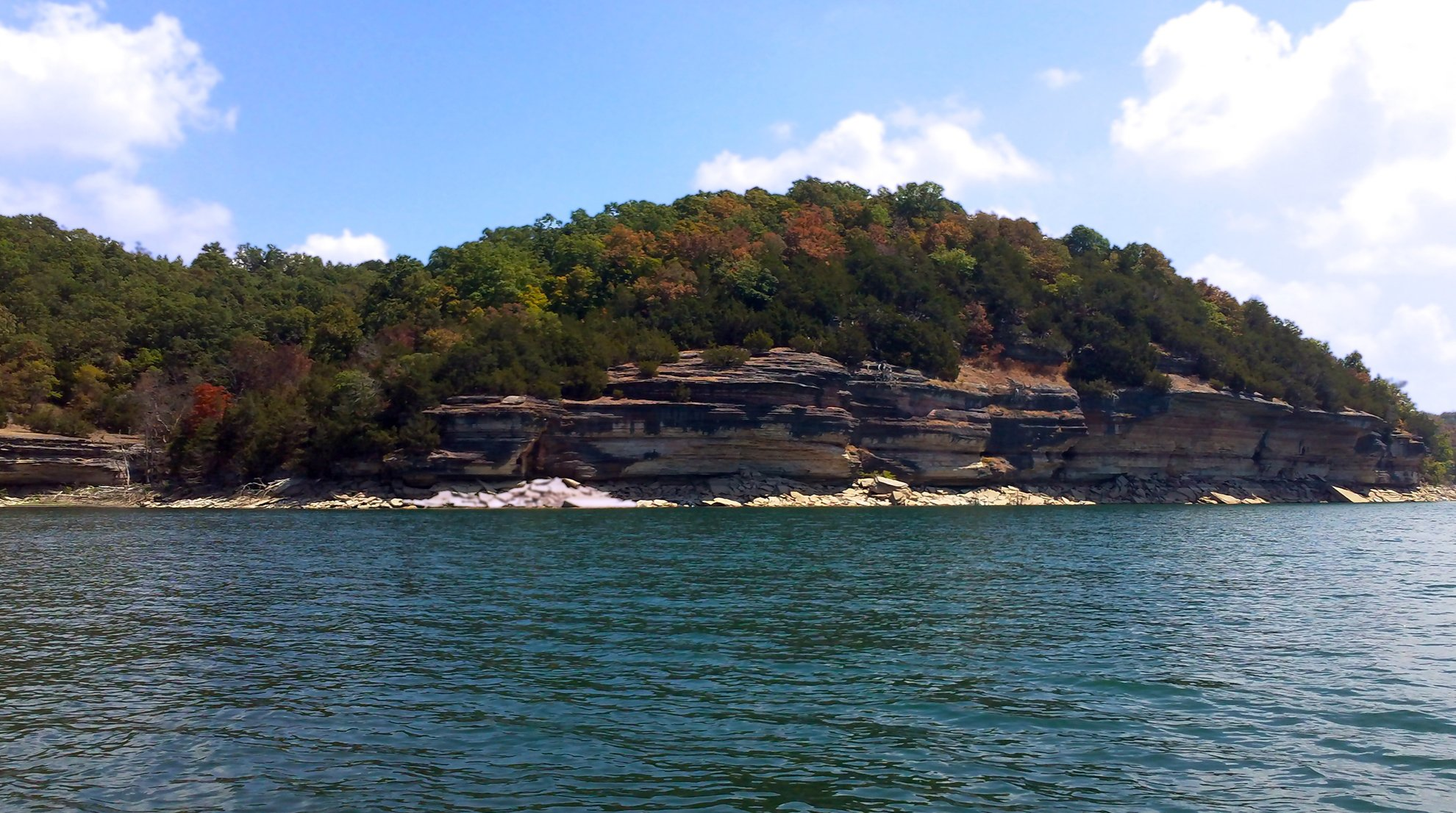
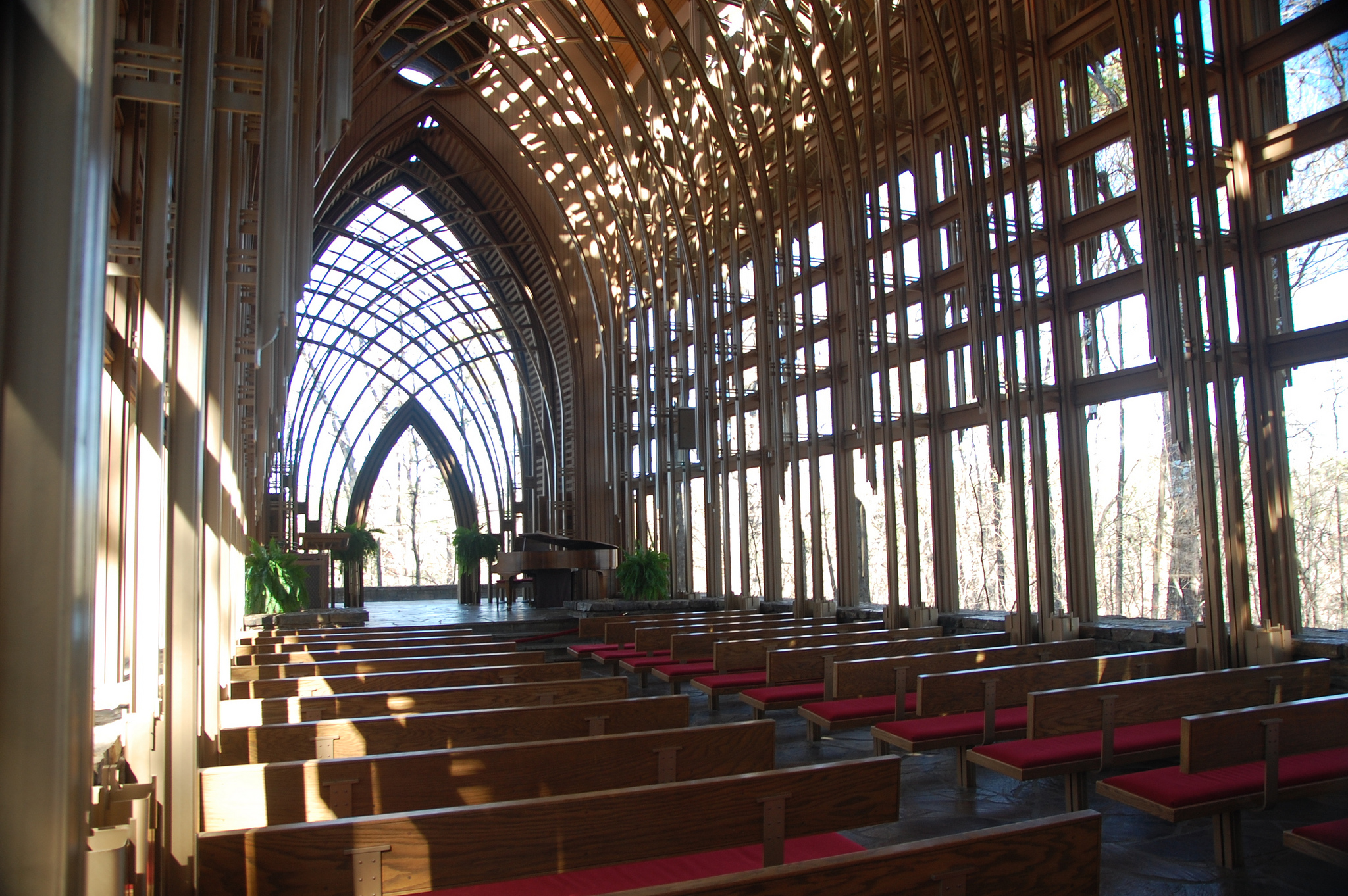
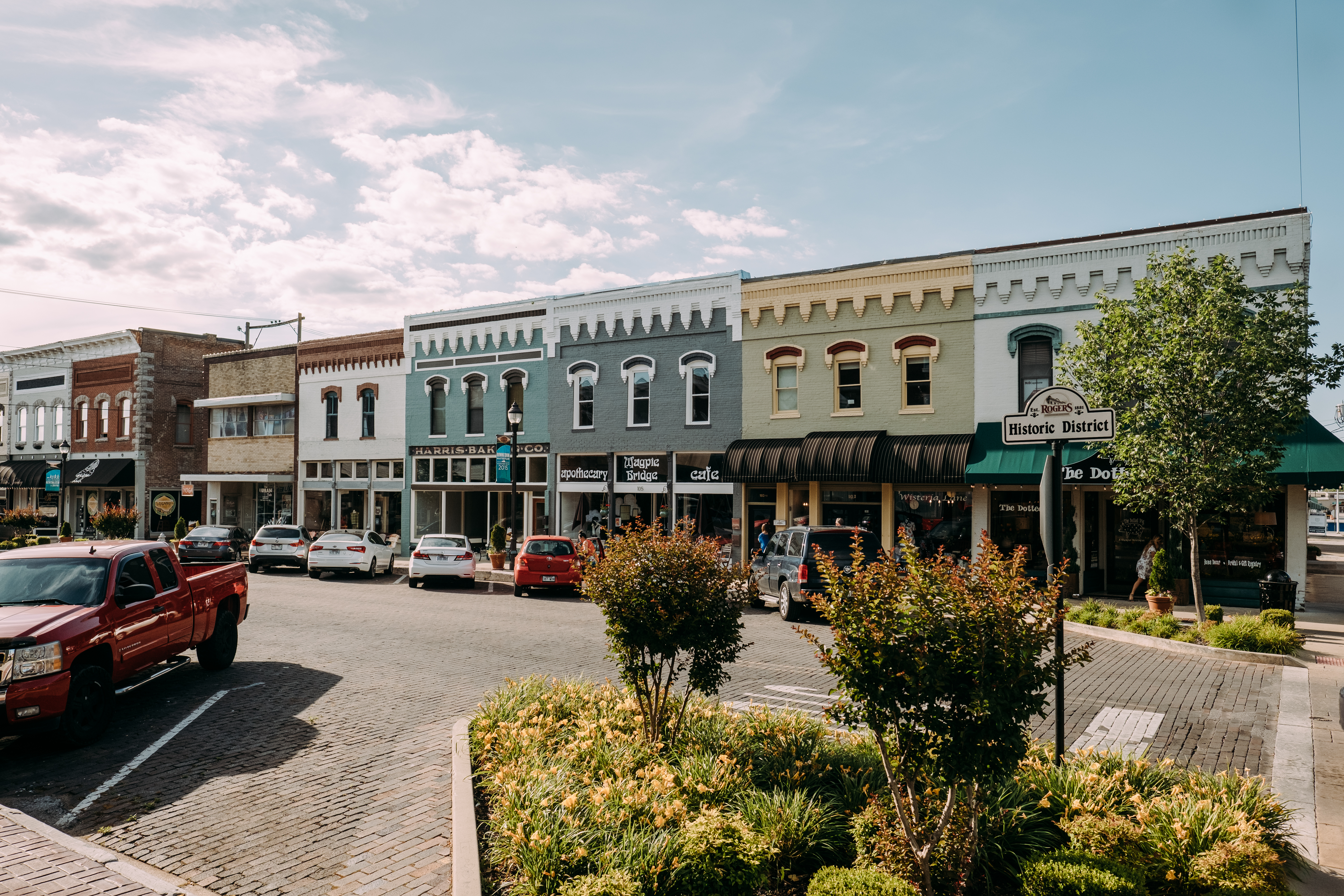
- The Benton County Courthouse in Bentonville Downtown Bentonville Beaver Lake Mildred B. Cooper Memorial Chapel in Bella Vista Downtown Rogers

- Flag Seal

- Location within the U.S. state of Arkansas
- Coordinates: 36.337819°N 94.256298°W
- Country: United States
- State: Arkansas
- Founded: September 30, 1836
- Named for: Thomas Hart Benton
- Seat: Bentonville
- Largest city: Rogers

Government
  - County judge: Barry Moehring

Area
  - Total: 884.363 sq mi (2,290.49 km^{2})
  - Land: 847.733 sq mi (2,195.62 km^{2})
  - Water: 36.630 sq mi (94.87 km^{2}) 4.14%

Population (2020)
  - Total: 284,333
  - Estimate (2025): 332,554 ▲
  - Density: 335.404/sq mi (129.500/km^{2})
- Time zone: UTC−6 (Central)
  - Summer (DST): UTC−5 (CDT)
- Area code: 479
- Congressional district: 3rd
- Website: bentoncountyar.gov

Benton County is a county in the Northwest region of the U.S. state of Arkansas. Created as Arkansas' 35th county on September 30, 1836, Benton County contains thirteen incorporated municipalities, including Bentonville, the county seat, and Rogers, the most populous city. The county was named after Thomas Hart Benton, a U.S. senator from Missouri influential in Arkansas statehood.

The county is located within the Springfield Plateau of the Ozarks. Much of eastern Benton County is located along Beaver Lake, a reservoir of the White River. The county contains three protected areas: Logan Cave National Wildlife Refuge, Pea Ridge National Military Park, and Devil's Eyebrow Natural Area, as well as parts of the Ozark National Forest, Hobbs State Park – Conservation Area, and two state wildlife management areas.

Benton County occupies 884.86 square miles (229,180 ha) and contained a population of 284,333 people in 100,749 households as of the 2020 Census, ranking it tenth in size and second in population among the state's 75 counties. The county's economy is heavily influenced by the presence of Walmart, headquartered in Bentonville, and hundreds of associated businesses, with agriculture, tourism, and construction also important sectors. Benton County's median household income is the highest in Arkansas and slightly above the national median.

== History ==
Prior to white settlement of the county, the region was used by roving bands of Osage and Delaware who used the area for seasonal hunting grounds. Initial white settlement on Benton County took place around Maysville around 1830, followed by areas around Garfield, Cross Hollow, and Centerton. Settlers were predominantly from Tennessee, followed by Southern Piedmont states. Benton County was created from neighboring Washington County by the Arkansas General Assembly on September 30, 1836. Created shortly after statehood, it was named for Thomas Hart Benton, a U.S. Senator from Missouri influential in Arkansas's statehood.

Following establishment, a citizen committee was established to select the county seat. It decided to create Bentonville, with a town square and 136 lots around it, in 1837. The first building serving as courthouse was the home of George P. Wallace, the first county judge, for the 1837 court term. By the following year, a log structure on the north side of the Bentonville square was complete and served as the first permanent courthouse. In 1841, a contractor was building a brick courthouse in the middle of the Bentonville square. It was burned by Union troops during the Civil War in 1862. Court resumed after the war in a rented office for a few months until a new two-story frame building was constructed east of the county jail. In 1870, the search for a more permanent home for county government began, and a new structure was finished after significant struggle and controversy, in 1874. This building was replaced by the present-day Benton County Courthouse in 1928.

On May 26, 2024, Benton County experienced the largest tornado in Arkansas history, an EF3 with a width of 1.8 miles (2.9 km). This also initiated the first ever Arkansas appearance of FEMA for emergency disaster relief.

== Geography ==
Benton County is located within the Springfield Plateau subset of the Ozark Mountains. The plateau is gently rolling compared to the steeper Boston Mountains to the south and east, and contains karst features such as springs, losing streams, sinkholes, and caves. Groundcover historically consisted of oak–hickory forests, savannas, and tall grass prairies. Today, most of the forest and almost all of the prairie have been replaced by agriculture or expanding residential areas. Poultry, cattle, and hog farming are primary land uses; pastureland and hayland are common. Application of poultry litter to agricultural fields is a non-point source that can impair water quality. Total suspended solids and turbidity values in streams are usually low, but total dissolved solids and water hardness values are high.

According to the United States Census Bureau, the county has a total area of 884.363 square miles (2,290.49 km^{2}), of which 847.733 square miles (2,195.62 km^{2}) is land and 36.630 square miles (94.87 km^{2}) (4.14%) is water. It is the 12th largest county in Arkansas by total area. Most of the water is in Beaver Lake.

The county is located approximately 112 miles (180 km) east of Tulsa, Oklahoma, 212 miles (341 km) south of Kansas City, Missouri, and 215 miles (346 km) northwest of Little Rock, Arkansas. (Note: Mileages from Benton County to Tulsa, Kansas City, and Little Rock are based on highway miles using county seat Bentonville for Benton County.) Benton County is surrounded by Barry County, Missouri and McDonald County, Missouri to the north, Delaware County, Oklahoma and Adair County, Oklahoma to the west, Carroll County to the east, and the other two counties of the NWA metropolitan area: Madison County to the east, and Washington County to the south. The highest point in Benton County is near the Lost Bridge Village Community Center on Whitney Mountain (formerly known as Poor Mountain).

=== Hydrology ===
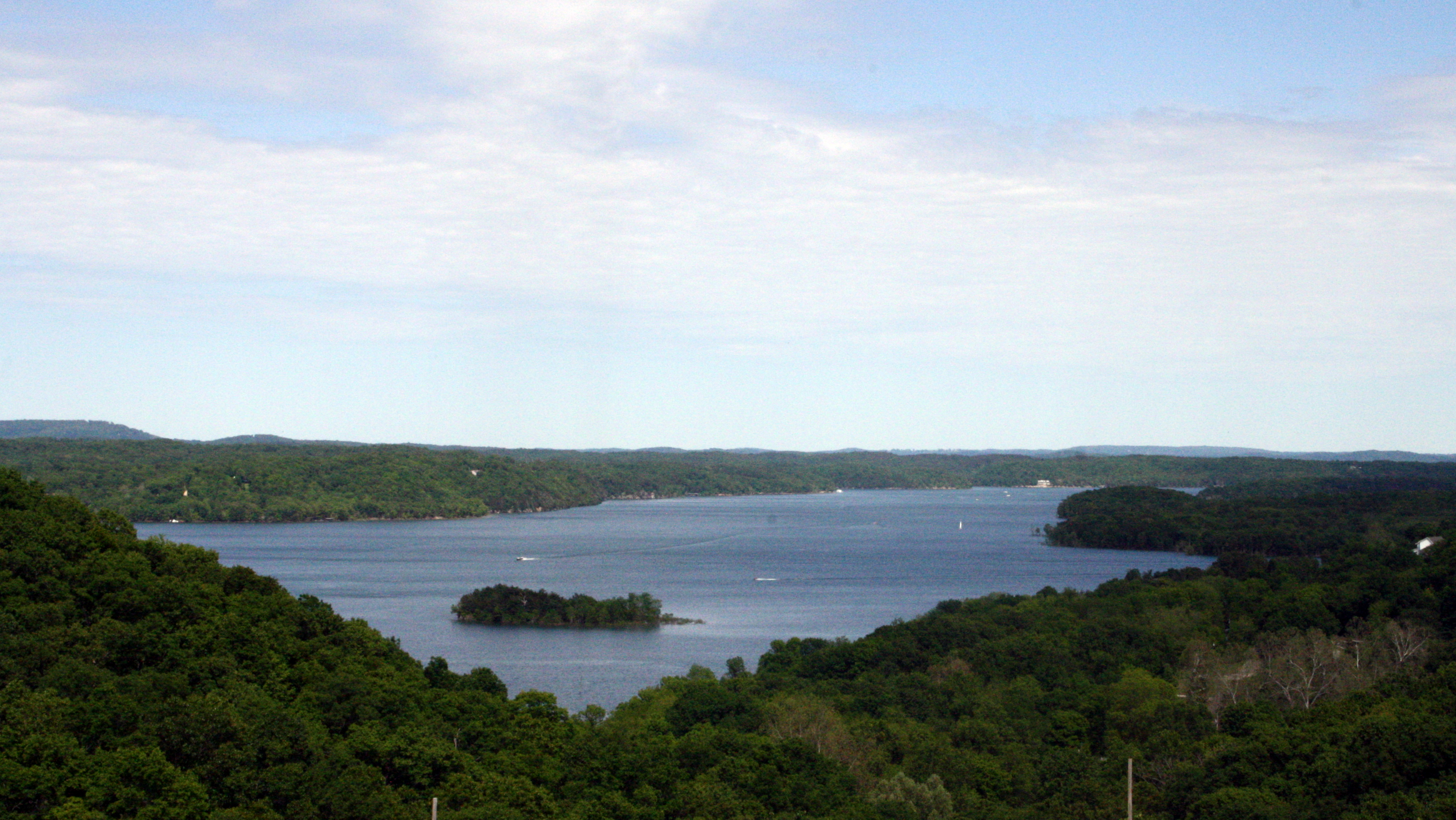
Beaver Lake as seen from the Prairie Creek community

Benton County is divided into five watersheds. The eastern part of the county is drained by the White River, which includes Beaver Lake. Major tributaries include War Eagle Creek, Little Clifty Creek, Spider Creek, Indian Creek, Prairie Creek and Esculapia Creek. Northern Benton County is within the Elk River watershed; the northeast corner is drained by tributaries to Big Sugar Creek; north central Benton County drains to Little Sugar Creek. The southwest part of Benton County is within the Illinois River watershed; southwest and south-central parts of the county drain to Osage Creek and western Benton County drains to Flint Creek or Spavinaw Creek. Northeastern Benton County drains to tributaries of the Neosho River. A very small part of northwestern Benton County drains to the Grand Lake.

The county has natural springs, which were very important to early settlers. Benton County communities named for their nearby springs include Cave Springs, Eldorado Springs, Elm Springs, Osage Mills, Siloam Springs, Springdale, Springtown, and Sulphur Springs.

=== Protected areas ===
Benton County contains eight protected areas and parts of three more. Three are federally administered, with the remainder under state jurisdiction.

Three areas preserve karst landforms: Logan Cave National Wildlife Refuge, which was created to preserve the endangered gray bat, endangered Benton cave crayfish, the threatened Ozark cavefish, and other significant cave dwelling wildlife species, Cave Springs Cave Natural Area, and Healing Springs Natural Area.

Beaver Lake Wildlife Management Area (WMA), Hobbs State Park - Conservation Area, and Devil's Eyebrow Natural Area preserve steep Ozark Mountain terrain around Beaver Lake. Two preserve the flat prairies of the Springfield Plateau: Chesney Prairie Natural Area and Searles Prairie Natural Area.

Pea Ridge National Military Park preserves the site and interprets the impact of the Battle of Pea Ridge during the American Civil War.

- Ozark National Forest (part)
- Wedington Wildlife Management Area

== Demographics ==
Historical population
Census	Pop.	Note	%±
1840	2,228		—
1850	3,710		66.5%
1860	9,306		150.8%
1870	13,831		48.6%
1880	20,328		47.0%
1890	27,716		36.3%
1900	31,611		14.1%
1910	33,389		5.6%
1920	36,253		8.6%
1930	35,253		−2.8%
1940	36,148		2.5%
1950	38,076		5.3%
1960	36,272		−4.7%
1970	50,476		39.2%
1980	78,115		54.8%
1990	97,499		24.8%
2000	153,406		57.3%
2010	221,339		44.3%
2020	284,333		28.5%
2025 (est.)	332,554	▲	17.0%
U.S. Decennial Census; 1790–1960 1900–1990; 1990–2000 2010–2020

=== Racial and ethnic composition ===
Benton County, Arkansas – racial and ethnic composition Note: the US Census treats Hispanic/Latino as an ethnic category. This table excludes Latinos from the racial categories and assigns them to a separate category. Hispanics/Latinos may be of any race.
Race / ethnicity (NH = Non-Hispanic)	Pop 1980	Pop 1990	Pop 2000	Pop 2010	Pop 2020	% 1980	% 1990	% 2000	% 2010	% 2020
White alone (NH)	76,255	94,158	133,094	169,605	191,761	97.62%	96.57%	86.76%	76.63%	67.44%
Black or African American alone (NH)	50	118	558	2,647	4,523	0.06%	0.12%	0.36%	1.20%	1.59%
Native American or Alaska Native alone (NH)	949	1,412	2,398	3,440	3,799	1.21%	1.45%	1.56%	1.55%	1.34%
Asian alone (NH)	245	441	1,644	6,245	13,602	0.31%	0.45%	1.07%	2.82%	4.78%
Native Hawaiian or Pacific Islander alone (NH)	x	x	127	634	2,598	x	x	0.08%	0.29%	0.91%
Other race alone (NH)	48	11	55	224	861	0.06%	0.01%	0.04%	0.10%	0.30%
Mixed-race or multiracial (NH)	x	x	2,061	4,261	16,649	x	x	1.34%	1.93%	5.86%
Hispanic or Latino (any race)	568	1,359	13,469	34,283	50,540	0.73%	1.39%	8.78%	15.49%	17.77%
Total	78,115	97,499	153,406	221,339	284,333	100.00%	100.00%	100.00%	100.00%	100.00%

=== 2020 census ===
As of the 2020 census, the county had a population of 284,333. The median age was 35.3 years. 26.6% of residents were under the age of 18 and 13.6% of residents were 65 years of age or older. For every 100 females there were 97.6 males, and for every 100 females age 18 and over there were 95.0 males age 18 and over.

The racial makeup of the county was 70.8% White, 1.7% Black or African American, 1.8% American Indian and Alaska Native, 4.8% Asian, 0.9% Native Hawaiian and Pacific Islander, 9.0% from some other race, and 11.0% from two or more races. Hispanic or Latino residents of any race comprised 17.8% of the population.

76.0% of residents lived in urban areas, while 24.0% lived in rural areas.

There were 104,111 households in the county, of which 37.2% had children under the age of 18 living in them. Of all households, 56.5% were married-couple households, 15.2% were households with a male householder and no spouse or partner present, and 22.0% were households with a female householder and no spouse or partner present. About 22.3% of all households were made up of individuals and 8.2% had someone living alone who was 65 years of age or older.

There were 113,088 housing units, of which 7.9% were vacant. Among occupied housing units, 67.1% were owner-occupied and 32.9% were renter-occupied. The homeowner vacancy rate was 1.9% and the rental vacancy rate was 7.9%.

=== 2010 census ===
As of the 2010 census, there were 221,339 people. The racial makeup of the county was 76.18% Non-Hispanic white, 1.27% Black or African American, 1.69% Native American, 2.85% Asian, 0.30% Pacific Islander. 15.49% of the population was Hispanic or Latino.

=== 2000 census ===
As of the 2000 census, there were 153,406 people, 58,212 households, and 43,484 families residing in the county. The population density was 181 inhabitants per square mile (70/km^{2}). There were 64,281 housing units at an average density of 76 per square mile (29/km^{2}). The racial makeup of the county was 90.87% White, 0.41% Black or African American, 1.65% Native American, 1.09% Asian, 0.08% Pacific Islander, 4.08% from other races, and 1.82% from two or more races. 8.78% of the population were Hispanic or Latino of any race.

As of 2005 estimates, Benton County's population was 81.7% non-Hispanic white, while the percentage of Latinos grew by 60 percent in the time period. 1.1% of the population was African-American; 1.6% was Native American (the historical presence of the Cherokee Indians live in close proximity to Oklahoma); 1.7% was Asian (there was a large influx of Filipinos, Vietnamese and South Asian immigrants in recent decades) and 0.2% of the population was Pacific Islander. 1.6% reported two or more races, usually not black-white due to a minuscule African-American population. 12.8% was Latino, but the United States Hispanic Chamber of Commerce believed the official estimate is underreported and Latinos could well be 20 percent of the population.

There were 58,212 households, out of which 34.40% had children under the age of 18 living with them, 63.00% were married couples living together, 8.20% had a female householder with no husband present, and 25.30% were non-families. 21.10% of all households were made up of individuals, and 8.50% had someone living alone who was 65 years of age or older. The average household size was 2.60 and the average family size was 3.01.

In the county, the population was spread out, with 26.60% under the age of 18, 8.60% from 18 to 24, 29.40% from 25 to 44, 21.10% from 45 to 64, and 14.30% who were 65 years of age or older. The median age was 35 years. For every 100 females, there were 97.40 males. For every 100 females age 18 and over, there were 94.90 males.

The median income for a household in the county was $40,281, and the median income for a family was $45,235. Males had a median income of $30,327 versus $22,469 for females. The per capita income for the county was $19,377. About 7.30% of families and 10.10% of the population were below the poverty line, including 13.80% of those under age 18 and 7.30% of those age 65 or over.

== Culture ==
After the end of Prohibition in 1933, Benton County voters voted that year to stay dry, and voted twice in 1944 to stay dry. In 2012, Benton County voters elected to make the county wet, allowing countywide retail alcohol sales.

== Economy ==
- Walmart was founded in Rogers, and its corporate headquarters is located in Bentonville.
- Daisy Outdoor Products, known for its air rifles, is headquartered in Rogers.
- JB Hunt Transport Services corporate headquarters is located in Lowell.
- Tyson Foods, based in Springdale, has a distribution center located in Rogers.
- Simmons Foods, a major supplier of poultry, pet, and animal nutrition products, is based in Siloam Springs.

== Transportation ==
=== Major highways ===
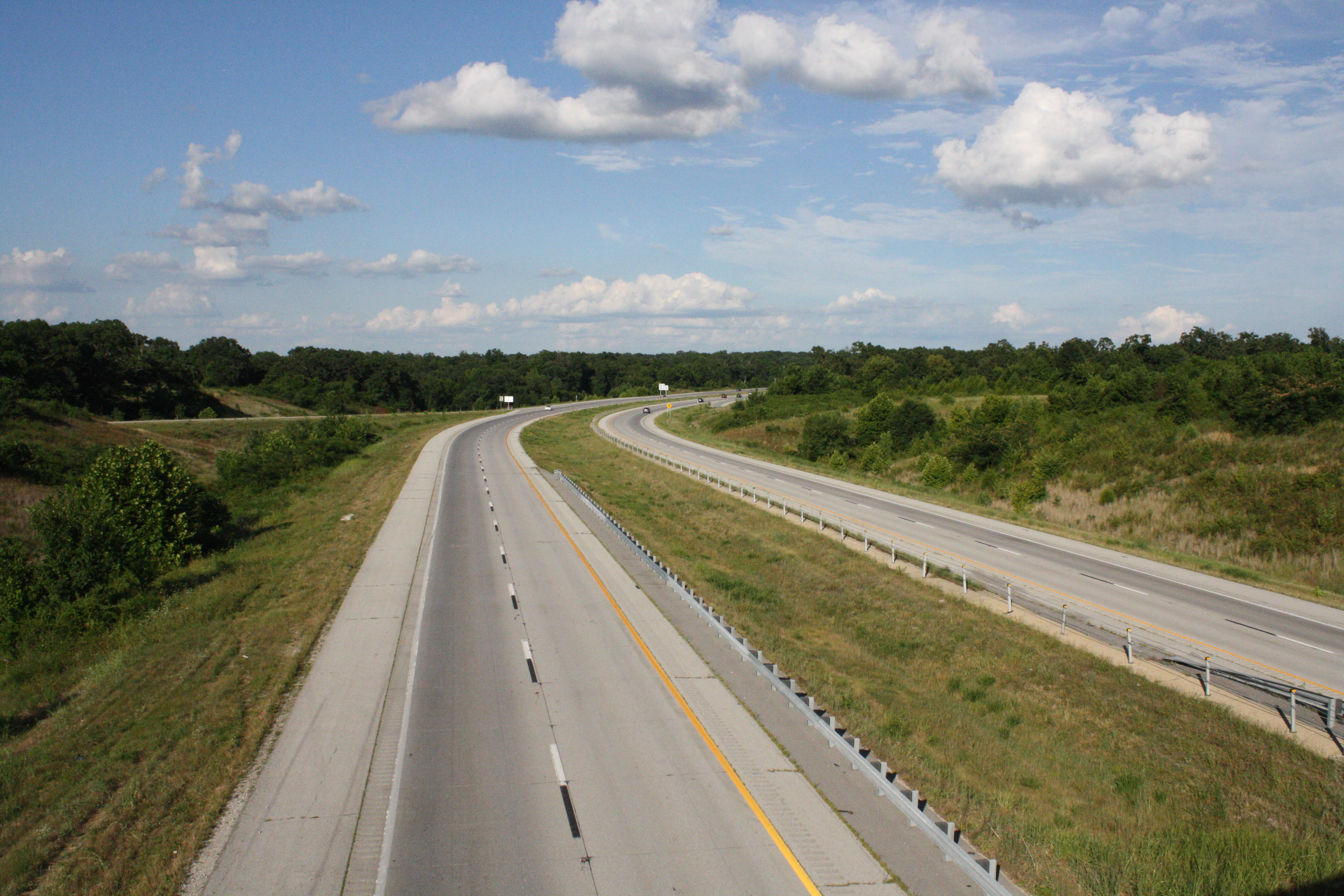
Looking east along I-49 from the AR 72 overpass in Gravette

- Interstate 42
- Interstate 49
- U.S. Highway 62
- U.S. Highway 71
- U.S. Highway 412
- Highway 12
- Highway 16
- Highway 37
- Highway 43
- Highway 59
- Highway 72
- Highway 94
- Highway 102
- Highway 112
- Highway 127
- Highway 244
- Highway 264
- Highway 265
- Highway 279
- Highway 303
- Highway 340
- Highway 549
- Highway 642
- Highway 980

The historic Trail of Tears is on US highways 62 and 71 and connects with U.S. Route 412 in nearby Washington County.

=== Airports ===
- Northwest Arkansas National Airport (XNA) is located near Highfill.
- Rogers Municipal Airport (ROG) serves the county and surrounding communities.

=== Rail ===
The Arkansas and Missouri Railroad parallels US Highways 62 and 71 in the county.

The St. Louis–San Francisco Railway (commonly known as the "Frisco") was completed across Benton County in 1881. The Bentonville Railway Company operated a freight and passenger railroad between Rogers and Bentonville between 1883 and 1898.

== Government and politics ==
=== Government ===
The county government is a constitutional body granted specific powers by the Constitution of Arkansas and the Arkansas Code. The quorum court is the legislative branch of the county government and controls all spending and revenue collection. Representatives are called justices of the peace and are elected from county districts every even-numbered year. The number of districts in a county vary from nine to fifteen, and district boundaries are drawn by the county election commission. The Benton County Quorum Court has fifteen members. Presiding over quorum court meetings is the county judge, who serves as the chief operating officer of the county. The county judge is elected at-large and does not vote in quorum court business, although capable of vetoing quorum court decisions.

Benton County, Arkansas elected countywide officials
Position	Officeholder	Party
County Judge	Barry Moehring	Republican
County Clerk	Betsy Harrell	Republican
Circuit Clerk	Brenda DeShields	Republican
Sheriff	Shawn Holloway	Republican
Treasurer	Deanna Ratcliffe	Republican
Collector	Gloria Peterson	Republican
Assessor	Roderick Grieve	Republican
Coroner	Daniel Oxford	Republican

The composition of the Quorum Court following the 2024 elections is 15 Republicans. Justices of the Peace (members) of the Quorum Court following the elections are:

- District 1: Jeff Dunn (R) of Rogers
- District 2: Ken Farmer (R) of Rogers
- District 3: Richard McKeehan (R) of Rogers
- District 4: Mike Miller (R) of Rogers
- District 5: Carrie Perrien Smith (R) of Rogers
- District 6: Brian Armas
- District 7: Joseph Bollinger (R) of Bella Vista
- District 8: Joel Jones (R) of Bentonville
- District 9: Gregory Woodell (R) (position now Vacant)
- District 10: Danny McCrackin (R) of Bella Vista
- District 11: Dustin Todd (R) of Bentonville
- District 12: John Rissler (R) of Siloam Springs
- District 13: Kurt S. Moore (R) of Siloam Springs
- District 14: Bethany Rosenbaum (R) of Lowell
- District 15: Joel Edwards (R) of Centerton

Additionally, the townships of Benton County are entitled to elect their own respective constables, as set forth by the Constitution of Arkansas. Constables are largely of historical significance as they were used to keep the peace in rural areas when travel was more difficult. The township constables as of the 2024 elections are:

- District 1: James Gibson (R)
- District 2: Keith Brummett (R)
- District 3: Stephen Rosser (R)
- District 4: Gordon L. Fisher (R)
- District 5: Steven Walls (R)

=== Politics ===
As is typical of the Ozarks and the Bible Belt, Benton County is strongly Republican. It was one of the first counties in Arkansas to break from the Democratic Solid South, supporting Republicans Herbert Hoover in 1928 and Thomas E. Dewey in 1944. It has not been carried by a Democratic presidential nominee since Harry S. Truman in 1948. Along with nearby Sebastian County, it was one of the few counties in Arkansas to resist the appeal of Southern Democratic "favorite sons" Lyndon B. Johnson, Jimmy Carter, and Arkansas governor Bill Clinton, (Note: Benton County was one of few counties to have voted for Clinton during his gubernatorial campaigns despite him losing it during both his presidential runs. He won the county in all of his successful gubernatorial runs except for 1982 and 1984.) while also voting for Republican Richard Nixon in 1968 as George Wallace won Arkansas on the pro-segregation American Independent Party ticket. Carter, in 1976, remains the last Democrat to win even forty percent of the county's vote.

In Benton County, voters have supported the GOP in the last nineteen presidential elections.

United States presidential election results for Benton County, Arkansas
Year	Republican		Democratic		Third party(ies)	
Year	No.	%	No.	%	No.	%
1892	1,212	29.29%	2,587	62.52%	339	8.19%
1896	685	16.05%	3,548	83.15%	34	0.80%
1900	1,087	26.36%	2,980	72.28%	56	1.36%
1904	1,202	35.08%	1,963	57.30%	261	7.62%
1908	1,527	31.77%	3,067	63.82%	212	4.41%
1912	541	14.05%	2,353	61.12%	956	24.83%
1916	1,293	29.39%	3,106	70.61%	0	0.00%
1920	1,916	39.34%	2,838	58.28%	116	2.38%
1924	1,694	37.04%	2,313	50.58%	566	12.38%
1928	3,248	57.29%	2,348	41.42%	73	1.29%
1932	1,275	24.53%	3,775	72.62%	148	2.85%
1936	1,672	40.64%	2,418	58.77%	24	0.58%
1940	1,962	43.86%	2,442	54.59%	69	1.54%
1944	3,305	53.52%	2,861	46.33%	9	0.15%
1948	2,911	44.70%	3,281	50.38%	321	4.93%
1952	7,916	68.83%	3,558	30.94%	26	0.23%
1956	6,500	63.08%	3,744	36.33%	61	0.59%
1960	7,832	67.58%	3,619	31.23%	139	1.20%
1964	5,977	51.25%	5,655	48.49%	30	0.26%
1968	8,104	49.94%	4,088	25.19%	4,036	24.87%
1972	14,621	77.86%	4,083	21.74%	74	0.39%
1976	12,670	52.75%	11,289	47.00%	61	0.25%
1980	18,830	63.96%	9,231	31.36%	1,379	4.68%
1984	24,296	75.90%	7,306	22.82%	408	1.27%
1988	24,295	71.23%	9,399	27.55%	416	1.22%
1992	21,126	48.81%	15,774	36.45%	6,379	14.74%
1996	23,748	51.89%	17,205	37.59%	4,815	10.52%
2000	34,838	64.94%	17,277	32.21%	1,531	2.85%
2004	46,571	68.37%	20,756	30.47%	794	1.17%
2008	51,124	67.20%	23,331	30.67%	1,618	2.13%
2012	54,646	68.95%	22,636	28.56%	1,975	2.49%
2016	60,871	62.87%	28,005	28.92%	7,948	8.21%
2020	73,965	61.68%	42,249	35.23%	3,698	3.08%
2024	79,907	62.14%	45,231	35.17%	3,457	2.69%

== Communities ==
=== Cities ===
- Bella Vista
- Bentonville (county seat)
- Bethel Heights
- Cave Springs
- Centerton
- Decatur
- Elm Springs (mostly in Washington County)
- Gentry
- Gravette
- Little Flock
- Lowell
- Pea Ridge
- Rogers
- Siloam Springs
- Springdale (mostly in Washington County)
- Sulphur Springs

=== Towns ===
- Avoca
- Garfield
- Gateway
- Highfill
- Springtown

=== Census-designated places ===
- Cherokee City
- Hiwasse (former CDP)
- Lost Bridge Village
- Maysville
- Prairie Creek

=== Townships ===
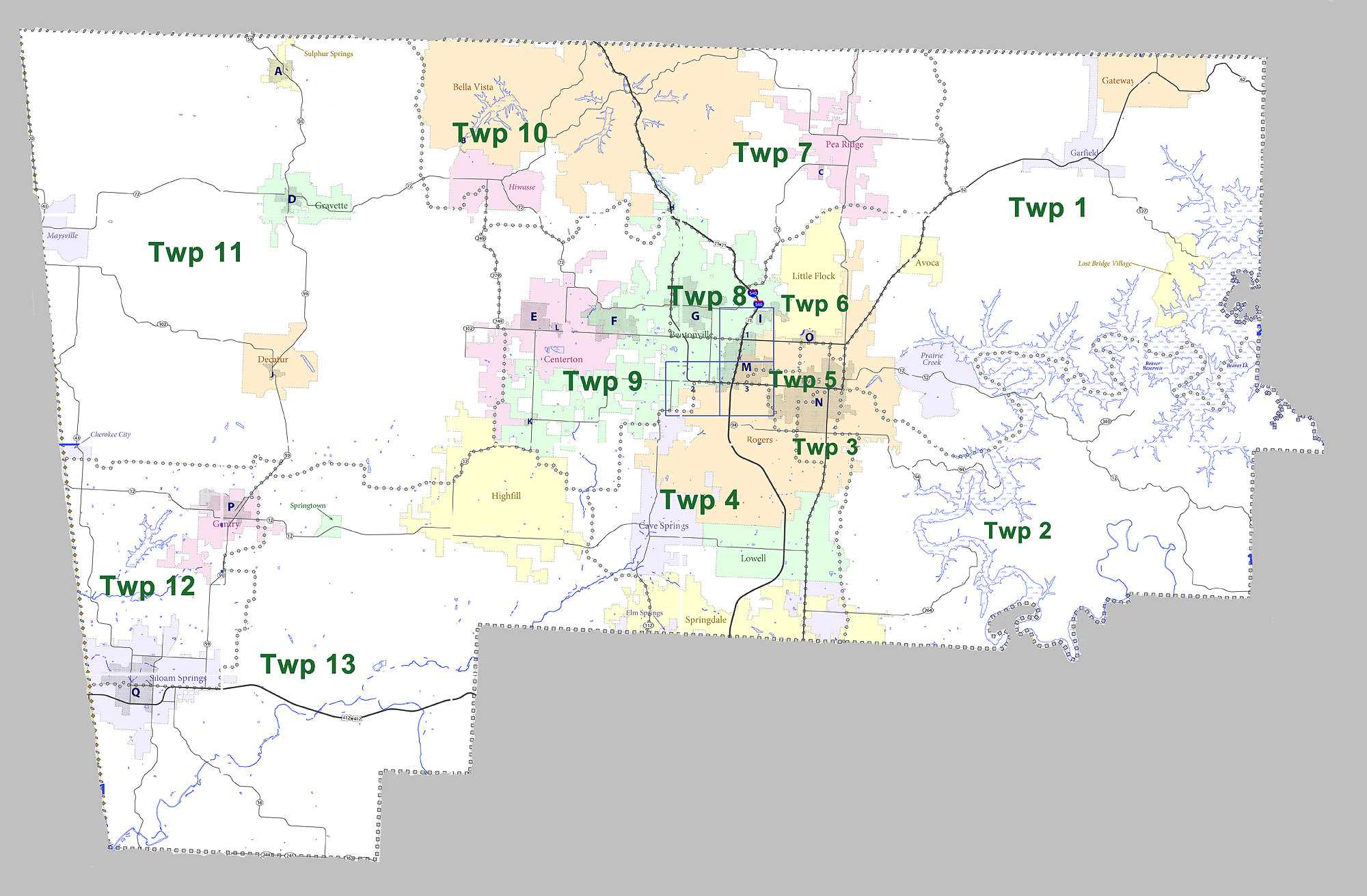
Townships in Benton County, Arkansas as of 2010

Note: Most Arkansas counties have names for their townships. Benton County, however, has numbers instead of names.

Townships in Arkansas are the divisions of a county. Each township includes unincorporated areas; some may have incorporated cities or towns within part of their boundaries. Arkansas townships have limited purposes in modern times. However, the United States census does list Arkansas population based on townships (sometimes referred to as "county subdivisions" or "minor civil divisions"). Townships are also of value for historical purposes in terms of genealogical research. Each town or city is within one or more townships in an Arkansas county based on census maps and publications. The townships of Benton County are listed below; listed in parentheses are the cities, towns, and/or census-designated places that are fully or partially inside the township.

Township	FIPS code	ANSI code (GNIS ID)	Population center(s)	Pop. (2010)	Pop. density (/mi^{2})	Pop. density (/km^{2})	Total area (mi^{2})	Total area (km^{2})	Land area (mi^{2})	Land area (km^{2})	Water area (mi^{2})	Water area (km^{2})	Geographic coordinates
Township 1	05-93626	01989186	all of Garfield, Gateway, Lost Bridge Village, Prairie Creek; parts of Avoca, Rogers	13,223	113.79	43.93	130.964	339.2	116.205	301.0	14.759	38.23	36.412328°N 93.979817°W
Township 2	05-93628	01989194	small parts of Lowell, Rogers, Springdale	14,279	150.33	58.04	111.844	289.7	94.984	246.0	16.860	43.67	36.280449°N 93.983324°W
Township 3	05-93630	01989187	parts of Lowell, Rogers, Springdale; most of Bethel Heights	20,037	1,903.93	735.03	10.572	27.38	10.524	27.26	0.048	0.1243	36.272833°N 94.124961°W
Township 4	05-93632	01989188	all of Cave Springs; most of the following: Lowell, Rogers, Springdale (within Benton County); small parts of Elm Springs	25,596	518.70	200.28	49.693	128.7	49.346	127.8	0.347	0.8987	36.271000°N 94.192603°W
Township 5	05-93634	01989189	part of Rogers	12,792	2,873.32	1,109.45	4.460	11.55	4.452	11.53	0.008	0.02072	36.335732°N 94.140417°W
Township 6	05-93636	01989190	most of Little Flock; almost half of Avoca; small parts of Bentonville, Pea Ridge, Rogers	14,033	671.18	259.15	20.929	54.21	20.908	54.15	0.021	0.05439	36.380291°N 94.128869°W
Township 7	05-93638	01989191	most of Pea Ridge; part of Bella Vista; small part of Bentonville	20,317	331.80	128.10	61.597	159.5	61.233	158.6	0.364	0.9428	36.454130°N 94.153613°W
Township 8	05-93640	01989192	part of Bentonville	12,637	1,575.69	608.43	8.028	20.79	8.020	20.77	0.008	0.02072	36.380199°N 94.200482°W
Township 9	05-93642	01989193	most of Bentonville, Centerton; small part of Highfill	31,362	638.18	246.36	49.497	128.2	49.143	127.3	0.354	0.9169	36.354443°N 94.269172°W
Township 10	05-93644	01989195	most of Bella Vista, Hiwasse	16,402	385.73	148.97	43.848	113.6	42.522	110.1	1.326	3.434	36.453560°N 94.307978°W
Township 11	05-93645	01989196	all of Cherokee City, Decatur, Gravette, Maysville, Sulphur Springs; small parts of Centerton, Highfill, Hiwasse	12,273	59.13	22.83	207.804	538.2	207.558	537.6	0.246	0.6371	36.393573°N 94.468392°W
Township 12	05-93646	01989197	most of Gentry; more than half of Siloam Springs	15,158	361.65	139.58	43.028	111.4	41.913	108.6	1.115	2.888	36.239052°N 94.522847°W
Township 13	05-93647	01989198	all of Springtown; most of Highfill; small parts of Elm Springs, Gentry, Springdale	13,230	94.13	36.35	141.642	366.9	140.548	364.0	1.094	2.833	36.193862°N 94.409806°W
Source: "Census 2010 U.S. Gazetteer Files: County Subdivisions in Arkansas". U.S. Census Bureau, Geography Division. Archived from the original on May 31, 2014. Source: "Census 2010 U.S. Gazetteer Files". U.S. Census Bureau, Geography Division.

== Education ==
School districts include:

- Bentonville Public Schools
- Decatur School District
- Gentry Public Schools
- Gravette School District
- Pea Ridge School District
- Rogers Public Schools
- Siloam Springs Schools
- Springdale School District

== See also ==
- National Register of Historic Places listings in Benton County, Arkansas
- Cooks Venture—former poultry company based in Decatur with a large ordeal around its sudden shutdown
