= Area code 479 =

Telephone area code in northwestern Arkansas

Coordinates: 35°30′N 94°00′W

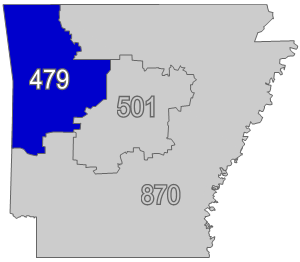

Area code 479 is a telephone area code in the North American Numbering Plan (NANP) in the northwestern part of the U.S. state of Arkansas. The numbering plan area (NPA) comprises thirteen counties and the cities of Bentonville, Fayetteville, Fort Smith, Rogers, Siloam Springs, and Springdale. The area code was created on January 19, 2002, in a split of area code 501.

== Service area ==
Area code 479 serves the counties of Benton, Crawford, Franklin, Johnson, Logan, Madison, Polk, Pope, Scott, Sebastian, Washington and Yell, and parts of Carroll County, the rest being served with area codes 870 and 327.

Arkansas area codes: 479, 501, 870/327
	North: 417	
West: 539/918	479	East: 501, 327/870
	South: 501, 327/870	
Missouri area codes: 314/557, 417, 573/235, 636, 660, 816/975
Oklahoma area codes: 405/572, 580, 918/539
