= Times of Northeast Benton County =

- Type: Weekly newspaper
- Publisher: Northwest Arkansas Newspapers LLC
- Editor: Annette Beard
- Founded: 1913
- Headquarters: Pea Ridge, Arkansas, USA
- Circulation: 1,300-1,400 circulation
- Website: tnebc.nwaonline.com

The Times of Northeast Benton County is a weekly newspaper with a 1,300–1,400 circulation located in Pea Ridge, Arkansas, located in the northeast corner of Benton County. In addition to the city of Pea Ridge, the newspaper covers the communities of Little Flock to the south, Avoca and Brightwater to the southeast, Garfield, Lost Bridge and Gateway to the east, and historically — though intermittently in recent years — Jacket and Mountain to the north in Missouri. Annette Beard, a resident of the area for more than 30 years, is the current managing editor of the newspaper.

== History ==
The Times of Northeast Benton County is not the first newspaper to serve the Pea Ridge area, though it is the most successful and only existing one. The first recorded newspaper in Pea Ridge was The Advertiser, which was started by I.H. Baxter in 1905 and stayed in business nearly one year. The next newspaper was The Pea Ridge Pod, which was founded by an English immigrant named William Beck (1877–1948) in 1913. This newspaper was noted for its name and excerpts from it were used for the "Pickled Pods" column in the New York Times. For the first two years this paper operated out of Pea Ridge, but was moved to Siloam Springs in its third year and then folded.

The newspaper that would become the Times was first published on January 6, 1966, by James (Jim) and Margie Edgmon as the Pea Ridge Graphic out of their home in Springdale, Arkansas. The newspaper was purchased from the Edgmons in 1967 by Earle and Billie Jines. In 1972, the Jines merged the newspaper with the Cave Springs Scene, which they had started in nearby Cave Springs, Arkansas in 1970, and created the Pea Ridge Graphic-Scene, with the first issue carrying the new name appearing on December 7, 1972. By 1980, the Jines had sold the newspaper to Jack and Mary-Lou Beisner, who renamed it the Pea Ridge Country Times, to better reflect the coverage the newspaper gave to surrounding communities. The Beisners again changed the name of the newspaper, starting with the February 3, 1982 issue, to the Times of Pea Ridge Country. Even after divesting her ownership in the newspaper, Billie Jines continued to contribute articles and columns to it and was largely seen as the preeminent local historian until her death in 2003.

By the late 1980s, Mike and Barbara Freeman had purchased the newspaper and operated it through most of the 1990s before selling it to Stephens Media LLC, which in 2009 merged its northwest Arkansas papers with those of Arkansas Democrat-Gazette Inc. to form Northwest Arkansas Newspapers LLC, the current owner of the Times of Northeast Benton County. It was under the ownership of Stephens Media LLC that the paper acquired its current name.

== Rural Correspondents ==
For the first 30 years of its existence the newspaper depended heavily on rural correspondents from the local communities to fill its pages. Typically not having any formal journalistic training, these correspondents provided folksy weekly columns on the events and people of their communities. Because of these slice-of-life essays, it was often common knowledge who had bought a new vehicle, moved, went on vacation or had a baby. For years, former Pea Ridge Mayor Mary Rogers Durand wrote on the comings and goings of Pea Ridge proper, while Pearl Patterson covered the details of country living in the Mountain and Jacket community and others did the same for the Little Flock, Garfield and Brightwater communities. By the late 1990s these columns had started to become scarcer and scarcer in the newspaper, dwindling to just a few in its current incarnation.
