= Arkansas Communication and Theatre Arts Association =

Education organization in Arkansas, United States

Arkansas Communication and Theatre Arts Association (ACTAA) is a non-profit professional organization serving educators and students of oral communication, debate, forensics, theatre arts, and dance the U.S. state of Arkansas.

== National Forensic League Arkansas District ==
Formed in 2011–12 school year, the National Forensic League (NFL) approved the creation of the Arkansas NFL District (No. 109) and its 13 charter schools to this forensics honor society.

=== Member schools ===
- Fayetteville High School
- Bentonville High School
- Cabot High School
- Little Rock Central High School
- Rogers Heritage High School
- Monticello High School
- Hall High School
- Omaha High School
- Rogers High School
- North Pulaski High School
- Jonesboro High School
- Bell Academy (Rogers, Arkansas)
- Cedarville High School
- North Little Rock High School (West Campus)
- North Little Rock High School (East Campus)
- Heber Springs High School
- Russellville High School
- Central Arkansas Christian Schools

In 2012–13, Episcopal Collegiate School gained membership to the Arkansas NFL District.

=== Sweepstakes awards ===
District awards will be given in congress, debate, and speech divisions . In addition to the overall district sweepstakes award, as listed below:

- 2012–13:
  - 1st Place: Bentonville HS
  - 2nd place: Monticello HS
  - 3rd place: Fayetteville HS

== See also ==
- Arkansas Activities Association
