= Markey House =

Historic house in Arkansas, United States

- Formerly listed on the U.S. National Register of Historic Places
- Location within Arkansas Location within the United States
- Nearest city: Garfield, Arkansas
- Coordinates: 36°25′39″N 93°57′16″W
- Area: less than one acre
- Built: 1880
- Architectural style: Log Cabin
- MPS: Benton County MRA
- NRHP reference No.: 87002354

Significant dates
- Added to NRHP: January 28, 1988
- Removed from NRHP: October 14, 2026

The Markey House is a historic log house in rural eastern Benton County, Arkansas. It is located on County Road 99, southeast of Garfield. It is a single-story T-shaped log structure, built in 1880 and moved to its present location in 1960. It was located on land that became part of the Pea Ridge National Military Park, and was sold by the National Park Service. It is one of the least-altered and best-preserved log buildings in the county.

The house was listed on the National Register of Historic Places in 1988.

== See also ==
- National Register of Historic Places listings in Benton County, Arkansas
