= Springfield to Fayetteville Road-Elkhorn Tavern Segment =

- U.S. National Register of Historic Places
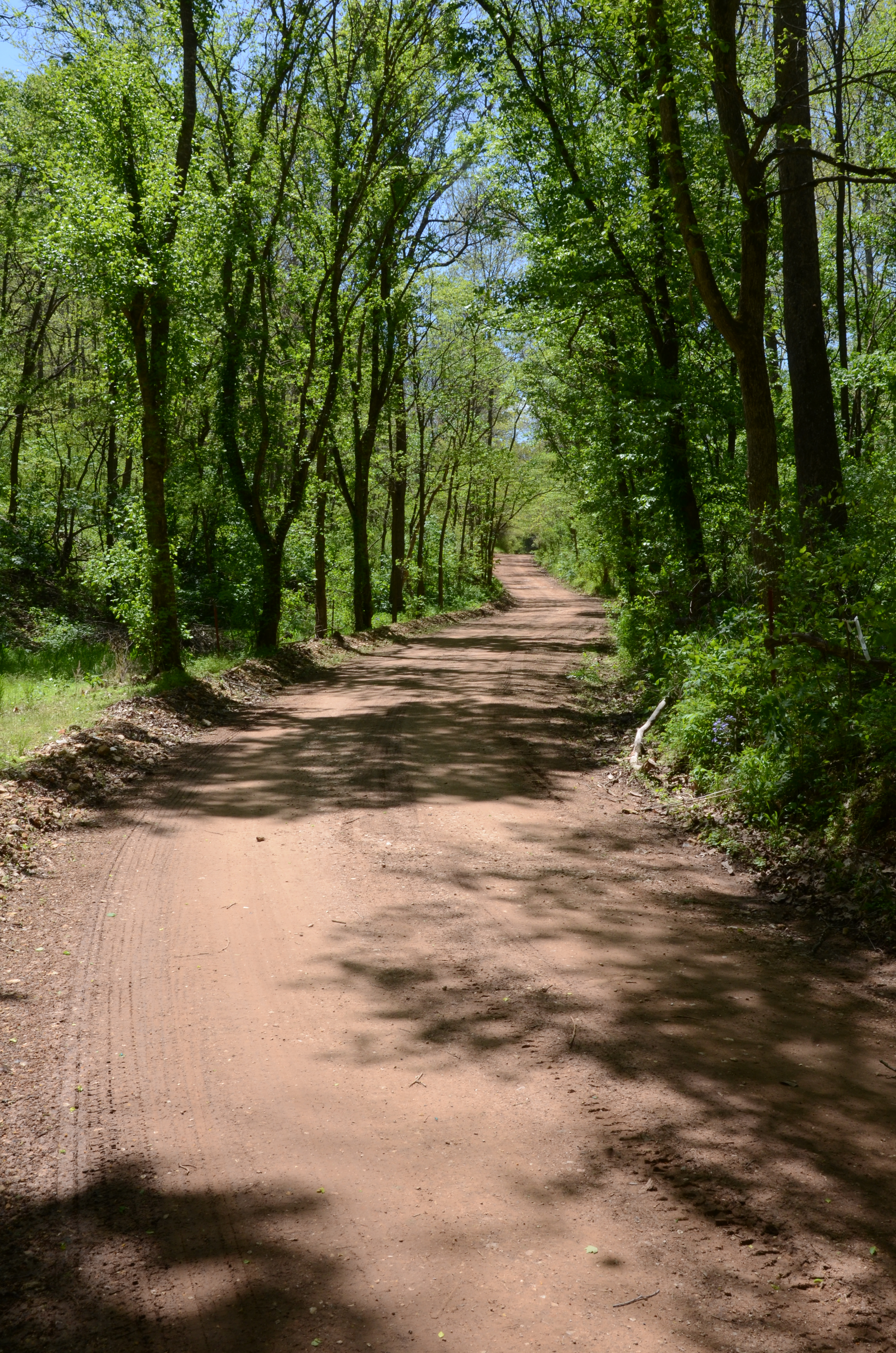

- Location within Arkansas Location within the United States
- Nearest city: Garfield, Arkansas
- Coordinates: 36°28′7″N 94°0′41″W
- Area: 1 acre (0.40 ha)
- Built: 1837
- MPS: Cherokee Trail of Tears MPS
- NRHP reference No.: 05000484
- Added to NRHP: May 26, 2005

The Springfield to Fayetteville Road-Elkhorn Tavern Segment is a section of historic 19th-century roadway in Pea Ridge National Military Park in northwestern Arkansas. It is a dirt road, about 1 mile (1.6 km) long and 18 to 20 feet (5.5 to 6.1 m) wide, that was built in 1835. The first major road through northwestern Arkansas, it connected Fayetteville, Arkansas with Springfield, Missouri. The road was part of the major northern route of the Trail of Tears, the forcible remove in the late 1830s of Native Americans from east of the Mississippi River to what is now Oklahoma. The road was also actively used by both Union and Confederate forces during the American Civil War, and was the major route of advance by Confederate forces leading to the Battle of Pea Ridge, whose battlefield is preserved by the park.

The road segment was listed on the National Register of Historic Places in 2005.

== See also ==
- National Register of Historic Places listings in Benton County, Arkansas
- Springfield to Fayetteville Road-Cross Hollow Segment
