= Pea Ridge, Arkansas =

City in Arkansas

- City
- City of Pea Ridge
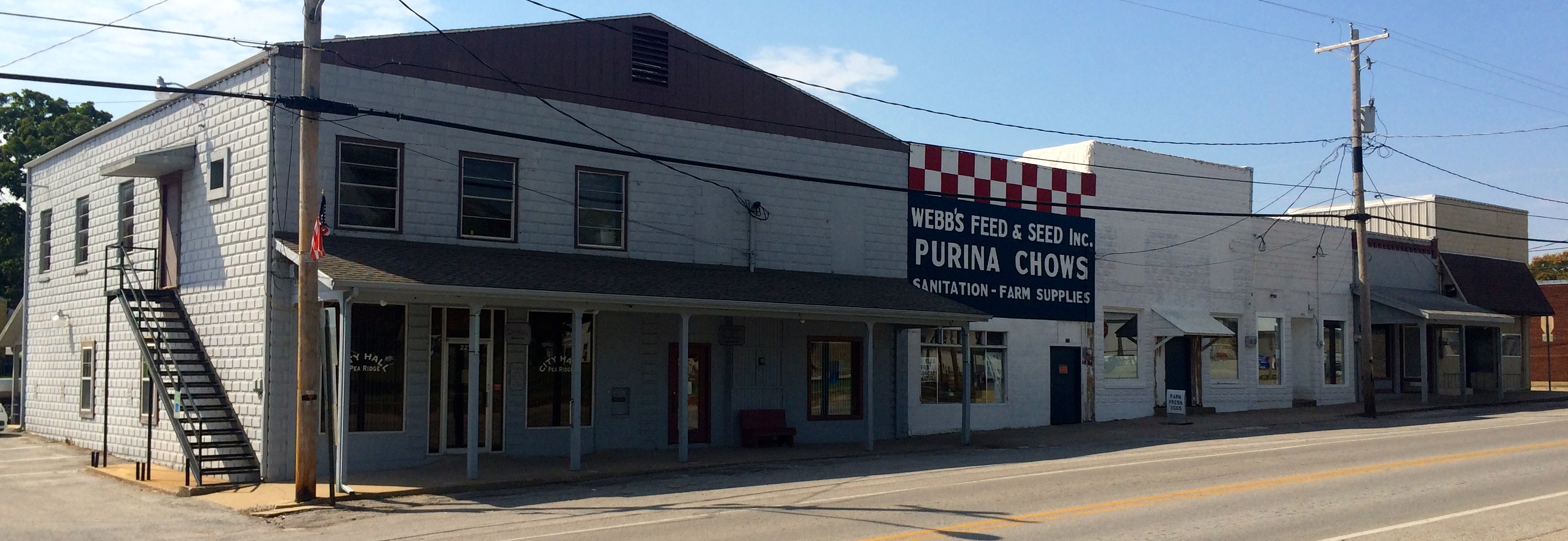
- Pea Ridge Commercial Historic District

- Logo
- Motto: "Life's Better on the Ridge"
- Location of Pea Ridge in Benton County, Arkansas.
- Coordinates: 36°26′58″N 94°07′20″W
- Country: United States
- State: Arkansas
- County: Benton

Government
  - Mayor: Nathan See

Area
  - Total: 7.58 sq mi (19.64 km^{2})
  - Land: 7.58 sq mi (19.64 km^{2})
  - Water: 0 sq mi (0.00 km^{2})
- Elevation: 1,312 ft (400 m)

Population (2020)
  - Total: 6,559
  - Estimate (2025): 11,233 ▲
  - Density: 864.9/sq mi (333.94/km^{2})
- Time zone: UTC-6 (Central (CST))
  - Summer (DST): UTC-5 (CDT)
- ZIP code: 72751
- Area code: 479
- FIPS code: 05-54200
- GNIS feature ID: 2404492
- Website: cityofpearidgear.gov

Pea Ridge is a city in Benton County, Arkansas, United States. The name Pea Ridge is derived from a combination of the physical location of the original settlement of the town, across the crest of a ridge of the Ozark Mountains, and for the hog peanuts or turkey peas that had been originally cultivated by Native American tribes centuries before European settlement, which later helped to provide basic subsistence once those pioneer settlers arrived.

The rural town is best known as the location of the pivotal American Civil War engagement the Battle of Pea Ridge, or, as it is locally known, the Battle of Elkhorn Tavern, which took place approximately 5 miles (8 km) east of the town. The site of the battle is preserved as the Pea Ridge National Military Park.

The town's downtown business district is on the National Register of Historic Places and largely comprises commercial structures from the late 19th and early 20th centuries. The population of Pea Ridge was 6,559 as of the 2020 census. It is part of the Northwest Arkansas region. The local weekly newspaper is the Times of Northeast Benton County.

== Geography ==
Arkansas Highway 94 is the main road through the city, leading south 8 miles (13 km) to the center of Rogers and northwest 6 miles (10 km) to the Missouri border. Arkansas Highway 72 leads east 5 miles (8 km) to U.S. Route 62 at Pea Ridge National Military Park, and southwest 9 miles (14 km) to Bentonville.

According to the United States Census Bureau, the city has a total area of 7.4 square miles (19.1 km^{2}), all land.

=== Metropolitan area ===
The Northwest Arkansas region consists of three Arkansas counties: Benton, Madison, and Washington. The area had a population of 347,045 at the 2000 census which had increased to 463,204 by the 2010 census (an increase of 33.47 percent), and further increased to 546,725 by the 2020 census. The Metropolitan Statistical Area does not consist of the usual principal-city-with-suburbs morphology; instead Pea Ridge is bordered to the south by Rogers and Little Flock, the west by Bella Vista, and touches the Missouri state line to the north. For more than the last decade, Northwest Arkansas has been one of the fastest-growing regions in the United States.

== Demographics ==
Historical population
Census	Pop.	Note	%±
1940	72		—
1950	268		272.2%
1960	380		41.8%
1970	1,088		186.3%
1980	1,488		36.8%
1990	1,620		8.9%
2000	2,346		44.8%
2010	4,794		104.3%
2020	6,559		36.8%
2025 (est.)	11,233	▲	71.3%
U.S. Decennial Census

=== 2020 census ===
As of the 2020 census, Pea Ridge had a population of 6,559. The median age was 33.5 years. 30.1% of residents were under the age of 18 and 12.2% were 65 years of age or older. For every 100 females, there were 100.2 males, and for every 100 females age 18 and over, there were 94.8 males age 18 and over.

There were 2,279 households and 1,455 families in Pea Ridge. Of all households, 43.3% had children under the age of 18 living in them, 59.7% were married-couple households, 13.8% were households with a male householder and no spouse or partner present, and 21.1% were households with a female householder and no spouse or partner present. About 18.7% of all households were made up of individuals, and 9.2% had someone living alone who was 65 years of age or older.

There were 2,393 housing units, of which 4.8% were vacant. The homeowner vacancy rate was 0.9% and the rental vacancy rate was 6.6%.

89.6% of residents lived in urban areas, while 10.4% lived in rural areas.

Pea Ridge racial composition
Race	Number	Percentage
White (non-Hispanic)	5,444	83.0%
Black or African American (non-Hispanic)	55	0.84%
Native American	59	0.9%
Asian	39	0.59%
Pacific Islander	4	0.06%
Other/Mixed	437	6.66%
Hispanic or Latino	521	7.94%

=== 2010 census ===
As of the 2010 Census, Pea Ridge had a population of 4,794. The racial and ethnic composition of the population was 90.7% white, 0.7% African American, 0.9% Native American, 0.3% Asian, 2.0% from two or more races and 5.8% Hispanic or Latino.

There were 1300 households, out of which 37.3% had children under the age of 18 living with them, 63.3% were married couples living together, 7.8% had a female householder with no husband present, and 24.1% were non-families. 21.6% of all households were made up of individuals, and 12.0% had someone living alone who was 65 years of age or older. The average household size was 2.63 and the average family size was 3.05.

In the city, the population was spread out, with 26.9% under the age of 18, 6.9% from 18 to 24, 29.5% from 25 to 44, 21.6% from 45 to 64, and 15.1% who were 65 years of age or older. The median age was 36 years. For every 100 females, there were 95.7 males. For every 100 females age 18 and over, there were 93.5 males.

The median income for a household in the city was $37,244, and the median income for a family was $42,222. Males had a median income of $29,340 versus $21,298 for females. The per capita income for the city was $15,149. 7.7% of the population and 6.0% of families were below the poverty line. Out of the total population, 9.9% of those under the age of 18 and 7.6% of those 65 and older were living below the poverty line.

== Education ==
Most of Pea Ridge is zoned to the Pea Ridge School District. A small section is zoned to Rogers Public Schools. Pea Ridge High School is the comprehensive high school of the former.

== Image gallery ==
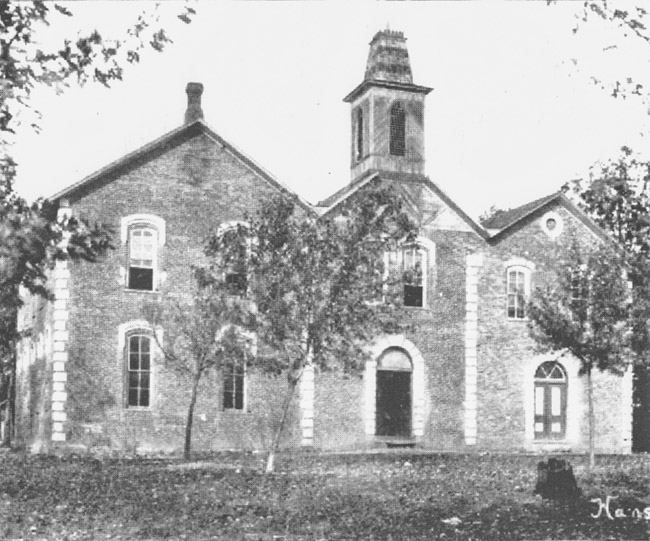
The 1880 Pea Ridge Masonic College building as it appeared in 1920, about ten years before it was razed

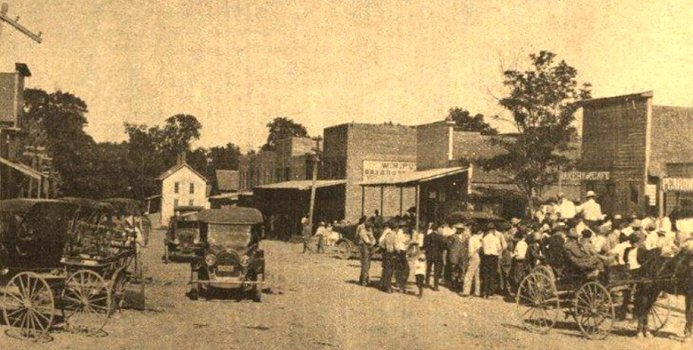
Downtown Pea Ridge looking east on Pickens Road in 1914. The white structure at the end of the street was a hotel operated by the Martin family, which burned down around 1920.

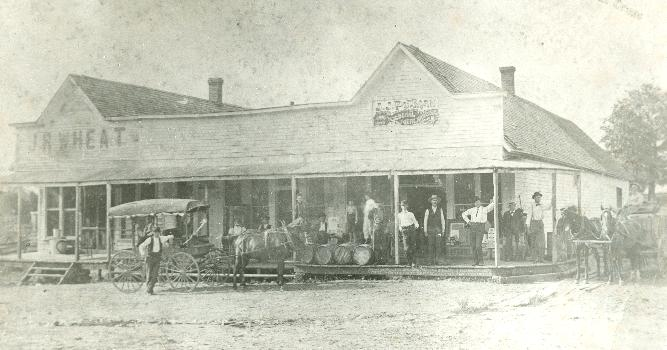
The original J.J. Putnam's general merchandise store, which later burned down and was replaced with a cement block building, which still stands on the southeast corner of Pickens Road and Curtis Avenue. This photo antedates 1914.

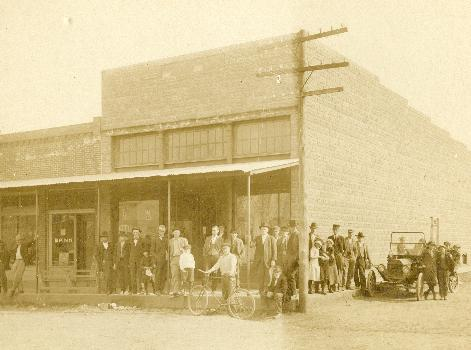
The cement block building that replaced J.J. Putnam's first general merchandise store, which burned, on the southeast corner of Pickens Road and Curtis Avenue in 1914.

== Notable people ==
- Grant Hardin, convicted murderer and escapee, nicknamed "Devil in the Ozarks", grew up in Pea Ridge
- Hugh Miser, American geologist, with the miserite mineral named after him.
- Pea Ridge Day, champion Arkansas hog-caller and right-handed pitcher in Major League Baseball.

== See also ==
- Battle of Pea Ridge
