= Bentonville West High School =

Public school in Arkansas, United States

Location
- 1351 Gamble Road; Centerton, Arkansas; United States; 36.3776°N 94.2970°W

Information
- Type: Public
- Established: 2016
- School district: Bentonville School District
- Principal: Jonathon Guthrie (2016- present)
- Staff: Assistant Principals: Sarah Merayo, Nolan Moyer
- Grades: 9-12
- Age range: 13-19
- Enrollment: 2,661 (2026-2027)
- Student to teacher ratio: 13.14
- Campus type: Suburban
- Color
- Team name: Wolverines
- Publication: The Yawp Literary Magazine
- Website: bwhs.bentonvillek12.org

Bentonville West High School is a public high school for students in grades nine through twelve located in Centerton, Arkansas. Founded in 2016, with a current enrollment of 2,158 students (2021-2022), Bentonville West High School is one of the two high schools in Bentonville School District. The school includes a football stadium that cost about $3.7 million to build.

Communities zoned to Bentonville West High include: much of north-east Bentonville, much of Centerton and Highfill, and small portions of Cave Springs and Rogers.

== School history ==
For approximately 140 years, Bentonville High School served as the only high school within Bentonville. As the city and school populations both grew, BHS moved to its next site on Tiger Boulevard in the building that eventually became Lincoln Junior High School. In 2000, BHS moved to its current location on J Street in Bentonville. The school population continued to grow rapidly until maintaining one high school was no longer feasible. In 2013, the taxpayers in the Bentonville School District voted to allocate around $80 million for a second high school. Bentonville West High School held its grand opening on July 29, 2016. In 2015, the school board named the school and chose Navy Blue and Vegas Gold as the school’s official colors and the Wolverine was selected as the school mascot. Jonathon Guthrie was selected the school’s first principal in the spring of 2015, where he oversaw the staffing process, furniture bids, and other details as the 430,000 square foot facility neared completion. The initial enrollment was approximately 1,250 students. In 2024, the school opened two new wings to allow for additional space due to the increased enrollment.

== Sports teams and Extracurriculars offered ==
Bentonville West offers a wide variety of sports and Extracurricular activities to students who would like to go above and beyond the limits of the classroom. These activities and teams include but are not limited to:

1. Football
2. Baseball/Softball
3. Cross Country Running
4. Track and Field
5. Mountain Biking
6. Bowling
7. Cheer/Dance
8. Soccer
9. Navy JROTC
  1. Bentonville West High School operates a subdivision of the Bentonville School's Navy JROTC program. Bentonville West High School has approximately 70 kids in participation with the program as of March 21, 2025.
10. E-Sports
11. The Midnight Regiment Marching Band
12. Variety of student led clubs and organizations (e.g. SkillsUSA, FBLA, etc.)

== Midnight Regiment Marching Band ==
The Midnight Regiment Marching Band is the official marching band of Bentonville West. In the 2024 marching season, they won 6th place at the Owasso Marching Invitational, 3rd place in finals at the Bentonville Marching Invitational, 12th place at the Bands of America St. Louis Marching Invitational, and making Division 1 Superior rating’s at both the Arkansas School Band And Orchestra Association Region 6 Marching Assessment and the Arkansas School Band And Orchestra Association State Marching Contest with their show “Reflections.”
