= Elkhorn Tavern =

- U.S. Historic district – Contributing property
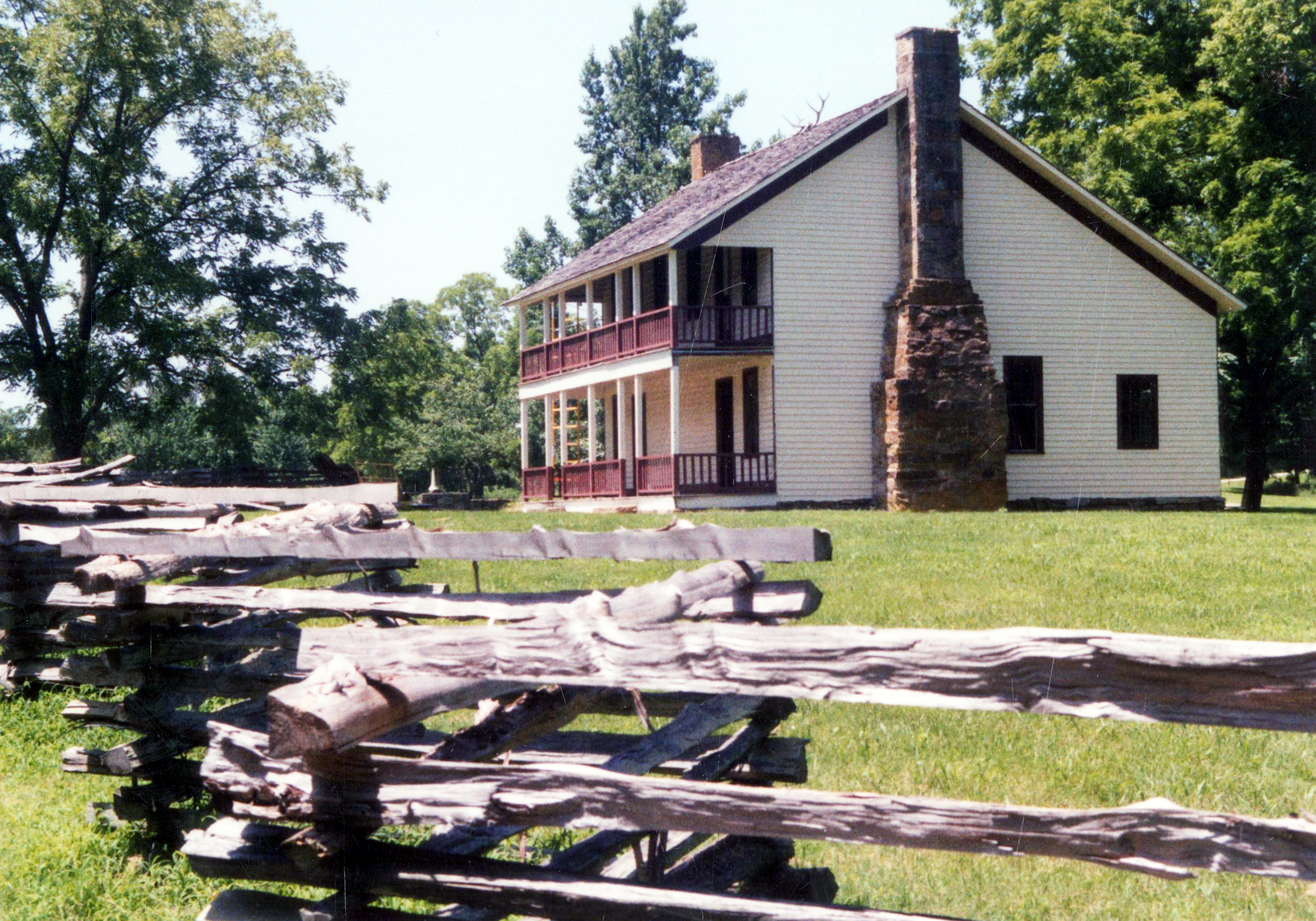
- Elkhorn Tavern, center of day two's fighting

- Location within Arkansas Location within the United States
- Location: US 62, Pea Ridge, Arkansas
- Coordinates: 36°27′13″N 94°00′57″W
- Part of: Pea Ridge National Military Park (ID66000199)
- Added to NRHP: October 15, 1966

Elkhorn Tavern is a two-story, wood-frame structure that served as a physical center for the American Civil War Battle of Pea Ridge, also known as the Battle of Elkhorn Tavern, which was fought on March 7 and March 8, 1862, approximately five miles east of Pea Ridge, Arkansas, located in the northeastern Benton County, Arkansas. The tavern, a replica built in 1865 following the burning of the original building by bushwhackers, is now the centerpiece of the Pea Ridge National Military Park, which includes approximately 5,000 acres (2,000 ha) around the structure, including the restored battlefields, a stretch of the pre-war Telegraph Road, which runs directly in front of the tavern, and a section of the Trail of Tears. The tavern is on the National Register of Historic Places.

== Before the war ==
The first Elkhorn Tavern was built about 1833 by William Ruddick and his son-in-law Samuel Burks, and was first known as Ruddick Inn. It was from this tavern that the two families, between 1837 and 1839, watched a portion of the forced Indian migration across the northern course of the Trail of Tears. An early detachment of 336 Cherokees camped near Ruddick Inn on December 23, 1837. By 1839 more than 11,000 Indians had passed the tavern.

Following the deaths of William and Betsey Ruddick, Burks became sole proprietor in 1852. In 1858, he sold the house and the 313 acres (127 ha) to his cousins Jesse and Polly Cox for $3600. It was Cox who later renamed it Elkhorn Tavern. Under Cox's management, the structure served as a trading post, an unofficial Butterfield Overland Mail stop, post office, voting place, eating establishment, church of the Benton County Baptist Society, and inn. As the war moved near, Jesse Cox left the tavern to the care of his son and daughter-in-law Joseph and Lucinda Pratt Cox and went to Kansas.

== During the Battle of Elkhorn Tavern/Pea Ridge ==
When the fighting around the tavern began, the Cox family (Joseph and Lucinda Cox, along with Joseph's mother, Polly) did not leave their home. They grabbed only a few necessities for survival and retreated to the building's cellar. The family remained in the cellar for three days and nights, March 7–9, 1862, as the battle was waged above them. The upper floors of the tavern served as a makeshift hospital for wounded troops, many undergoing surgery and amputations with no anesthetic, and for a short time served as Confederate General Earl Van Dorn's headquarters. The tavern was hit many times by gunfire during the battle, including a cannonball that tore through the second floor, but the building remained standing.

When the fighting finally subsided on March 9, 1862, the scene around the tavern was one of devastation, with the bodies of men and horses scattered across the battlefield and even the trees surrounding the property broken and scarred by the fighting.

== After the battle ==
Following the battle, the Cox family temporarily moved a short distance from the tavern, in order to complete and repair the structure, and clean the surrounding area before moving back. It was during this absence that bushwhackers struck, burning the tavern to the ground in January 1863.

Since the original building's foundation and chimneys were still in good shape, the Cox family rebuilt on the original foundation and chimneys. The new building was completed in 1865.

== A National Park ==
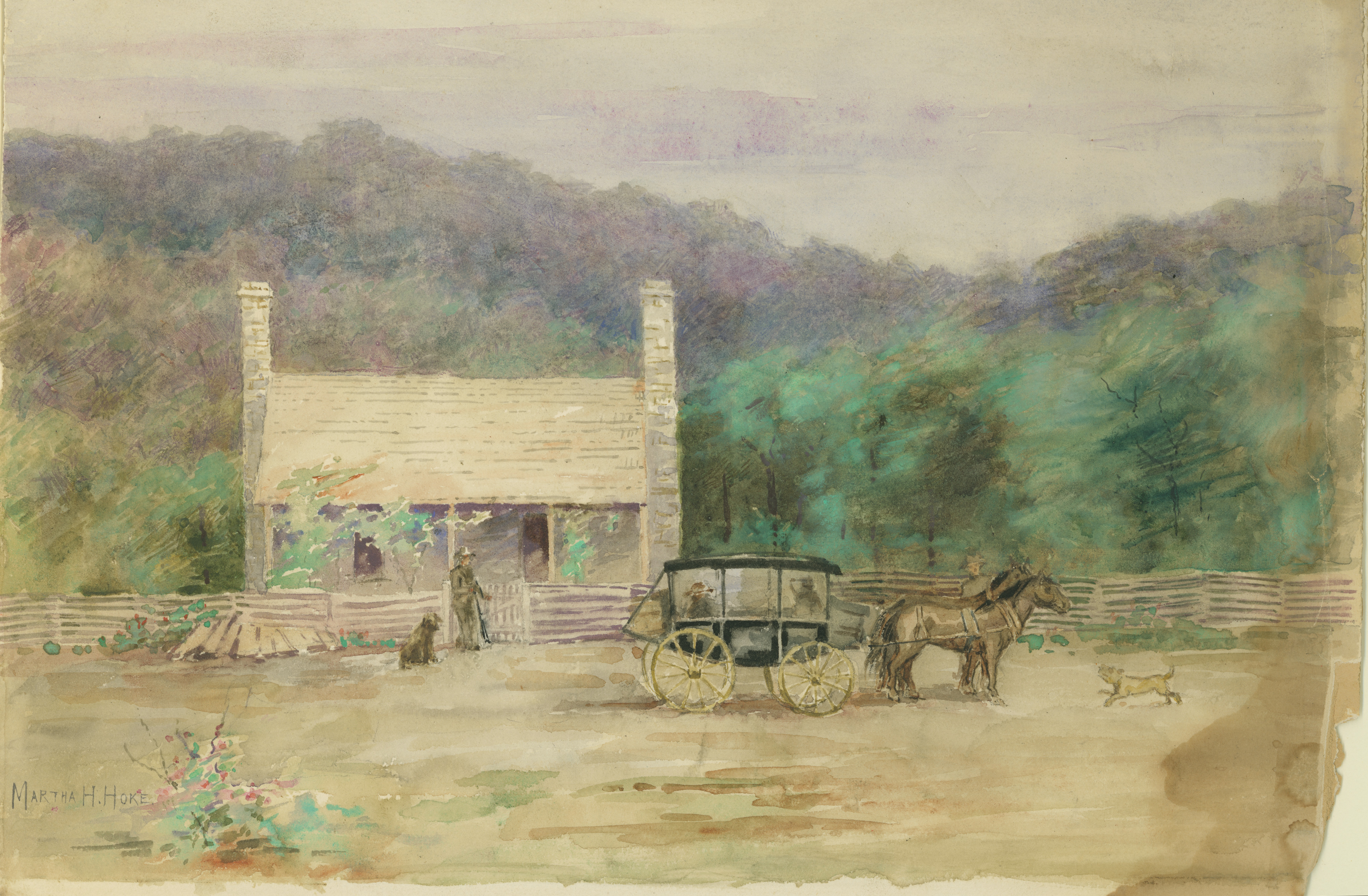
Elkhorn Tavern, 1887

Elkhorn Tavern remained in the Cox family for nearly a century following the war, with Frances Cox Scot, who was born in the tavern in 1865, inheriting the building after the deaths of her father and mother, Joseph and Lucinda Cox, in 1903 and 1902 respectively. Scot lived and even ran a small Civil War museum in the tavern until 1959, when it was purchased to become part of the newly created Pea Ridge National Military Park. Following the sale, Scot moved to nearby Garfield, Arkansas and died the following year at the age of 95.

Once the property was purchased for the Pea Ridge National Military Park, the tavern was renovated to make it more closely resemble the structure from 1862. Today, Elkhorn Tavern is open to visitors from fall to spring, with costumed volunteers giving a lesson on the history and culture of the site and its former residents.

== The Elkhorn name ==
The name for the tavern came from a carpenter who, on his way to the tavern, shot an elk about a quarter mile from the building. He removed the horns and gave them to Jesse Cox, who originally placed them on a pole, but later situated them on the roof ridge between the chimneys. An early set of elk antlers are on display inside the tavern building, though the park routinely replaces the set placed on the roof of the building when they become damaged by the weather or animals.

== See also ==
- List of the oldest buildings in Arkansas
