= Ryan Hale =

American football player (born 1975)

No. 93
- Position: Defensive tackle

Personal information
- Born: July 10, 1975 (age 51); Rogers, Arkansas, U.S.
- Listed height: 6 ft 4 in (1.93 m)
- Listed weight: 300 lb (136 kg)

Career information
- High school: Rogers
- College: Arkansas (1994–1998)
- NFL draft: 1999: 7th round, 225th overall pick

Career history
- New York Giants (1999–2000)
- Stats at Pro Football Reference

Ryan Hale (born July 10, 1975) is an American former professional football defensive tackle who played two seasons with the New York Giants of the National Football League (NFL). He was selected by the Giants in the seventh round of the 1999 NFL draft after playing college football at the University of Arkansas.

== Early life and college ==
Ryan Hale was born on July 10, 1975, in Rogers, Arkansas. He attended Rogers High School in Rogers.

Hale played college football for the Arkansas Razorbacks of the University of Arkansas. He was redshirted in 1994 and was a four-year letterman from 1995 to 1998.

== Professional career ==
Hale was selected by the New York Giants in the seventh round, with the 225th overall pick, of the 1999 NFL draft. He officially signed with the team on July 29. He played in nine games for the Giants during the 1999 season, recording three solo tackles and one pass breakup. Hale appeared in all 16 games in 2000, totaling 11 solo tackles and one assisted tackle. He also played in two playoff games that year, posting one solo tackle and one sack. He was released by the Giants on September 2, 2001.

== Personal life ==
Hale later became the founder and CEO of LaneShift, a company that creates bicycle and pedestrian networks.
