= Pea Ridge Pod =

The Pea Ridge Pod
- Type: Weekly newspaper
- Founder: William F. Beck
- Editor: William F. Beck
- Founded: 1913
- Ceased publication: 1917
- Language: English

The Pea Ridge Pod was a newspaper established in Pea Ridge, Arkansas in 1913 by William F. Beck (1860-1930). Though the newspaper's publishing schedule, whether it was weekly, biweekly, or monthly, is undetermined, it was typically only a few pages in size, as the local population at the time was only a few hundred people. But despite its humble circumstances, the Pea Ridge Pod gained national prominence due to its witty and folksy take on rural life. Along with praise for the publication's whimsical name, copy from its pages would go on to be highlighted in publications across the nation, including The New York Times, The Christian Science Monitor, Atlanta Constitution, and Oakland Tribune.

== History ==
The Pea Ridge Pod was the second newspaper to be founded in the town, which is known as the location of the Civil War engagement of the Battle of Pea Ridge. The first periodical in the town was the Pea Ridge Advertiser, which was founded in 1905 by I.H. Baxter and lasted a year before folding. From the beginning, the Pea Ridge Pod took a nontraditional approach to its writing and its publicity, as the Neosho Times newspaper in Neosho, Missouri referenced a visit by William Beck to that city in August 1913, where Beck told them that on his trip up by buggy, which took him through Powell, Missouri and Stella, Missouri, he nailed placards to trees advertising his newspaper. And Beck's opinion of the importance of his paper was even shared by The New York Times, if tongue-in-cheek, which declared that “But the one and only Pod grows at Pea Ridge, and it is full of local news, those little glimpses of country, people and places so interesting to the urbanite, even amid the congestion of his own local news.” The Times went on to say “A humor is shown by the presences on The Pod’s editorial page of news and editorial comment, slyly and with seeming innocence placed in a collection that must be ironical.”

Despite the popularity of the quips and prose from the paper in other publications across the country, the meager local population made it difficult for the business to stay afloat. By 1916, Beck had moved it to Siloam Springs, Arkansas to take advantage of a larger readership. And for a time he considered renaming it, though in the end he did not, as one reader urged against the change by declaring that "no could see that funny name without wishing to see the paper." The newspaper finally folded in the early half of 1917, with Howard Ogg (1894-1944) purchasing the printing operation from Beck and starting the Siloam Springs Advertiser, which itself was closed by 1920.

About a year after the Pea Ridge Pod had folded, at least one more reference was made of its particular style. With the Ohio State Journal declaring, "Not infrequently we have told things so often and so emphatically that we finally got to believing them ourself [sic] and quite likely the Chicago Tribune by this time really thinks it is the world’s greatest newspaper, especially since The Pea Ridge Pod seems to have discontinued publication."

== National Attention ==
Witty and homespun snippets from the Pea Ridge Pod showed up as far away as Alaska and in doing so offered praise and occasionally chastisement for the newspaper's unfiltered content.

- Every Reason to Refuse Him − If a man rides up to you in a hurry and yells for a bottle of whiskey for his mother-in-law, who has just been snake bitten, don’t give it to him, for if you do you will have to go to the penitentiary for a year. Anyway, no man would want his mother-in-law to get well of snake bite, and in second place coal oil is the proper remedy for snake bites now. − Republished in the Sheboygan (Wisconsin) Press
- We Think So, Too − After you get down in the valley beneath the bluffs of Ballard Creek at the depot it is so crooked that you have to cross it twice to get on the other side of it, and then you find yourself on the same side you started from. − Republished in the Austin American
- An Advertisement − If there be earthly thing which you wish to barter, trade or swap, whether a one-eyed mule, a bag of beans or a bakery shop, advertise here in the columns of the Pod and you have made your trade quicker than a goat his tail can nod. − Republished in the Daily Ardmoreite
- Good Advice, but Hard to Follow − Always remember that the other fellow is not interested in your likes or dislikes. − Republished in the Clinton Daily Clintonian
- Juvenile Preparedness − The editor of the Pea Ridge Pod tells of an eight-year-old boy who “is a great believer in preparedness.” He came home late the other night, and anticipating a licking, he made a bee line for the barn, secured an old gunny sack, folded it all up nicely, making several thicknesses and placing it where the lick would fall. That boy has a great future. − Republished in the Atlanta Constitution
- Beating the Undertaker − Some men think they are living when they are but chunks of meat walking around beating some honest hard-working undertaker out of a job. − Republished in the Clinton Saturday Argus
- We Have Not Seen the Editor − A lady friend in a nearby town remarked to the editor the other day, that a new dress would help the appearance of The Pod. Yes, it would and a new suite of clothes would improve the appearance of the editor. − Republished in the Fairbanks Daily News-Miner
