= Springfield to Fayetteville Road-Cross Hollow Segment =

- U.S. National Register of Historic Places
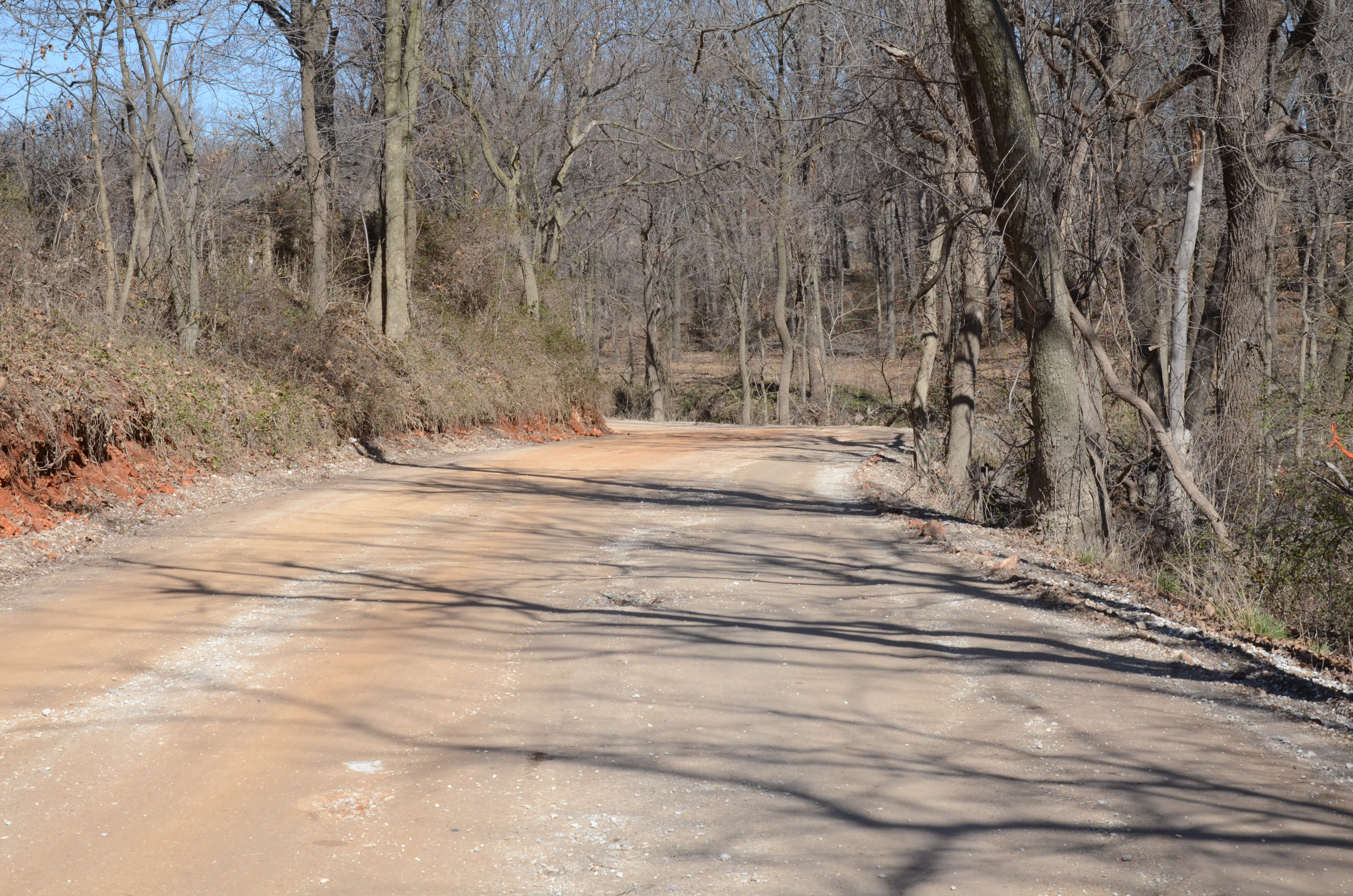

- Location within Arkansas Location within the United States
- Nearest city: Lowell, Arkansas
- Coordinates: 36°15′54″N 94°7′3″W
- Area: 9.9 acres (4.0 ha)
- Built: 1837
- MPS: Cherokee Trail of Tears MPS
- NRHP reference No.: 04001511
- Added to NRHP: January 19, 2005

The Springfield to Fayetteville Road-Cross Hollow Segment is a 2-mile (3.2 km) section of a historic 19th-century road in Benton County, Arkansas. The road is now designated Old Wire Road, and the historic segment runs northward from its junction with County Road 620, northeast of Lowell. This road bed is a part of one of the first roads built in the area, running from Fayetteville, Arkansas to Springfield, Missouri. Built in 1835, the road bed has its original width (about 20 feet (6.1 m)) and original embankments. The road is notable as part of the northern route of the Trail of Tears, when Native Americans living east of the Mississippi River were forcibly relocated to what is now Oklahoma, and for its use in military operations during the American Civil War. It is the longest known intact segment of the Trail of Tears in Arkansas.

The road segment was listed on the National Register of Historic Places in 2005.

== See also ==
- National Register of Historic Places listings in Benton County, Arkansas
- Springfield to Fayetteville Road-Elkhorn Tavern Segment
