= Pea Ridge Commercial Historic District =

Historic district in Arkansas, United States

- U.S. National Register of Historic Places
- U.S. Historic district
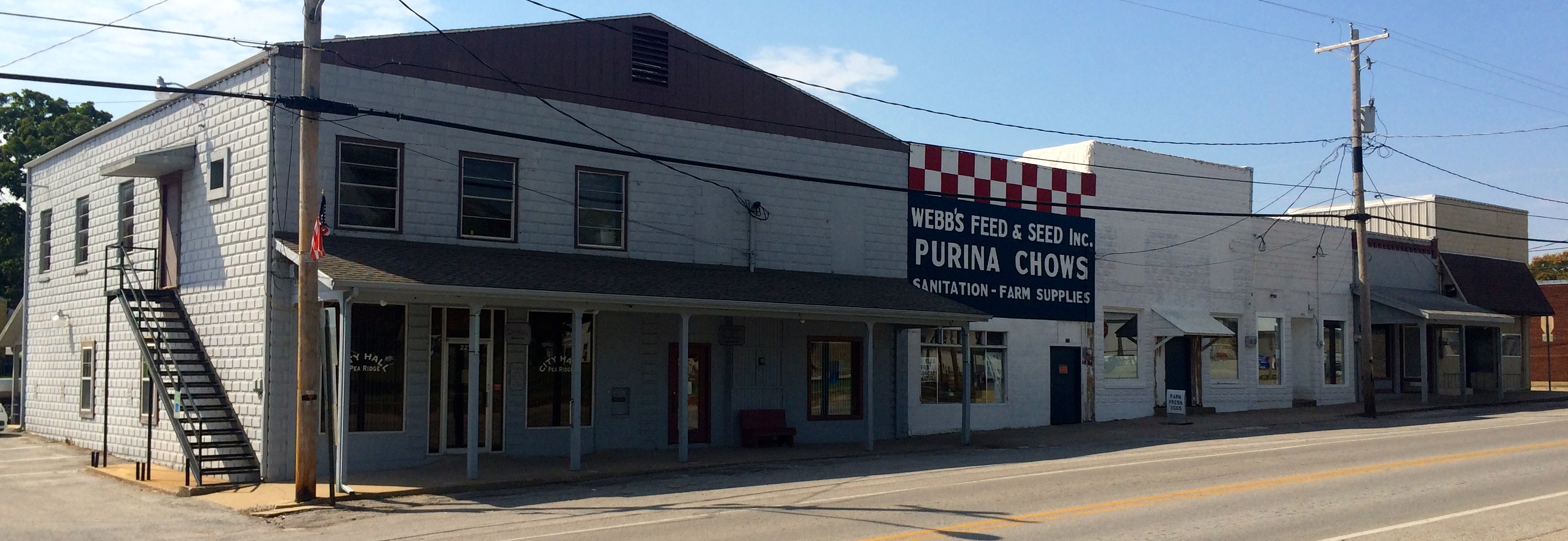

- Location within Arkansas Location within the United States
- Location: Pickens St. roughly be. Greene St. and Davis St. and Curtis Ave. roughly bet. Pike St. and Macintosh St., Pea Ridge, Arkansas
- Coordinates: 36°27′20″N 94°6′52″W
- Area: 6 acres (2.4 ha)
- Built: 1910
- Architectural style: Early Commercial, Plain-Traditional
- MPS: Benton County MRA
- NRHP reference No.: 07000445
- Added to NRHP: May 22, 2007

The Pea Ridge Commercial Historic District encompasses the historic commercial center of Pea Ridge, Arkansas. It includes twelve buildings on Pickens Street between Greene and Davis Streets, and another seven on Curtis Street between Pike and Macintosh Streets. Of these nineteen commercial and civic buildings, thirteen are historically significant. Most of these are typical commercial buildings built between 1910 and 1930, although several date to the 1950s. Some businesses, such as Webb's Feed Store, have been in business since the early period of development, in their original premises. The town grew as an agricultural center serving first local apple growers, and then tomato growers after blight destroyed many apple orchards.

The district was listed on the National Register of Historic Places in 2007.

== See also ==
- National Register of Historic Places listings in Benton County, Arkansas
