= Rogers Public Schools =

School district in Arkansas, United States

Address
- 500 West Walnut Street Rogers, Benton County, Arkansas, 72756-3774; United States
- Coordinates: 36°19′59″N 94°07′18″W

District information
- Motto: Where all belong, all learn, and all succeed
- Grades: PK–12
- Superintendent: Marlin Berry
- Asst. superintendent(s): Virginia Abernathy, Roger Hill, Charles Lee
- Governing agency: Arkansas Department of Education
- Schools: 23 (16 elementary, 4 middle schools, 3 high schools - plus, a pre-kindergarten center and an alternative school)
- NCES District ID: 0511970

Students and staff
- Students: 15,604
- Teachers: 1,028
- Staff: 769
- Student–teacher ratio: 15.18
- Athletic conference: 7A/6A West (2012–14)

Other information
- Website: www.rogersschools.net

Rogers Public Schools (formally Rogers Public School District #30) is a public school district based in Rogers, Arkansas, United States. As of the 2012–2013 school year, the district encompasses 232.52 square miles (602.2 km^{2}) of land and serves early childhood, elementary and secondary education to numerous Benton County communities.

== Service area ==
In addition to most of Rogers, the district includes Avoca, Lost Bridge Village, Lowell, Prairie Creek, most of Garfield and Little Flock, and portions of Bentonville, Cave Springs, Gateway, Pea Ridge, and Springdale (including portions of the former municipality of Bethel Heights).

== Schools ==
Rogers is ranked among the top 100 school districts in the state. In 2016, both Rogers and Heritage High Schools were recognized with Silver awards from U.S. News & World Report Top 1,000 High Schools in America with an Arkansas state ranking of No. 3 and No. 6 respectively. New Technology High School was nationally recognized with a Bronze award.

=== Secondary schools ===
- Rogers High School (Mountaineers), 9–12th grade high school established in 1922. Located in Rogers and serves around 2000 students.
- Rogers Heritage High School (War Eagles), 9–12th grade high school established in August 2008. Located in Rogers and serves around 2000 students.
- Rogers Academy of Leadership & Innovation (Vanguard), 9–12th grade charter high school established in August 2013. Located in Rogers and serves up to 600–900 high school students.

=== Middle schools ===
- Elmwood Middle School, located in Rogers and serves more than 800 students in grades 6 through 8.
- Birch Kirksey Middle School, located in Rogers and serves more than 900 students in grades 6 through 8.
- Greer Lingle Middle School, located in Rogers and serves more than 900 students in grades 6 through 8.
- Oakdale Middle School, located in Rogers and serves more than 750 students in grades 6 through 8.

=== Primary schools ===
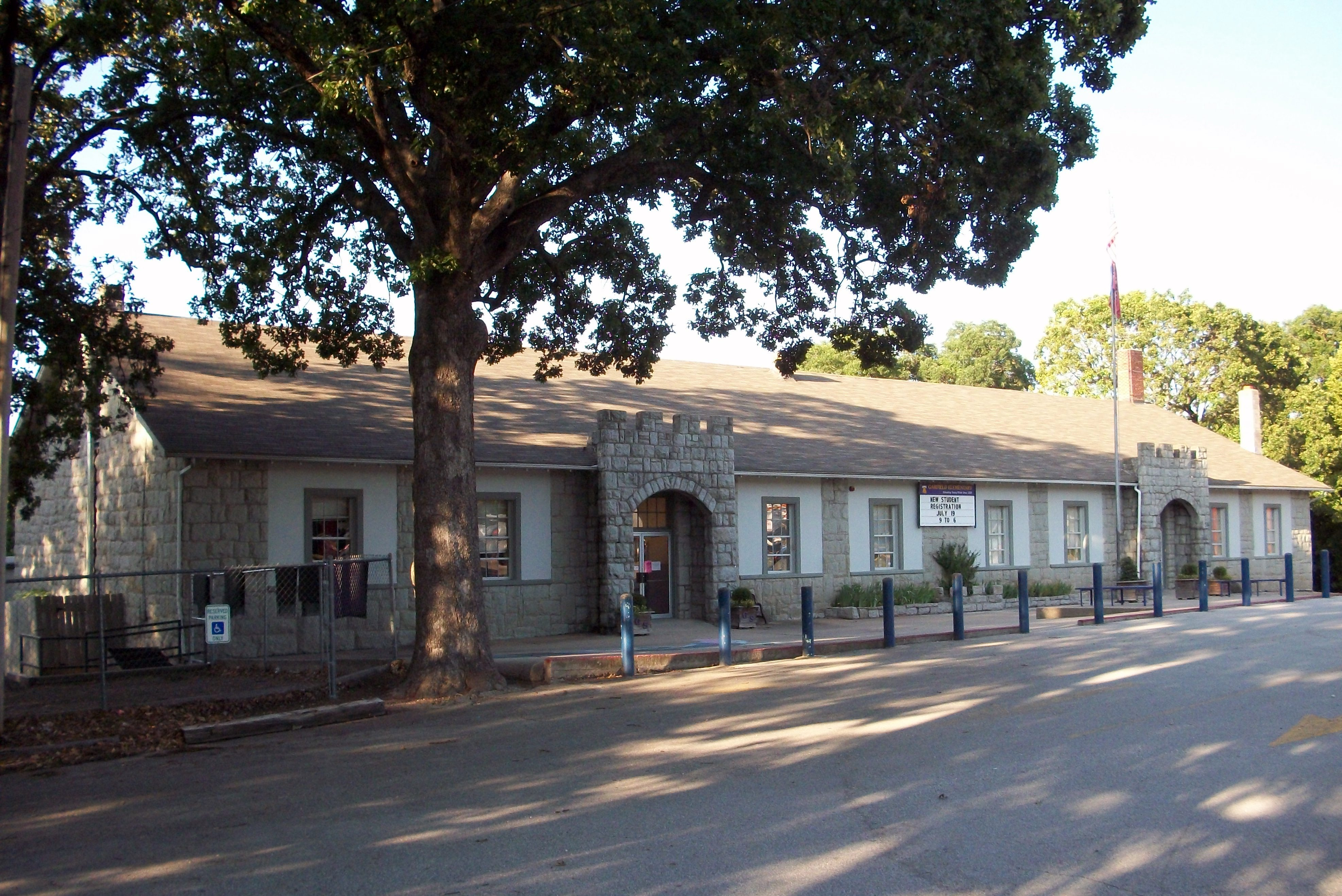
Garfield Elementary School in Garfield

In 2011, the U.S. Department of Education selected Bellview Elementary School for the top honor of being a National Blue Ribbon School. In 2012, Russell D. Jones Elementary School was selected for the same high honor.

- Bellview Elementary, located in Rogers and serving more than 500 students in pre-kindergarten through grade 5.
- Janie Darr Elementary, located in Rogers and serving up to 700 students in grades kindergarten through grade 5.
- Bonnie Grimes Elementary School, located in Rogers and serving more than 550 students in pre-kindergarten through grade 5.
- Eastside Elementary School, located in Rogers and serving more than 500 students in pre-kindergarten through grade 5.
- Elza R. Tucker Elementary School, located in Lowell and serving more than 600 students in pre-kindergarten through grade 5.
- Frank Tillery Elementary School, located in Rogers and serving more than 550 students in pre-kindergarten through grade 5.
- Garfield Elementary, located in Garfield and serving more than 125 students in pre-kindergarten through grade 5.
- Grace Hill Elementary School, located in Rogers and serving more than 500 students in pre-kindergarten through grade 5.
- Joe Mathias Elementary School, located in Rogers and serving more than 450 students in kindergarten through grade 5.
- Russell D. Jones Elementary School, located in Rogers and serving more than 425 students in pre-kindergarten through grade 5.
- Lowell Elementary School, located in Lowell and serving more than 500 students in pre-kindergarten through grade 5.
- Northside Elementary School, located in Rogers and serving more than 500 students in pre-kindergarten through grade 5.
- Old Wire Road Elementary School, located in Rogers and serving more than 500 students in pre-kindergarten through grade 5.
- Reagan Elementary School, located in Rogers and serving nearly 500 students in kindergarten through grade 5.
- Westside Elementary School, located in Rogers and serving nearly 500 students in kindergarten through grade 5.
