= Pea Ridge Day =

American baseball player (1899–1934)

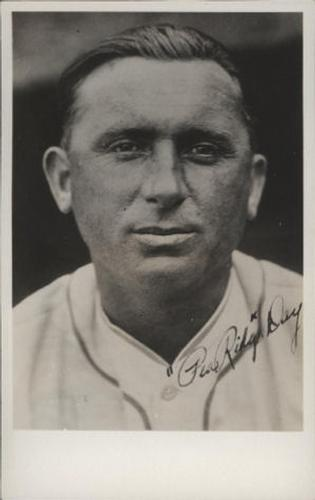
- Pitcher
- Born: August 15, 1899; Center, Missouri, U.S.
- Died: March 21, 1934 (aged 34); Kansas City, Missouri, U.S.
- Batted: Right Threw: Right

MLB debut
- September 19, 1924, for the St. Louis Cardinals

Last MLB appearance
- September 21, 1931, for the Brooklyn Robins

MLB statistics
- Win–loss record: 5–7
- Earned run average: 5.30
- Strikeouts: 48
- Stats at Baseball Reference

Teams
- St. Louis Cardinals (1924–1925); Cincinnati Reds (1926); Brooklyn Robins (1931)

Henry Clyde Day (August 26, 1899 – March 21, 1934) was a champion Arkansas hog-caller and right-handed pitcher in Major League Baseball who committed suicide after an unsuccessful operation to repair his throwing arm.

== The "Hog-Calling Pitcher" ==
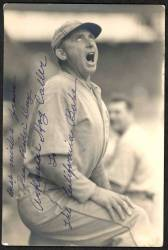
Hog-calling pitcher, Pea Ridge Day, circa 1921

Born in Center, Missouri, Day grew up in Pea Ridge, Arkansas, which gave him his nickname. He was a colorful player who was known as the "hog calling pitcher" for his habit of making Arkansas hog calls while on the pitcher's mound – sounds that one newspaper described as "piercing yells." Also known for his screwball pitch and his eccentric personality, Day was described in his obituary as "a care-free, fun-loving figure who gave the game one of its most widely known characters."

== Early career (1921–1930) ==
Day began his pitching career playing in the minor leagues for Joplin, Fort Smith, Little Rock, and Muskogee from 1921 to 1924. He made his major league debut in September 1924 with the St. Louis Cardinals, starting three games and going 1–1 in 17-2/3 innings with a 4.58 earned run average. In 1925, he played in 17 games for the Cardinals, four as a starter, with a record of 2–4 and a 6.30 ERA.

The Cardinals sent him to the minor leagues in Syracuse, and from there he signed for the 1926 season with the Cincinnati Reds, where he appeared in four games and 7-1/3 innings with a 7.36 earned run average. After being released by the Reds, Day spent the next five years in the minor leagues with the Syracuse Chiefs, Los Angeles Angels, Wichita Larks, Omaha Crickets, Kansas City Blues, and Minneapolis Millers.

In 1929, Day was the ace for the Blues (111–56), considered one of the best minor league baseball teams of all time. Day went 12–5 for the Blues, and his 2.98 ERA was second-lowest in the American Association. While playing for the Blues, Day was teammates with pitcher Max Thomas who went 18–11 that year and became friends with Day. Five years later, Day would visit Thomas in Kansas City, and Thomas would try unsuccessfully to save Pea Ridge's life.

== Facing Babe Ruth ==
In 1931, Day got a second shot at the big leagues, playing in 22 games with the Brooklyn Robins—now known as the Los Angeles Dodgers. He went 2–2 with a career-low 4.55 ERA for the Robins. He played in his final major league game in September 1931 and spent the 1932 and 1933 seasons with minor league stints in Minneapolis and Baltimore.

Hall-of-Fame catcher Al López caught for Day in 1931. In an Associated Press interview, Lopez recounted a story about a 1931 exhibition game against the New York Yankees. "The fans had been reading about him being a champion hog caller, so they all started calling 'Yip, yip yeeee!' He strikes out the first hitter, puts the ball and glove down and lets out this call. He strikes out the next batter and does it again. Babe Ruth was on deck, and he gets a big kick out of it. He's laughing at this guy. Then he has Ruth with two strikes. It gets real quiet. The fans are hoping he'll strike out Ruth so he can yell again. On the third pitch, Ruth hits one a mile over the fence. Henry Clyde Day never did his hog call again."

== Unsuccessful arm surgery ==
In 1932, Day pitched 145 innings for the Minneapolis Millers, going 9–8, but by 1933, Day's pitching arm was shot, and he was released by Baltimore in August 1933. Day reportedly "brooded almost continually" over the end of his pitching career. Desperate to revive his pitching career, Day went to the world-renowned Mayo Clinic in Rochester, Minnesota for a delicate and expensive operation to restore his arm. Day told his family that he had spent $10,000 on the arm (equivalent to $236,000 in 2025), and he was "crestfallen" when the surgery proved unsuccessful.

== Suicide ==
Aside from the deterioration of his arm, Day's life had been riddled with problems. His brother Lemmie was also a promising pitcher who had his leg amputated in 1922 and later died from "blood poisoning." In 1929, Day's mother committed suicide by drinking poison, and his father died of a heart attack in 1932.

In early 1934, Day's wife of eleven years gave birth to a baby boy, but Day was despondent at the loss of his pitching arm. Day reportedly turned to alcohol and in March 1934, traveled to Kansas City, "seeking treatment for lapses of memory." On March 21, while staying in the apartment of former teammate Max Thomas, Day slit his throat with a hunting knife. Thomas tried to stop Day but was pushed aside. His funeral in Pea Ridge was attended by more than 500 people.

Day was buried at the Pea Ridge Cemetery in Pea Ridge, Arkansas.
