= Bentonville School District =

School district in Arkansas, United States

Bentonville Schools
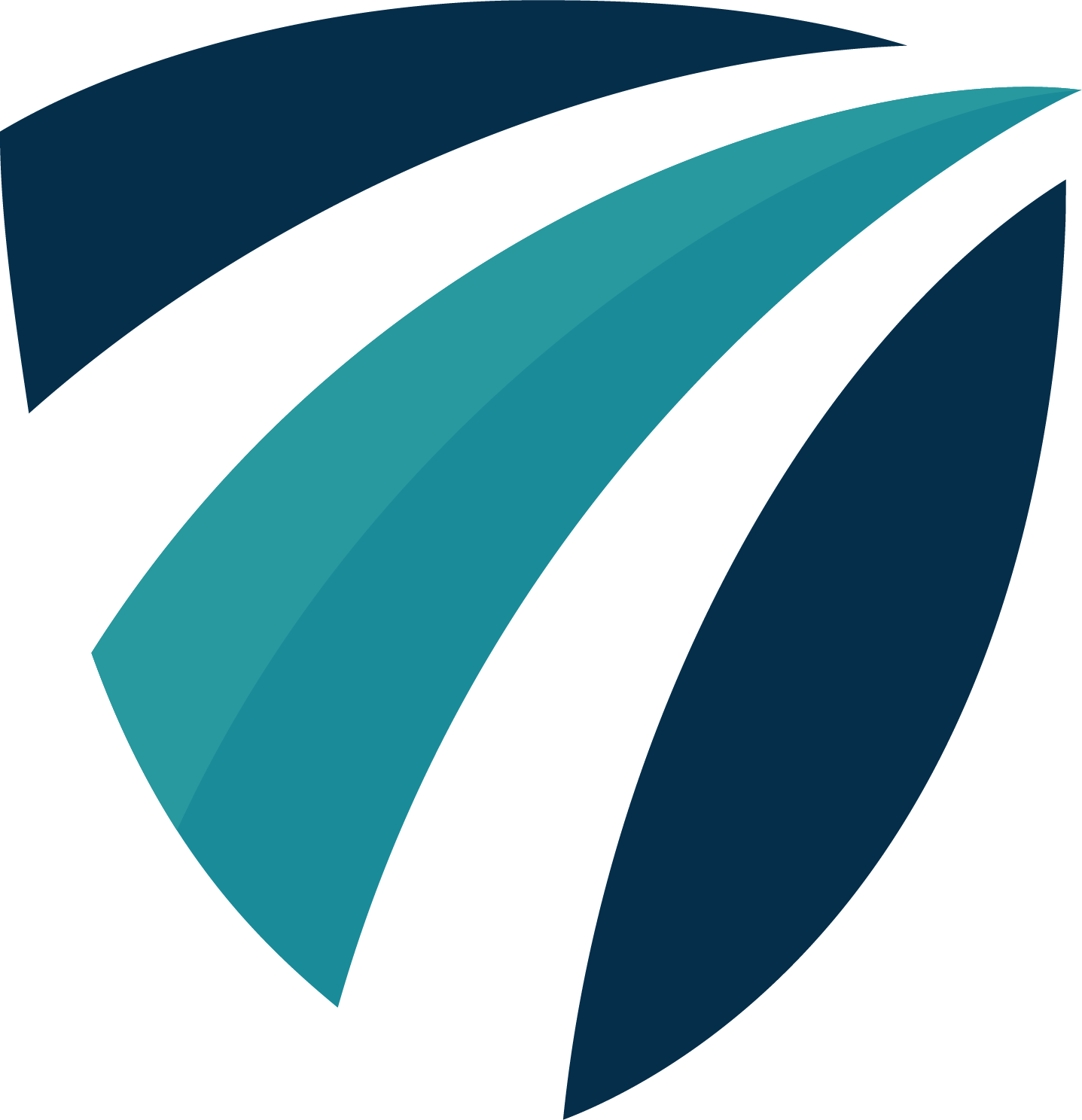

Location
- 500 Tiger Boulevard, Bentonville, Arkansas 72712 United States

District information
- Type: Public
- Grades: K - 12
- Superintendent: Debbie Jones
- NCES District ID: 0503060

Students and staff
- Students: 17,121
- Teachers: 846.85 (on FTE basis)
- Staff: 1,649.85 (on FTE basis)

Other information
- Website: bentonvillek12.org

Bentonville Schools is a comprehensive community school district serving students in kindergarten through 12th grade from Bentonville, Arkansas, in Benton County. Bentonville Schools encompasses 141.54 square miles (366.6 km^{2}) of land, including most of Bentonville, and portions of Bella Vista, Cave Springs, Centerton, Gravette, Highfill, Little Flock, Rogers, and Springdale. The district's significant geographic expansion and growing enrollment are characteristic of school systems in regions experiencing rapid economic and demographic growth, often driven by a major corporate presence.

As of the 2019-2020 school year, the district's 22 schools have a total enrollment of some 18,000 students and 1300 certified staff members. Bentonville Schools has grown dramatically in the last decade and is now one of the largest districts (by student population) in the state.

== History ==
In response to the Uvalde school shooting of 2022 there was more of a demand for armed guards. In 2022 the Bentonville School District administrators stated that they increased security but that it was not feasible to hire armed guards for all campuses due to difficulties in hiring and in loaning police officers from police departments.

== Schools ==
As of the 2019–2020 school year, Bentonville Schools operates 22 schools. An additional junior high school will open in fall of 2020.

=== Elementary Schools (Grade K–4) ===
The following information is based on 2019–2020 school year data available from the Bentonville School District website. All schools are located in Bentonville unless otherwise designated:

- Apple Glen
- Centerton Gamble; located in Centerton
- Central Park
- Cooper; located in Bella Vista
- Elm Tree
- Evening Star
- The International School at MMJ
- Osage Creek
- R. E. Baker
- Sugar Creek
- Thomas Jefferson
- Vaughn
- Willowbrook

=== Middle Schools (Grade 5–6) ===
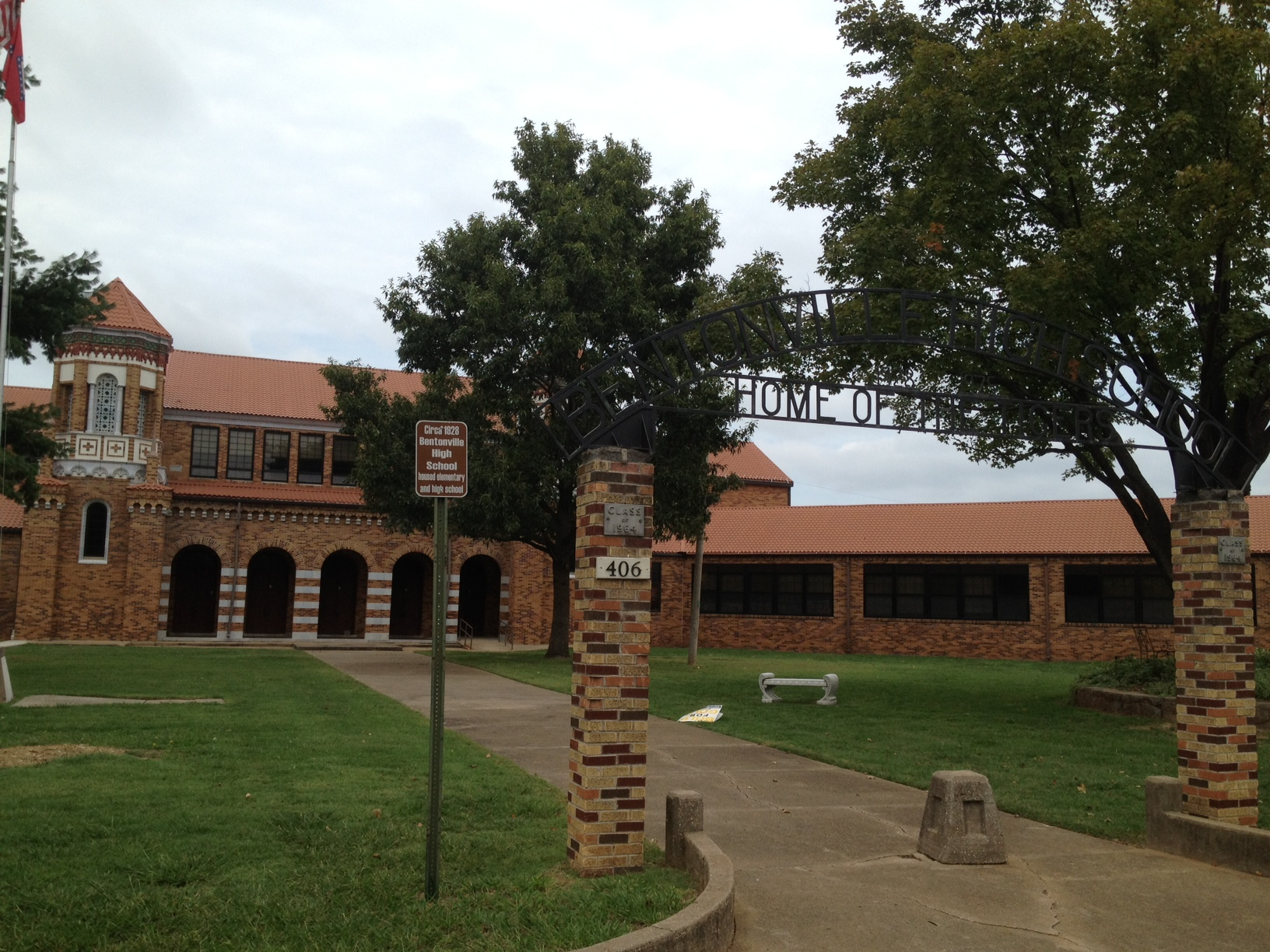
Old High Middle School

The following information is based on 2013–14 school year data available from the Bentonville School District website. All schools are located in Bentonville unless otherwise designated:

- Ardis Ann
- Bright Field
- Creekside
- Old High
- Ruth Barker

=== Junior High Schools (Grade 7–8) ===
The following information is based on 2019–20 school year data available from the Bentonville School District website. All schools are located in Bentonville unless otherwise designated:

- Fulbright
- Grimsley; located in Centerton.
- Lincoln
- Washington

=== High Schools (Grade 9–12) ===
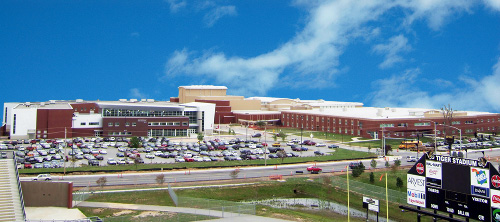
Bentonville High School

The following information is based on 2013–14 school year data available from the Bentonville School District website. All schools are located in Bentonville unless otherwise designated:

- Bentonville High School
- Bentonville West High School; located in Centerton.
