= Lee Ziemba =

American football player (born 1989)

No. 75
- Position: Offensive tackle

Personal information
- Born: March 29, 1989 (age 37); Albany, Georgia, U.S.
- Listed height: 6 ft 6 in (1.98 m)
- Listed weight: 317 lb (144 kg)

Career information
- High school: Rogers (Rogers, Arkansas)
- College: Auburn
- NFL draft: 2011: 7th round, 244th overall pick

Career history
- Carolina Panthers (2011−2012); Indianapolis Colts (2012–2013)*
- * Offseason or practice squad member only

Awards and highlights
- BCS national champion (2011); Consensus All-American (2010); First-team All-SEC (2010); Second-team All-SEC (2009); Jacobs Blocking Trophy (2010)

Career NFL statistics
- Games played: 6
- Stats at Pro Football Reference

Lee Ziemba (born March 29, 1989) is an American former professional football player who was an offensive tackle in the National Football League (NFL). He played college football for the Auburn Tigers, earning consensus All-American honors and winning the 2011 BCS National Championship. The Carolina Panthers selected Ziemba in the seventh round of the 2011 NFL draft.

== Early life ==
Ziemba was born in Albany, Georgia. He attended Rogers High School in Rogers, Arkansas, where he played for the Rogers Mounties high school football team. He registered 31 pancake blocks, 43 knockdown blocks and was in on 11 tackles and 1.5 sacks playing defense in goal line situations as a senior. He received high school All-American honors from Parade magazine and USA Today.

Considered a four-star recruit by Rivals.com, Ziemba was listed as the No. 4 offensive tackle prospect in the nation.

== College career ==
Ziemba attended Auburn University, and played for the Auburn Tigers football team from 2007 to 2010. He started every game during his four years at Auburn. As a true freshman in 2007, Ziemba received Freshman All-American honors by College Football News, The Sporting News, and Rivals.com.

The 2010 Iron Bowl against Alabama marked Ziemba's 50th start, breaking the previous school record for most starts. By starting in the BCS National Championship, Ziemba extended his record to 52 starts.

As a senior, Ziemba was named to the 2010 AFCA Coaches’ All-America team. He also won the Jacobs Blocking Trophy, an award given to the SEC's best blocker.

== Professional career ==
Pre-draft measurables
Height	Weight	Arm length	Hand span	Wingspan	40-yard dash	10-yard split	20-yard split	20-yard shuttle	Three-cone drill	Vertical jump	Broad jump	Bench press
6 ft 5 5/8 in (1.97 m)	317 lb (144 kg)	34 in (0.86 m)	9 5/8 in (0.24 m)	6 ft 8 3/8 in (2.04 m)	5.46 s	1.87 s	3.06 s	4.65 s	7.74 s	29.0 in (0.74 m)	8 ft 4 in (2.54 m)	20 reps
All values from NFL Combine/Pro Day

=== Carolina Panthers ===
Ziemba was selected by the Carolina Panthers in the seventh round with the 244th overall pick in the 2011 NFL draft. He was waived/injured on August 10, 2012, and subsequently reverted to injured reserve on August 12.

=== Indianapolis Colts ===
Ziemba was signed to the practice squad of the Indianapolis Colts on December 18, 2012. He signed a reserve/future contract with the Colts on January 8, 2013. He was waived on August 31, 2013.
