= Pea Ridge School District =

School district in Arkansas, United States

Address
- 979 Weston Street Pea Ridge, Arkansas, 72751; United States

District information
- Type: Public
- Grades: PreK–12
- NCES District ID: 0503030

Students and staff
- Students: 2,252
- Teachers: 143.27
- Staff: 169.0
- Student–teacher ratio: 15.72

Other information
- Website: www.pearidgek12.com

Pea Ridge School District 109 is a school district based in Pea Ridge, Benton County, Arkansas. The district is accredited by the Arkansas Department of Education (ADE) and AdvancED.

The district includes the majority of Pea Ridge, half of Gateway, sections of Garfield, and very small portions of Bella Vista and Little Flock.

== Schools ==
- Pea Ridge High School (10–12)
- Pea Ridge Junior High School (7-9)
- Pea Ridge Middle School (5–6)
- Pea Ridge Intermediate School (3–4)
- Pea Ridge Primary School (KG–2)
- Pea Ridge Academy (alternative learning environment)
