= North Pulaski High School =

Location
- Jacksonville, Arkansas; United States; 34°53′0.6″N 92°9′34.2″W

Information
- Type: Public secondary
- Established: 1977 (49 years ago)
- School district: Pulaski County Special School District
- NCES District ID: 0511850
- CEEB code: 041227
- NCES School ID: 051185000932
- Principal: Jeff Senn
- Faculty: 61.04 (on FTE basis)
- Grades: 9-12
- Enrollment: 820 (2010-11)
- Student to teacher ratio: 13.43
- Colors: Maroon and gold
- Athletics conference: 5A Central (2012-2014); 5A Southeast (2008-2012)
- Mascot: Falcon
- Team name: North Pulaski Falcons
- Rivals: Jacksonville High (Red Devils); Sylvan Hills (Bears)
- Yearbook: The Falcon

North Pulaski High School was a public secondary school located in Jacksonville, Arkansas and served students in grades 9 through 12. North Pulaski was administered by the Pulaski County Special School District. Since 1979, North Pulaski has been accredited by the AdvancED. North Pulaski was merged with Jacksonville High School in 2016 as a part of the Jacksonville North Pulaski School District.

== Academics ==
The assumed course of study for students follows the Smart Core curriculum developed by the Arkansas Department of Education (ADE), which requires students complete 22 units with 16 core and 6 career focus and elective units. Students complete regular (core and career focus) courses and exams and may select Advanced Placement (AP) coursework and exams that provide an opportunity for college credit.

=== Awards and recognition ===
North Pulaski maintains a student-run Simply Delicious restaurant as part of the school's culinary arts program. NPHS is a member of the National Restaurant Association Educational Foundation (NRAEF) that sponsors ProStart®, which is a nationwide, two-year high school program that unites the classroom and industry to develop students into restaurant and foodservice leaders. Students may qualify for the ProStart National Certificate of Achievement (COA) and compete in the state's ProStart competitions in two categories: restaurant management and culinary arts. In 2013, North Pulaski won both and represented Arkansas at the National ProStart Invitational competition.

== Creative and performing arts ==
The school band programs performed at various competitions including invitationals and regional assessments administered by the Arkansas School Band and Orchestra Association (ASBOA). The North Pulaski High School Band was a 23-time consecutive winner of the ASBOA Sweepstakes Award, which denotes 1st Division ratings in sight-reading, concert band composite and marching band composite scoring. In addition, the marching band was awarded the 1991 Sweepstakes Winner at Worlds of Fun Music Festival in Kansas City, Missouri; the 1994 Best in Class at North American Music Festival in Atlanta, Georgia and the Arkansas representative in the 1997, 2000, and 2003 National Independence Day Parade in Washington, DC. The choral program at North Pulaski continuously scored First Division ratings at evaluative festivals, and placed large numbers of students in the Region and State choirs.

In 2012, Karen Dismuke received the Arkansas Bandmaster of the Year award.

The Drama and Competitive Speech program at North Pulaski was competitive and became one of the charter chapters of the Arkansas District of the National Forensic League (speech and debate honor society). North Pulaski won Sweepstake awards at statewide tournaments and produced two mainstage productions a year. North Pulaski was known for its Performing Arts Department offering classes in Drama, Stagecraft, and Competitive Speaking.

== Athletics ==
The North Pulaski High School mascot is the falcon and maroon and gold are the school colors. For 2012-14, the North Pulaski Falcons compete in the 7A Central Conference administered by the Arkansas Activities Association (AAA) in several interscholastic athletic activities including: football, cross country (boys and girls), baseball, basketball (boys and girls), track & field (boys and girls), wrestling, volleyball (girls), and soccer.

The 5A-Central Conference members (2012–14) include:

- Helena-West Helena Central Mighty Cougars
- Little Rock Christian Academy Warriors
- Jacksonville Red Devils
- McClellan Crimson Lions
- Mills University Studies Comets
- North Pulaski Falcons
- Pulaski Academy Bruins
- Sylvan Hills Bears

At the 2007 homecoming game against the Greene County Tech Eagles, the Falcon football team snapped its 32-game losing streak it had since September 2004 scoring 56-6.

The North Pulaski wrestling team under the direction of Coach Mongno and basketball teams under the guidance of Raymond Cooper were state runners up in the 2008-2009 school year.
