= Old High Middle School (Bentonville, Arkansas) =

- Bentonville High School
- U.S. National Register of Historic Places
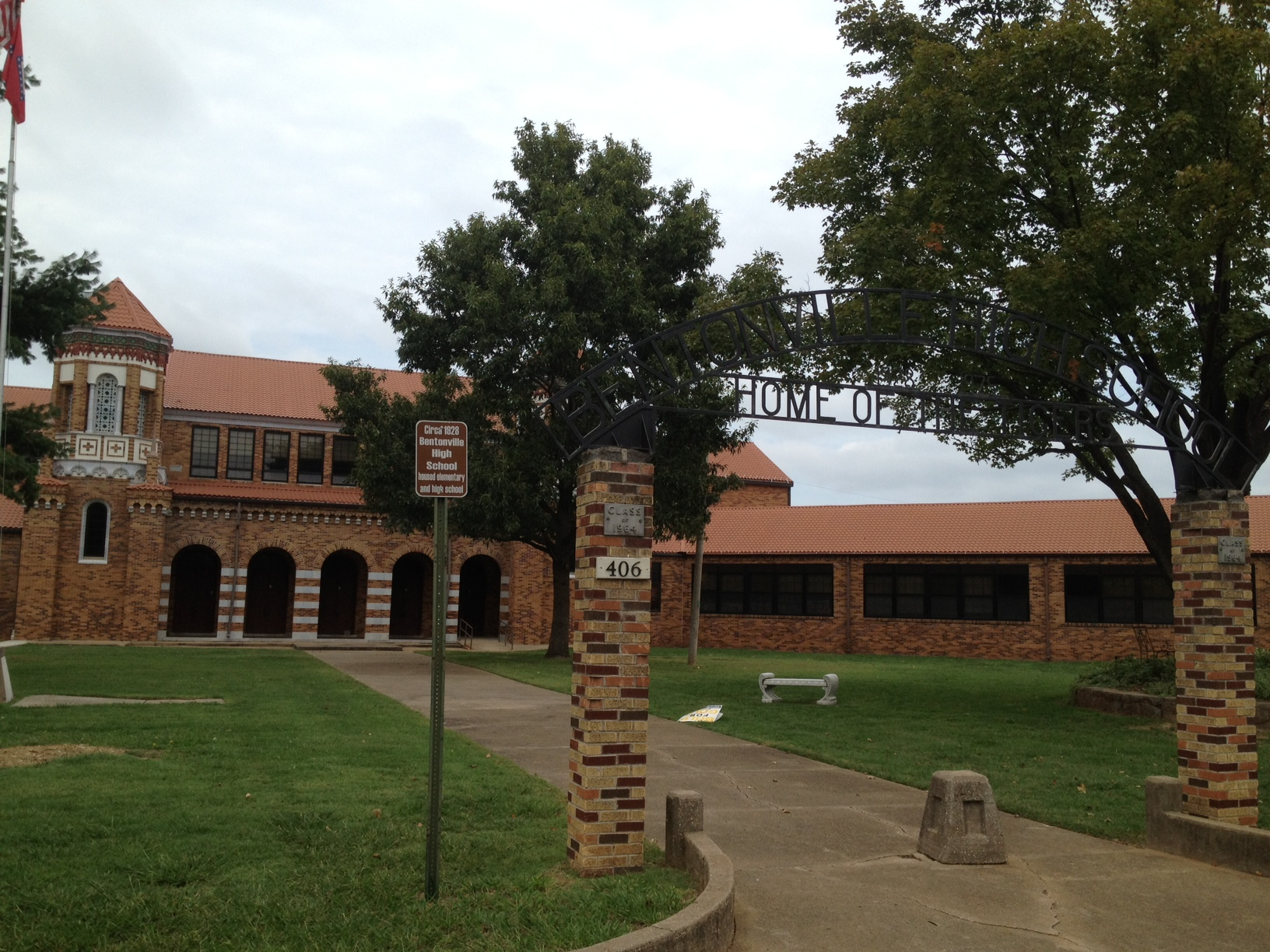

- Location within Arkansas Location within the United States
- Location: 406 N.W. Second St., Bentonville, Arkansas
- Coordinates: 36°22′25″N 94°12′49″W
- Built: 1928
- Architect: John Parks Almand
- Architectural style: Spanish Colonial
- Website: http://oldhigh.bentonvillek12.org/pages/Old_High_Middle_School
- MPS: Benton County MRA
- NRHP reference No.: 87002339
- Added to NRHP: January 28, 1988

Old High Middle School is a public middle school in Bentonville, Arkansas, part of the Bentonville Public Schools. Its building was once home to Bentonville High School. It was designed by John Parks Almand. It combines Spanish Colonial, Mission, and Mediterranean styles. Construction costs during building in 1928 were $25,000.

It was listed on the National Register of Historic Places in 1989 as Bentonville High School. Its current principal is Leslie Lyons. It is located in the range of Bentonville Public Schools and in 2022–2023 school year principal Leslie Lyons won the AAMS award for Arkansas middle-level school principal of the year. Also in that year Ms. Julie Turners Class raised 3,000 U.S Dollars to a fund titled "Knights 4 K9s" and were recognized on KNWA'S Doing Good Segment in May 2023.

== History ==
The main structure was built in 1928. After years of serving as an elementary and high school campus, Old High Middle School was established in 1990. 1990-1991 also brought about renovations to the auditorium as well. The Bentonville/Bella Vista Rotary Club worked with the community to renovate the original structure with one-third of the money raised sourced from a concert by New Kids on the Block. In May 2015, Old High Middle School's auditorium was chosen as one of the venues for the Bentonville Film Festival. It was later concluded that the popularity of the film festival demanded a larger venue, and in May 2016, Old High hosted the successful Bentonville Film Festival, which included actress Geena Davis.

== Academics ==
More than 600 students in classes five and six are enrolled at Old High Middle School. The school's stated vision is "A community that fosters and develops healthy life long learners, innovators, and problem solvers that contribute to their community". Old High is organized by Teams into which students are placed. Leslie Lyons is currently the school's Principal.

Communities zoned to Old High Middle include: sections of northwest Bentonville, much of Bella Vista, and a small section of Gravette.

== See also ==
- Bentonville High School, the current high school.
- National Register of Historic Places listings in Benton County, Arkansas
