= Rogers Heritage High School =

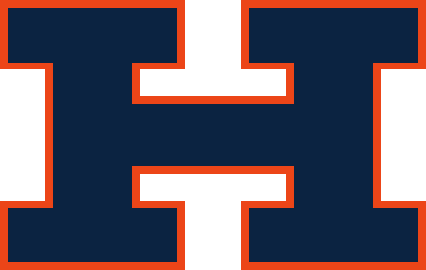

Location
- 1114 South 5th Street; Rogers, Arkansas; United States; 36°19′25″N 94°7′24″W

Information
- Type: Public
- Established: 2008 (18 years ago)
- School district: Rogers School District
- NCES District ID: 0511970
- CEEB code: 042168
- NCES School ID: 051197001483
- Principal: Chip Greenwell
- Staff: 184.98 (FTE)
- Grades: 9-12
- Student to teacher ratio: 11.49
- Colors: Navy blue and orange
- Athletics: Football, soccer, wrestling
- Athletics conference: 7A West
- Mascot: War Eagle
- Rivals: Rogers High School
- USNWR ranking: 5613 (National); 91 (State)
- Website: heritage.rogersschools.net

Rogers Heritage High School is a comprehensive public high school in Rogers, Arkansas for students in grades nine through twelve. Rogers Public Schools established the school in 2008. The first graduating class was in 2010.

== Curriculum ==
The assumed course of study at Rogers Heritage High School follows the Smart Core curriculum approved by the Arkansas Department of Education (ADE). Students complete regular courses and exams and may select to take Advanced Placement (AP) coursework and exams, which may lead to college credit. The school is accredited by AdvancED. In 2012, Rogers Heritage was nationally recognized with the silver medalist award from U.S. News & World Report Best High Schools Report with a No. 5 ranking in Arkansas and No. 980 nationally.

== Extracurricular activities ==
Rogers Heritage War Eagles compete in interscholastic competition at the state's largest classification level (7A) in the 7A West Conference administered by the Arkansas Activities Association (AAA). Activities include baseball, basketball (boys/girls), bowling (boys/girls), competitive cheer, cheer, cross country (boys/girls), competitive dance, dance, debate, football, golf, (boys/girls), quiz bowl, soccer (boys/girls), softball, speech, swimming (boys/girls), tennis (boys/girls), track (boys/girls), volleyball and wrestling.

In 2010, the wrestling team won the 7A State State Wrestling Championships. Students in debate compete at events sponsored by the International Public Debate Association.

== Feeder patterns ==
The following elementary schools feed into Rogers Heritage: Eastside, Garfield, Grace Hill, Mathias, Northside, Reagan, Tillery, and Westside. Two middle schools, Lingle and Oakdale, feed into Rogers Heritage.
