= Garfield Elementary School (Garfield, Arkansas) =

- Garfield Scholars’ Academy
- U.S. National Register of Historic Places
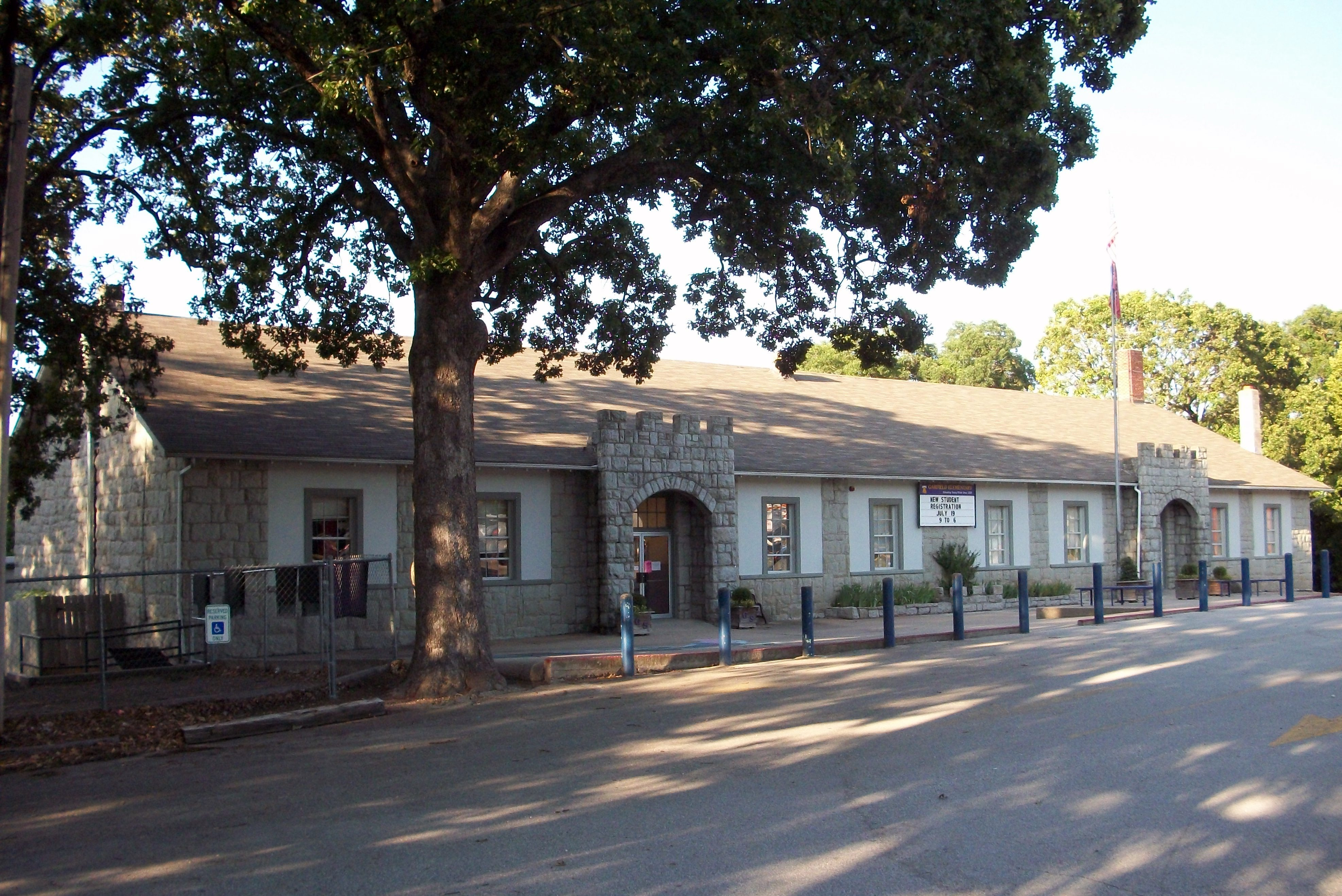

- Location within Arkansas Location within the United States
- Location: 18432 Marshall St., Garfield, Arkansas
- Coordinates: 36°26′55″N 93°58′17″W
- Area: 3.3 acres (1.3 ha)
- Built: 1941
- Architect: Garis Noderly, Junior Ross
- Architectural style: Rustic Revival
- MPS: Public Schools in the Ozarks MPS
- NRHP reference No.: 96000693
- Added to NRHP: June 28, 1996

The Garfield School Building is a historic school building on United States Route 62 in Garfield, Arkansas, near its junction with Arkansas Highway 127. It is a public charter elementary school of Garfield Scholars’ Academy

It is a single-story rusticated stone building, built in 1941 to replace a nearby building which had fallen into disrepair. It is a T-shaped structure, with a long east–west section housing offices and classrooms, and a projecting auditorium to the rear. The prominent features of the main façade are two projecting castellated entrance porticos, which have raised parapets, and segmented-arch openings.

== History ==
Garfield Elementary School (the institution, not the building) was established in 1885.

The building was listed on the National Register of Historic Places in 1996.

The district researched the possibility of making the school compliant with the Americans With Disabilities Act. The district staff wrote in a report in 2019 that doing so for Garfield Elementary would be "beyond expensive".

A person who owned property in Garfield agreed to donate 20 acres (8.1 ha) to the Rogers School District so it could build a new facility, though the district has not yet determined if it wants to build a replacement facility on that site. The school district plans to close the existing Garfield school building and move students to another building that is scheduled to begin operations in 2024.

== See also ==
- National Register of Historic Places listings in Benton County, Arkansas
