= Gateway, Arkansas =

- Town
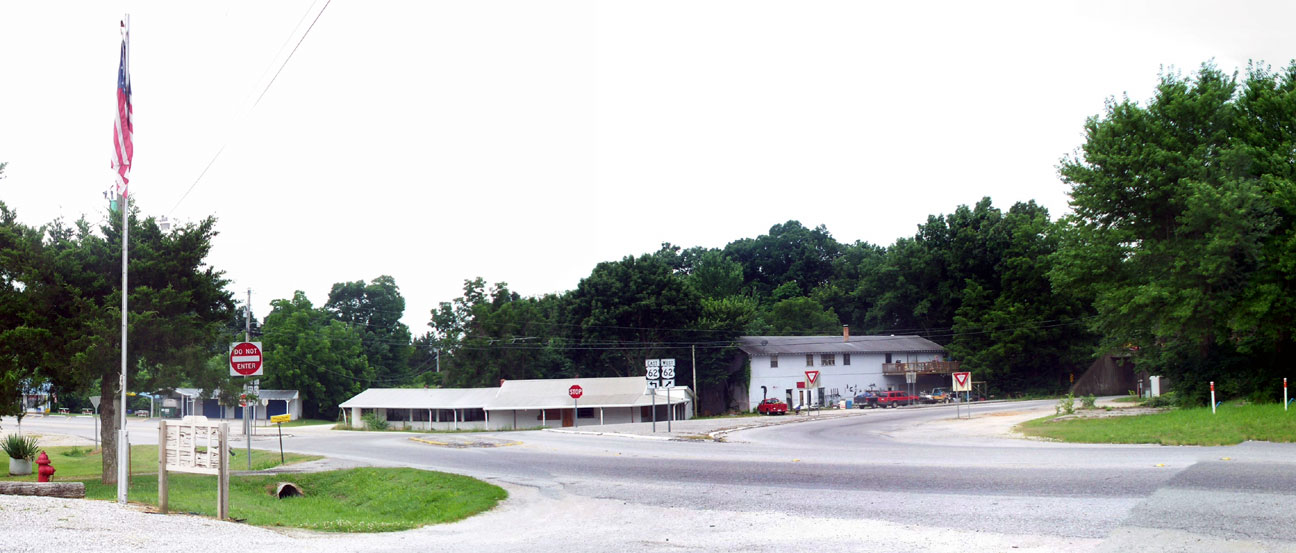
- Principal intersection in Gateway, Arkansas

- Location of Gateway in Benton County, Arkansas.
- Coordinates: 36°29′10″N 93°56′18″W
- Country: United States
- State: Arkansas
- County: Benton

Area
  - Total: 6.56 sq mi (17.00 km^{2})
  - Land: 6.56 sq mi (16.99 km^{2})
  - Water: 0.0039 sq mi (0.01 km^{2})
- Elevation: 1,558 ft (475 m)

Population (2020)
  - Total: 436
  - Estimate (2025): 457 ▲
  - Density: 66.5/sq mi (25.66/km^{2})
- Time zone: UTC-6 (Central (CST))
  - Summer (DST): UTC-5 (CDT)
- ZIP code: 72733
- Area code: 479
- FIPS code: 05-26110
- GNIS feature ID: 2406553
- Website: townofgatewayar.com

Gateway is a town in Benton County, Arkansas, United States. The population was 436 at the 2020 census, up from 405 in 2010. It is part of the Northwest Arkansas region. The town's name reflects its situation as the "gateway" to and from Arkansas.

== Geography ==
Gateway is located in northeastern Benton County at 36°29′10″N 93°56′18″W (36.486000, -93.938253), along the Missouri border. U.S. Route 62 passes through the town, leading east to Eureka Springs and Berryville and southwest to Rogers. Arkansas Highway 37 leads north to the Missouri line, where Missouri Route 37 continues north to Seligman and Cassville, Missouri. Gateway is on a plateau in the Ozarks at 1,600 feet (490 m) above sea level, overlooking the valley of the White River and Beaver Lake to the south.

According to the United States Census Bureau, the town has a total area of 6.1 square miles (15.9 km^{2}), all land.

== Demographics ==
Historical population
Census	Pop.	Note	%±
1940	57		—
1950	97		70.2%
1960	63		−35.1%
1970	83		31.7%
1980	75		−9.6%
1990	65		−13.3%
2000	116		78.5%
2010	405		249.1%
2020	436		7.7%
2025 (est.)	457	▲	4.8%
U.S. Decennial Census

As of the census of 2000, there were 116 people, 43 households, and 30 families residing in the town. The population density was 203.9 inhabitants per square mile (78.7/km^{2}). There were 48 housing units at an average density of 84.4 per square mile (32.6/km^{2}). The racial makeup of the town was 96.55% White and 3.45% Native American.

There were 43 households, out of which 39.5% had children under the age of 18 living with them, 62.8% were married couples living together, 2.3% had a female householder with no husband present, and 30.2% were non-families. 20.9% of all households were made up of individuals, and 7.0% had someone living alone who was 65 years of age or older. The average household size was 2.70 and the average family size was 3.27.

In the town, the population was spread out, with 26.7% under the age of 18, 12.1% from 18 to 24, 25.9% from 25 to 44, 28.4% from 45 to 64, and 6.9% who were 65 years of age or older. The median age was 38 years. For every 100 females, there were 107.1 males. For every 100 females age 18 and over, there were 117.9 males.

The median income for a household in the town was $32,679, and the median income for a family was $45,625. Males had a median income of $41,875 versus $33,958 for females. The per capita income for the town was $16,557. There were 9.1% of families and 10.1% of the population living below the poverty line, including none under 18 and 50.0% of those over 65.

== Education ==
Public education for early childhood, elementary, and secondary school students is provided by two different school districts, depending on the area: Rogers Public Schools and Pea Ridge School District. The latter operates Pea Ridge High School.

== "Devil in the Ozarks" incidents ==
In 2017, 56-year old Grant Hardin, a correctional officer at the Northwest Arkansas Community Correction Center in Fayetteville, Arkansas, pleaded guilty to first-degree murder and received a 30-year sentence. Hardin shot James Appleton, who worked for the water department of Gateway, in the head. Hardin had been the police chief of Gateway in 2016 for four months in 2016 before being relieved of duty. He had also held other law enforcement positions from which he was fired or forced to resign.

Two years later, Hardin's DNA was connected to two 1997 rapes of a schoolteacher in Rogers, Arkansas, and he pleaded guilty to those charges, receiving two 25-year sentences.

Hardin's crimes were the basis for the 2023 HBO Max documentary Devil in the Ozarks.

On May 25, 2025, while serving his sentences in the North Central Unit prison in Calico Rock, Arkansas, Hardin used a fake uniform and passed as a correctional officer, escaping the prison and raising concern among people in Gateway that he might return for retribution. Hardin was recaptured on June 6.
