= Rogers High School (Arkansas) =

Location
- 2300 South Dixieland Road; Rogers, Arkansas 72758; United States; 36°18′0″N 94°8′49″W

Information
- Type: Public High School
- Motto: "It's a GREAT day to be a Mountie!"
- Established: 1922 (104 years ago)
- School district: Rogers Public Schools
- NCES District ID: 0511970
- CEEB code: 042165
- NCES School ID: 051197000958
- Principal: Lisa Williams
- Teaching staff: 172.82 (FTE)
- Grades: 9-12
- Enrollment: 2,379 (2023-2024)
- Student to teacher ratio: 13.77
- Colors: Royal blue and white
- Athletics conference: 7A West
- Mascot: Mountaineer
- Nickname: Mountie
- Rival: Rogers Heritage High School
- Accreditation: AdvancED
- USNWR ranking: 2883 (National); 35 (State)
- Newspaper: Mountie Spectrum
- Yearbook: The Mountaineer
- Affiliations: Arkansas Activities Association (AAA)
- Website: rhs.rogersschools.net

Rogers High School is a public high school for students in grades nine through twelve located in Rogers, Arkansas. Rogers High School is managed by the Rogers Public Schools and served by the main feeder schools of Elmwood Middle School and Kirksey Middle School.

== History ==
Established in 1922 to support the education of in Rogers and nearby communities. As of the 2008–09 school year, with the opening of Heritage High School on the site of the Old high school, Rogers High School houses 2,144 students in one building. With the recent increase in students, the Rogers Academy of Leadership and Innovation, or RALI for short, has been opened as one of the high schools now in the Rogers School District. Rogers New Tech changed names to RALI before the 2026-2027 school year.

== Curriculum ==
The comprehensive curriculum at Rogers High School is accredited by AdvancED and the Arkansas Department of Education (ADE). Students may participate in regular and Advanced Placement (AP) coursework and exams prior to graduation. As of 2026, the Rogers High School curriculum contains the Cambridge International School Pathway endorsed by the historic English college. The Rogers Heritage High School provides approved curriculum approved by the Arkansas Department of Education. In 2012, Rogers High School was awarded the Silver Award from U.S. News & World Report Top 1,000 High Schools in America with a No. 4 ranking in Arkansas and No. 881 nationally. For 2010, Rogers was ranked No. 1148 in the Newsweek ranking of the top six percent of public high schools.

== Extracurricular activities ==
The Rogers High mascot is the "Mountaineer"; frequently shortened to "Mountie". The school colors are royal blue and white. Rogers Mounties compete in interscholastic competition at the state's largest classification level (7A) in the 7A West Conference administered by the Arkansas Activities Association (AAA). Activities include baseball, basketball (boys/girls), bowling (boys/girls), competitive cheer, cheer, cross country (boys/girls), competitive dance, dance, debate, football, golf (boys/girls), soccer (boys/girls), softball, speech, swimming (boys/girls), tennis (boys/girls), track (boys/girls), volleyball and wrestling. They also compete in quiz bowl under the Arkansas Governor's Quizbowl Association.

Rogers boasts the state's most successful girls cross country program with a state-record 18 state championships between 1980 and 2023, including six (1980-1985) and five (1989-1993) consecutive titles, respectively. The boy's squad has raced its way to 19 cross country state championships between 1988 and 2016 with seven consecutive banners raised from 2002 to 2008. The girls soccer team has won 4 state titles (2004, 2005, 2006, 2018). The boys' soccer team won the 2017 state title. The girls tennis team won its first state tennis championship in 2012. The girls bowling team won their first state bowling championship in 2012. In baseball, Rogers won their first state title in 2021. They also knocked in a state record 11 home runs, including 6 in a single game in the 1999 state tournament. They have recently become much more successful in quiz bowl, making it to the state finals in 2022 in which they placed 2nd in the televised game against Southside High School.

In 2012, sprinter and former Arkansas Track and Field Walk-On Chase Lamers was awarded the Gatorade State Boys Track & Field Athlete of the Year award.

== Notable alumni ==
- Ryan Hale American football player, New York Giants
- Lee Ziemba American football player, Carolina Panthers
- Jonathan Brewer American football coach (offensive coordinator and quarterback coach), Duke Blue Devils football
- Braxton Lindsey American football player, BYU Cougars
