= Turkey pea =

Turkey pea is a common name for several plants and may refer to:

- Dicentra canadensis, native to eastern North America
- Erigenia bulbosa, native to eastern North America
- Sanicula tuberosa, native to western North America
- Tephrosia virginiana, native to eastern North America
