= Little Flock, Arkansas =

- City
- Location of Little Flock in Benton County, Arkansas.
- Coordinates: 36°23′06″N 94°07′21″W
- Country: United States
- State: Arkansas
- County: Benton

Area
  - Total: 7.51 sq mi (19.46 km^{2})
  - Land: 7.51 sq mi (19.45 km^{2})
  - Water: 0 sq mi (0.00 km^{2})
- Elevation: 1,253 ft (382 m)

Population (2020)
  - Total: 3,055
  - Estimate (2025): 3,039 ▼
  - Density: 406.8/sq mi (157.05/km^{2})
- Time zone: UTC-6 (Central (CST))
  - Summer (DST): UTC-5 (CDT)
- ZIP codes: 72712 (Bentonville); 72756 (Rogers)
- Area code: 479
- FIPS code: 05-40120
- GNIS feature ID: 2404938
- Website: cityoflittleflock.com

Little Flock is a city in Benton County, Arkansas, United States. The population was 3,055 at the 2020 census. It is part of the Northwest Arkansas region.

== Geography ==
Little Flock is located on a tributary of Little Sugar Creek approximately two miles north of Rogers.

According to the United States Census Bureau, the city has a total area of 7.6 square miles (20 km^{2}), all land.

== Demographics ==
Historical population
Census	Pop.	Note	%±
1980	663		—
1990	944		42.4%
2000	2,585		173.8%
2010	2,585		0.0%
2020	3,055		18.2%
2025 (est.)	3,039	▼	−0.5%
U.S. Decennial Census

=== 2020 census ===
Little Flock racial composition
Race	Number	Percentage
White (non-Hispanic)	2,212	72.41%
Black or African American (non-Hispanic)	61	2.0%
Native American	26	0.85%
Asian	91	2.98%
Pacific Islander	16	0.52%
Other/Mixed	221	7.23%
Hispanic or Latino	428	14.01%

As of the 2020 census, there were 3,055 people and 1,338 households in the city. As reported in 2020 census tabulations, there were 686 families residing in the city.

The median age was 34.1 years. 22.1% of residents were under the age of 18 and 12.8% of residents were 65 years of age or older. For every 100 females there were 97.2 males, and for every 100 females age 18 and over there were 97.6 males age 18 and over.

60.3% of residents lived in urban areas, while 39.7% lived in rural areas.

Of the city's households, 29.4% had children under the age of 18 living in them. Of all households, 42.3% were married-couple households, 24.1% were households with a male householder and no spouse or partner present, and 26.0% were households with a female householder and no spouse or partner present. About 33.3% of all households were made up of individuals and 7.0% had someone living alone who was 65 years of age or older.

There were 1,391 housing units, of which 3.8% were vacant. The homeowner vacancy rate was 1.4% and the rental vacancy rate was 3.8%.

=== 2010 census ===
As of the census of 2010, there were 2,585 people, in 1,126 households with 99.0% of the population in households. The racial makeup of the population was 76.1% non-Hispanic white, 2.5% black or African American, 1.9% Native American, 4.3% Asian, 0.3% Pacific Islander, 0.1% non-Hispanic from some other race, 3.5% from two or more races and 12.3% Hispanic or Latino.

=== 2000 census ===
In 2000 there were 1,016 households, and 685 families residing in the city. The population density was 341.9 inhabitants per square mile (132.0/km^{2}). There were 1,083 housing units at an average density of 143.3 per square mile (55.3/km^{2}). The racial makeup of the city was 83.21% White, 0.89% Black or African American, 1.70% Native American, 5.65% Asian, 0.43% Pacific Islander, 5.88% from other races, and 2.24% from two or more races. 15.98% of the population were Hispanic or Latino of any race.

There were 1,016 households, out of which 37.3% had children under the age of 18 living with them, 54.7% were married couples living together, 9.1% had a female householder with no husband present, and 32.5% were non-families. 26.9% of all households were made up of individuals, and 3.4% had someone living alone who was 65 years of age or older. The average household size was 2.52 and the average family size was 3.06.

In the city, the population was spread out, with 27.7% under the age of 18, 16.3% from 18 to 24, 33.2% from 25 to 44, 16.5% from 45 to 64, and 6.4% who were 65 years of age or older. The median age was 28 years. For every 100 females, there were 109.3 males. For every 100 females age 18 and over, there were 107.1 males.

The median income for a household in the city was $32,768, and the median income for a family was $38,456. Males had a median income of $28,661 versus $21,708 for females. The per capita income for the city was $16,447. About 10.2% of families and 13.1% of the population were below the poverty line, including 17.4% of those under age 18 and 3.4% of those age 65 or over.

== Education ==
Public education for elementary and secondary students within the majority of Little Flock is provided by Rogers Public Schools. Small sections of Little Flock are zoned to Bentonville School District and Pea Ridge School District.

The Bentonville district portion is zoned to the following schools: Apple Glen Elementary School, Ruth Barker Middle School, Washington Junior High School, and Bentonville High School.
