= Pea Ridge National Military Park =

Historic site in Arkansas, United States

Coordinates: 36°27′15.″N 94°02′04.9″W

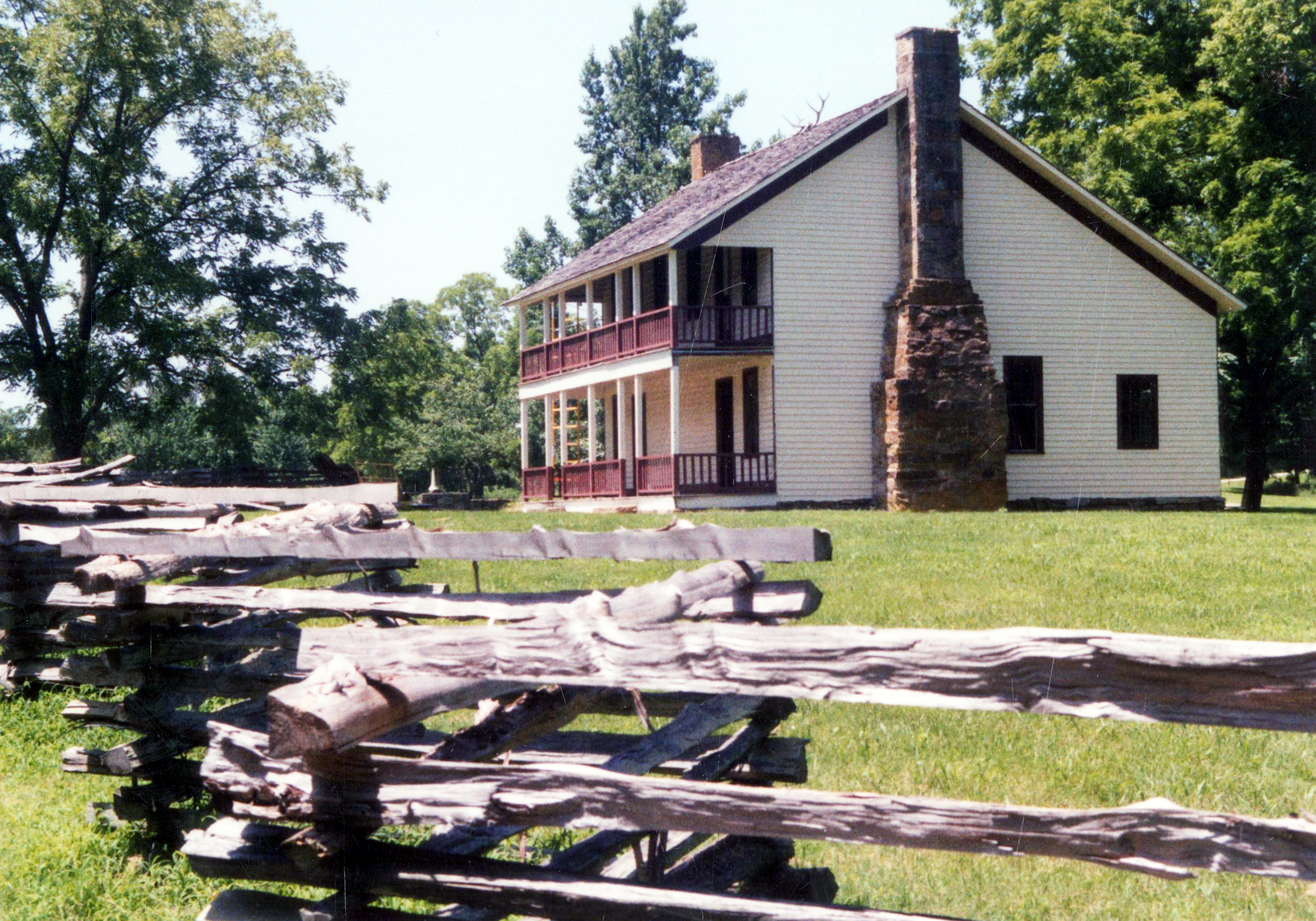
- Elkhorn Tavern at Pea Ridge National Military Park

- Location within Arkansas Location within the United States
- Location: Benton County, Arkansas, United States
- Nearest city: Garfield
- Coordinates: 36°27′15.″N 94°02′04.9″W
- Area: 4,300 acres (17 km^{2})
- Established: July 20, 1956
- Visitors: 80,455 (in 2020)
- Governing body: National Park Service
- Website: Pea Ridge National Military Park

U.S. Historic district

U.S. National Register of Historic Places
- Designated: October 15, 1966
- Reference no.: 66000199

Pea Ridge National Military Park is a United States National Military Park located in northwest Arkansas near the Missouri border. The park protects the site of the Battle of Pea Ridge, fought March 7 and 8, 1862. The battle was a victory for the Union and helped it gain control of the crucial border state of Missouri.

== Administrative history ==
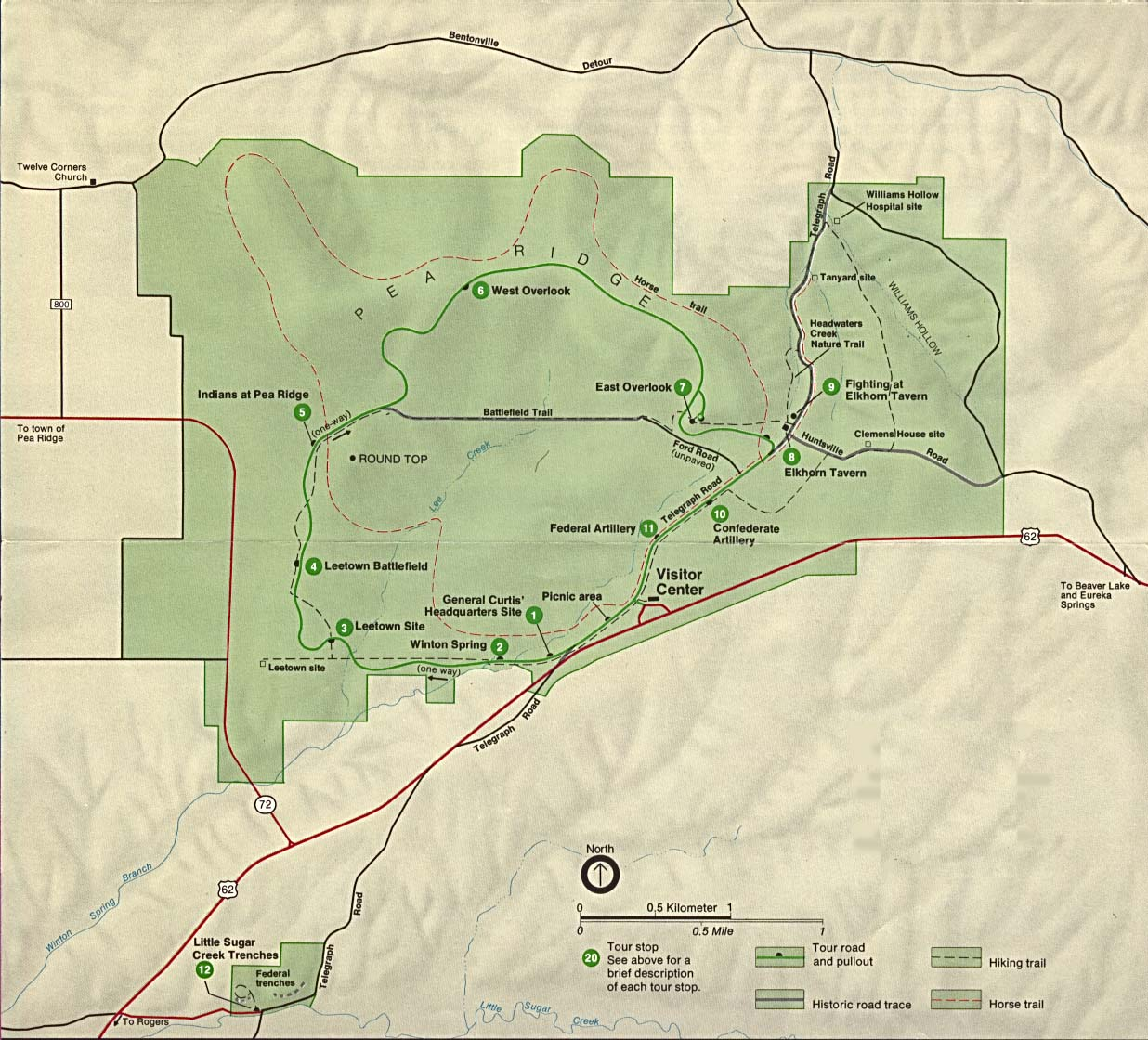
Pea Ridge area National Park Service map

The 4,300-acre (17 km^{2}) Pea Ridge National Military Park was created by an act of Congress in 1956 to preserve the battlefield of the 1862 Battle of Pea Ridge. It was dedicated as a national park during the American Civil War Centennial in 1963.

In 1956, the Arkansas congressional delegation proposed legislation to make Pea Ridge a national military park. This was a significant breakthrough in American Civil War battlefield preservation. At that time, under the National Park Service classification system, only 1-acre (4,000 m^{2}) should have been preserved, along with a monument. On July 20, 1956, Congress enacted legislation to accept a 5,000-acre (20 km^{2}) donation from the state of Arkansas.

In acquiring the land for the park, the government purchased or used eminent domain on dozens of farms and residences of various sizes, ranging from a few acres to the large Winton Springs estate. Many houses and structures were sold and moved off of park property, including some standing in nearby Pea Ridge. The park demolished all remaining structures, including the elaborate Winton Springs mansion, except for the historic Elkhorn Tavern.

Many Union and Confederate veterans attended several reunions at the Pea Ridge battlefield long before it was a park. The first reunions were held in 1887, twenty-five years after the battle. The reunions promoted both remembrance and healing between the soldiers in each army. The veterans dedicated the first battlefield monuments to the Union and Confederate dead. Historian David W. Blight notes in his book Race and Reunion that in such postwar reconciliation, outstanding issues related to the condition and future of freedmen and racial justice were overlooked. These monuments are still located within the park today.

== Visiting the park ==
The park is acknowledged as one of the best-preserved Civil War battlefields. The park features a visitor center and museum, a driving tour, the restored battlefields, hiking trails, a portion of the pre-war Old Telegraph/Wire Road, approximately 2.5 miles (4.0 km) of the Trail of Tears as followed by some members of the Cherokee Nation, and the restored Elkhorn Tavern, which was the epicenter of much of the battle.

== See also ==
- National Register of Historic Places listings in Benton County, Arkansas
