= Pea Ridge High School =

Location
- 781 West Pickens Road; Pea Ridge, Arkansas 72751; United States; 36°27′25″N 94°7′54″W

Information
- School type: Public comprehensive
- Motto: "Proud to be a Blackhawk!"
- Established: 1880 (146 years ago)
- Status: Open
- School district: Pea Ridge School District
- CEEB code: 041995
- NCES School ID: 050303000072
- Principal: Leonard Ogden
- Teaching staff: 38.33 (on FTE basis)
- Grades: 7–12
- Enrollment: 580 (2023-2024)
  - Grade 9: 186
  - Grade 10: 173
  - Grade 11: 184
  - Grade 12: 157
- Student to teacher ratio: 15.13
- Education system: ADE Smart Core
- Classes offered: Regular, Advanced Placement (AP)
- Colors: Black, red, and white
- Song: Hail, mighty Blackhawk
- Athletics conference: 4A Region 1
- Mascot: Blackhawk
- Nickname: The Ridge
- Team name: Pea Ridge Blackhawks
- Rival: Gravette
- Accreditation: ADE; AdvancED (1993–)
- Yearbook: The Blackhawk
- Feeder schools: Pea Ridge Middle School (6–8)
- Affiliation: NWACC; NTI
- Website: prhs.pearidgek12.com

Pea Ridge High School is a comprehensive public high school located in the fringe town of Pea Ridge, Arkansas, United States. The school provides secondary education for students in grades 10 through 12. It is one of nine public high schools in Benton County, Arkansas and the sole high school administered by the Pea Ridge School District.

== Academics ==
Pea Ridge High School is accredited by the Arkansas Department of Education (ADE) and has been accredited by AdvancED since 1997. The assumed course of study follows the Smart Core curriculum developed by the ADE, which requires students complete at least 22 units prior to graduation. Students complete regular coursework and exams and may take Advanced Placement (AP) courses and exams with the opportunity to receive college credit. Additionally, Pea Ridge offers articulated college credit with Northwest Arkansas Community College (NWACC) and Northwest Technical Institute (NTI) through vocational programs.

== Athletics ==
The Pea Ridge High School mascot and athletic emblem is the Blackhawks with red, black and white serving as the school colors.

The Pea Ridge Blackhawks compete in interscholastic activities within the 4A Classification via the 4A Region 1 Conference, as administered by the Arkansas Activities Association. The Blackhawks field teams in football, cross country (boys/girls), basketball (boys/girls), track and field (boys/girls), baseball, softball, and cheer. State Titles include: Baseball: 1985 Golf: 2007 (Justin Doherty) Cross Country: 1989 Cheerleading: 2011, 2013, 2014, 2015
