= Garfield, Arkansas =

- Town
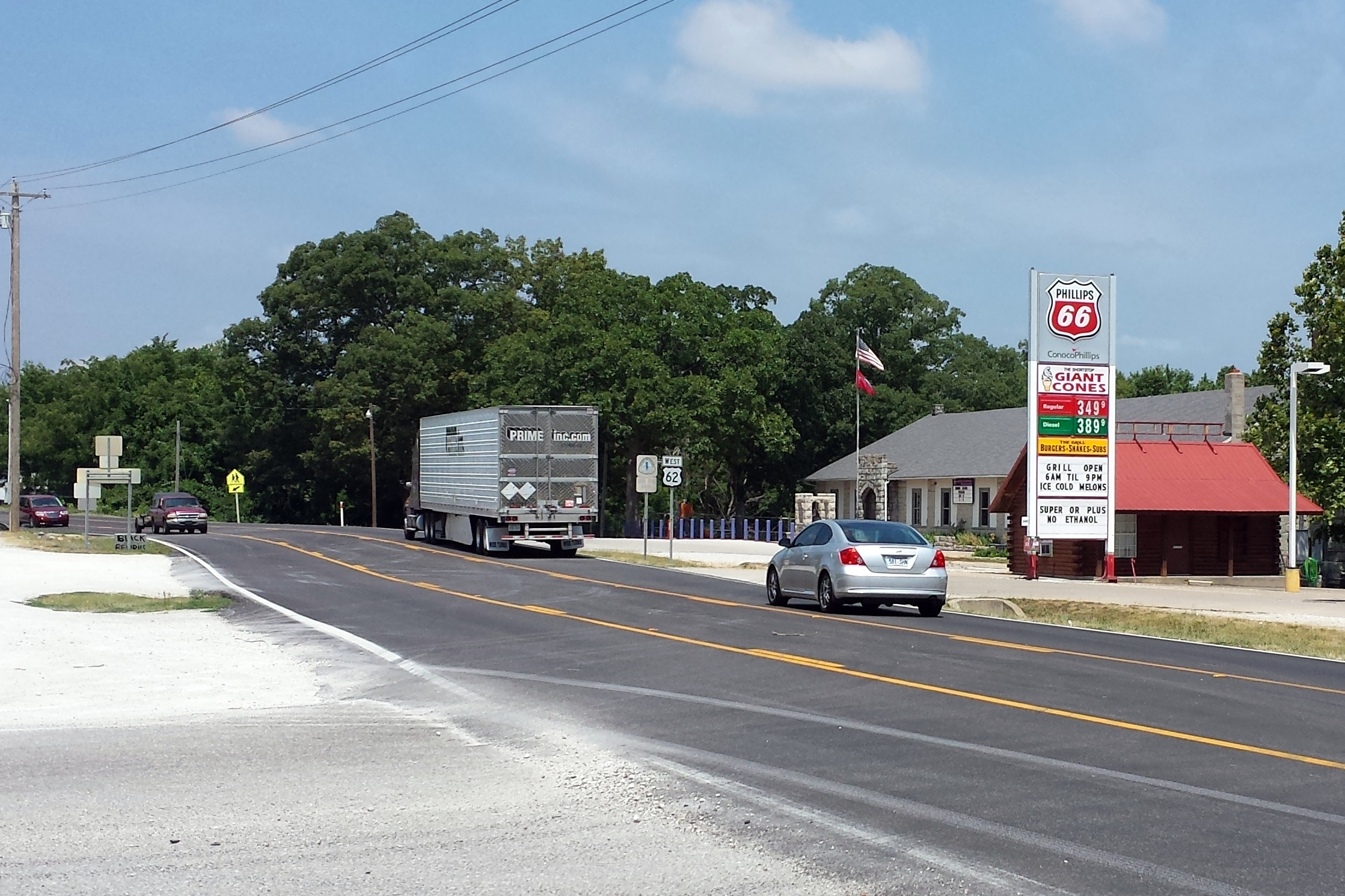
- Highway 62 runs through Garfield

- Seal

- Location of Garfield in Benton County, Arkansas.
- Coordinates: 36°27′1″N 93°58′25″W
- Country: United States
- State: Arkansas
- County: Benton

Area
  - Total: 3.09 sq mi (8.01 km^{2})
  - Land: 3.09 sq mi (8.01 km^{2})
  - Water: 0 sq mi (0.00 km^{2})
- Elevation: 1,490 ft (450 m)

Population (2020)
  - Total: 593
  - Estimate (2025): 631 ▲
  - Density: 191.9/sq mi (74.08/km^{2})
- Time zone: UTC-6 (Central (CST))
  - Summer (DST): UTC-5 (CDT)
- ZIP code: 72732
- Area code: 479
- FIPS code: 05-25750
- GNIS feature ID: 2406542
- Website: garfieldar.gov

Garfield is a town in Benton County, Arkansas, United States. The population was 593 at the 2020 census. It is part of the Northwest Arkansas region.

== History ==
Garfield was platted in 1883. A post office has been in operation at Garfield since 1887.

== Geography ==
Garfield is located in northeast Benton County at 36°27′1″N 93°58′25″W (36.450152, -93.973519). U.S. Route 62 passes through the town, leading northeast to Gateway near the Missouri border and southwest to Rogers.

According to the United States Census Bureau, the town has a total area of 3.0 square miles (7.7 km^{2}), all land.

== Demographics ==
Historical population
Census	Pop.	Note	%±
1890	112		—
1940	104		—
1950	83		−20.2%
1960	48		−42.2%
1970	163		239.6%
1980	187		14.7%
1990	308		64.7%
2000	490		59.1%
2010	502		2.4%
2020	593		18.1%
2025 (est.)	631	▲	6.4%
U.S. Decennial Census; 2018 Estimate

At the 2000 census, there were 490 people, 177 households and 136 families residing in the town. The population density was 133.5 inhabitants per square mile (51.5/km^{2}). There were 198 housing units at an average density of 54.0 per square mile (20.8/km^{2}). The racial makeup of the town was 97.35% White, 1.43% Native American, 0.61% Asian, and 0.61% from two or more races. 1.43% of the population were Hispanic or Latino of any race.

There were 177 households, of which 37.9% had children under the age of 18 living with them, 67.2% were married couples living together, 6.2% had a female householder with no husband present, and 22.6% were non-families. 18.1% of all households were made up of individuals, and 7.3% had someone living alone who was 65 years of age or older. The average household size was 2.77 and the average family size was 3.18.

29.4% of residents were under the age of 18, 8.4% from 18 to 24, 28.8% from 25 to 44, 20.2% from 45 to 64, and 13.3% who were 65 years of age or older. The median age was 37 years. For every 100 females, there were 109.4 males. For every 100 females age 18 and over, there were 104.7 males.

The median household income was $33,393 and the median family income was $38,750. Males had a median income of $27,031 versus $22,404 for females. The per capita income for the town was $13,159. About 9.8% of families and 10.3% of the population were below the poverty line, including 9.0% of those under age 18 and 3.8% of those age 65 or over.

== Education ==
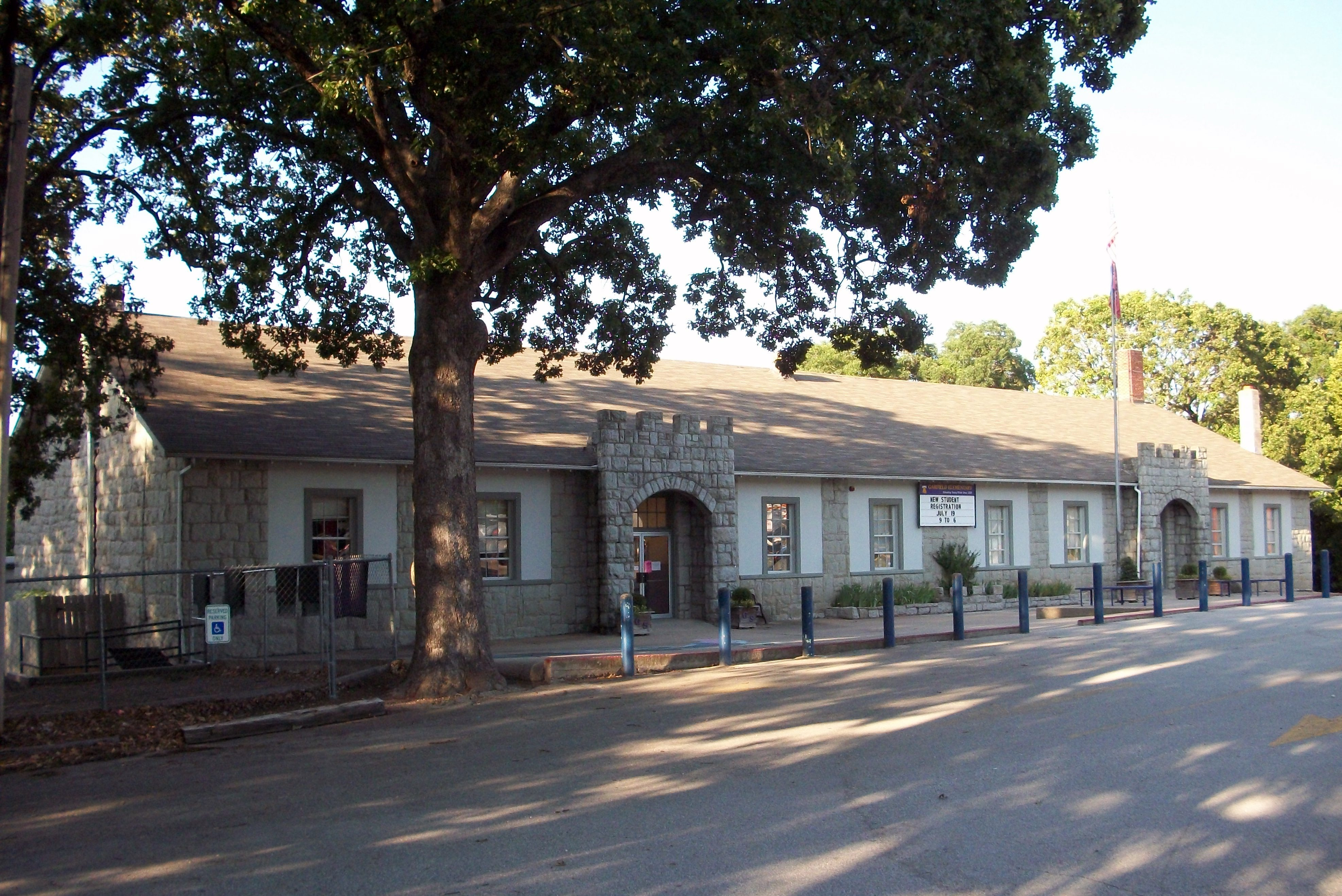
Garfield Elementary School is listed on the National Register of Historic Places.

Public education for early childhood, elementary and secondary school students in most of Garfield is provided by the Rogers School District. A northern portion is within the Pea Ridge School District. The former school district operates Garfield Elementary School, and this school feeds into Lingle Middle School and Rogers Heritage High School. The latter school district operates Pea Ridge High School.
