= Bentonville High School =

Location
- 1801 SE J Street; Bentonville, Arkansas 72712; United States; 36°21′2″N 94°11′44″W

Information
- Type: Public
- Motto: "Cognito pro vita" (Learning for life)
- Established: 1910 (116 years ago)
- School district: Bentonville Public Schools
- NCES District ID: 0503060
- CEEB code: 040175
- NCES School ID: 050306000073
- Principal: Jeff Wasem
- Faculty: 288.82 (on an FTE basis)
- Grades: 9–12
- Enrollment: 3,424 (2023–2024)
- Student to teacher ratio: 11.86
- Colors: Black, white, and Vegas gold
- Athletics conference: 7A West
- Nickname: Tigers
- Website: www.bentonvillek12.org/o/bhs
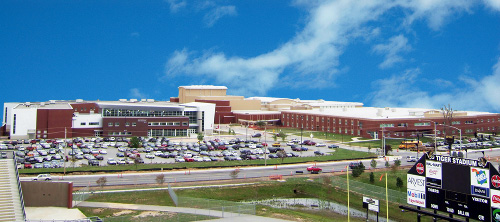

Bentonville High School (BHS) is a public high school in Bentonville, Arkansas, United States Founded in 1910, the school provides education for students in grades nine through twelve. It is one of two high schools of the Bentonville School District.

Communities zoned to Bentonville High include: much of north-east Bentonville, most of Cave Springs, much of Bella Vista, and small sections of Gravette, Little Flock, Rogers, and Springdale.

The school consists of two buildings. A football stadium for the school sits adjacent. An additional campus for the district's professional studies program, Ignite, is located nearby.

== Alumni ==
- Doug McMillon, CEO of Walmart
- Malik Monk, NBA player
- Chas Nimrod, college football player

== See also ==
- Old High Middle School (Bentonville, Arkansas), the old high school building, listed on the National Register of Historic Places
