= National Register of Historic Places listings in Benton County, Arkansas =

Location of Benton County in Arkansas

This is a list of the National Register of Historic Places listings in Benton County, Arkansas.

This is intended to be a complete list of the properties and districts on the National Register of Historic Places in Benton County, Arkansas, United States. The locations of National Register properties and districts, for which the latitude and longitude coordinates are included below, may be seen in a map.

There are 136 properties and districts listed on the National Register in the county. Another 126 properties were once listed but have been removed.

Contents: Counties in Arkansas
- Arkansas
- Ashley
- Baxter
- Benton
- Boone
- Bradley
- Calhoun
- Carroll
- Chicot
- Clark
- Clay
- Cleburne
- Cleveland
- Columbia
- Conway
- Craighead
- Crawford
- Crittenden
- Cross
- Dallas
- Desha
- Drew
- Faulkner
- Franklin
- Fulton
- Garland
- Grant
- Greene
- Hempstead
- Hot Spring
- Howard
- Independence
- Izard
- Jackson
- Jefferson
- Johnson
- Lafayette
- Lawrence
- Lee
- Lincoln
- Little River
- Logan
- Lonoke
- Madison
- Marion
- Miller
- Mississippi
- Monroe
- Montgomery
- Nevada
- Newton
- Ouachita
- Perry
- Phillips
- Pike
- Poinsett
- Polk
- Pope
- Prairie
- Pulaski (Little Rock)
- Randolph
- St. Francis
- Saline
- Scott
- Searcy
- Sebastian
- Sevier
- Sharp
- Stone
- Union
- Van Buren
- Washington
- White
- Woodruff
- Yell

This National Park Service list is complete through NPS recent listings posted October 9, 2026.

== Current listings ==
	Name on the Register	Image	Date listed	Location	City or town	Description
1	Adar House	Adar House	March 25, 1988 (#87002358)	Off Highway 59; 36°29′30″N 94°28′30″W	Sulphur Springs	
2	Alden House	Alden House	January 28, 1988 (#87002378)	Route 1; 36°17′24″N 94°16′23″W	Bentonville	
3	Alfrey-Brown House	Alfrey-Brown House	October 4, 1984 (#84000003)	1001 S. Washington St. 36°10′25″N 94°32′11″W	Siloam Springs	
4	Applegate Drugstore	Applegate Drugstore	June 23, 1982 (#82002095)	116 1st St. 36°19′57″N 94°06′58″W	Rogers	
5	Bank of Gentry	Bank of Gentry	January 28, 1988 (#87002416)	Main St. 36°16′03″N 94°28′58″W	Gentry	
6	Bank of Rogers Building	Bank of Rogers Building	June 23, 1980 (#80000773)	114 S. 1st St. 36°19′57″N 94°06′58″W	Rogers	
7	Banks House	Banks House	January 28, 1988 (#87002365)	Highway 72, west of Hiwasse; 36°25′55″N 94°20′48″W	Hiwasse	
8	Fred Bartell House	Fred Bartell House	January 28, 1988 (#87002429)	324 E. Twin Springs St. 36°10′57″N 94°32′19″W	Siloam Springs	
9	Beasley Homestead	Beasley Homestead	January 28, 1988 (#87002375)	U.S. Highway 71B; 36°13′11″N 94°08′12″W	Bethel Heights	
10	Bella Vista Village Country Club		January 13, 2021 (#100006021)	98 Clubhouse Dr. 36°28′47″N 94°15′31″W	Bella Vista	
11	Bella Vista Water Tank	Bella Vista Water Tank	August 14, 1992 (#92000985)	Junction of Cunningham Dr. and Cedar Crest Dr. 36°25′43″N 94°14′47″W	Bella Vista	1920s stone tank
12	Benton County Courthouse	Benton County Courthouse	January 28, 1988 (#87002340)	106 SE. A St. 36°22′21″N 94°12′27″W	Bentonville	
13	Benton County Jail	Benton County Jail	January 28, 1988 (#87002334)	212 N. Main St. 36°22′25″N 94°12′30″W	Bentonville	
14	Benton County National Bank	Benton County National Bank	September 1, 1983 (#83001156)	123 W. Central; 36°22′19″N 94°12′34″W	Bentonville	NRHP listing says located in "Benton City", but both address and coordinates point to a block in downtown Bentonville just off the town square.
15	Benton County Poor Farm Cemetery	Benton County Poor Farm Cemetery	May 20, 2008 (#08000431)	Western side of NE. Young Ave., approximately 200 feet north of NE. Carnahan Ct. 36°23′27″N 94°11′58″W	Bentonville	
16	Bentonville Confederate Monument	Bentonville Confederate Monument	April 26, 1996 (#96000459)	Public Sq. Park., near the junction of 2nd and Main Sts. 36°22′19″N 94°12′25″W	Bentonville	
17	Bentonville High School	Bentonville High School	January 28, 1988 (#87002339)	410 N.W. 2nd St. 36°22′25″N 94°12′49″W	Bentonville	Built in 1928; Spanish Colonial, Mission and Mediterranean style elements; currently known as Old High Middle School
18	Bentonville Post Office		January 10, 2025 (#100011312)	201 N.E. 2nd Street; 36°22′23″N 94°12′28″W	Bentonville	
19	Bentonville Third Street Historic District	Bentonville Third Street Historic District	November 12, 1993 (#93001202)	Roughly 3rd St., SE. from Main St. to C St., SE. 36°22′10″N 94°12′25″W	Bentonville	
20	Bentonville Train Station	Bentonville Train Station	January 28, 1988 (#87002337)	414 S. Main St. 36°22′01″N 94°12′33″W	Bentonville	
21	Bentonville West Central Avenue Historic District	Bentonville West Central Avenue Historic District	October 22, 1992 (#92001349)	W. Central Ave. between SW. A and SW. G Sts. 36°22′20″N 94°12′54″W	Bentonville	
22	Blackburn House	Blackburn House	January 28, 1988 (#87002402)	220 N. 4th St. 36°20′06″N 94°07′11″W	Rogers	
23	Bogan Cabin		January 28, 1988 (#87002352)	Cedarcrest Mountain; 36°25′40″N 94°14′02″W	Bella Vista	
24	Bogart Hardware Building	Bogart Hardware Building	January 28, 1988 (#87002329)	112 E. Central; 36°22′20″N 94°12′29″W	Bentonville	
25	Bolin Barn and Smokehouse	Bolin Barn and Smokehouse	January 28, 1988 (#87002359)	Southeast of Gravette on Spavinaw Creek Rd. 36°23′55″N 94°23′11″W	Gravette	
26	Braithwaite House	Braithwaite House	January 28, 1988 (#87002314)	Old Bella Vista Highway; 36°23′23″N 94°13′02″W	Bentonville	
27	Bratt-Smiley House	Bratt-Smiley House	January 28, 1988 (#87002428)	University and Broadway; 36°11′13″N 94°32′26″W	Siloam Springs	
28	Breedlove House and Water Tower	Breedlove House and Water Tower	January 28, 1988 (#87002326)	Route 4; 36°22′13″N 94°10′37″W	Bentonville	
29	Camp Crowder Gymnasium	Camp Crowder Gymnasium	September 23, 2011 (#11000685)	205 Shiloh Dr. 36°28′44″N 94°27′27″W	Sulphur Springs	
30	Campbell House	Campbell House	January 28, 1988 (#87002391)	714 W. 3rd St. 36°19′38″N 94°07′10″W	Rogers	
31	Carl House	Carl House	January 28, 1988 (#87002422)	70 Main St. 36°16′02″N 94°29′06″W	Gentry	
32	Carl's Addition Historic District	Carl's Addition Historic District	July 17, 1997 (#97000791)	Along S. College, W. Alpine, and S. Wright Sts., bounded by Sager Creek and W. Twin Springs Ave. 36°11′01″N 94°32′33″W	Siloam Springs	
33	Carpenter Building	Carpenter Building	May 18, 2018 (#100002447)	136 E Main; 36°16′03″N 94°29′00″W	Gentry	
34	Coal Gap School	Coal Gap School	September 4, 1992 (#92001123)	County Road 920; 36°21′55″N 93°55′26″W	Larue	
35	Coats School	Coats School	January 28, 1988 (#87002370)	Spavinaw Creek Rd. 36°21′08″N 94°34′04″W	Maysville	
36	Connelly-Harrington House	Connelly-Harrington House	January 28, 1988 (#87002386)	115 E. University; 36°11′14″N 94°32′26″W	Siloam Springs	
37	Coon Creek Bridge	Coon Creek Bridge	January 24, 2007 (#06001264)	County Road 24; 36°19′29″N 94°33′14″W	Cherokee City	
38	Council Grove Methodist Church	Council Grove Methodist Church	January 28, 1988 (#87002377)	Osage Mills Rd. 36°16′53″N 94°16′05″W	Osage Mills	
39	Charles R. Craig Building	Charles R. Craig Building	September 27, 2003 (#03000957)	113 S. Main St. 36°22′16″N 94°12′30″W	Bentonville	
40	Craig-Bryan House	Craig-Bryan House	January 28, 1988 (#87002320)	307 W. Central; 36°22′19″N 94°12′44″W	Bentonville	
41	Duckworth-Williams House	Duckworth-Williams House	January 28, 1988 (#87002385)	103 S. College; 36°11′06″N 94°32′34″W	Siloam Springs	
42	Elliott House	Elliott House	January 20, 1978 (#78000573)	303 SE. 3rd St. 36°22′11″N 94°12′17″W	Bentonville	
43	First National Bank	First National Bank	January 28, 1988 (#87002431)	109 E. University; 36°11′10″N 94°32′26″W	Siloam Springs	
44	Freeman-Felker House	Freeman-Felker House	January 28, 1988 (#87002399)	318 W. Elm St. 36°19′55″N 94°07′11″W	Rogers	
45	Gailey Hollow Farmstead	Gailey Hollow Farmstead	January 28, 1988 (#87002381)	¼ mile east of the Logan intersection 36°12′42″N 94°22′56″W	Logan	
46	Garfield Elementary School	Garfield Elementary School	June 28, 1996 (#96000693)	18432 Marshall St. 36°26′55″N 93°58′17″W	Garfield	
47	Gentry Grand Army of the Republic Monument		January 26, 2016 (#100001990)	NE Sec. of Gentry Cemetery, Pioneer Ln. 36°15′14″N 94°29′39″W	Gentry	
48	German Builder's House	German Builder's House	January 28, 1988 (#87002426)	315 E. Central; 36°11′07″N 94°32′20″W	Siloam Springs	
49	Goforth-Saindon Mound Group		January 23, 1986 (#86000099)	Address Restricted	Siloam Springs	
50	Grand Army of the Republic Memorial	Grand Army of the Republic Memorial	May 3, 1996 (#96000506)	Southern end of Twin Springs Park, east of the junction of Highway 43 and Twin Springs St. 36°10′59″N 94°32′25″W	Siloam Springs	
51	Gypsy Camp Historic District	Gypsy Camp Historic District	January 28, 1988 (#87002425)	Off Highway 59; 36°06′44″N 94°32′15″W	Siloam Springs	
52	Hagler-Cole Cabin	Hagler-Cole Cabin	January 28, 1988 (#87002342)	Mt. Pisqua Dr. 36°25′45″N 94°13′25″W	Bella Vista	
53	Henry Furniture Store Building	Henry Furniture Store Building	July 15, 1994 (#94000725)	107 W. University; 36°11′10″N 94°32′30″W	Siloam Springs	
54	Henry House	Henry House	January 28, 1988 (#87002327)	302 SE. 2nd St. 36°22′16″N 94°12′21″W	Bentonville	
55	Highfill School (No. 71)	Highfill School (No. 71)	January 26, 2018 (#100001991)	11978 Highfill Ave. 36°15′30″N 94°21′02″W	Highfill	
56	Hiwasse Bank Building	Hiwasse Bank Building	January 28, 1988 (#87002366)	Main St., Highway 279; 36°25′53″N 94°20′02″W	Hiwasse	Demolished or extensively renovated. Photo shows building currently on the site.
57	House at 305 E. Ashley	House at 305 E. Ashley	January 28, 1988 (#87002427)	305 E. Ashley; 36°11′13″N 94°32′16″W	Siloam Springs	
58	Illinois River Bridge	Illinois River Bridge	January 19, 2005 (#04001503)	County Road 196 (Kincheloe Rd.) approximately 0.25 miles south of Old Highway 68; 36°10′39″N 94°23′31″W	Pedro	
59	Illinois River Bridge	Illinois River Bridge	January 28, 1988 (#87002420)	6 miles east of Siloam Springs; 36°09′59″N 94°26′01″W	Siloam Springs	
60	Jackson House	Jackson House	January 28, 1988 (#87002331)	207 W. Central; 36°22′19″N 94°12′40″W	Bentonville	
61	James House	James House	January 28, 1988 (#87002332)	CR 51; 36°18′27″N 94°12′29″W	Rogers	
62	Jones House	Jones House	January 28, 1988 (#87002363)	220 Bush St. 36°28′48″N 94°27′34″W	Sulphur Springs	
63	Charles Juhre House	Charles Juhre House	February 25, 1993 (#93000091)	406 N. 4th St. 36°20′12″N 94°07′10″W	Rogers	
64	Kansas City Southern Railway Caboose No. 383	Kansas City Southern Railway Caboose No. 383	September 23, 2010 (#10000782)	Northwest of the Arkansas Highway 72 and Arkansas Highway 59 intersection 36°25′17″N 94°27′12″W	Gravette	
65	Kansas City Southern Railway Locomotive #73D and Caboose #385	Kansas City Southern Railway Locomotive #73D and Caboose #385	February 21, 2006 (#06000072)	Highway 59 south of Church Ave. 36°20′13″N 94°27′40″W	Decatur	
66	Kansas City-Southern Depot-Decatur	Kansas City-Southern Depot-Decatur	June 11, 1992 (#92000606)	Highway 59; 36°20′07″N 94°27′39″W	Decatur	
67	Kefauver House	Kefauver House	January 28, 1988 (#87002405)	224 W. Cherry St. 36°19′47″N 94°07′08″W	Rogers	
68	Kindley House	Kindley House	January 28, 1988 (#87002356)	503 Charlotte St. 36°25′09″N 94°26′52″W	Gravette	
69	Lakeside Hotel	Lakeside Hotel	November 15, 1979 (#79000432)	119 West University Street; 36°11′10″N 94°32′30″W	Siloam Springs	
70	Lamberton Cabin	Lamberton Cabin	January 28, 1988 (#87002343)	8 N. Mountain; 36°26′07″N 94°13′30″W	Bella Vista	
71	Lane Hotel	Lane Hotel	January 28, 1988 (#87002411)	121 W. Poplar St. 36°19′52″N 94°07′02″W	Rogers	
72	Linebarger House	Linebarger House	January 28, 1988 (#87002335)	606 W. Central; 36°22′21″N 94°12′58″W	Bentonville	
73	Macon-Harrison House	Macon-Harrison House	January 28, 1988 (#87002333)	209 NE. 2nd St. 36°22′23″N 94°12′21″W	Bentonville	
74	Massey Hotel	Massey Hotel	December 1, 1978 (#78000574)	U.S. Highway 71B; 36°22′19″N 94°12′35″W	Bentonville	
75	Maxwell-Hinman House	Maxwell-Hinman House	January 28, 1988 (#87002322)	902 N.W. 2nd St. 36°22′23″N 94°13′18″W	Bentonville	
76	Maxwell-Sweet House	Maxwell-Sweet House	January 28, 1988 (#87002388)	114 S. College; 36°11′05″N 94°32′35″W	Siloam Springs	
77	McCleod House	McCleod House	January 28, 1988 (#87002355)	6406 S Mills Ln; 36°16′05″N 94°09′50″W	Rogers	
78	Merrill House	Merrill House	January 28, 1988 (#87002404)	617 S. 6th 36°19′42″N 94°07′22″W	Rogers	
79	Miller Homestead	Miller Homestead	January 28, 1988 (#87002362)	½ mile east of Highway 94; 36°26′29″N 94°06′17″W	Pea Ridge	
80	Mitchell House	Mitchell House	January 28, 1988 (#87002423)	115 N. Nelson; 36°16′09″N 94°28′55″W	Gentry	
81	Mitchell-Ward House	Mitchell-Ward House	June 1, 2005 (#05000486)	201 N. Nelson; 36°16′16″N 94°29′04″W	Gentry	
82	Monte Ne	Monte Ne	February 17, 1978 (#78000575)	Off Highway 94; 36°16′59″N 94°04′22″W	Monte Ne	
83	Mt. Hebron M.E. Church South and Cemetery	Mt. Hebron M.E. Church South and Cemetery	September 27, 2003 (#03000958)	1079 Mt. Hebron Rd. 36°16′33″N 94°11′43″W	Colville	
84	Mutual Aid Union Building	Mutual Aid Union Building	October 14, 1976 (#76000385)	2nd and Poplar Sts. 36°19′53″N 94°07′04″W	Rogers	
85	Myler House	Myler House	January 28, 1988 (#87002393)	315 N. 3rd St. 36°20′08″N 94°07′05″W	Rogers	
86	New Home School and Church	New Home School and Church	January 28, 1988 (#87002357)	South of Bella Vista on McKisic Creek Rd. 36°24′53″N 94°13′42″W	Bella Vista	
87	Norwood School	Norwood School	January 28, 1988 (#87002384)	Norwood Rd. and Highway 16; 36°07′05″N 94°27′58″W	Norwood	
88	Oak Hill Mausoleum	Oak Hill Mausoleum	December 6, 1996 (#96001412)	Oak Hill Cemetery, west of the junction of Benton St. and Highway 43; 36°11′16″N 94°33′38″W	Siloam Springs	
89	Oklahoma Row Hotel Site	Oklahoma Row Hotel Site	May 20, 1992 (#91001668)	Highway 94S at the shores of Beaver Lake; 36°17′08″N 94°04′11″W	Monte Ne	
90	Osage Mills Dam	Osage Mills Dam	January 28, 1988 (#87002376)	North of Osage Mills on Little Osage Creek; 36°17′40″N 94°16′03″W	Osage Mills	
91	Parks-Reagan House	Parks-Reagan House	January 28, 1988 (#87002395)	410 W. Poplar St. 36°19′52″N 94°07′15″W	Rogers	
92	Pea Ridge Commercial Historic District	Pea Ridge Commercial Historic District	May 22, 2007 (#07000445)	Pickens St. roughly between Greene and Davis Sts., and Curtis Ave. roughly between Pike and Macintosh Sts. 36°27′20″N 94°06′52″W	Pea Ridge	
93	Pea Ridge National Military Park	Pea Ridge National Military Park	October 15, 1966 (#66000199)	U.S. Highway 62; 36°26′12″N 94°01′35″W	Pea Ridge	
94	Col. Samuel W. Peel House	Col. Samuel W. Peel House	May 4, 1995 (#95000571)	400 S. Walton Boulevard; 36°22′09″N 94°13′18″W	Bentonville	
95	Pharr Cabin	Pharr Cabin	January 28, 1988 (#87002346)	2 N. Mountain; 36°26′07″N 94°13′40″W	Bella Vista	
96	Pinkston-Mays Store Building	Pinkston-Mays Store Building	January 28, 1988 (#87002367)	107-109 Lackston St. 36°15′24″N 94°07′51″W	Lowell	
97	Princedom Cabin	Princedom Cabin	January 28, 1988 (#87002347)	Lookout Dr. 36°25′39″N 94°13′52″W	Bella Vista	
98	Putman Cemetery	Putman Cemetery	May 24, 2004 (#04000510)	3504 Magellan Boulevard; 36°20′11″N 94°11′17″W	Bentonville	
99	Pyeatte House	Pyeatte House	November 29, 1995 (#95001382)	311 S. Mt. Olive St. 36°10′53″N 94°32′29″W	Siloam Springs	
100	Quell House	Quell House	January 28, 1988 (#87002387)	222 S. Wright; 36°11′01″N 94°32′32″W	Siloam Springs	
101	Railroad Cottage	Railroad Cottage	January 19, 2005 (#04001509)	208 N. Rust; 36°16′16″N 94°29′01″W	Gentry	
102	Raney House	Raney House	January 28, 1988 (#87002403)	1331 Monte Ne; 36°19′10″N 94°06′21″W	Rogers	
103	Reeves House	Reeves House	September 7, 1995 (#95001091)	321 S. Wright St. 36°10′58″N 94°32′30″W	Siloam Springs	
104	Rice House	Rice House	January 28, 1988 (#87002325)	501 NW. A St. 36°22′40″N 94°12′37″W	Bentonville	
105	James A. Rice House	James A. Rice House	November 1, 1984 (#84000177)	204 SE. 3rd St. 36°22′09″N 94°12′28″W	Bentonville	
106	Rife Farmstead	Rife Farmstead	January 28, 1988 (#87002380)	Osage Mills Rd. 36°16′10″N 94°15′57″W	Osage Mills	
107	Rocky Branch School	Rocky Branch School	March 25, 1988 (#87002360)	200 N. Highway 303; 36°19′34″N 93°56′29″W	Prairie Creek	
108	Rogers City Hall	Rogers City Hall	January 28, 1988 (#87002409)	202 W. Elm St. 36°19′55″N 94°07′05″W	Rogers	The old Rogers City Hall, not the modern one at 301 West Chestnut.
109	Rogers Commercial Historic District	Rogers Commercial Historic District	January 28, 1988 (#87002412)	Walnut St.; also roughly bounded by Walnut, 1st, Poplar, and 2nd Sts.; also 120 S. 2nd St.; also 116 S. 2nd St.; also the 300 block of S. 1st St., the 100 block of S. 2nd St., the 200 block of W. Walnut St., and the 200 block of W. Elm St. 36°19′59″N 94°07′00″W	Rogers	Semicolons separate the original boundaries and boundary increases of September 30, 1993, December 9, 1998, October 4, 2002, and October 17, 2012. Originally listed in 1988 as the Walnut Street Historic District; with the first boundary increase, it was renamed the Rogers Commercial Historic District
110	Rogers Post Office Building	Rogers Post Office Building	January 28, 1988 (#87002408)	120 W. Poplar St. 36°19′51″N 94°07′02″W	Rogers	Rogers' main post office building 1917-1940s.
111	Rogers Milk Plant Building		January 24, 2019 (#100003324)	218 W. Birch St. 36°19′26″N 94°07′07″W	Rogers	
112	Roy's Office Supply Building	Roy's Office Supply Building	January 28, 1988 (#87002328)	110 E. Central; 36°22′20″N 94°12′30″W	Bentonville	
113	Simon Sager Cabin	Simon Sager Cabin	January 30, 1976 (#76000386)	John Brown University campus 36°11′28″N 94°33′30″W	Siloam Springs	
114	Shady Grove School	Shady Grove School	January 28, 1988 (#87002361)	Highway 94; 36°28′43″N 94°08′23″W	Pea Ridge	
115	Shaw-Blair House		November 3, 2020 (#100005757)	11976 Tyson Rd. 36°15′21″N 94°02′52″W	Lowell	
116	Shiloh House	Shiloh House	January 28, 1988 (#87002364)	Off Kibler St. 36°28′34″N 94°27′16″W	Sulphur Springs	
117	Shores Warehouse	Shores Warehouse	January 28, 1988 (#87002374)	Main St. 36°15′44″N 94°13′55″W	Cave Springs	
118	Siloam Springs City Park	Siloam Springs City Park	January 28, 1988 (#87002383)	Downtown Siloam Springs; 36°11′06″N 94°32′31″W	Siloam Springs	
119	Siloam Springs Downtown Historic District	Siloam Springs Downtown Historic District	May 26, 1995 (#94001338)	Roughly bounded by Sager Creek, Ashley St., Madison Ave., and Twin Springs St. 36°11′06″N 94°32′25″W	Siloam Springs	
120	Springfield to Fayetteville Road-Cross Hollow Segment	Springfield to Fayetteville Road-Cross Hollow Segment	January 19, 2005 (#04001511)	County Road 83 through Cross Hollow; 36°15′54″N 94°07′03″W	Lowell	
121	Springfield to Fayetteville Road-Elkhorn Tavern Segment	Springfield to Fayetteville Road-Elkhorn Tavern Segment	May 26, 2005 (#05000484)	Northwest of Elkhorn Tavern within Pea Ridge National Park; 36°28′07″N 94°00′41″W	Garfield	
122	Stack Barn		January 28, 1988 (#87002353)	Highway 94S; 36°17′38″N 94°02′57″W	Monte Ne	
123	Stockton Building	Stockton Building	January 28, 1988 (#87002432)	113 N. Broadway; 36°11′08″N 94°32′24″W	Siloam Springs	
124	Stroud House	Stroud House	May 10, 1996 (#96000527)	Southeastern corner of the junction of SE. F St. and E. Central Ave. 36°22′18″N 94°12′04″W	Bentonville	
125	Sulphur Springs Old School Complex Historic District	Sulphur Springs Old School Complex Historic District	February 16, 2001 (#01000113)	512 Black St. 36°28′39″N 94°27′41″W	Sulphur Springs	
126	Sulphur Springs Park Reserve	Sulphur Springs Park Reserve	July 8, 1999 (#99000791)	Highway 59; 36°28′59″N 94°27′21″W	Sulphur Springs	
127	Sutherlin Cabin	Sutherlin Cabin	January 28, 1988 (#87002344)	4 N. Mountain; 36°26′06″N 94°13′39″W	Bella Vista	
128	Terry Block Building	Terry Block Building	May 13, 1982 (#82004613)	101-103 N. Main St. 36°22′21″N 94°12′32″W	Bentonville	
129	Thurmond House	Thurmond House	January 28, 1988 (#87002430)	407 Britt; 36°10′57″N 94°32′03″W	Siloam Springs	
130	Van Winkle's Mill Site	Van Winkle's Mill Site	November 15, 2007 (#07001175)	21392 E. Highway 12; 36°17′04″N 93°54′20″W	Rogers	
131	Vinson House	Vinson House	January 28, 1988 (#87002392)	1016 S. 4th 36°19′28″N 94°07′14″W	Rogers	
132	War Eagle Bridge	War Eagle Bridge	November 19, 1985 (#85003497)	Carries County Road 98 over War Eagle Creek; 36°16′02″N 93°56′35″W	War Eagle	
133	Wasson House	Wasson House	January 28, 1988 (#87002371)	Main St. 36°15′37″N 94°25′30″W	Springtown	
134	Wee Pine Knot	Wee Pine Knot	January 21, 1999 (#98001632)	319 Spring St. 36°29′16″N 94°27′42″W	Sulphur Springs	
135	Wonderland Cave	Wonderland Cave	January 28, 1988 (#87002313)	Dertmoor Rd. 36°26′08″N 94°13′24″W	Bella Vista	
136	Col. Young House	Col. Young House	January 28, 1988 (#87002319)	1007 SE. 5th St. 36°22′04″N 94°11′51″W	Bentonville	

== Former listings ==
	Name on the Register	Image	Date listed	Date removed	Location	City or town	Description
1	Bertschy House	Bertschy House	January 28, 1988 (#87002336)	October 7, 2026	507 N.W. 5th St. 36°22′39″N 94°12′56″W	Bentonville	
2	Blackwell-Paisley Cabin	Blackwell-Paisley Cabin	January 28, 1988 (#87002351)	October 7, 2026	Suits-Us Dr. 36°25′49″N 94°13′59″W	Bella Vista	
3	Blake House		January 28, 1988 (#87002324)	January 26, 2018	211 SE. A St. 36°22′12″N 94°12′26″W	Bentonville	Demolished.
4	Bryan House No. 2	Bryan House No. 2	January 28, 1988 (#87002396)	October 7, 2026	321 E. Locust St. 36°20′07″N 94°06′43″W	Rogers	
5	Daniels House		January 28, 1988 (#87002317)	January 26, 2018	902 E. Central; 36°22′17″N 94°11′57″W	Bentonville	Burned.
6	Deaton Cabin	Deaton Cabin	January 28, 1988 (#87002348)	October 7, 2026	Suits Us Rd. 36°25′49″N 94°13′59″W	Bella Vista	
7	Douglas House		January 28, 1988 (#87002372)	October 7, 2026	8 miles off of Highway 12; 36°15′20″N 94°20′10″W	Vaughn	
8	Drane House		January 28, 1988 (#87002389)	January 26, 2018	1004 S. 1st St. 36°19′24″N 94°07′02″W	Rogers	Burned down by Fire Department after structure became unsafe in 2013.
9	Green Barn		January 28, 1988 (#87002368)	October 7, 2026	McClure St. 36°15′25″N 94°07′27″W	Lowell	Demolition was confirmed by Dr. Gaye Bland, director of the Rogers Historical Museum in 2013.
10	Koons House	Koons House	January 22, 1988 (#87002330)	October 7, 2026	409 5th St. 36°22′39″N 94°12′52″W	Bentonville	
11	Lillard-Sprague House	Lillard-Sprague House	January 28, 1988 (#87002398)	October 7, 2026	Pleasant Grove Rd. 36°17′22″N 94°11′21″W	Rogers	2015 photo show the house destroyed
12	Markey House		January 28, 1988 (#87002354)	October 14, 2026	Route 1; 36°25′39″N 93°57′16″W	Garfield	
13	McIntyre House		January 28, 1988 (#87002382)	October 14, 2026	Logan Rd. 36°12′13″N 94°22′11″W	Logan	
14	Methodist Church		January 28, 1988 (#87002373)	September 24, 2004	AR 112 and AR 264	Cave Springs	
15	Morris House	Morris House	January 28, 1988 (#87002316)	October 14, 2026	407 S.W. 4th St. 36°22′04″N 94°12′48″W	Bentonville	
16	Osage Creek Bridge	Osage Creek Bridge	January 28, 1988 (#87002418)	January 3, 2022	4½ miles north of Tontitown; 36°14′26″N 94°15′12″W	Tontitown	Demolished in 2015 and replaced with new bridge.
17	Piercy Farmstead	Piercy Farmstead	January 28, 1988 (#87002379)	October 14, 2026	Osage Mills Rd. 36°16′25″N 94°16′01″W	Osage Mills	
18	Rife House		January 28, 1988 (#87002406)	October 14, 2026	1515 S. 8th St. 36°19′09″N 94°13′33″W	Rogers	Demolition was confirmed by Dr. Gaye Bland, director of the Rogers Historical Museum in 2013.
19	St. Louis-San Francisco Passenger Depot		August 15, 1977 (#77000243)	June 3, 1986	First and Cherry Sts.	Rogers	
20	Sellers Farm		January 28, 1988 (#87002369)	October 14, 2026	Old highway on the state line 36°24′20″N 94°36′07″W	Maysville	Burned down.
21	Siloam Springs Train Station		January 28, 1988 (#87002413)	March 31, 2000	East Jefferson	Siloam Springs	
22	Smith House	Smith House	November 7, 1996 (#96001273)	October 14, 2026	806 NW. A St. 36°22′51″N 94°12′33″W	Bentonville	
23	Spavinaw Creek Bridge	Spavinaw Creek Bridge	January 28, 1988 (#87002414)	March 31, 2000	4 miles north of Decatur on CR 29	Decatur	Replaced in 1990.
24	Springfield to Fayetteville Road-Brightwater Segment		January 19, 2005 (#04001513)	October 7, 2009	N. Old Wire Rd./County Road 67, south of U.S. Highway 62	Brightwater	
25	Stroud House		January 28, 1988 (#87002400)	January 26, 2018	204 S. 3rd St. 36°19′55″N 94°07′08″W	Rogers	Demolished
26	Sunset Hotel		August 14, 1992 (#92000986)	July 20, 2000	W of US 71	Bella Vista	Destroyed by fire in July, 1999.

== See also ==
- List of National Historic Landmarks in Arkansas
- National Register of Historic Places listings in Arkansas
