= Rife House =

Rife House may refer to:

in the United States (by state then city)

- Rife Farmstead, Osage Mills, Arkansas, listed on the National Register of Historic Places (NRHP) in Benton County
- Rife House (Rogers, Arkansas), listed on the NRHP in Benton County
- Rife House (Shawsville, Virginia), listed on the NRHP in Montgomery County
