= Maxwell-Sweet House =

Historic house in Arkansas, United States

- U.S. National Register of Historic Places
- Location within Arkansas Location within the United States
- Location: 114 S. College, Siloam Springs, Arkansas
- Coordinates: 36°11′5″N 94°32′35″W
- Area: less than one acre
- Built: 1921
- Architectural style: Bungalow/craftsman
- MPS: Benton County MRA
- NRHP reference No.: 87002388
- Added to NRHP: January 28, 1988

The Maxwell-Sweet House is a historic house at 114 South College in Siloam Springs, Arkansas. It is a two-story brick structure, roughly square in shape with a projecting front section. It has a tile hip roof with extended eaves, and a porch that wraps around the front project, supported by brick piers with concrete capitals. The house was built in 1921 by a prominent local banker, who lost both his business and house in 1928. The property includes a period garage and carriage barn.

The house was listed on the National Register of Historic Places in 1988.

== See also ==
- National Register of Historic Places listings in Benton County, Arkansas
