= Daniels House (Bentonville, Arkansas) =

Historic house in Arkansas, United States

- Formerly listed on the U.S. National Register of Historic Places
- Location within Arkansas Location within the United States
- Location: 902 E. Central, Bentonville, Arkansas
- Coordinates: 36°22′17″N 94°11′57″W
- Area: less than one acre
- Built: 1855
- Architectural style: Greek Revival
- MPS: Benton County MRA
- NRHP reference No.: 87002317

Significant dates
- Added to NRHP: January 28, 1988
- Removed from NRHP: January 28, 2018

The Daniels House was a historic house at 902 East Central Street in Bentonville, Arkansas. Built c. 1855, it was one of a small number of antebellum houses to survive in the city. It was a single-story wood-frame structure with a side-gable roof and a Greek Revival tetrastyle portico projecting over its front entrance. The columns supporting the portico were believed to be original, as was the narrow clapboard siding.

The house was listed on the National Register of Historic Places in 1988. It burned down, and was subsequently delisted in 2018.

== See also ==
- National Register of Historic Places listings in Benton County, Arkansas
