= Kefauver House =

Historic house in Arkansas, United States

- U.S. National Register of Historic Places
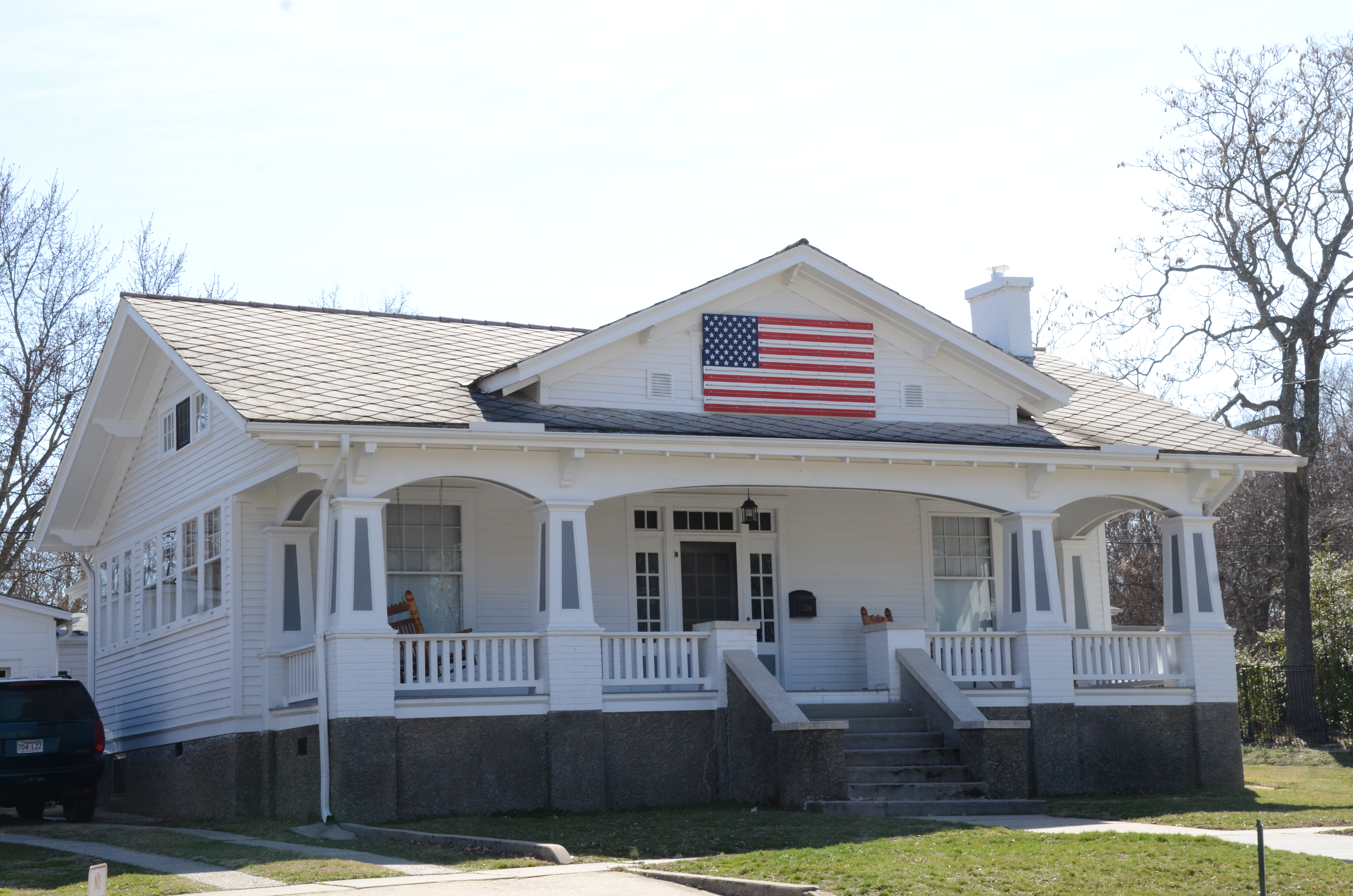

- Location within Arkansas Location within the United States
- Location: 224 W. Cherry St., Rogers, Arkansas
- Coordinates: 36°19′47″N 94°7′8″W
- Area: less than one acre
- Built: 1920
- Architectural style: Bungalow/craftsman
- MPS: Benton County MRA
- NRHP reference No.: 87002405
- Added to NRHP: January 28, 1988

The Kefauver House is a historic house at 224 West Cherry Street in Rogers, Arkansas. Built around 1920 by local businessman W. E. Kefauver, this 1½ story wood-frame structure exemplifies the Bungalow style, with a broad porch supported by tapered square columns, and an arched architrave highlighting the opening where the stairs lead upward. It has hip roof with wide overhangs, and a broad shallow-pitch gabled dormer on the front facade.

The house was listed on the National Register of Historic Places in 1988.

== See also ==
- National Register of Historic Places listings in Benton County, Arkansas
