= Vinson House (Rogers, Arkansas) =

Historic house in Arkansas, United States

- U.S. National Register of Historic Places
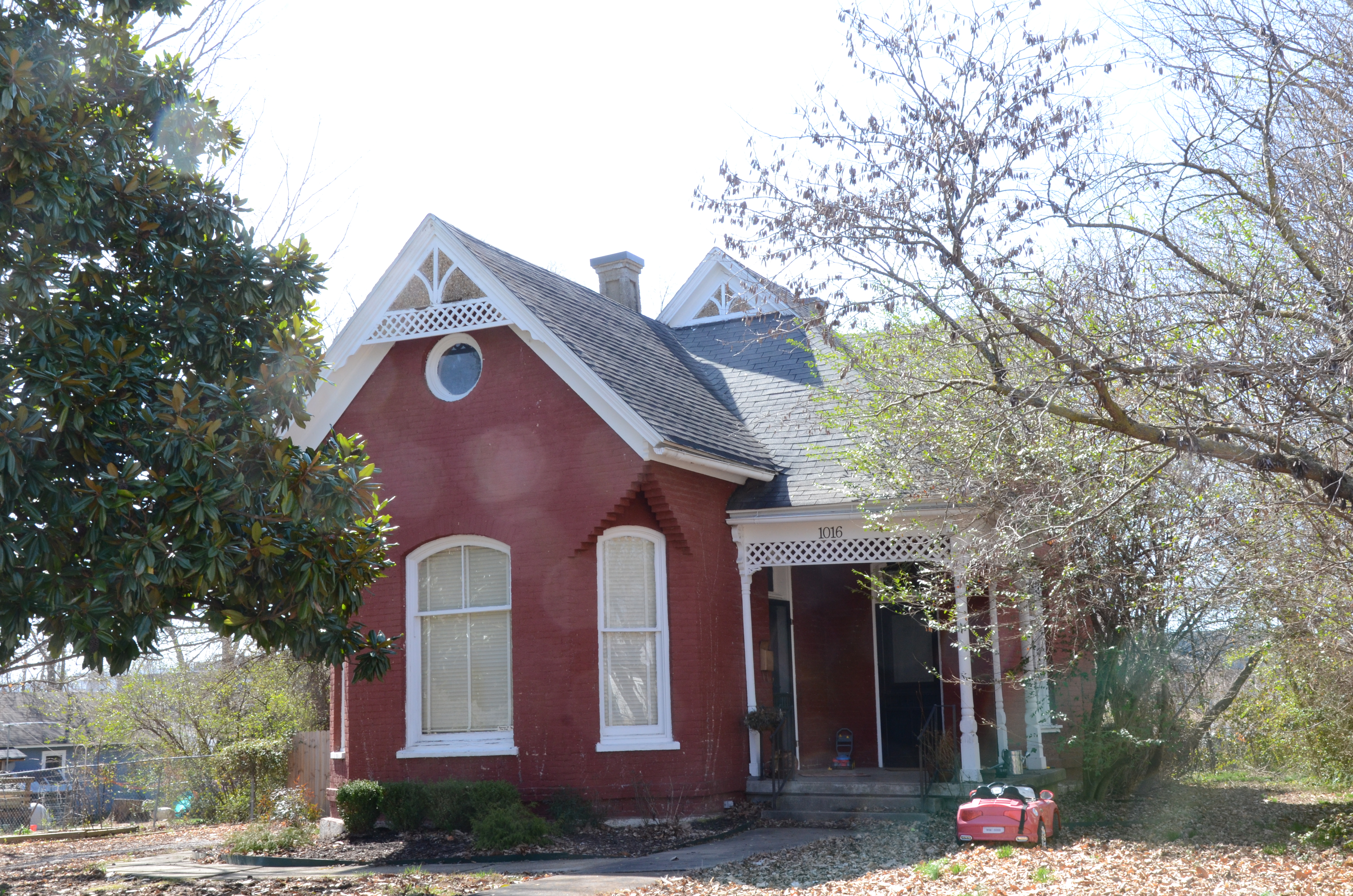

- Location within Arkansas Location within the United States
- Location: 1016 S. Fourth, Rogers, Arkansas
- Coordinates: 36°19′28″N 94°7′14″W
- Area: less than one acre
- Built: 1896
- Architectural style: Stick/eastlake
- MPS: Benton County MRA
- NRHP reference No.: 87002392
- Added to NRHP: January 28, 1988

The Vinson House is a historic house at 1016 South Fourth Street in Rogers, Arkansas. It is a single-story brick structure with high-quality Stick/Eastlake styling. It has a generally cruciform plan with a cross-gable roof, with beveled corners topped by corbelled bracketing, and decorative Stick style woodwork in the gables. The front porch is supported by columns featuring elaborate scrollwork in the capitals. Built in 1896, it was purchased in 1921 by E. W. Vinson, who served as mayor of Rogers 1932–44.

The house was listed on the National Register of Historic Places in 1988.

== See also ==
- National Register of Historic Places listings in Benton County, Arkansas
