= Koons House =

Historic house in Arkansas, US

- Formerly listed on the U.S. National Register of Historic Places
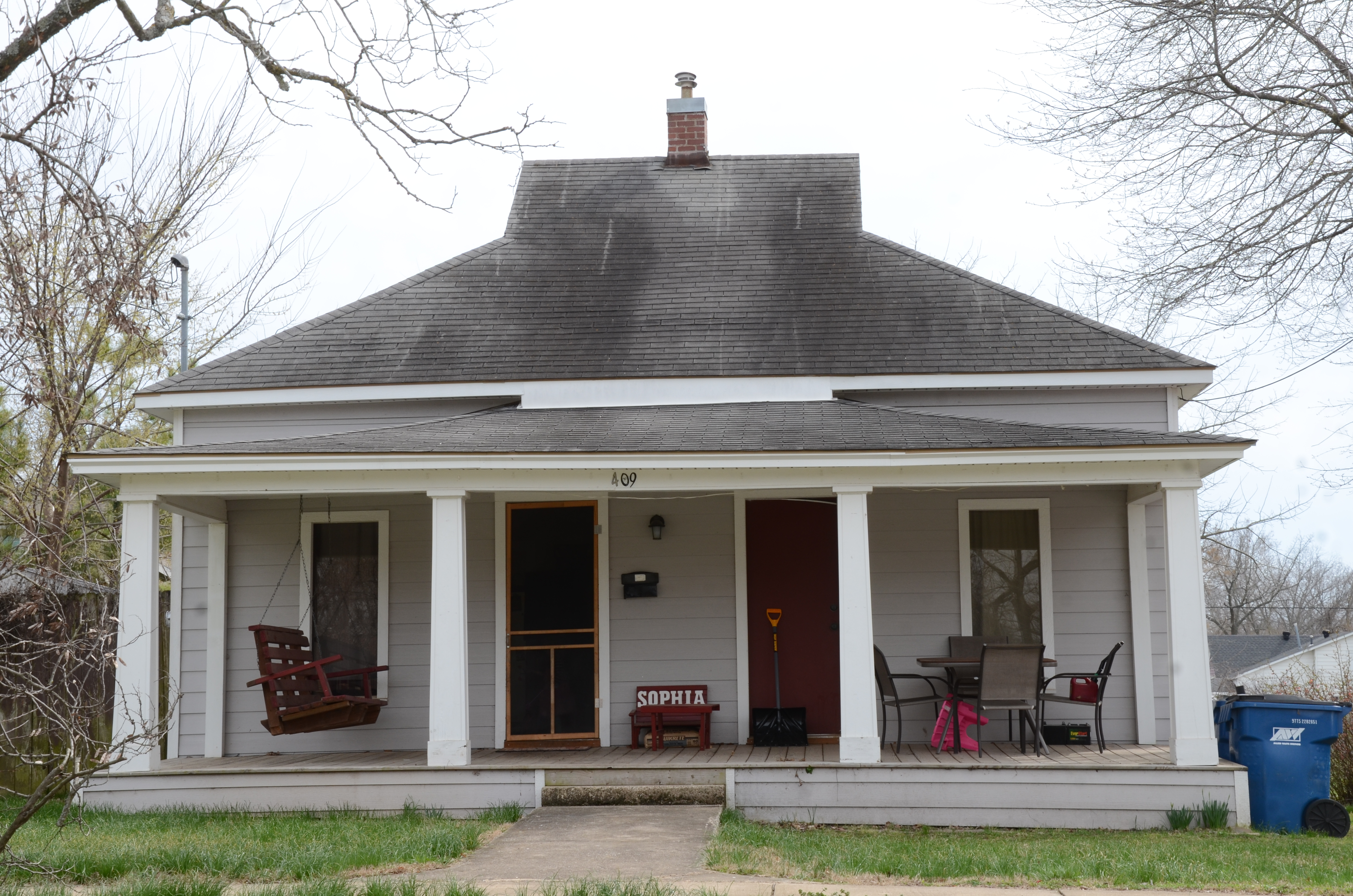

- Location within Arkansas Location within the United States
- Location: 409 Fifth St., Bentonville, Arkansas
- Coordinates: 36°22′39″N 94°12′52″W
- Area: less than one acre
- Built: 1908
- Architectural style: Gumdrop Duple
- MPS: Benton County MRA
- NRHP reference No.: 87002330

Significant dates
- Added to NRHP: January 22, 1988
- Removed from NRHP: October 7, 2026

The Koons House is a historic house at 409 Fifth Street NW in Bentonville, Arkansas. It is an unusually high-quality and well-preserved example of a once-common local vernacular form called the "gumdrop duple", a two-family residence with a pyramidal roof. The front facade has a single-story hip-roofed porch supported by tapered square columns, and there is a shed-roof addition across the rear. The roof is not fully pyramidal, having small gable sections near the peak that provide ventilation. The house was built c. 1908, and is a slightly larger version of the traditional form.

The house was listed on the National Register of Historic Places in 1988.

== See also ==
- National Register of Historic Places listings in Benton County, Arkansas
