= Oak Hill Mausoleum =

Historic site in Benton County, Arkansas

- U.S. National Register of Historic Places
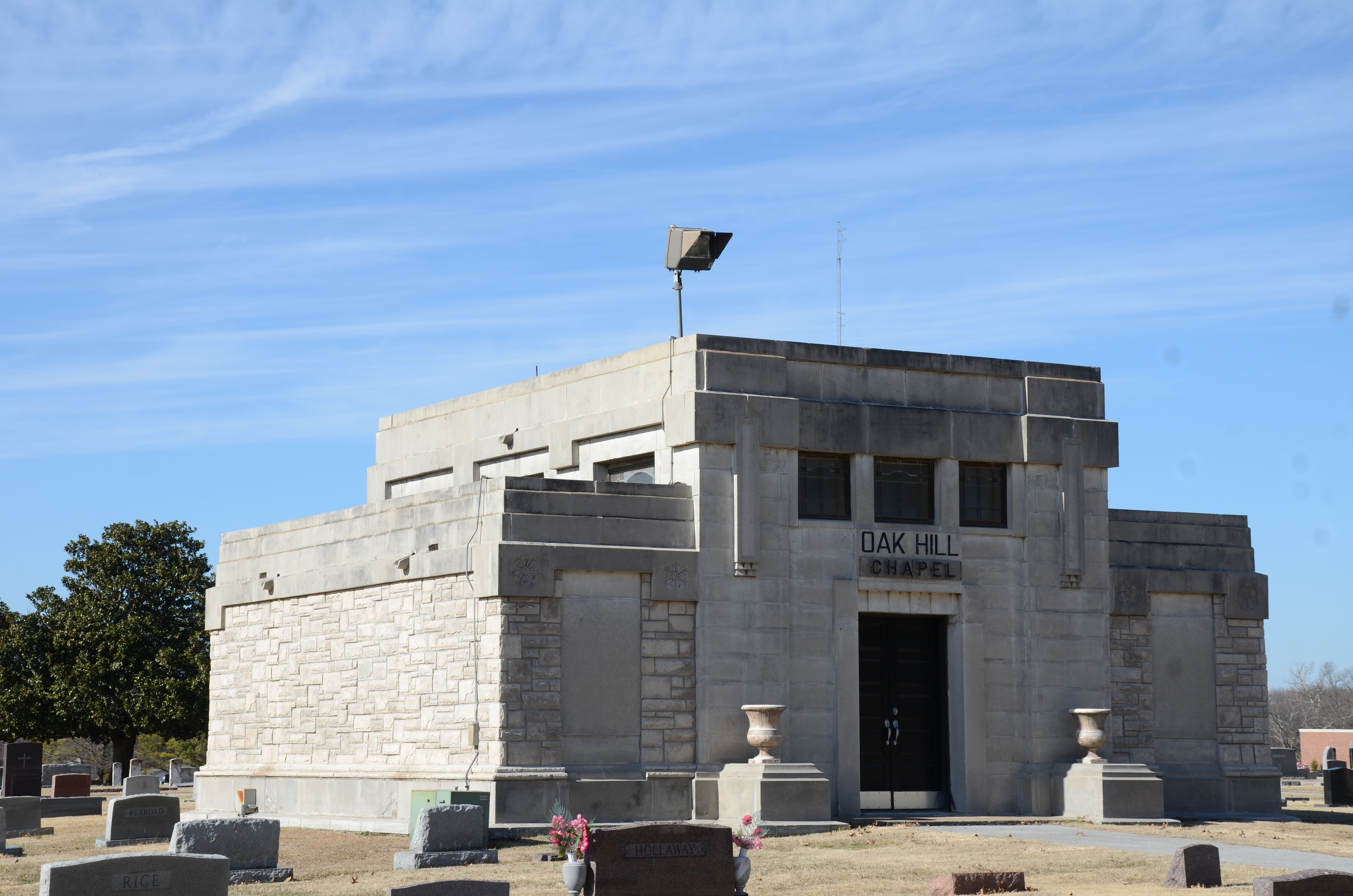

- Location within Arkansas Location within the United States
- Location: Oak Hill Cemetery, W of jct. of Benton St. and AR 43, Siloam Springs, Arkansas
- Coordinates: 36°11′16″N 94°33′38″W
- Area: less than one acre
- Built: 1916
- Architect: W.C. Barnhardt
- Architectural style: Classical Revival
- MPS: Benton County MRA
- NRHP reference No.: 96001412
- Added to NRHP: December 6, 1996

The Oak Hill Mausoleum, now Oak Hill Chapel, is a historic religious and funerary building in Oak Hill Cemetery, the oldest cemetery in Siloam Springs, Arkansas.

The massive granite Classical Revival structure was built in 1916 with funding raised by a local citizen group, and originally had a capacity of 72 burials. The mausoleum was designed by Cecil E. Bryan with an interior following a standard plan he used on other small mausoleums. The exterior is what sets this mausoleum apart from others he designed. He was inspired by the works of his former employer, Louis Sullivan.

The building deteriorated in condition, and its burials were relocated elsewhere within the cemetery. It was rescued from demolition and restored for use as a chapel. The building is regionally distinctive, because northwestern Arkansas is not known for having mausoleums at all, and the heavy stonework and Classical Revival styling are also fairly rare in the area.

The building was listed on the National Register of Historic Places in 1996.

== See also ==
- National Register of Historic Places listings in Benton County, Arkansas
