= Alden House (Bentonville, Arkansas) =

Historic house in Arkansas, United States

- U.S. National Register of Historic Places
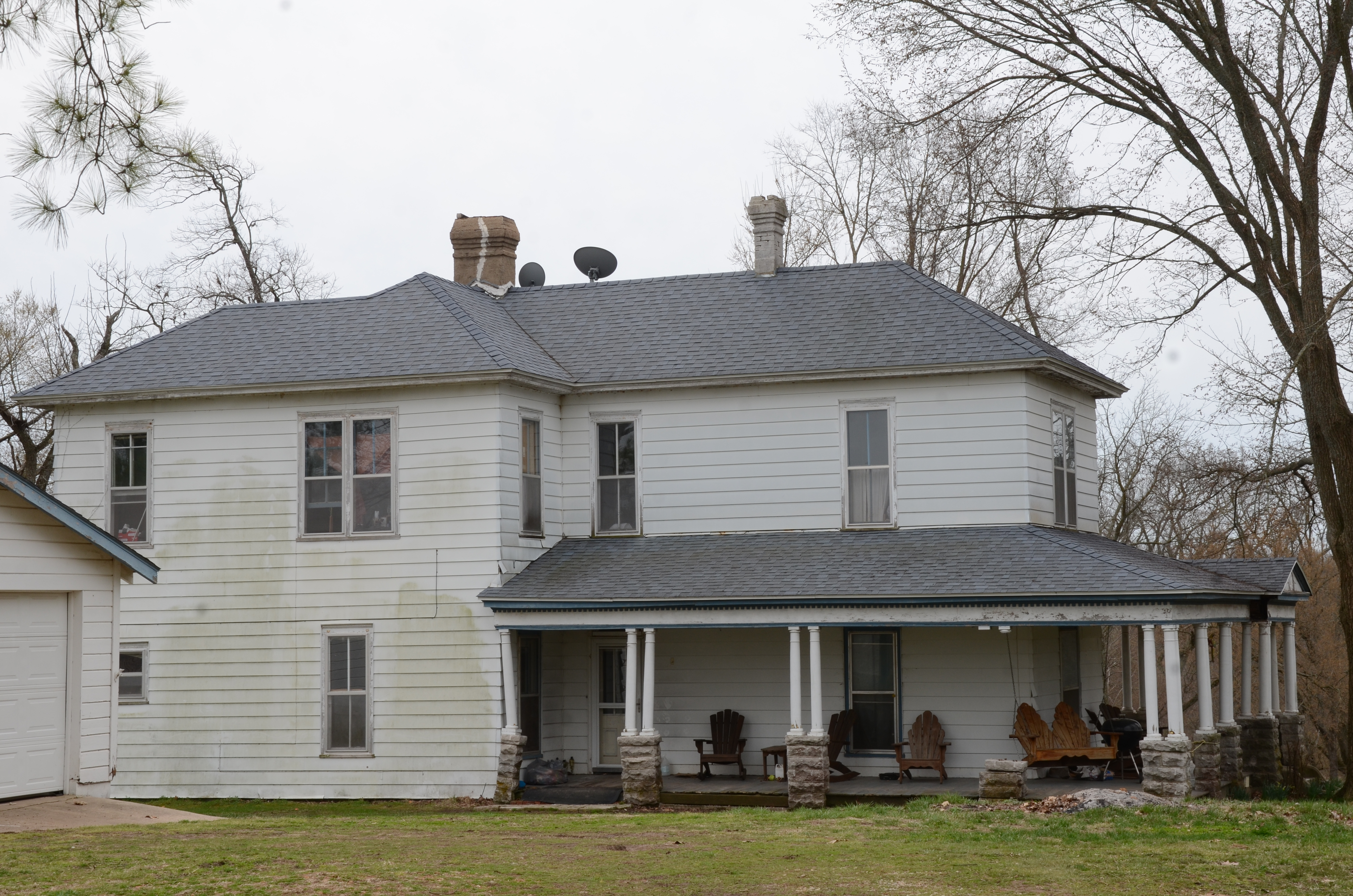

- Location within Arkansas Location within the United States
- Location: North of Osage Mills off Mill Dam Road, Bentonville, Arkansas
- Coordinates: 36°17′24″N 94°16′23″W
- Area: less than one acre
- Built: 1900
- Architectural style: Colonial Revival, Stick/eastlake
- MPS: Benton County MRA
- NRHP reference No.: 87002378
- Added to NRHP: January 28, 1988

The Alden House is a historic house in a rural part of southern Bentonville, Arkansas. It stands in an agricultural area which lies on 0.75 miles (1.21 km) north and 0.4 miles (0.64 km) west of the community of Osage Mills. It is a 1 1/2-story wood-frame structure, most notable for a single-story porch, which wraps around three sides of the house. The main entrance is located in the beveled northwest corner of the building. The house, built in c. 1900 by the son of Philo Alden, a leading local farmer of the time, has a distinctive combination of Colonial Revival and Eastlake Victorian features.

The house was listed on the National Register of Historic Places in 1988.

== See also ==
- National Register of Historic Places listings in Benton County, Arkansas
