= Braithwaite House =

Historic house in Arkansas, United States

- U.S. National Register of Historic Places
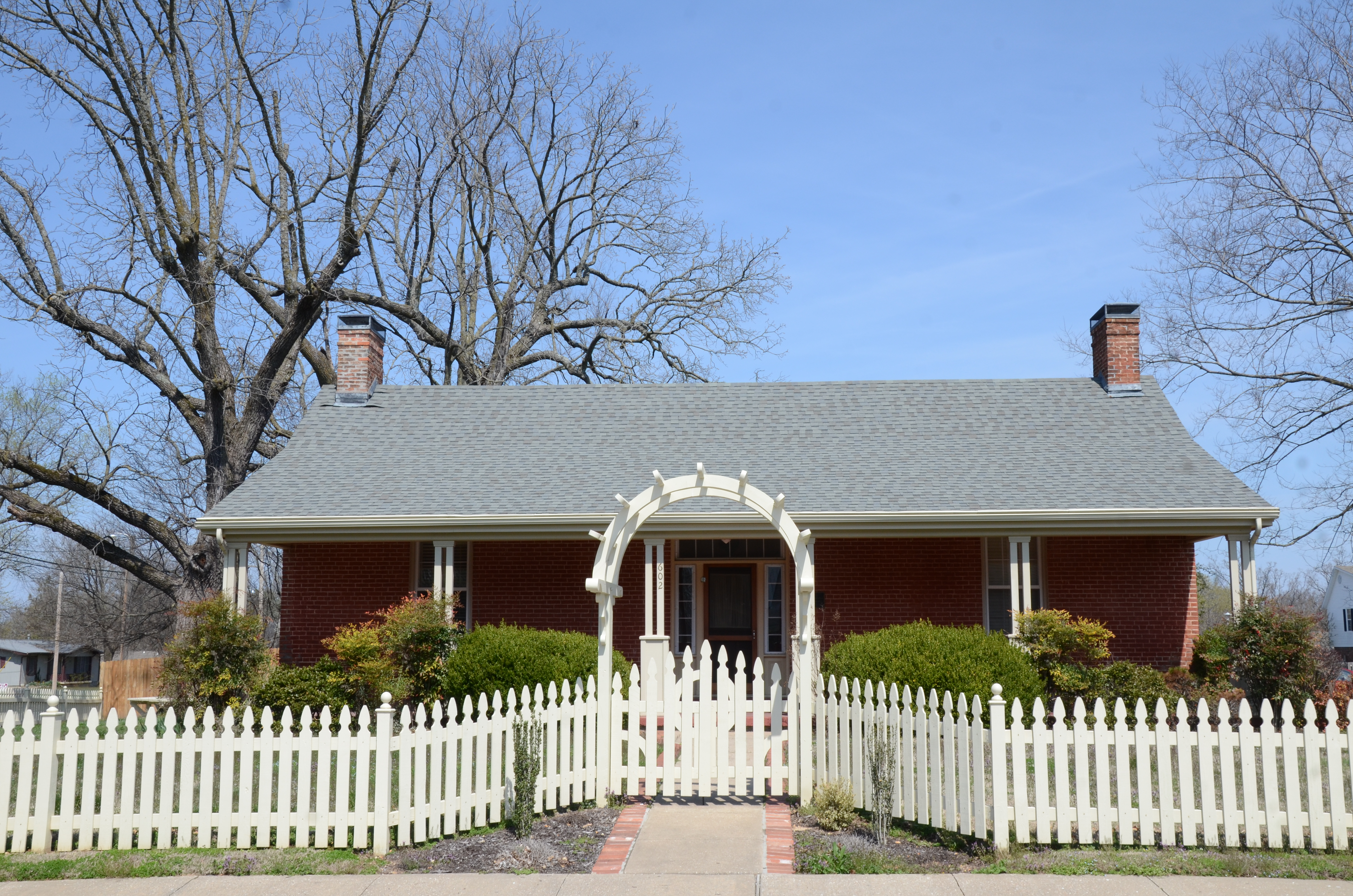

- Location within Arkansas Location within the United States
- Location: Old Bella Vista Hwy., Bentonville, Arkansas
- Coordinates: 36°23′23″N 94°13′2″W
- Area: less than one acre
- Built: 1885
- Built by: James Haney (mason)
- MPS: Benton County MRA
- NRHP reference No.: 87002314
- Added to NRHP: January 28, 1988

The Braithwaite House is a historic house at Bella Vista Drive and Braithwaite Street in Bentonville, Arkansas. Built c. 1855, this single-story brick house may be the oldest house in Benton County, and is the only one of its type in the city. Its form is similar to a saltbox with a side gable roof that has a short front slope and an extended rear slope. An open porch with a shed roof extends across the front. The house was by James Haney, an Irish brick mason, for the Braithwaites, who were major local landowners.

The house was listed on the National Register of Historic Places in 1988.

== See also ==
- National Register of Historic Places listings in Benton County, Arkansas
