= McCleod House =

Historic house in Arkansas, United States

- U.S. National Register of Historic Places
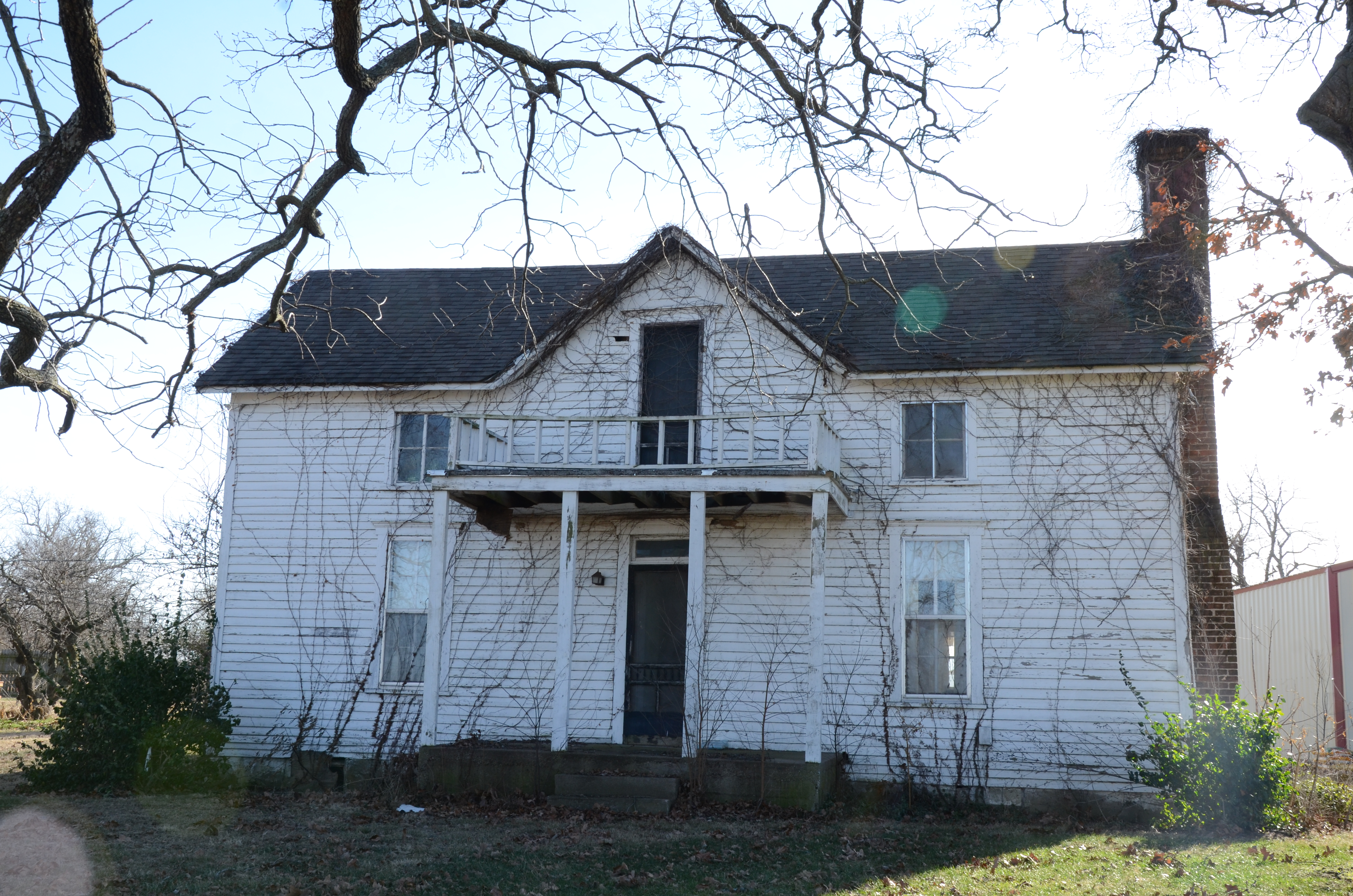

- Location within Arkansas Location within the United States
- Location: 6406 S. Mills Lane. Rogers, Arkansas
- Coordinates: 36°16′5″N 94°9′50″W
- Area: less than one acre
- Built: 1866
- Architectural style: I-House
- MPS: Benton County MRA
- NRHP reference No.: 87002355
- Added to NRHP: January 28, 1988

The McCleod House is a historic house on South Mills Lane in Rogers, Arkansas. It is a 1 1/2 story wood frame I-house, with a projecting single-story porch on the front, and a leanto section on the back, giving the house a saltbox shape. A gable at the center of the front facade contains a door giving access to the upper level of the porch. The house, built c. 1866, is a well-preserved example of a once-common housing form.

The house was listed on the National Register of Historic Places in 1988.

== See also ==
- National Register of Historic Places listings in Benton County, Arkansas
