= Rogers Milk Plant Building =

- U.S. National Register of Historic Places
- Location within Arkansas Location within the United States
- Location: 218 W. Birch St., Rogers, Arkansas
- Coordinates: 36°19′26″N 94°7′7″W
- Area: less than one acre
- Built: 1928
- NRHP reference No.: 100003324
- Added to NRHP: January 24, 2019

The Rogers Milk Plant Building is a historic commercial building at 216 West Birch in Rogers, Arkansas. It is an industrial three-story building, built out of concrete and steel. The floors are stepped, decreasing in size at each level. The exterior is painted concrete, with regularly spaced sash windows separated by pilaster-like projections. A metal-sided warehouse was appended to the building at a later date. The main structure was built in 1928, and was operated first by Barnes Dairy Products and then by the Carnation Company. In the 1960s it was taken over by a seed company business, which operated on the site until 2006.

The building was listed on the National Register of Historic Places in 2019.

== See also ==
- National Register of Historic Places listings in Benton County, Arkansas
