= Carpenter Building (Gentry, Arkansas) =

- U.S. National Register of Historic Places
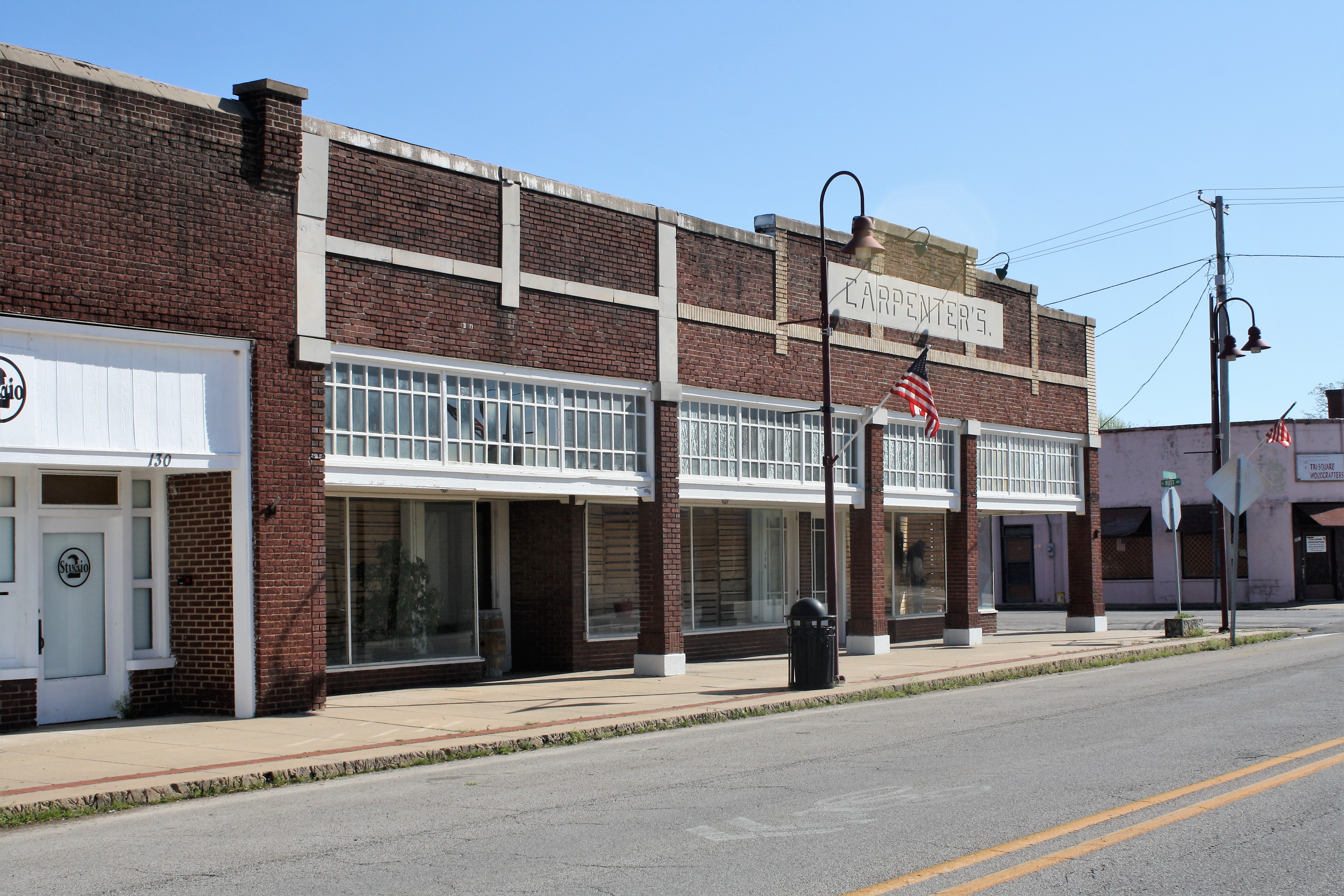

- Location within Arkansas Location within the United States
- Location: 136 E Main St., Gentry, Arkansas
- Coordinates: 36°16′3″N 94°29′0″W
- Area: less than one acre
- Built: 1904
- Architect: A.O. Clark
- NRHP reference No.: 100002447
- Added to NRHP: May 18, 2018

The Carpenter Building is a historic commercial building at 136 East Main Street in Gentry, Arkansas. Built in 1927–29, it is a single-story masonry structure, its exterior finished mainly in red brick and hollow clay tile. A stepped parapet obscures the flat roof, and the front facade is inset with square pier supports, giving the impression of a portico. The interior includes surviving original sections of tin ceilings. The building originally housed a retail grocery, as well as a mortuary and funeral chapel, but has since been repurposed to other uses.

The building was listed on the National Register of Historic Places in 2018.

== See also ==
- National Register of Historic Places listings in Benton County, Arkansas
