= Deaton Cabin =

Historic house in Arkansas, United States

- Formerly listed on the U.S. National Register of Historic Places
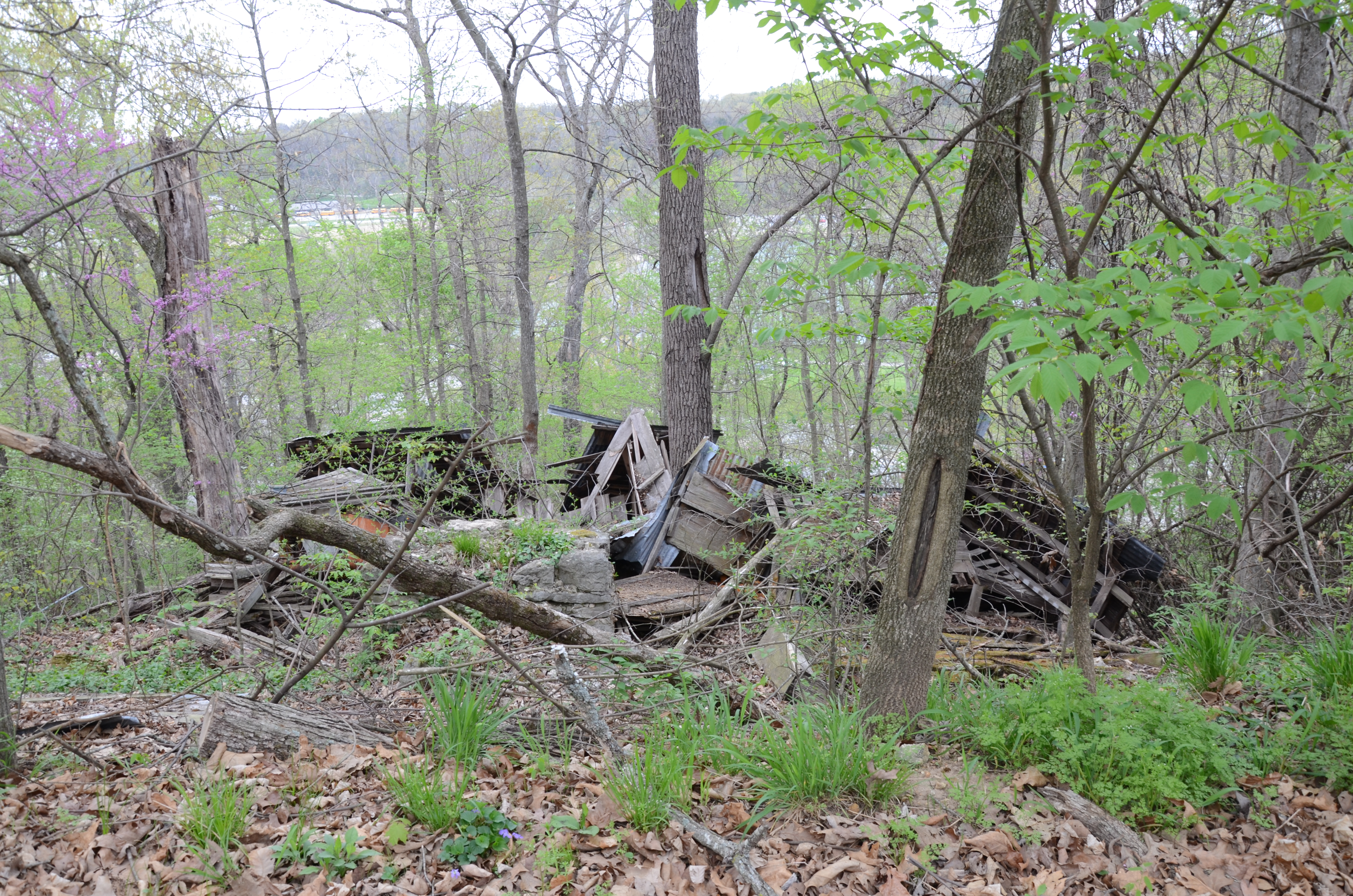
- The remains of the cabin

- Location within Arkansas Location within the United States
- Location: Suits Us Rd., Bella Vista, Arkansas
- Coordinates: 36°25′49″N 94°13′59″W
- Area: less than one acre
- Built: 1924
- MPS: Benton County MRA
- NRHP reference No.: 87002348

Significant dates
- Added to NRHP: January 28, 1988
- Removed from NRHP: October 7, 2026

The Deaton Cabin was a historic summer cabin on Suits Us Road in Bella Vista, Arkansas.

== Background ==
It was a single-story structure, fashioned out of rustically cut wood framing. It was a long rectangle in shape, oriented north–south and parallel to Suits Us Road. Its gable roof extended over a former carport that had been screened and converted into a porch area. Its entrance was sheltered by a gabled portico, and there was a rough fieldstone chimney just to its left. It was little-altered since its c. 1924 construction, and was one of a handful of surviving summer cabins from that period in Bella Vista.

The cabin was listed on the National Register of Historic Places in 1988.

== See also ==
- National Register of Historic Places listings in Benton County, Arkansas
