= Pyeatte House =

Historic house in Arkansas, United States

- U.S. National Register of Historic Places
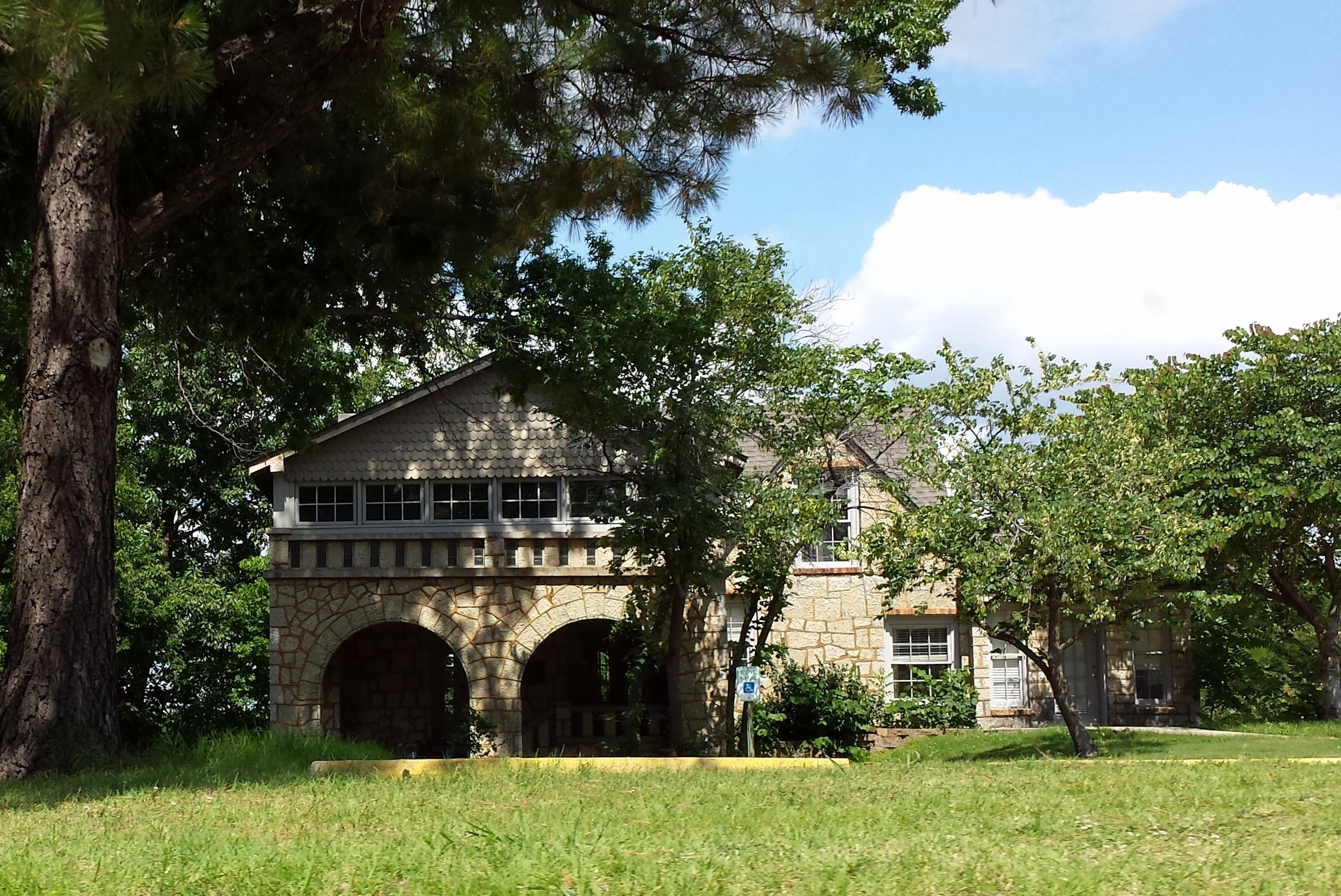

- Location within Arkansas Location within the United States
- Location: 311 S. Mt. Olive St., Siloam Springs, Arkansas
- Coordinates: 36°10′53″N 94°32′29″W
- Area: less than one acre
- Built: 1932
- Architect: Moss, G.E.
- Architectural style: Tudor Revival
- MPS: Benton County MRA
- NRHP reference No.: 95001382
- Added to NRHP: November 29, 1995

The Pyeatte House is a historic house at 311 South Mt. Olive Street in Siloam Springs, Arkansas. It is a two-story structure, built of masonry and wood framing, with an asymmetrical organization. Its left side is dominated by a projecting gable section with a round-arch porte-cochere beneath a bank of windows, and with scalloped wooden shingles filling the gable end. Built 1932–34, it is the community's finest example of Tudor Revival architecture executed in fieldstone.

The house was listed on the National Register of Historic Places in 1995.

== See also ==
- National Register of Historic Places listings in Benton County, Arkansas
