= Henry-Thompson House =

Historic house in Arkansas, United States

- Henry House
- U.S. National Register of Historic Places
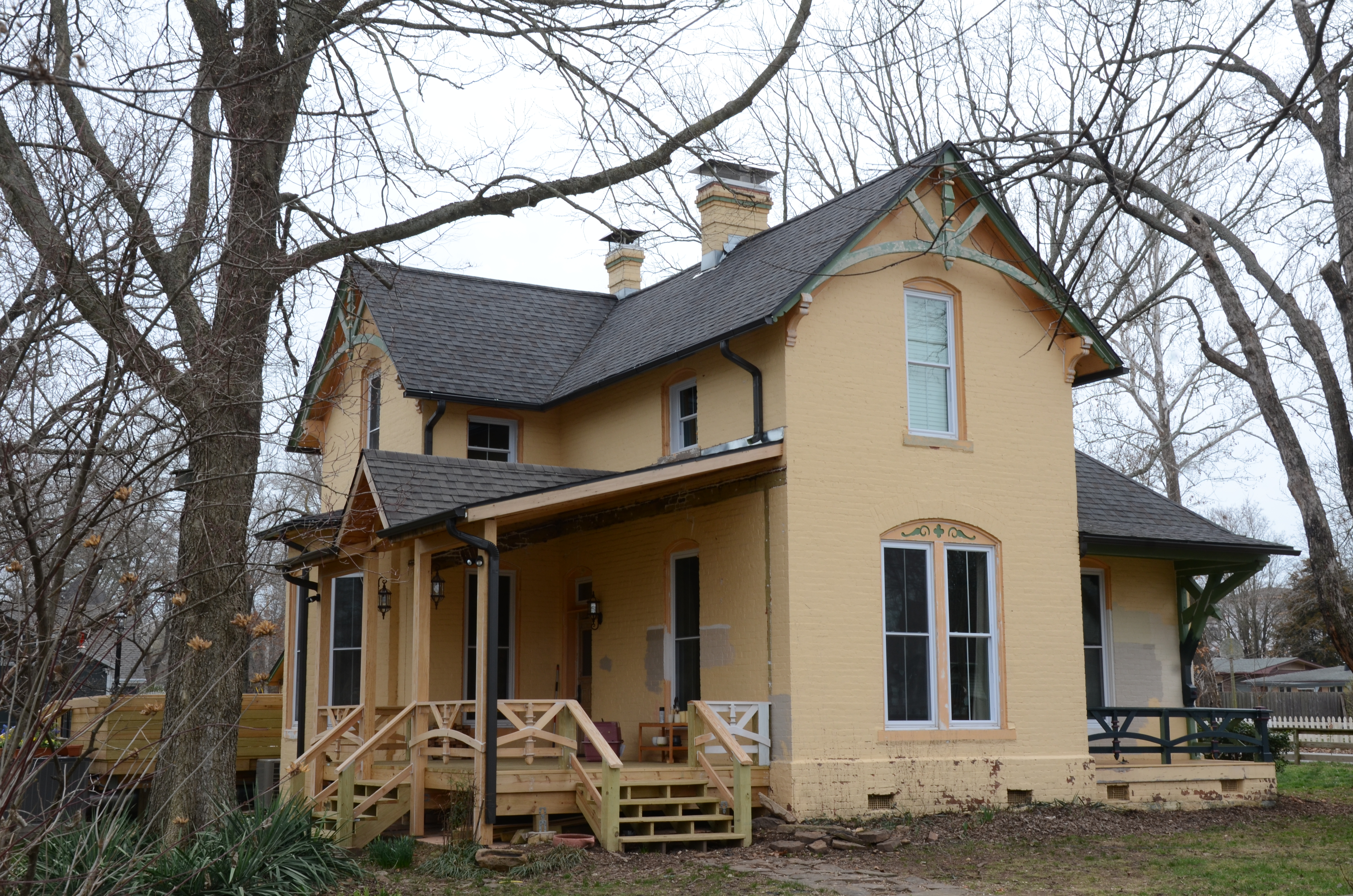

- Location within Arkansas Location within the United States
- Location: 302 S.E. Second St., Bentonville, Arkansas
- Coordinates: 36°22′16″N 94°12′21″W
- Area: less than one acre
- Built: 1890
- Architectural style: Italianate
- MPS: Benton County MRA
- NRHP reference No.: 87002327
- Added to NRHP: January 28, 1988

The Henry-Thompson House is a historic house at 302 SE Second Street in Bentonville, Arkansas. It is a two-story brick building, with Italianate styling that includes trusswork in the front-facing gable, a scrollwork balustrade on the main porch, and scrolled brackets on a hood over a secondary entrance. Built in 1890, this is a good representative of late Italianate style brick homes that were built in significant numbers in Bentonville between 1870 and 1895.

The house was listed on the National Register of Historic Places in 1988.

== See also ==
- National Register of Historic Places listings in Benton County, Arkansas
