= Shores Warehouse =

- U.S. National Register of Historic Places
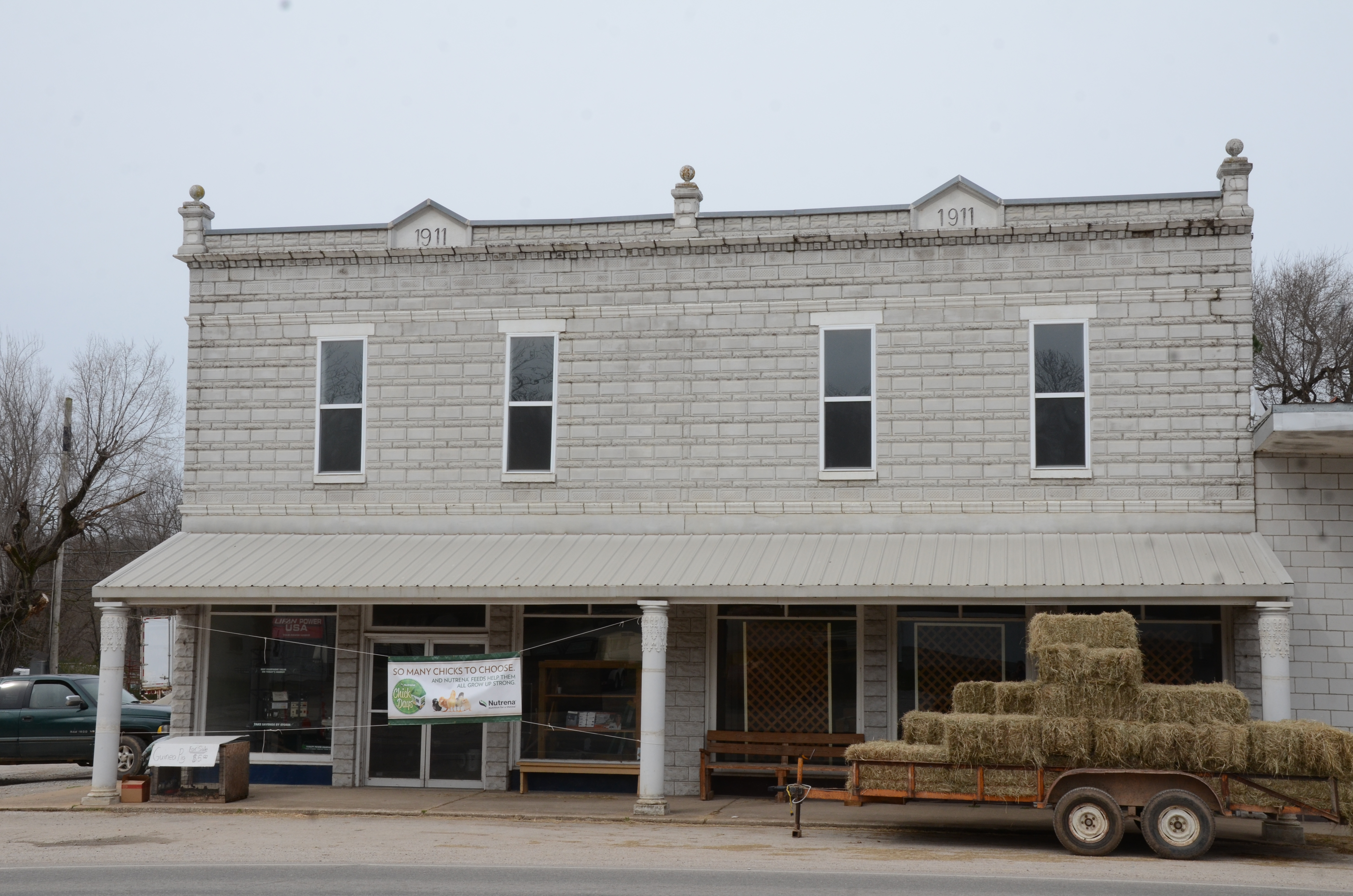

- Location within Arkansas Location within the United States
- Location: Main St., Cave Springs, Arkansas
- Coordinates: 36°15′44″N 94°13′55″W
- Area: less than one acre
- Built: 1911
- MPS: Benton County MRA
- NRHP reference No.: 87002374
- Added to NRHP: January 28, 1988

The Shores Warehouse is a historic commercial building on Main Street in Cave Springs, Arkansas. It is a two-story masonry building, built in 1911 out of concrete blocks, which have on two sides of the building been faced to resemble rusticated stone. Originally built as a commercial retail building, it has a single-story metal awning sheltering the ground floor, which is divided into six bays by concrete block stanchions. The outer two bays were originally plate glass like the others, but have been filled in. The front is topped by a pressed metal dentillated cornice. The building is little-altered commercial building of the period, and exemplifies the popular use of concrete blocks for construction in the region during the early 20th century.

The building was listed on the National Register of Historic Places in 1988.

== See also ==
- National Register of Historic Places listings in Benton County, Arkansas
