= Quell House =

Historic house in Arkansas, United States

- U.S. National Register of Historic Places
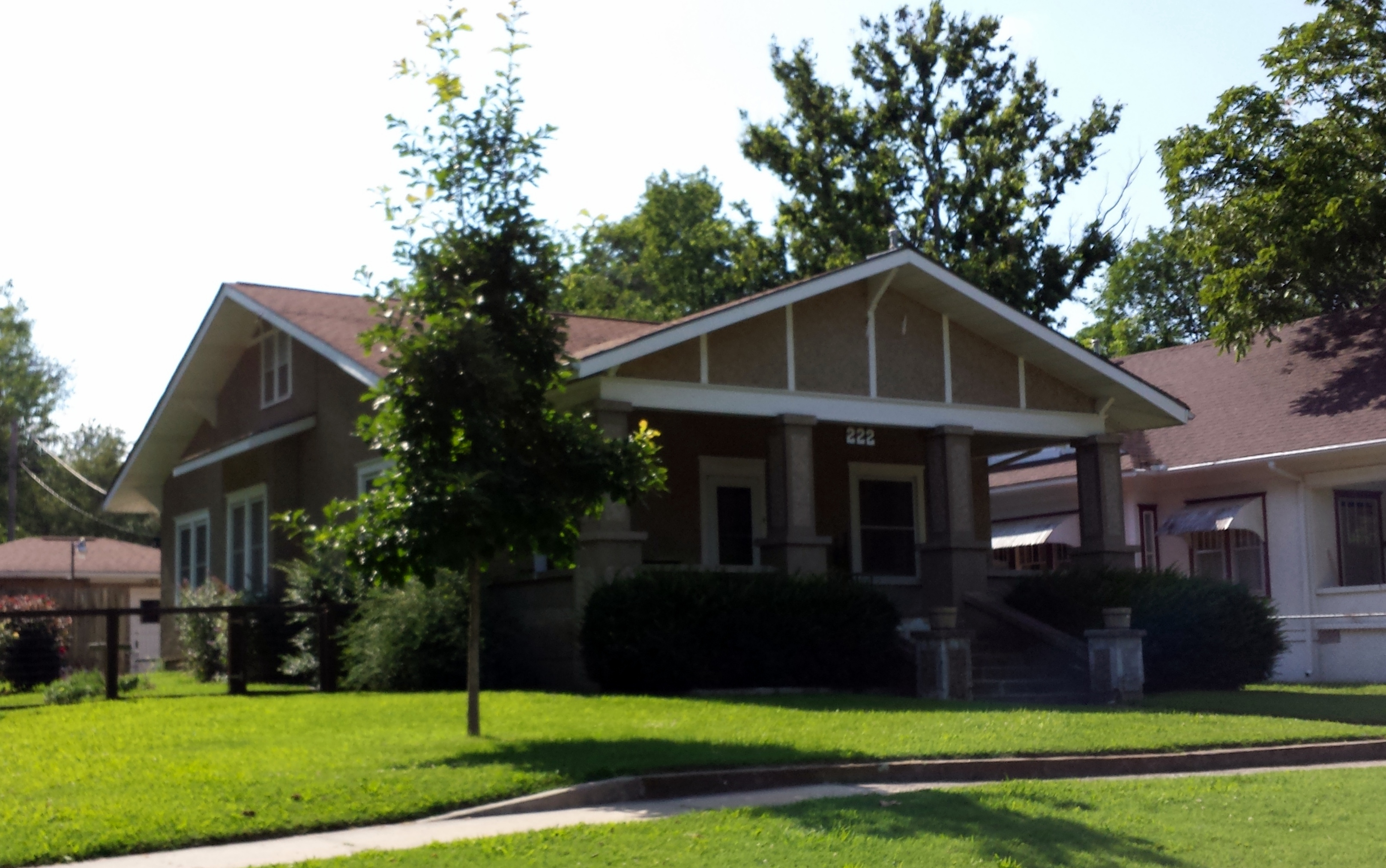

- Location within Arkansas Location within the United States
- Location: 222 S. Wright, Siloam Springs, Arkansas
- Coordinates: 36°11′1″N 94°32′32″W
- Area: less than one acre
- Built: 1920
- Architectural style: Bungalow/craftsman
- MPS: Benton County MRA
- NRHP reference No.: 87002387
- Added to NRHP: January 28, 1988

The Quell House is a historic house at 222 South Wright Street in Siloam Springs, Arkansas. It is a 1 1/2-story Craftsman bungalow with a shallow-pitch side gable roof, and a front gabled porch extending across the front which is supported by stuccoed piers. The gables have deep eaves and exposed rafter ends. The walls are finished in stucco that had a gravel-like material thrown against it while wet, giving it a rough and textured surface. Built c. 1920, it is a fine local example of the Craftsman/bungalow style.

The house was listed on the National Register of Historic Places in 1988.

== See also ==
- National Register of Historic Places listings in Benton County, Arkansas
