= Blackburn House (Rogers, Arkansas) =

Historic house in Arkansas, United States

- U.S. National Register of Historic Places
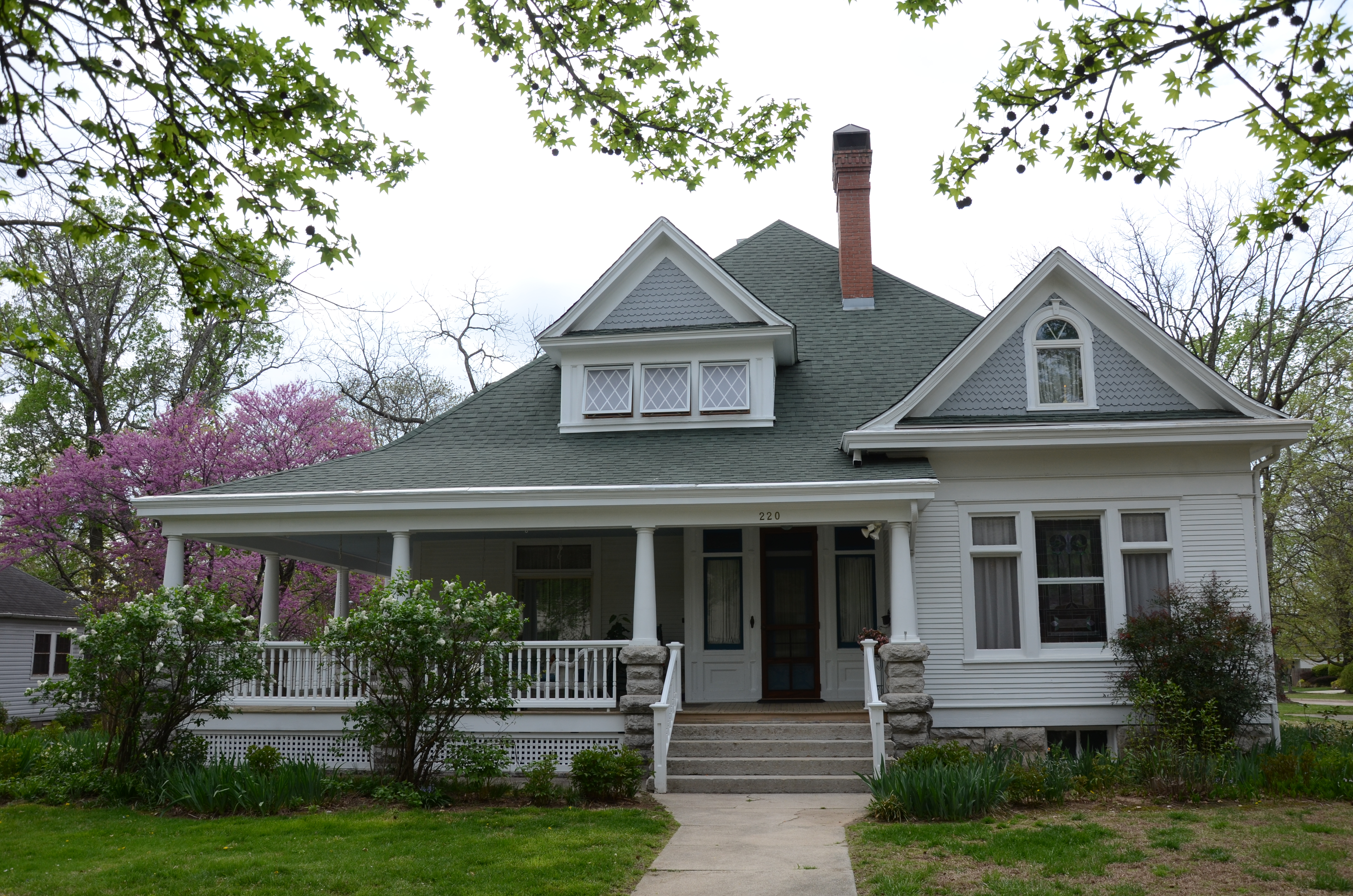

- Location within Arkansas Location within the United States
- Location: 220 N. Fourth St., Rogers, Arkansas
- Coordinates: 36°20′6″N 94°7′11″W
- Area: less than one acre
- Built: 1907
- Architectural style: Classical Revival
- MPS: Benton County MRA
- NRHP reference No.: 87002402
- Added to NRHP: January 28, 1988

The Blackburn House is a historic house at 220 North Fourth Street in Rogers, Arkansas. It is a 1 1/2-story wood-frame structure, set on a stone foundation, with a busy roofline typical of Late Victorian styling, but with more stylistically Classical Revival features, such as turned columns supporting its wraparound porch. The house was built in 1907 by J. A. C. Blackburn, a lumber baron who controlled much of the timber industry in northwestern Arkansas. Blackburn built the house as a showcase for his wood products.

The house was listed on the National Register of Historic Places in 1988.

== See also ==
- National Register of Historic Places listings in Benton County, Arkansas
