= Maxwell-Hinman House =

Historic house in Arkansas, United States

- U.S. National Register of Historic Places
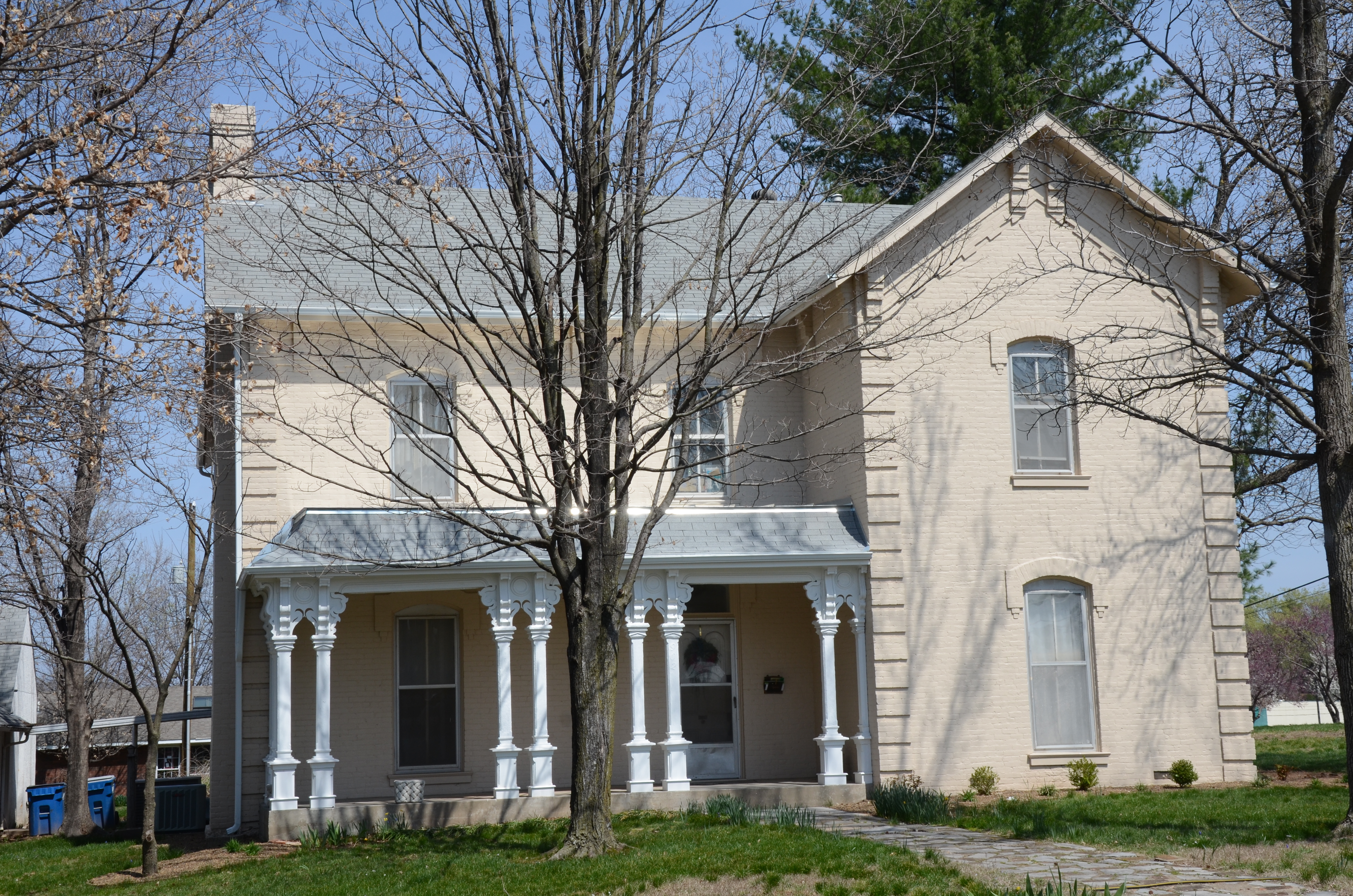

- Location within Arkansas Location within the United States
- Location: 902 N.W. Second St., Bentonville, Arkansas
- Coordinates: 36°22′23″N 94°13′18″W
- Area: less than one acre
- Built: 1881
- Architectural style: Italianate
- MPS: Benton County MRA
- NRHP reference No.: 87002322
- Added to NRHP: January 28, 1988

The Maxwell-Hinman House is a historic house at 902 NW Second Street in Bentonville, Arkansas. It is an elaborate L-shaped Italianate brick house, supposedly built in 1881 by a returning Civil War veteran. It has decorative brickwork brackets, cornice, corner quoining, and window hoods. The only significant woodwork on the exterior are the porch columns which have ornate scrollwork capitals. The high quality work and unusual decorative elements suggest the house was built by workmen from outside the area.

The house was listed on the National Register of Historic Places in 1988.

== See also ==
- National Register of Historic Places listings in Benton County, Arkansas
