= Drane House =

Historic house in Arkansas, United States

- Formerly listed on the U.S. National Register of Historic Places
- Location within Arkansas Location within the United States
- Location: 1004 S. First St., Rogers, Arkansas
- Coordinates: 36°19′24″N 94°7′2″W
- Area: less than one acre
- Built: 1890
- Architectural style: I-House
- MPS: Benton County MRA
- NRHP reference No.: 87002389

Significant dates
- Added to NRHP: January 28, 1988
- Removed from NRHP: January 26, 2018

The Drane House was a historic house at 1004 South First Street in Rogers, Arkansas. It was a 1 1/2-story brick I-house, three bays wide, with a side gable roof. A single-story porch extended across its front facade, supported by wooden box columns and topped by an open balustraded porch. The upper porch was accessed by a centered doorway which has a small gable above. Built c. 1890, it was a rare brick building from the first decade of Rogers' settlement.

The house was listed on the National Register of Historic Places in 1988. It was later demolished, and was delisted in 2018.

== See also ==
- National Register of Historic Places in Benton County, Arkansas
