= Charles Juhre House =

Historic house in Arkansas, United States

- U.S. National Register of Historic Places
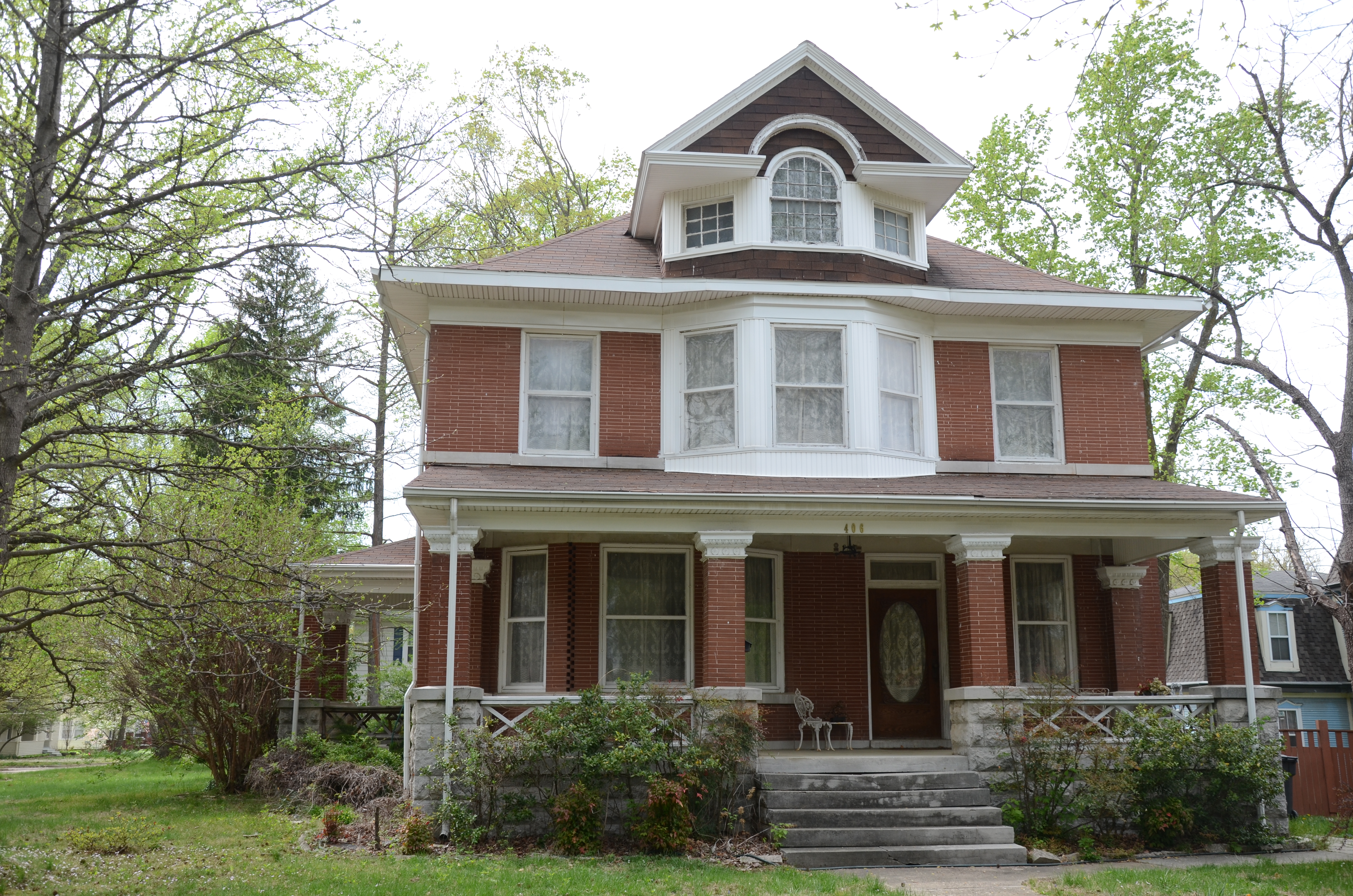

- Location within Arkansas Location within the United States
- Location: 406 N. 4th St., Rogers, Arkansas
- Coordinates: 36°20′12″N 94°7′10″W
- Area: less than one acre
- Built: 1908
- Architect: A.O. Cllark
- Architectural style: Classical Revival, Colonial Revival, American Foursquare
- MPS: Benton County MRA
- NRHP reference No.: 93000091
- Added to NRHP: February 25, 1993

The Charles Juhre House is a historic house at 406 North 4th Street in Rogers, Arkansas. It is a brick American Foursquare house, two stories in height, with a front porch extending across the full width of the building. A polygonal window projection occupies the center bay on the second floor, and there is a large gable dormer with a Palladian window projecting above it from the hip roof. The house was designed by local architect A. O. Clark, and is a fine local example of transitional Colonial and Classical Revival style.

The house was listed on the National Register of Historic Places in 1993.

== See also ==
- National Register of Historic Places listings in Benton County, Arkansas
