= Morris House (Bentonville, Arkansas) =

Historic house in Arkansas, United States

- Formerly listed on the U.S. National Register of Historic Places
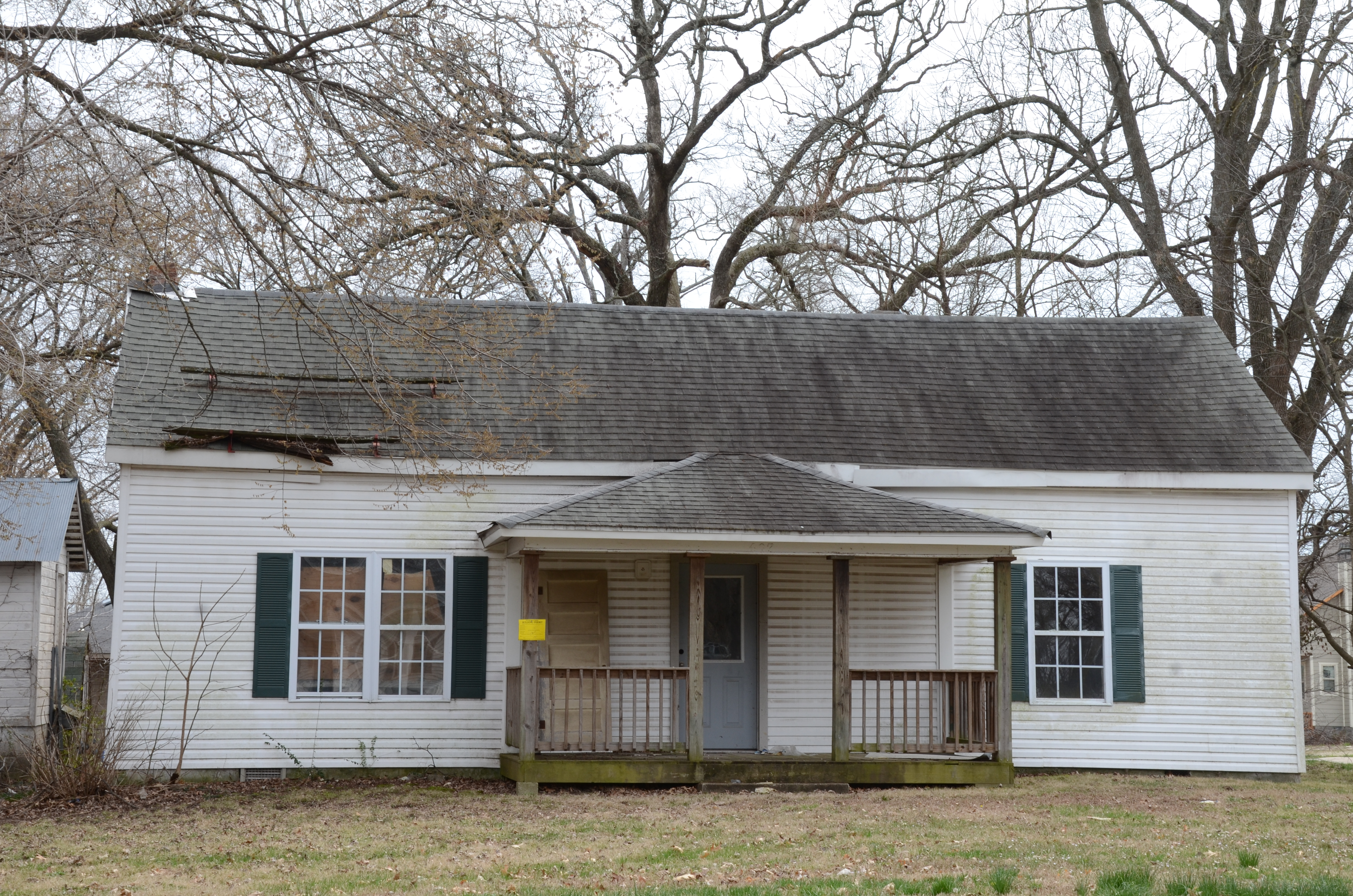

- Location within Arkansas Location within the United States
- Location: 410 SW 4th St., Bentonville, Arkansas
- Coordinates: 36°22′4″N 94°12′48″W
- Area: less than one acre
- Built: 1855
- MPS: Benton County MRA
- NRHP reference No.: 87002316

Significant dates
- Added to NRHP: January 28, 1988
- Removed from NRHP: October 14, 2026

The Morris House is a historic house at 410 SW 4th Street in Bentonville, Arkansas. Built c. 1855, this single-story frame structure is one of the few surviving pre-Civil War structures in Benton County. It has a side gable roof, narrow clapboard siding, a wide frieze board, and capped corner boards giving a hint of Greek Revival styling. Its original owner and exact construction date are not known.

The house was listed on the National Register of Historic Places in 1988.

The house was demolished in 2023.

== See also ==
- National Register of Historic Places listings in Benton County, Arkansas
