= Bertschy House =

Historic house in Arkansas, United States

- Formerly listed on the U.S. National Register of Historic Places
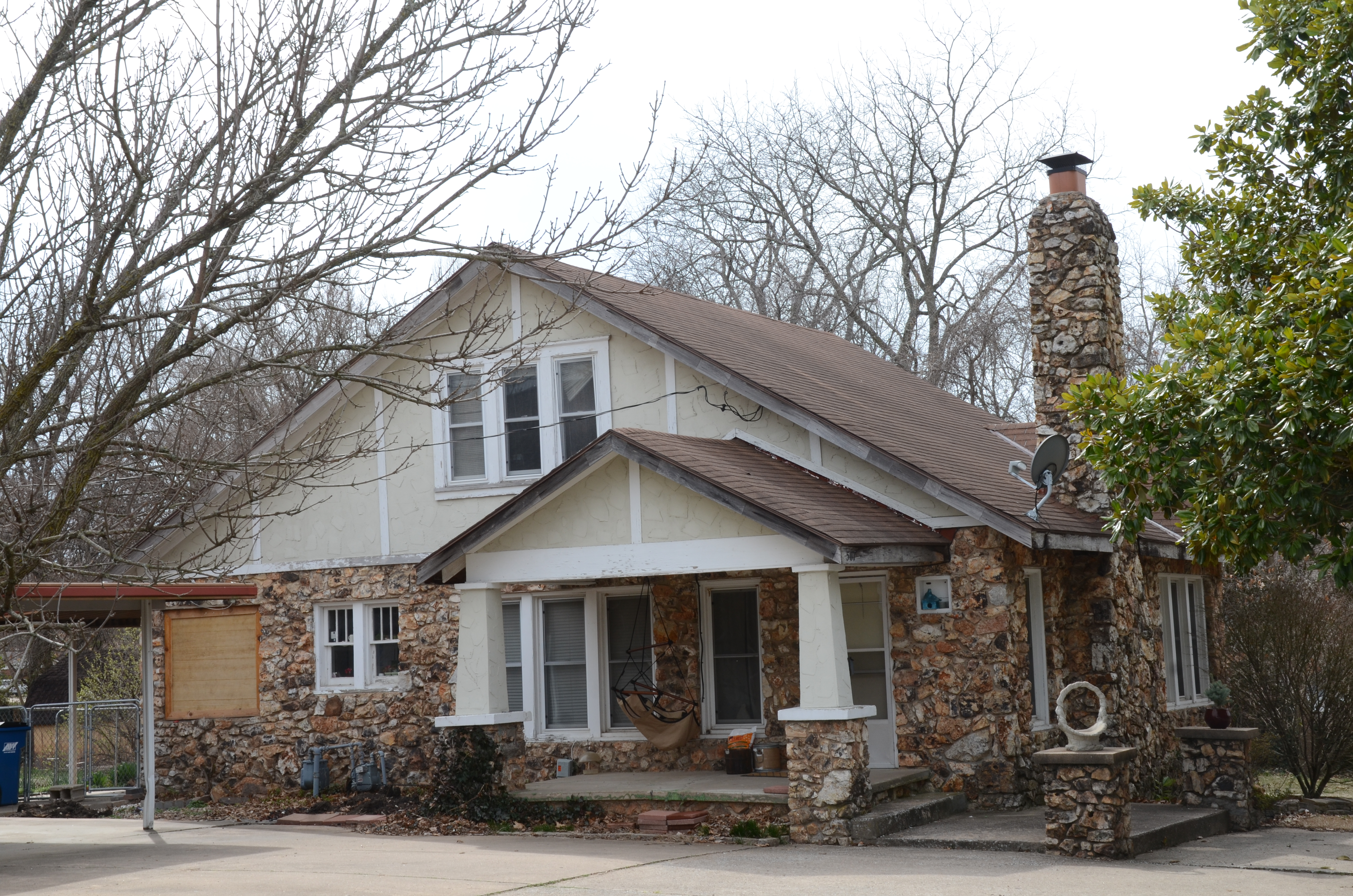

- Location within Arkansas Location within the United States
- Location: 507 NW. Fifth Street, Bentonville, Arkansas, US
- Coordinates: 36°22′39″N 94°12′56″W
- Area: less than one acre
- Built: 1925
- Architectural style: Bungalow/Craftsman
- MPS: Benton County MRA
- NRHP reference No.: 87002336

Significant dates
- Added to NRHP: January 28, 1988
- Removed from NRHP: October 7, 2026

The Bertschy House is a historic house located at 507 NW Fifth Street in Bentonville, Arkansas, US.

== Description and history ==
It was a 1 1/2-story, stone and masonry house notable for its wide overhanging roof with exposed rafter tails, and a gabled portico supported by tapered square columns mounted on stone piers. Built in about 1925, it is significant as a well-preserved local example of the bungalow style, executed in local fieldstone.

The house was listed on the National Register of Historic Places on January 28, 1988.

== See also ==
- National Register of Historic Places listings in Benton County, Arkansas
