= Myler House =

- U.S. National Register of Historic Places
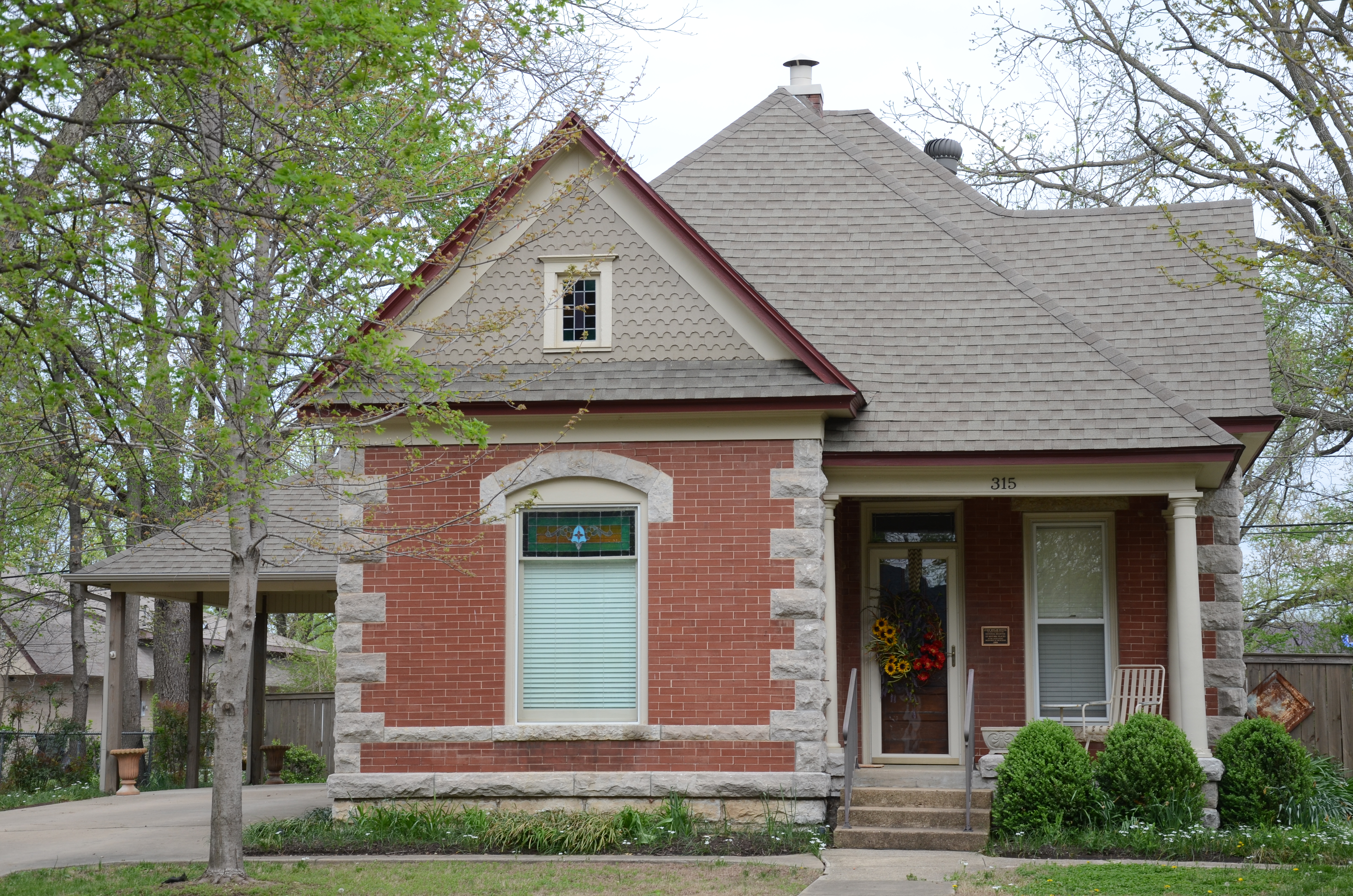

- Location within Arkansas Location within the United States
- Location: 315 N. Third St., Rogers, Arkansas
- Coordinates: 36°20′8″N 94°7′5″W
- Area: less than one acre
- Built: 1895
- Architect: Crowe, C.R.; Myler, John B.
- MPS: Benton County MRA
- NRHP reference No.: 87002393
- Added to NRHP: January 28, 1988

The Myler House is a historic house at 315 North Third Street in Rogers, Arkansas, USA. It is a single story L-shaped structure, built of brick with limestone trim. Prominent trim elements include corner quoining, stone segmental arches above the windows, and a stone beltcourse that coincides with the window sills. The house was built c. 1895 by C. R. Crowe, a prominent local stonemason, for his family. Crowe and his son-in-law, John Myler, are believed to be responsible for much the stone trim work of buildings erected in the area in the early 20th century, and this house is likely attributable to Crowe.

The house was listed on the National Register of Historic Places in 1988.

== See also ==
- National Register of Historic Places listings in Benton County, Arkansas
