= Parks-Reagan House =

Historic house in Arkansas, United States

- U.S. National Register of Historic Places
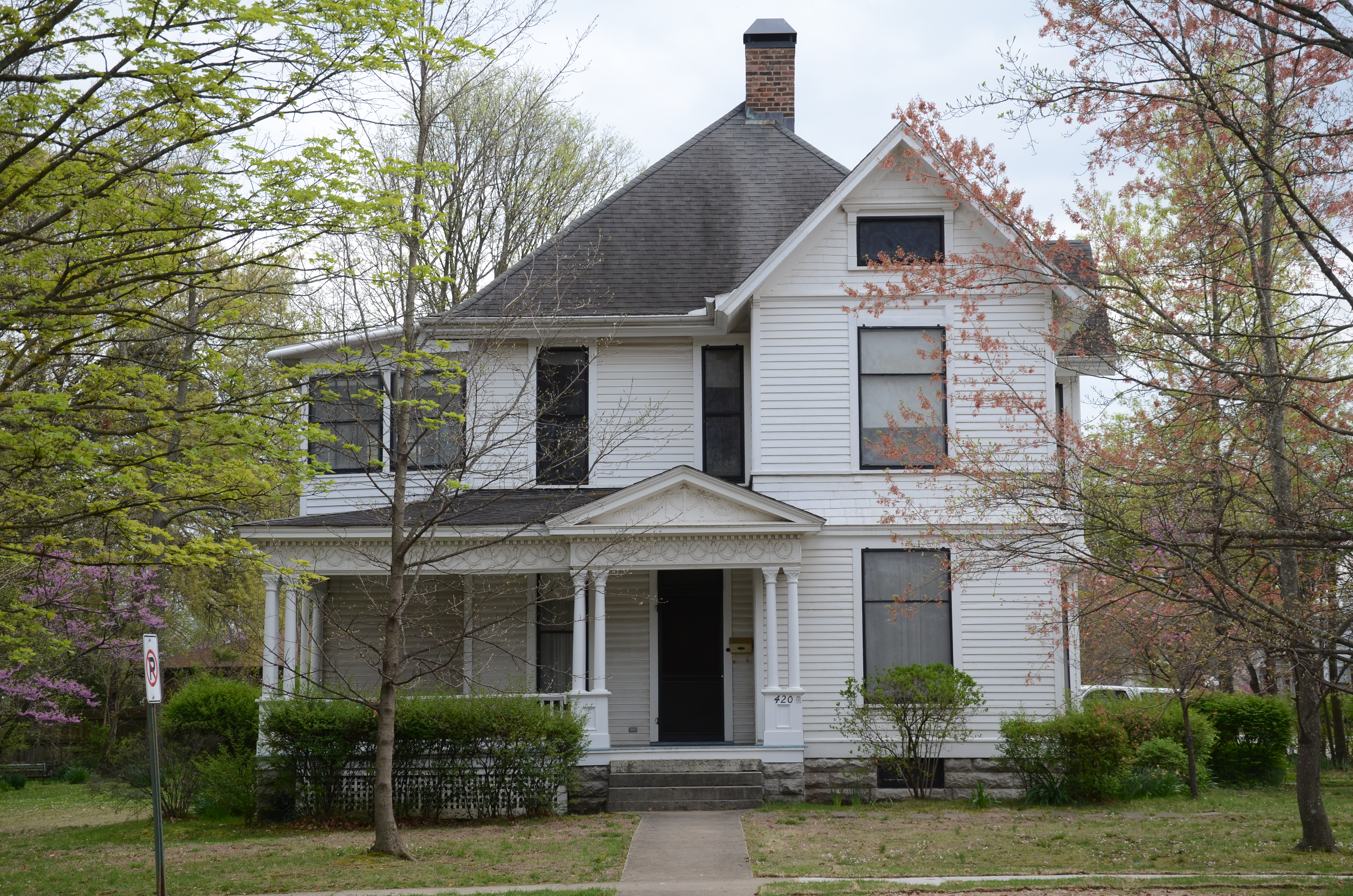

- Location within Arkansas Location within the United States
- Location: 420 W. Poplar St., Rogers, Arkansas
- Coordinates: 36°19′52″N 94°7′15″W
- Area: less than one acre
- Built: 1898
- Architect: John Myler
- Architectural style: Colonial Revival
- MPS: Benton County MRA
- NRHP reference No.: 87002395
- Added to NRHP: January 28, 1988

The Parks-Reagan House is a historic house at 420 West Poplar Street in Rogers, Arkansas. Built in 1898, this two-story Colonial Revival house is one of the finest and oldest in Rogers. It is a wood-frame structure, roughly square in shape, with a pyramidal roof and a forward-projecting gable-roof section. A single-story porch wraps around the front and side of the house, with a gable-pedimented section marking the entry stairs. The house was built for George Parks, a local merchant, and has since 1923 been owned by the Reagan family.

The house was listed on the National Register of Historic Places in 1988.

== See also ==
- National Register of Historic Places listings in Benton County, Arkansas
