= Blake House (Bentonville, Arkansas) =

Historic house in Arkansas, United States

- Formerly listed on the U.S. National Register of Historic Places
- Location within Arkansas Location within the United States
- Location: 211 S.E. A St., Bentonville, Arkansas
- Coordinates: 36°22′12″N 94°12′26″W
- Area: less than one acre
- Built: 1885
- MPS: Benton County MRA
- NRHP reference No.: 87002324

Significant dates
- Added to NRHP: January 28, 1988
- Removed from NRHP: January 26, 2018

The Blake House was a historic house at 211 Southeast A Street in Bentonville, Arkansas. It was a two-story wood frame duplex, with entirely vernacular styling, except for a Craftsman-style porch (with tapered square columns set on stone piers) added in the 20th century. The house, estimated to have been built in the 1880s, was a remarkably well-preserved example of a once-numerous building type in the city.

The house was listed on the National Register of Historic Places in 1988. It has been demolished, and was delisted in 2018.

== See also ==
- National Register of Historic Places listings in Benton County, Arkansas
