= Charles R. Craig Building =

Historic building in Bentonville, Arkansas, US

- U.S. National Register of Historic Places
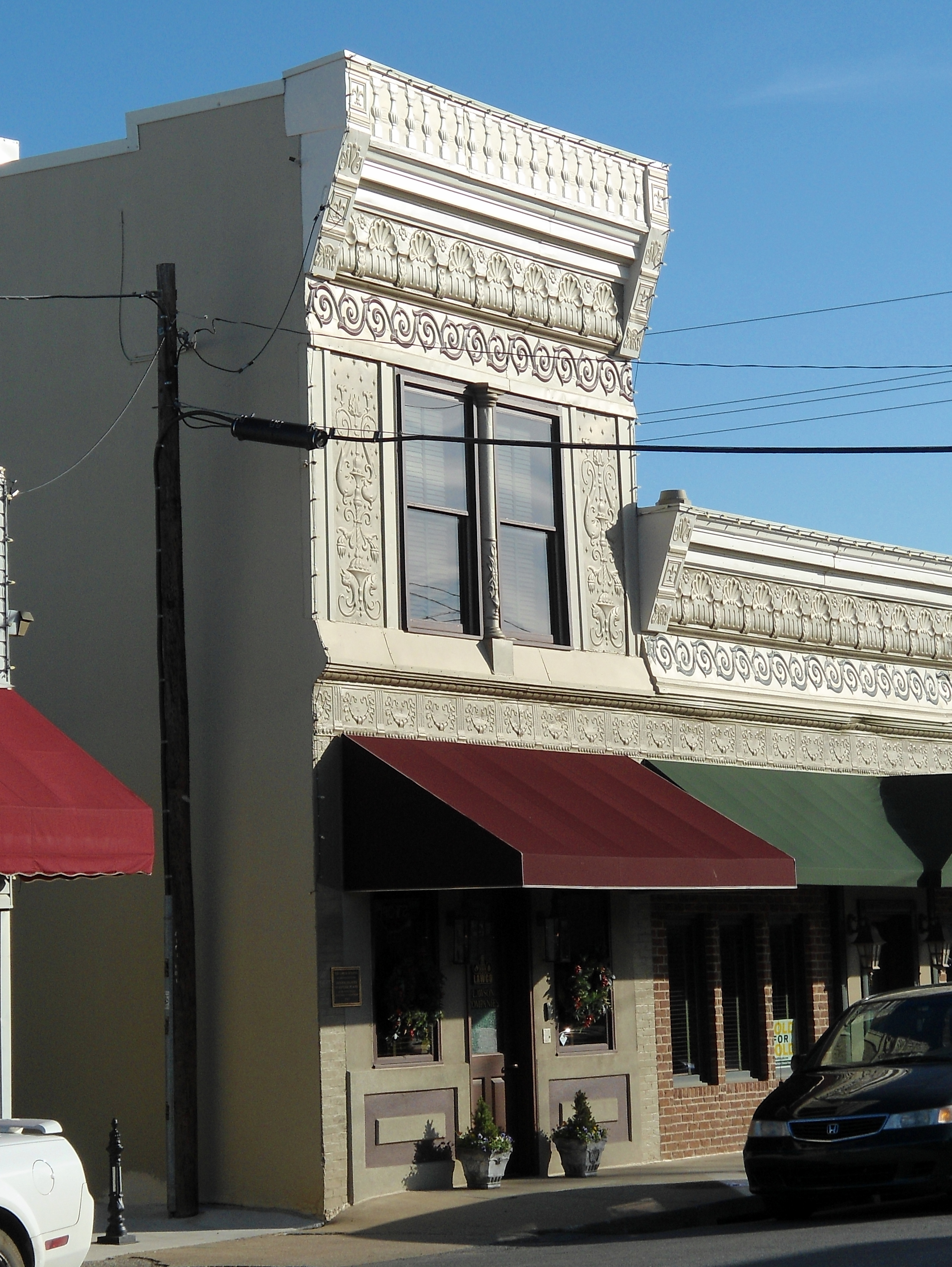

- Location within Arkansas Location within the United States
- Location: 113 S. Main St., Bentonville, Arkansas
- Coordinates: 36°22′16″N 94°12′30″W
- Area: less than one acre
- Built: 1910
- Architectural style: Early Commercial, Italianate
- NRHP reference No.: 03000957
- Added to NRHP: September 27, 2003

The Charles R. Craig Building is a historic commercial building at 113 South Main Street in downtown Bentonville, Arkansas. It is a brick two story building, clad in stucco and a distinctive pressed metal facade with Italianate styling. It was built c. 1900 by Charles Craig, a real estate broker and merchant. The building was later occupied by J. W. Blocker, who owned the Bentonville Apple Evaporator. It is believed that he installed the large walk-in safe on the premises. It continues to be used for housing professional offices.

The building was listed on the National Register of Historic Places in 2003.

== See also ==
- National Register of Historic Places listings in Benton County, Arkansas
