= German Builder's House =

Historic house in Arkansas, United States

- U.S. National Register of Historic Places
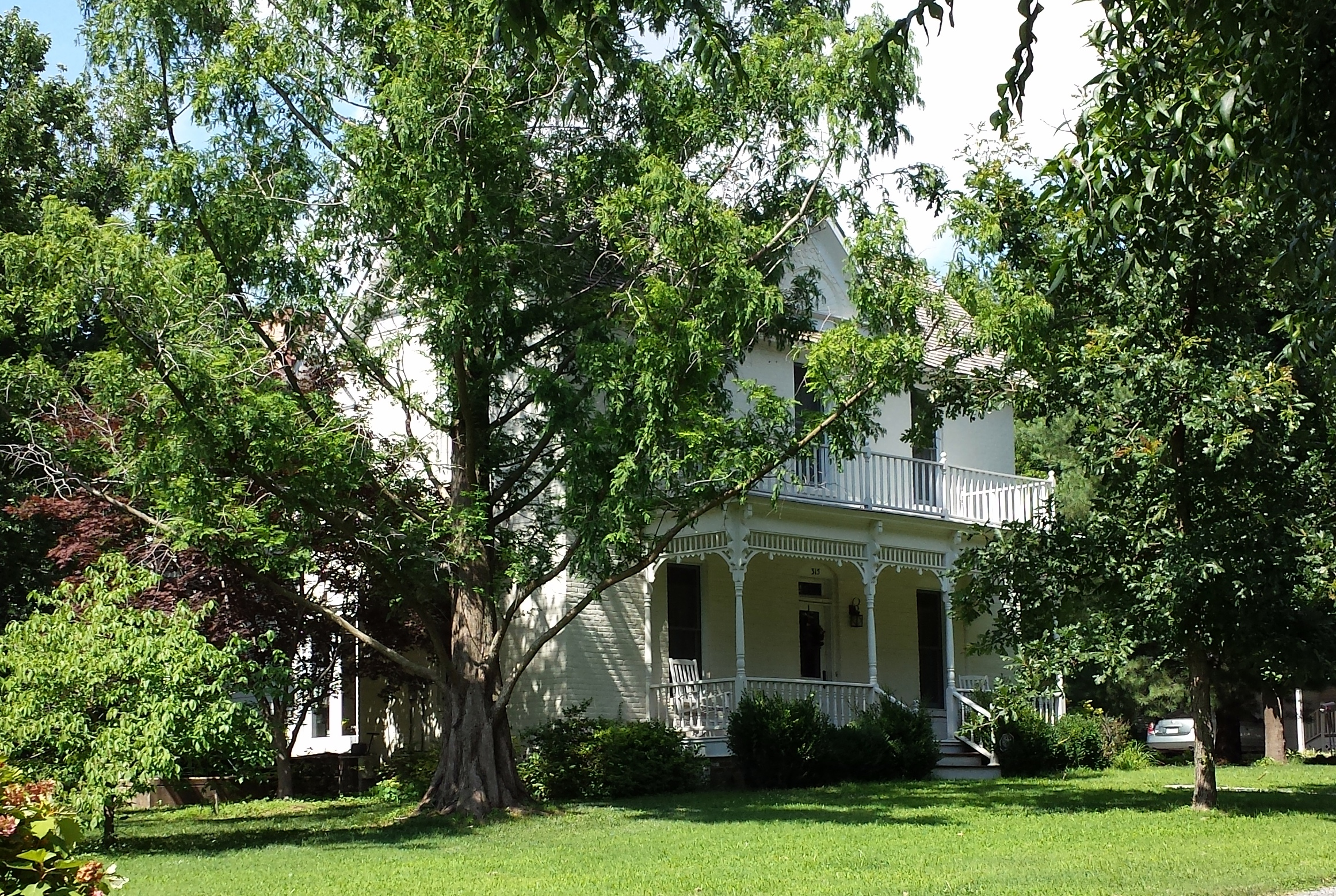

- Location within Arkansas Location within the United States
- Location: 315 E. Central, Siloam Springs, Arkansas
- Coordinates: 36°11′7″N 94°32′20″W
- Area: less than one acre
- Built: 1880
- Architectural style: I-House
- MPS: Benton County MRA
- NRHP reference No.: 87002426
- Added to NRHP: January 28, 1988

The German Builder's House is a historic house at 315 East Central Street in Siloam Springs, Arkansas. It is a two-story brick I-house, with a side gable roof and a rear wood-frame addition, giving it an overall T shape. A porch with open veranda above spans most of the width of the main facade, with Queen Anne style turned posts and balusters, and a spindled frieze. The house was built c. 1880 by German masons from St. Louis who were working on a nearby school building. It is one of the finest brick I-houses in Benton County.

The house was listed on the National Register of Historic Places in 1988.

== See also ==
- National Register of Historic Places listings in Benton County, Arkansas
