= Smith House (Bentonville, Arkansas) =

Historic house in Arkansas, United States

- Formerly listed on the U.S. National Register of Historic Places
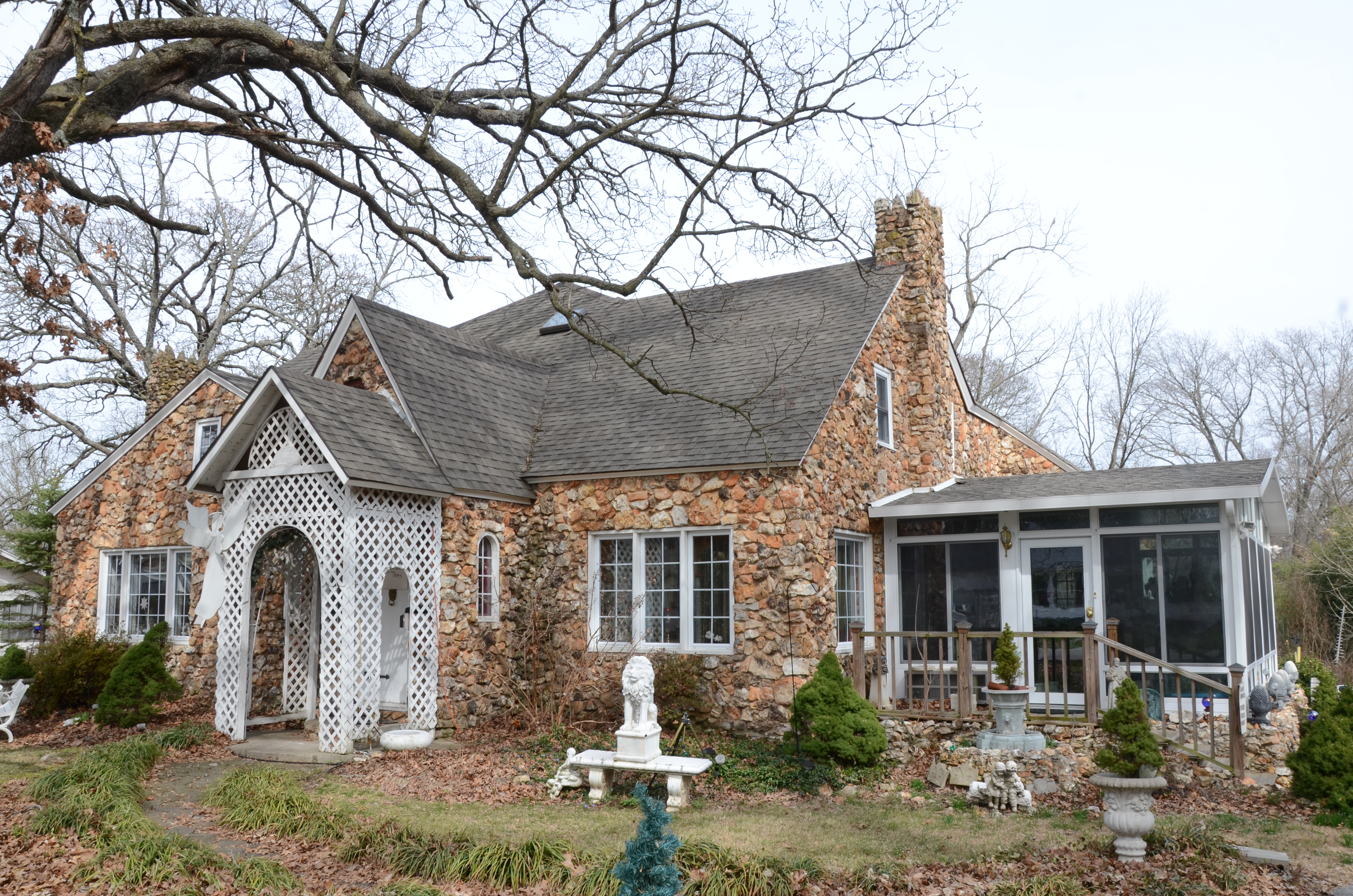

- Location within Arkansas Location within the United States
- Location: 806 N.W. A St, Bentonville, Arkansas
- Coordinates: 36°22′51″N 94°12′33″W
- Area: less than one acre
- Built: 1925
- Architect: Breathwaite, Willard
- Architectural style: Tudor Revival
- MPS: Benton County MRA
- NRHP reference No.: 96001273

Significant dates
- Added to NRHP: November 7, 1996
- Removed from NRHP: October 14, 2026

The Smith House is a historic house at 806 NW "A" Street in Bentonville, Arkansas. It is a 1 1/2-story L-shaped Tudor Revival house, with a rubblestone exterior. Its main (west-facing) facade has a side-gable roof, with two projecting gable sections. The left one is broader and has a shallow pitch roof, while that at the center is narrower and steeply pitched, sheltering the entrance. It is decorated with latticework that frames the entrance. Built c. 1925, it is the only known Tudor Revival style house of this sort in Benton County.

The house was listed on the National Register of Historic Places in 1996.

== See also ==
- National Register of Historic Places listings in Benton County, Arkansas
