= Putman Cemetery =

Historic cemetery in Arkansas, United States

- U.S. National Register of Historic Places
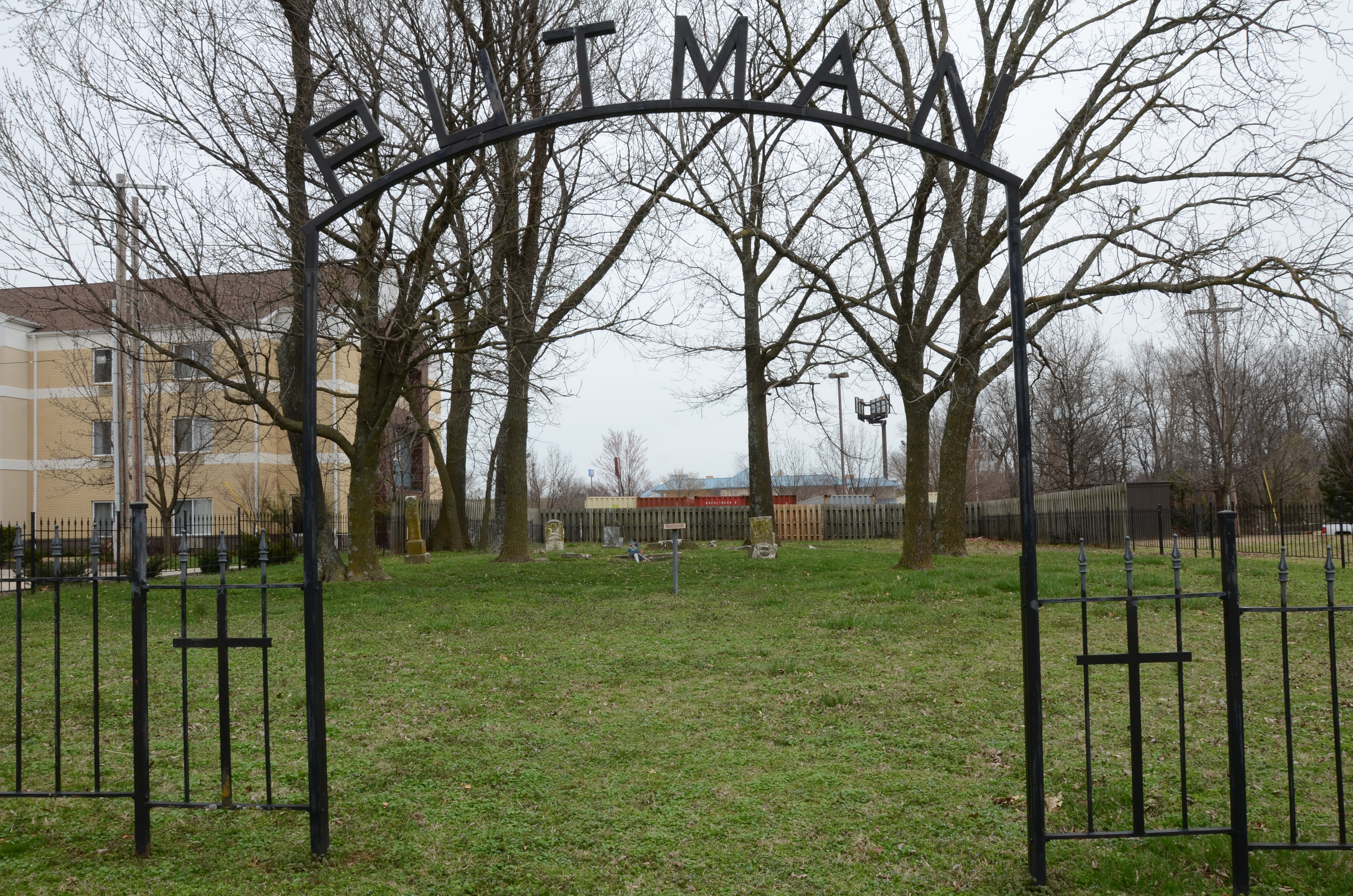

- Location within Arkansas Location within the United States
- Nearest city: Bentonville, Arkansas
- Coordinates: 36°20′11″N 94°11′17″W
- Area: 0.3 acres (0.12 ha)
- MPS: Benton County MRA
- NRHP reference No.: 04000510
- Added to NRHP: May 24, 2004

The Putman Cemetery is a historic cemetery on SE Metro Parkway, just south of Walton Boulevard, in Bentonville, Arkansas. Now completely surrounded by commercial development, this small cemetery (less than 0.5 acres (0.20 ha)) is ringed by an iron fence with an arch identifying it, and is located just behind hotels that front on Walton Boulevard. The cemetery was established in 1860, and was the family burial ground of the Putman family, who were some of Benton County's earliest settlers. It has fourteen marked graves, and an unknown number of unmarked ones.

The cemetery was listed on the National Register of Historic Places in 2004.

== See also ==
- National Register of Historic Places listings in Benton County, Arkansas
