= Siloam Springs station =

Destroyed historic train station in Arkansas

- Siloam Springs Train Station
- Formerly listed on the U.S. National Register of Historic Places
- Location: East Jefferson; Siloam Springs, Arkansas
- Coordinates: 36.1810°N 94.5332°W
- NRHP reference No.: 87002413

Significant dates
- Added to NRHP: January 28, 1988
- Removed from NRHP: March 31, 2000

Siloam Springs station was a railway station in Siloam Springs, Arkansas.

The Port Arthur and Gulf Railroad reached Siloam Springs in December 1893 after some delay. The original depot was moved slightly to the south in 1915 and new passenger facilities constructed in its place. Passenger service under the Kansas City Southern Railway ceased after 1968.

The Siloam Springs Museum moved into the building in 1971, though quickly outgrew the space and relocated the following year. The station was added to the National Register of Historic Places on January 28, 1988. It was destroyed in a fire in 1991 and subsequently removed from the register on March 31, 2000. Parts of the station were reused in the construction of and are displayed in the Arkansas State Welcome Center in Siloam Springs.

Preceding station	Kansas City Southern Railway	Following station
Gentry toward Kansas City	Main Line	Watts toward Port Arthur
