= Rife House (Rogers, Arkansas) =

Historic house in Arkansas, United States

- Formerly listed on the U.S. National Register of Historic Places
- Location within Arkansas Location within the United States
- Location: 1515 S. Eighth St., Rogers, Arkansas
- Coordinates: 36°19′9″N 94°13′33″W
- Area: less than one acre
- Built: 1920
- MPS: Benton County MRA
- NRHP reference No.: 87002406

Significant dates
- Added to NRHP: January 28, 1988
- Removed from NRHP: October 14, 2026

The Rife House was a historic house at 1515 South Eighth Street in Rogers, Arkansas. It was a modest single-story house, built out of concrete blocks cast to resemble rusticated stone. It had a gable-on-hip roof, with a shed-roof extension to the rear, and a full-width porch across the front. The porch was supported by four fluted columns fashioned out of concrete blocks. Built c. 1920, this was a local example of a vernacular house built using a once-popular construction material.

The house was listed on the National Register of Historic Places in 1988, but has since been destroyed.

== See also ==
- National Register of Historic Places listings in Benton County, Arkansas
