= Linebarger House =

Historic house in Arkansas, United States

- U.S. National Register of Historic Places
- U.S. Historic district – Contributing property
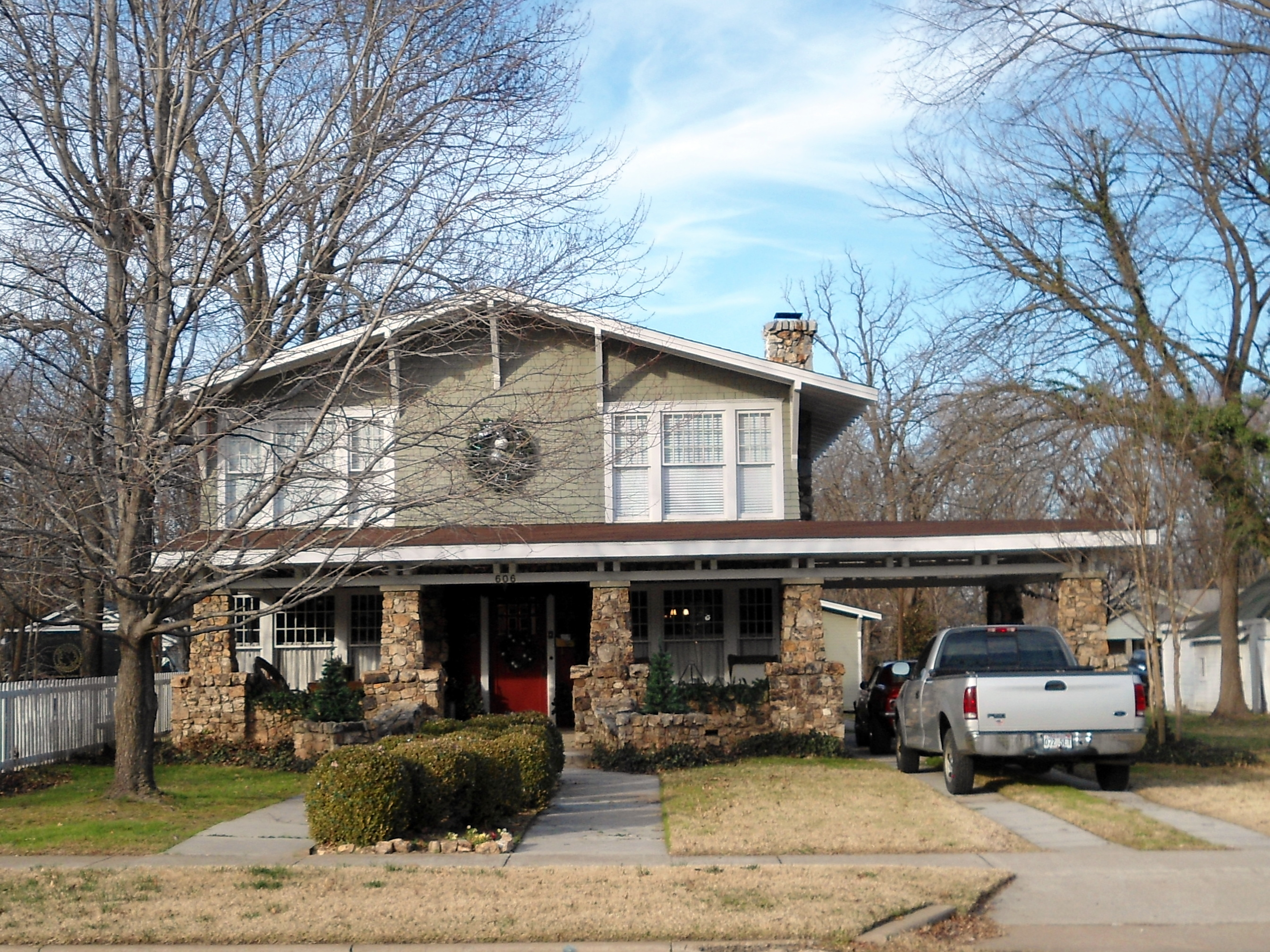

- Location within Arkansas Location within the United States
- Location: 606 W. Central, Bentonville, Arkansas
- Coordinates: 36°22′21″N 94°12′58″W
- Area: less than one acre
- Built: 1920
- Built by: C.A/ Linebarger
- Architectural style: Bungalow/American Craftsman
- Part of: Bentonville West Central Avenue Historic District (ID92001349)
- MPS: Benton County MRA
- NRHP reference No.: 87002335

Significant dates
- Added to NRHP: January 28, 1988
- Designated CP: October 22, 1992

The Linebarger House is a historic house at 606 West Central Avenue in Bentonville, Arkansas, U.S.A. This two-story American Craftsman-style house was built in 1920 by C. A. Linebarger, one of the principal developers of the Bella Vista resort area north of Bentonville. As one of the first Craftsman houses built, it played a significant role in popularizing the style in the region, with its deep porch whose roof is supported by stone porch piers, wide eaves with decorative supporting brackets, and exposed rafter tails.

The house was listed on the National Register of Historic Places in 1988.

== See also ==
- National Register of Historic Places listings in Benton County, Arkansas
