= American Indian Museum =

An American Indian Museum is a museum that focuses on the history, culture and arts of North American native peoples. Specifically, it may refer to:

- National Museum of the American Indian, Washington D.C.
  - George Gustav Heye Center, or the National Museum of the American Indian–New York, New York City
- Iroquois Indian Museum in Howes Cave, New York
- Autry Museum of the American West, in Los Angeles, California, which includes the Southwest Museum of the American Indian Collection
- Wheelwright Museum of the American Indian in Santa Fe, New Mexico

== See also ==
- Museum of Native American History, in Bentonville, Arkansas
- Category:Native American museums in the United States
