= Massey Hotel =

- U.S. National Register of Historic Places
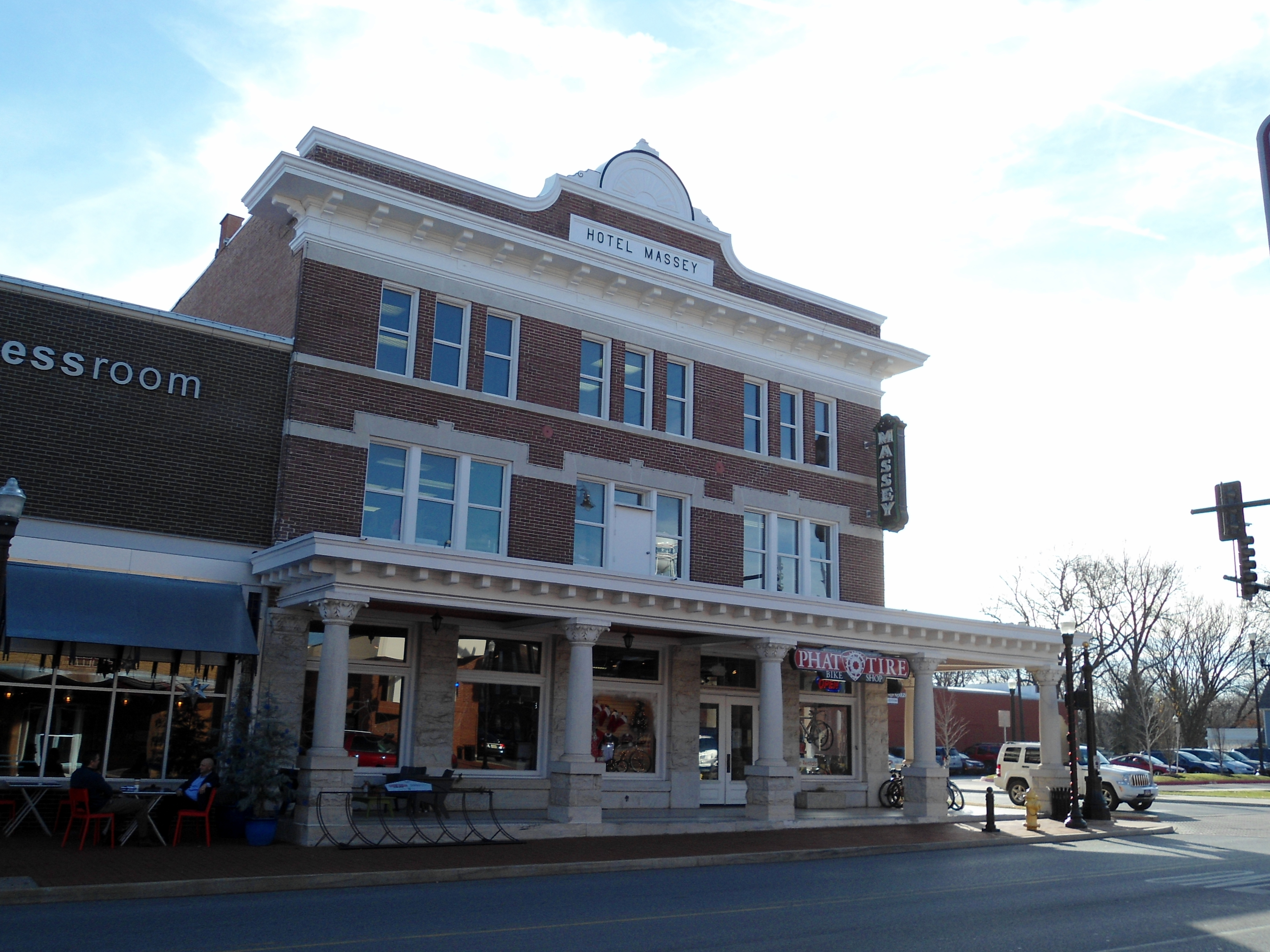

- Location within Arkansas Location within the United States
- Location: 125 W Central Ave (AR 72), Bentonville, Arkansas
- Coordinates: 36°22′19″N 94°12′35″W
- Area: less than one acre
- Built: 1909
- Architectural style: Second Renaissance Revival
- NRHP reference No.: 78000574
- Added to NRHP: December 1, 1978

The Hotel Massey (also Town House Hotel) is a former hotel in the Downtown district of Bentonville, Arkansas, built in 1910 in the Renaissance Revival architectural style. The historic property replaced the Eagle Hotel, which had been on the site since 1840. Many businesses have occupied the hotel's first floor, and the structure has contained the Bentonville Public Library twice. Coupled with Massey Hotel's community heritage, the building's architectural style is uncommon in Arkansas, and even more rare in the Ozarks. With this duality of significance, the property was added to the National Register of Historic Places in 1978.

== Location ==
Located at the intersection of Central Avenue (Highway 72) and A Street, the hotel is located in the Original Town plat of Bentonville, today known as Downtown Bentonville. Historically, the intersection was the junction of US Highway 71, Highway 72, and Highway 100, with US 71 turning left and following Central Avenue on its path north at the junction. As US 71 was the major through highway, the hotel was easily accessible by many travelers during its early history. US 71 was later rerouted to bypass downtown, with the A Street/Central Avenue route seeing redesignation as U.S. Route 71B (US 71B). This routing also has changed, with US 71B now rerouted to the west away from downtown. Even without the through traffic, the district has seen significant redevelopment upon opening of Crystal Bridges Museum of American Art north of the town square. The increased tourist traffic related to the museum has made Downtown Bentonville one of the state's most popular tourism destinations.

== History ==
The Massey Hotel replaced the Eagle Hotel, which had stood on the same corner since 1840. The Eagle Hotel was also a historically significant property, housing Union general Franz Sigel during the Civil War prior to the Battle of Pea Ridge. However, the property had deteriorated, containing a monument shop beginning around 1900 until it was destroyed for redevelopment as the Hotel Massey in 1908.

Construction began in February 1909, and the grand opening ceremony was held on June 28, 1910. The 240 guests were welcomed by an orchestra, with a reception and open house following the hotel's opening. In November 1918, the city's first public library was established in the hotel's east room. This library would later close due to a lack of funding. However, several other shops and businesses were located on the Hotel Massey's first floor, including the ticket office for the train to Rogers.

A fire in 1975 devastated the building, and it was left vacant for over a year following the fire. In 1977, Jim Walton, Sam Walton, and Helen Walton purchased the Massey Hotel building. They renovated the structure into office space, with the Bentonville Public Library on the first floor. The library opened on November 11, 1979 and operated in the Massey Hotel for 27 years, before outgrowing the historic structure and moving to its current location. The Massey Hotel also temporarily housed some Crystal Bridges works prior to the museum's opening in 2011.

== Architecture ==
The three-story brick structure displays many common elements of the restrained Second Renaissance Revival architectural style, including a fenestrated porch along Central Avenue and A Street, stone belt course and frieze, and ornamented pediment bearing the structure's name. The porch roof is supported by round stone Romanesque columns atop rusticated granite pedestals. Above the columns are a cornice and frieze with a bracketed soffett. Both the tops of the columns and the brackets along the building wall bear acanthus leaf ornamentation. A larger-scale cornice matching the porch, brick parapet, and cast stone cap top the building.

A flat porch roof formerly housed a promenade, as indicated by two doors still present today. Inside, the former parlor and ballroom contained tile floors and pressed tin ceilings. The first floor has fixed windows with transoms, while the upper floors bear double-hung windows. All window openings bear stone lintels.

== See also ==
- National Register of Historic Places listings in Benton County, Arkansas
