= Col. Samuel W. Peel House =

Historic house in Arkansas, United States

- U.S. National Register of Historic Places
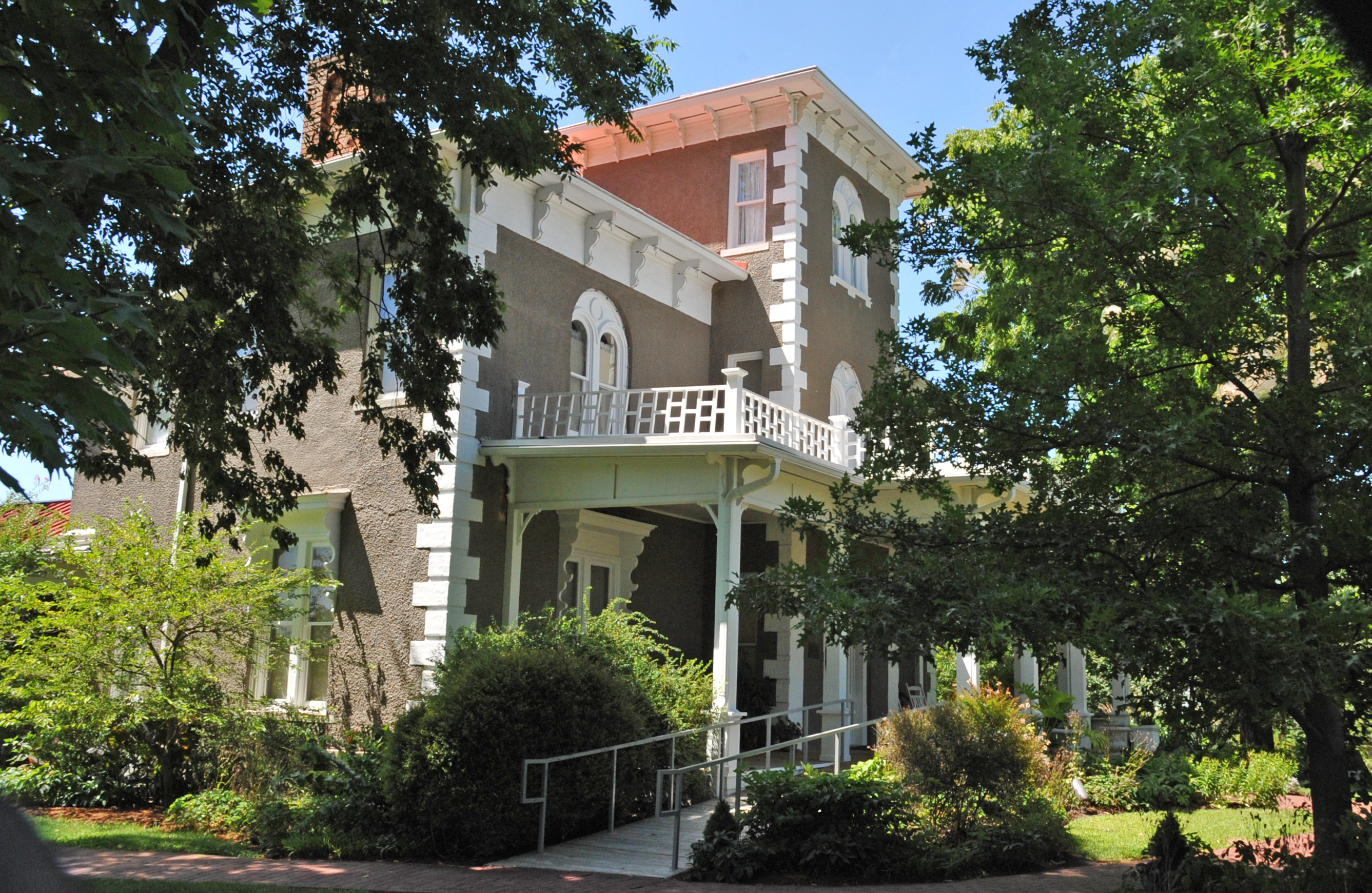

- Location within Arkansas Location within the United States
- Location: 400 S. Walton Blvd., Bentonville, Arkansas
- Coordinates: 36°22′9″N 94°13′18″W
- Area: 1.3 acres (0.53 ha)
- Built: 1875
- Built by: John C. Sheffield (fireplaces only)
- Architectural style: Italianate
- NRHP reference No.: 95000571
- Added to NRHP: May 4, 1995

The Col. Samuel W. Peel House is a historic house museum, also known as the Peel Mansion Museum, at 400 South Walton Boulevard in Bentonville, Arkansas. It is a two-story stuccoed brick masonry structure, with a three-story hip-roofed tower at the center of its front facade. The house was built c. 1875 by Samuel W. Peel, a prominent local politician and businessman. After serving in the Confederate Army in the American Civil War, Peel studied law and practiced for many years in Bentonville. He served several terms in the United States Congress, and helped establish the First National Bank of Bentonville. Despite later alterations, the house is one of the finest Italianate mansions in the region.

The house was listed on the National Register of Historic Places in 1995. The house is open for tours year-round, with a limited schedule in January and February.

== See also ==
- National Register of Historic Places listings in Benton County, Arkansas
