= National Register of Champion Trees =

American tree registry

The National Register of Champion Trees is a list of the largest tree specimens found in the United States as reported to American Forests by the public. A tree on this list is called a National Champion Tree.

The National Register of Champion Trees has been maintained since 1940 by American Forests. To be eligible, a species must be recognized as native or naturalized in the United States.

American Forests uses the following formula to calculate a point score for each tree so that they may be compared to others:

Trunk Circumference (in inches) + Height (in feet) + 1/4 Average Crown Spread (in feet) = Total Points

The National Register of Champion Trees is updated yearly and is available to view online. In addition to the national list, states, counties, and cities maintain their own list of local Champion Trees.

== See also ==
- Alabama Champion Tree Program
- Arkansas Champion Tree Program
- Flora of Door County, Wisconsin § Individual trees
- List of individual trees
- The Big Tree, national champion Bur Oak in Missouri
- Trees of New York City § Notable trees
