= Bentonville Confederate Monument =

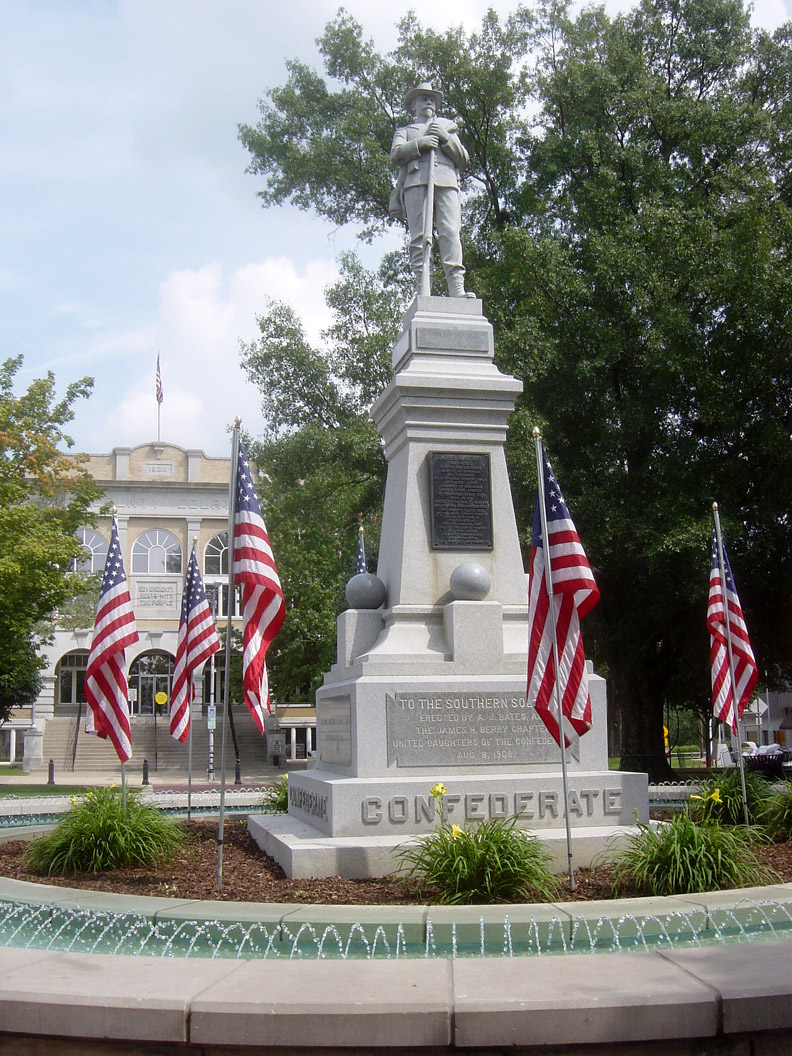
- The monument in 2006
- Interactive map of Bentonville Confederate Monument
- Location: Bentonville, Arkansas
- Coordinates: 36.37265°N 94.20847°W
- Type: Confederate Monument
- Material: Granite
- Height: 20 feet
- Opening date: 1908

The Bentonville Confederate Monument was installed in Bentonville, Arkansas, United States. It was removed from the town square in September 2020 and relocated to the private James H. Berry Park in July 2023.

== Description and history ==
Placed in the center of Square Park, the 20 feet (6.1 m) granite statue of a Confederate soldier standing at parade rest was placed by the United Daughters of the Confederacy in 1908. A later plaque honors James Henderson Berry, a Confederate soldier with the 16th Arkansas Infantry Regiment who would later become the first Arkansas governor from Benton County. The inscription reads "They Fought For Home and Fatherland. Their Names are Borne On Honors Shield. Their Record Is With God.".

The statue was manufactured in Barre, Vermont.

Although the park was deeded to the United Daughters of the Confederacy for use as a park in perpetuity, the chapter had disbanded prior to 1996. Benton County took control of the park, and allowed the City of Bentonville to take over care and maintenance.

The monument was added to the National Register of Historic Places (NRHP) in 1996.

In September 2020, after years of controversy over Confederate monuments nationwide, the monument was removed from the Bentonville Square.

In February 2022, the Bentonville city planning commission announced a plan for the statue to be placed at a new park. The privately owned and operated park, named after James H. Berry, will feature the Statue and original base as the centerpiece, with the park located next to the Bentonville Cemetery. The new park opened in July 2023 and the statue is now back in public view.

=== Inscriptions ===
North face:

THEIR NAMES ARE BORNE ON HONOR'S SHIELD. THEIR RECORD IS WITH GOD.
CONFEDERATE

East face:

THEY FOUGHT FOR HOME AND FATHERLAND
CONFEDERATE

South face:

1861–65
CONFEDERATE

West face:

TO THE SOUTHERN SOLDIERS
ERECTED BY A.J. BATES AND THE JAMES H. BERRY CHAPTER UNITED DAUGHTERS OF THE CONFEDERACY
AUG. 8, 1908
CONFEDERATE

Metal plate added to west face on January 30, 1914:

JAMES H. BERRY
1841–1913
SOLDIER AND STATESMAN
BELOVED OF ARKANSAS
2ND LIEUTENANT
CO. E 16TH ARK. INFANTRY, C.S.A
LEGISLATOR – JURIST
GOVERNOR OF ARKANSAS
UNITED STATES SENATOR
HE PERFORMED EVERY DUTY
WITH AN EYE
SINGLE TO THE PUBLIC WELFARE
AND HIS OWN UNBLEMISHED HONOR
THIS TABLET IS PLACED HERE
BY THE JAMES H. BERRY CHAPTER
UNITED DAUGHTERS OF
THE CONFEDERACY
THE PAT CLEBURNE CAMP
SONS OF CONFEDERATE VETERANS
AND OTHER FRIENDS
IN LOVING REMEMBRANCE
AND APPRECIATION
OF HIS NOBLE LIFE AND CHARACTER.

== See also ==
- 1908 in art
- Downtown Bentonville
- List of Confederate monuments and memorials
- List of monuments and memorials removed during the George Floyd protests
- National Register of Historic Places listings in Benton County, Arkansas
