= Bentonville, Arkansas =

Bentonville
- City
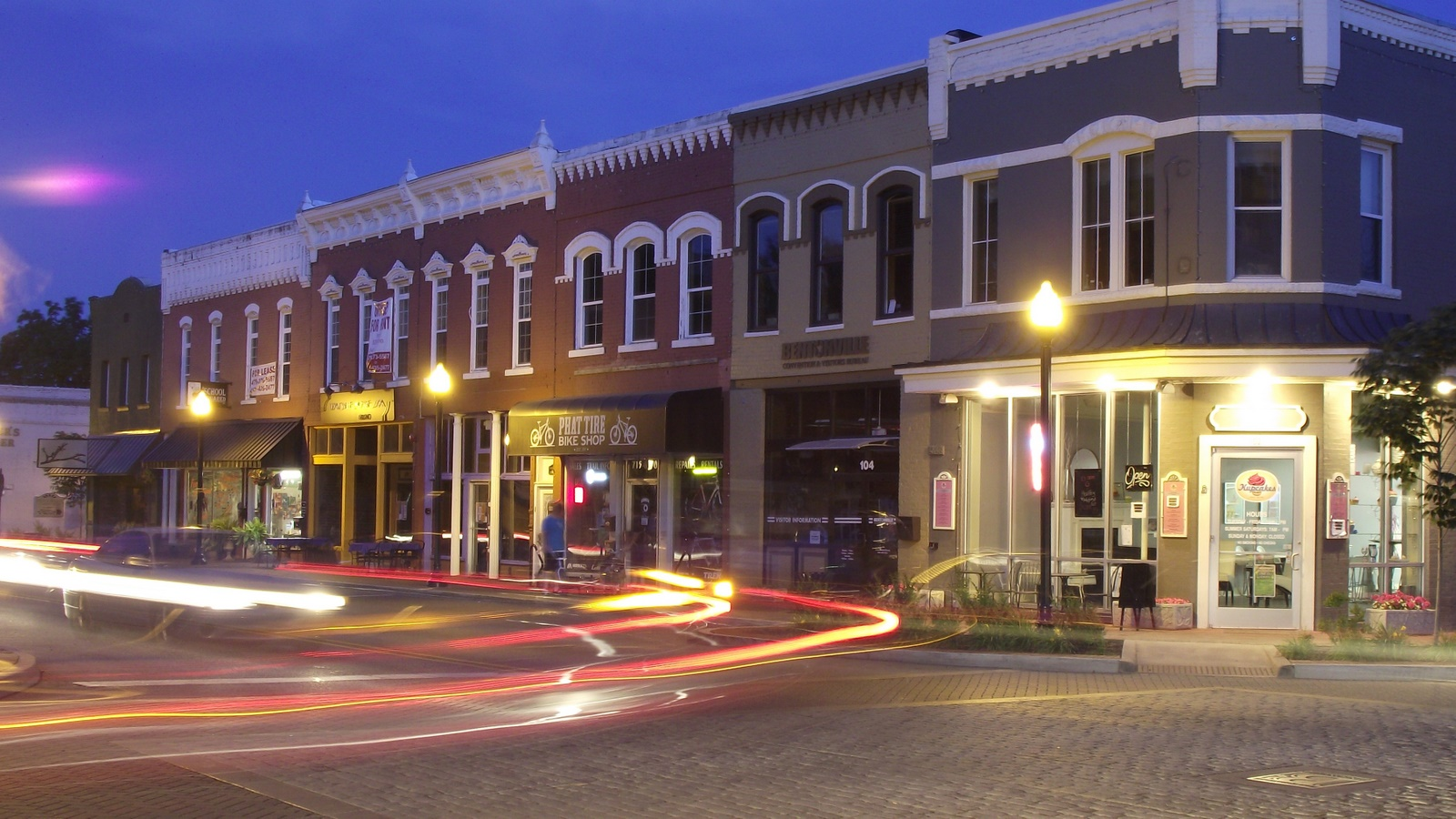
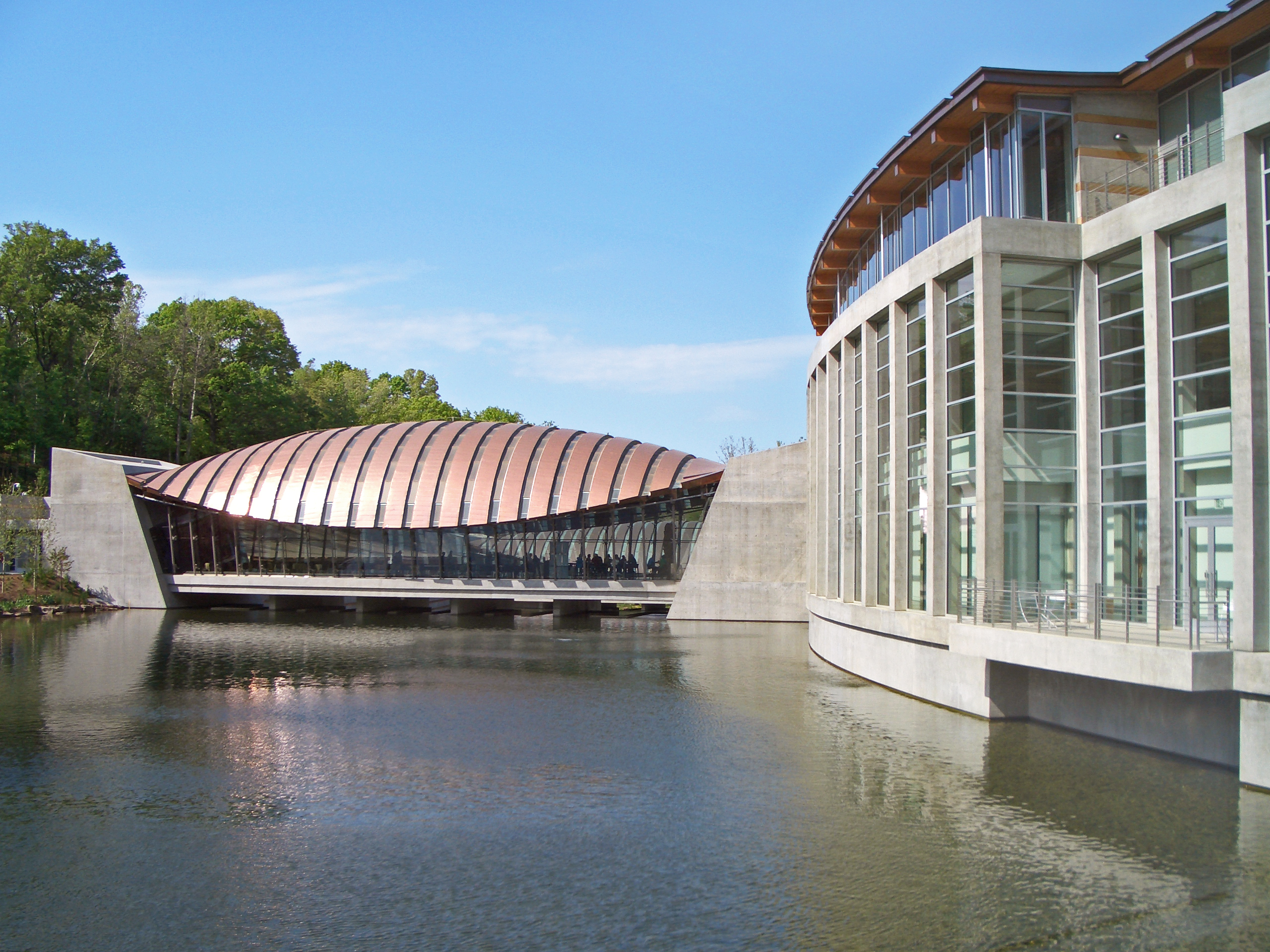
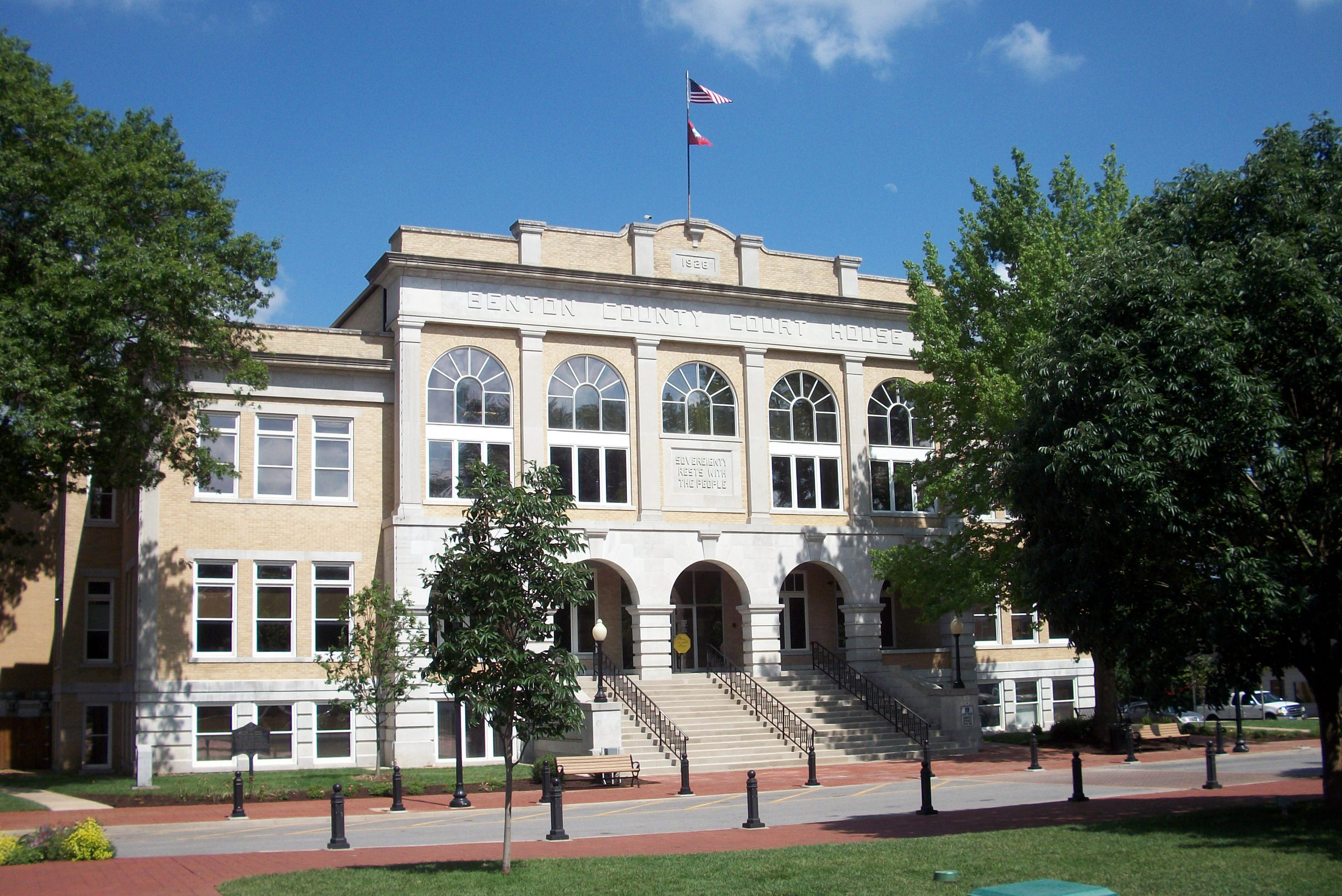
- Downtown Bentonville at night Crystal Bridges Museum of American Art Benton County Courthouse

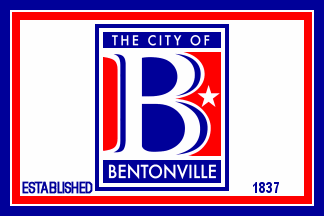
- Flag Logo
- Interactive map of Bentonville
- Location within Arkansas Location within the United States
- Coordinates: 36°21′10″N 94°13′52″W
- Country: United States
- State: Arkansas
- County: Benton
- Incorporated: April 3, 1873
- Named for: Originally Osage Indians; Thomas Hart Benton

Government
  - Mayor: Stephanie Orman

Area
  - Total: 34.25 sq mi (88.70 km^{2})
  - Land: 34.05 sq mi (88.19 km^{2})
  - Water: 0.20 sq mi (0.52 km^{2})
- Elevation: 1,266 ft (386 m)

Population (2020)
  - Total: 54,164
  - Estimate (2025): 63,057 ▲
  - Density: 1,590.7/sq mi (614.19/km^{2})
- Time zone: UTC-6 (Central (CST))
  - Summer (DST): UTC-5 (CDT)
- ZIP Codes: 72712, 72713, 72716
- Area code: 479
- FIPS code: 05-05320
- GNIS feature ID: 2403857
- Website: bentonville.ar.gov

Bentonville is a city in and the county seat of Benton County, Arkansas, United States. The city is centrally located in the county with Rogers adjacent to the east. The city proper had a population of 54,164 at the 2020 census, making it the ninth-most populous city in Arkansas. It is one of the four main cities in the three-county Northwest Arkansas metropolitan area, with 546,725 residents in 2020.

The original store of Sam Walton, who later founded Walmart, the world's largest retailer, can be found in Bentonville, along with the retailer's headquarters and 350-acre (140 ha) home office campus. Bentonville is one of the fastest-growing cities in the state.

== History ==
=== Early history ===
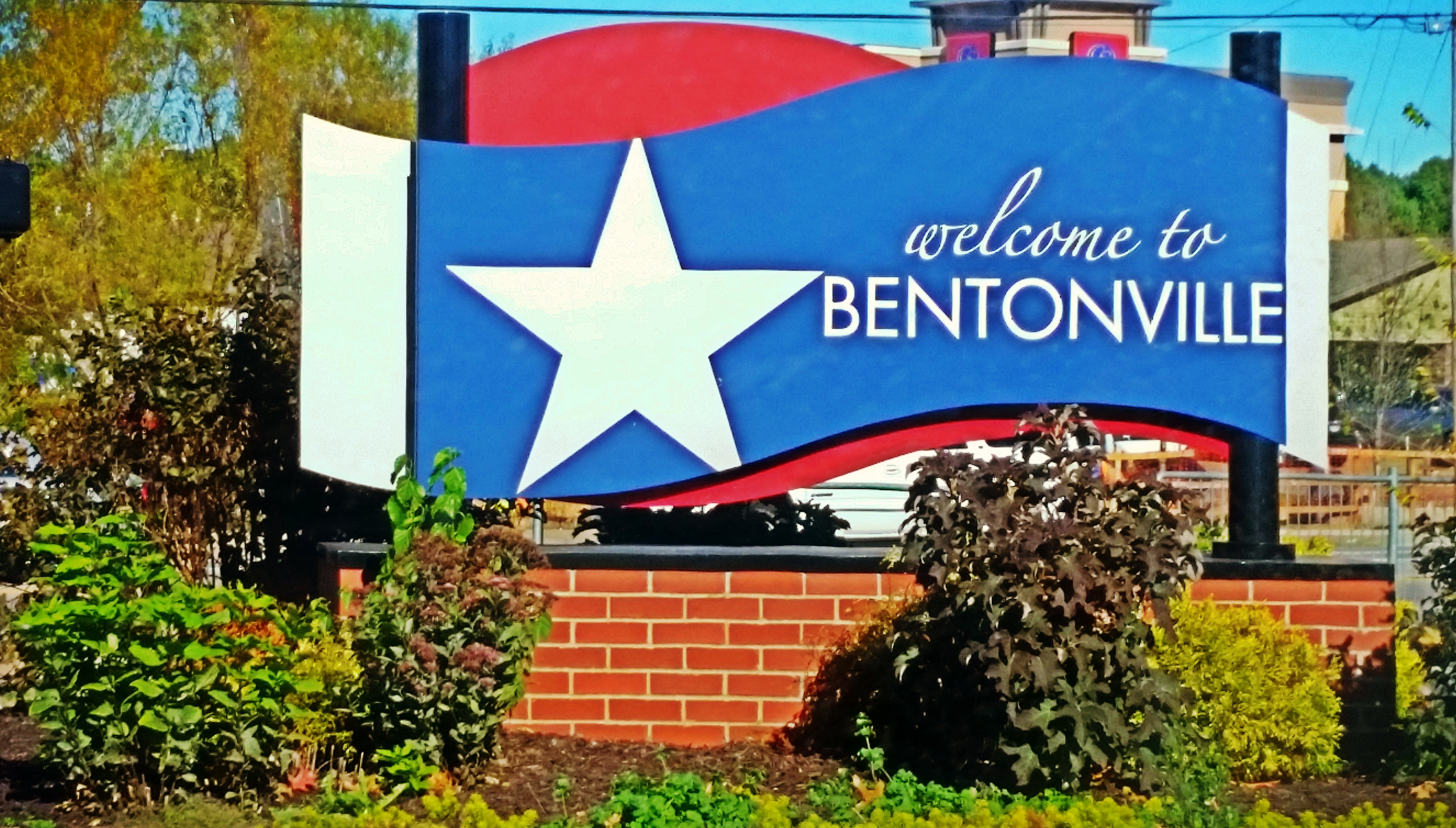
"Welcome to Bentonville" board put up at many entrances to the city

The first known use by humans of the area which is now known as Bentonville, was as hunting grounds by the Osage Nation who lived in Missouri. The Osage would leave their settlements to hunt in present-day Benton County for months at a time before returning to their families. European settlers first inhabited the area around 1837 and named their settlement "Osage". By this time, the Osage had ceased using the area for hunting, and the European settlers began to establish farms. Upon establishment of Benton County on September 30, 1836, Osage was deemed a suitable site for the county seat, and the town square was established as the home of county government the following year. Osage was renamed Bentonville in honor of Thomas Hart Benton, a senator from Missouri who strongly supported Arkansas statehood.

=== Early statehood and Civil War ===
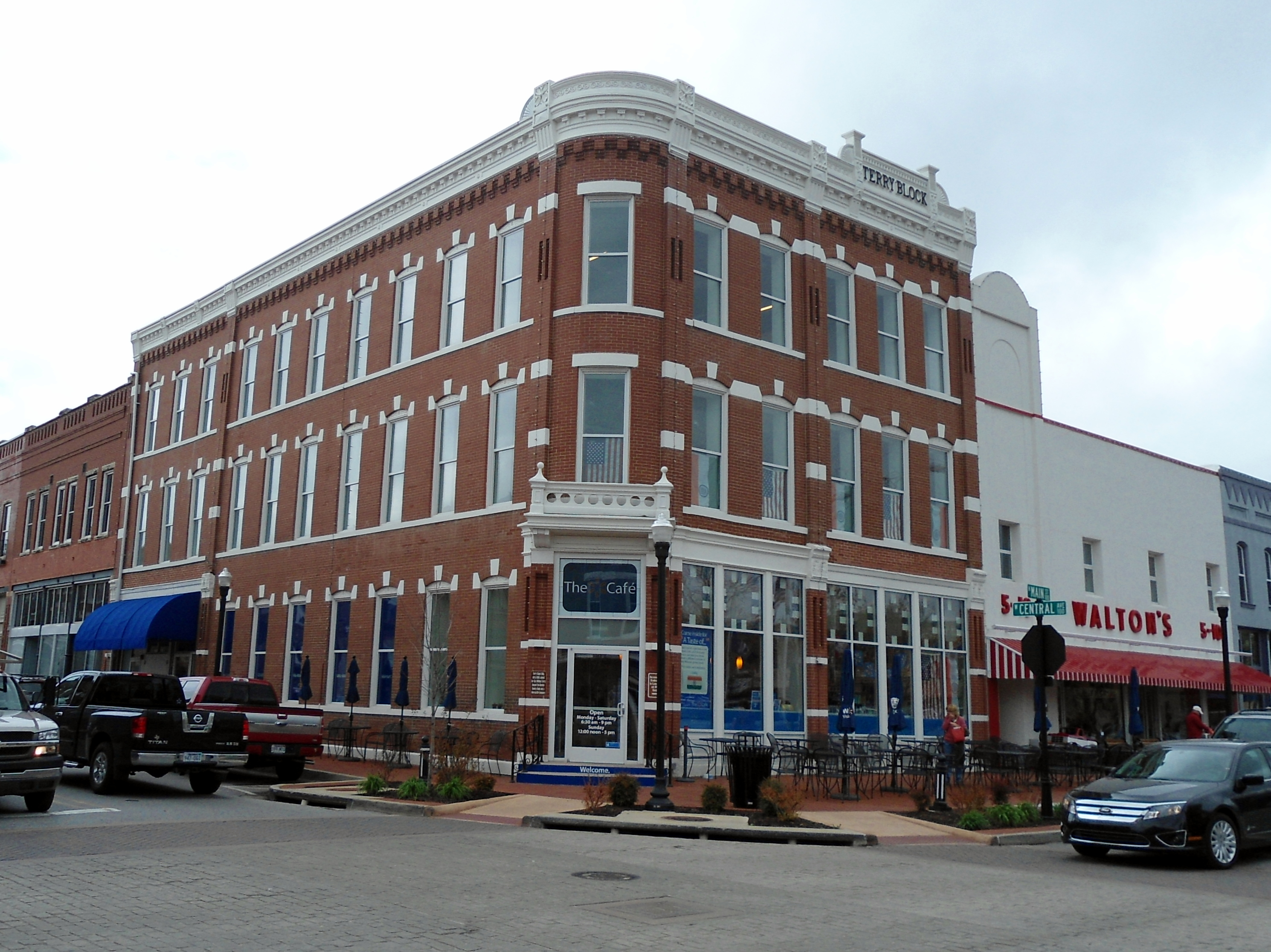
The Terry Block Building sat the southwest corner of the Bentonville Town Square. Built in 1888, the building previously housed the Walmart Museum, adjacent to the original Walton's Five and Dime, but in October 2023 it was razed as part of a renovation of the museum complex.

Two years after Arkansas received statehood in 1836, thousands of Cherokee people from Georgia passed through Benton County as part of the Trail of Tears route to the Indian Territory in what is now Oklahoma.

Although no Civil War battles were fought inside Bentonville, the city was occupied by both armies and saw almost all of its buildings burned. The 2nd Arkansas Mounted Rifles brigade was organized in the summer of 1861 and inducted into the Confederate States Army in a field outside of town. Bentonville was a staging point for the Confederate army prior to the Battle of Pea Ridge, fought about 12 miles (19 km) northeast of town, and the town saw a brief skirmish just prior to the battle.

The city began to rebuild about a decade after incorporation on April 3, 1873, with many of these Reconstruction Era buildings today serving as the oldest structures in Bentonville.

The first railroad line into the area bypassed Bentonville, instead creating the nearby town of Rogers. So in 1883, a corporation called the Bentonville Railroad Company (a forerunner of the Arkansas and Oklahoma Railroad) proceeded to link Rogers with Bentonville, about six miles. That line has changed hands over time, but remains in use.

With good transportation available, the area established a vibrant apple industry, with Benton County becoming the leading apple producing county in the nation in 1901.

=== Twentieth century ===
In May 1922, the first Ku Klux Klan chapter was opened in Bentonville. By 1923, there was documentation of at least 162 men who were members of the Klan. Most of the town's most prominent citizens were charter members of the Klan chapters, including mayor Lee Seamster, his successor Tom Curt, the Benton County sheriff and several deputies, and Circuit Judge William A. Dickson, as well as half of the aldermen on the city council.

In the 1920s and 1930s the county developed a reputation as a leader in poultry production that continued into the World War II years, and which the area still maintains today. The post-war economy helped Bentonville grow, with many new businesses starting.

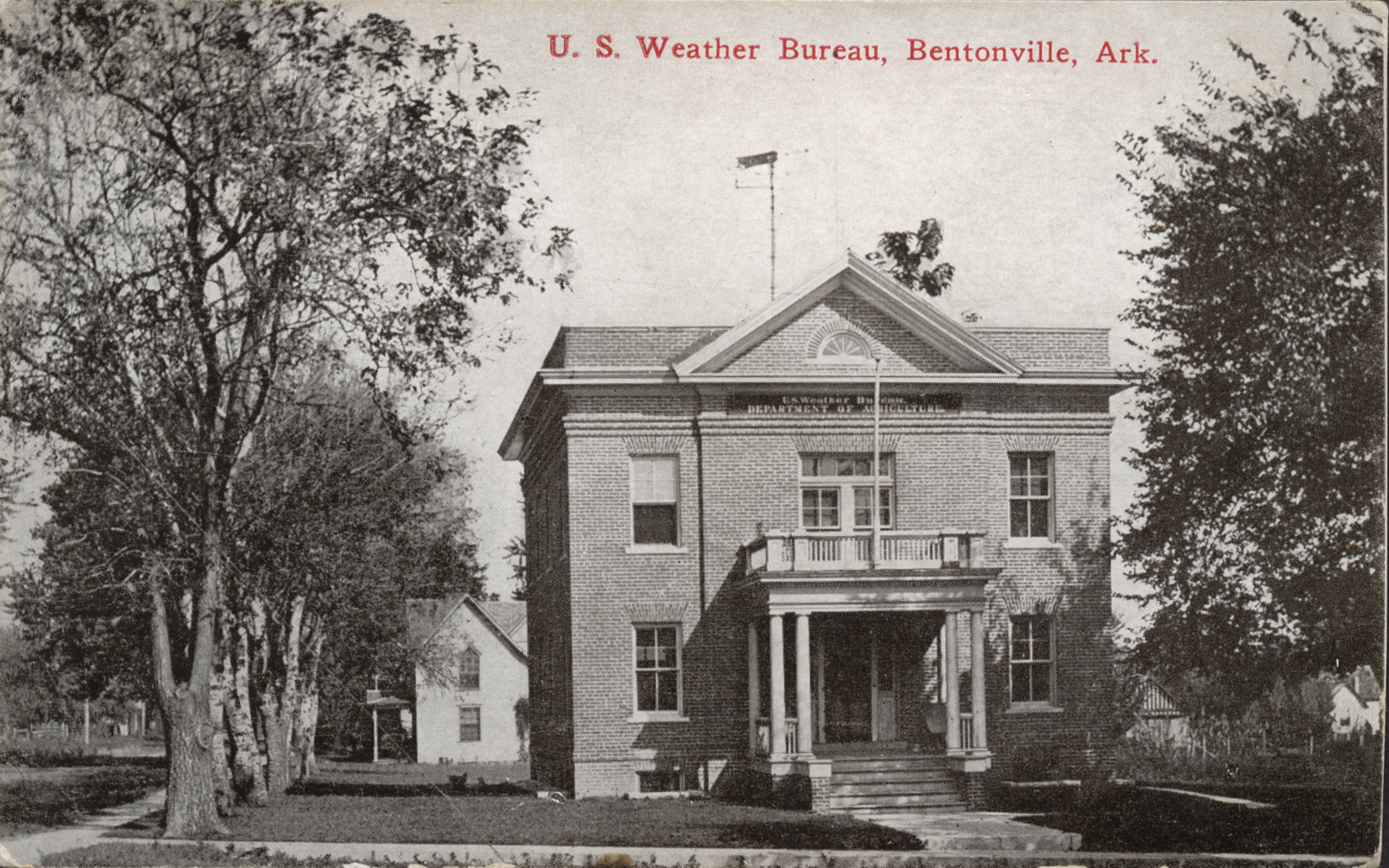
US Weather Bureau Bentonville building c. 1900

In 1950, Sam Walton bought the Harrison Variety Store on the Bentonville town square. He fully remodeled the building and opened "Walton's 5 and 10 Variety Store" on March 18, 1951. This single store eventually led to the creation of Walmart, the world's largest retailer, which still strongly influences the community today.

The late twentieth and early twenty-first century has seen a dramatic reduction in the manufacturing sector in Bentonville, corresponding with an increase in tourism and entertainment focused on the natural setting and outdoor opportunities of the area as well as the Crystal Bridges Museum of American Art, which opened in 2011. This has resulted in Bentonville being the fastest growing city in Arkansas, and the larger Northwest Arkansas area one of the fastest growing in the United States.

== Geography ==
According to the United States Census Bureau, the city has a total area of 31.5 square miles (81.6 km^{2}), of which 31.3 square miles (81.0 km^{2}) is land and 0.19 square miles (0.5 km^{2}), or 0.67%, is water.

=== Metropolitan area ===
The Northwest Arkansas region consists of three Arkansas counties: Benton, Madison, and Washington. The area had a population of 347,045 at the 2000 census which had increased to 463,204 by the 2010 Census (an increase of 33.47 percent). The Metropolitan Statistical Area does not consist of the usual principal-city-with-suburbs morphology; instead Bentonville is bordered to the east by Rogers, the north by Bella Vista, and the west by Centerton. The Northwest Arkansas National Airport is located to the southwest of Bentonville and is used to connect all of the northwest Arkansas region to the rest of the nation. For more than the last decade, Northwest Arkansas has been one of the fastest-growing regions in the United States.

=== Climate ===
Bentonville lies in the humid subtropical climate zone (Köppen Cfa) with influence from the humid continental climate type. Bentonville experiences all four seasons and does receive cold air masses from the north. July is the hottest month of the year, with an average high of 89 °F (32 °C) and an average low of 66 °F (19 °C). Temperatures above 90 °F (32.2 °C) are common, with a high of 100 °F (37.8 °C) occurring about once per year on average. January is the coldest month with an average high of 46 °F (8 °C) and an average low of 24 °F (−4 °C). The city's highest temperature was 114 °F (45.6 °C), recorded in 1954. The lowest temperature recorded was −16 °F (−26.7 °C), in 1996.

Climate data for Bentonville, Arkansas (1991–2020 normals, extremes 1943–present)
Month	Jan	Feb	Mar	Apr	May	Jun	Jul	Aug	Sep	Oct	Nov	Dec	Year
Record high °F (°C)	76 (24)	86 (30)	89 (32)	96 (36)	93 (34)	103 (39)	114 (46)	107 (42)	106 (41)	95 (35)	85 (29)	78 (26)	114 (46)
Mean daily maximum °F (°C)	46.2 (7.9)	51.4 (10.8)	60.0 (15.6)	69.4 (20.8)	76.6 (24.8)	84.8 (29.3)	89.4 (31.9)	89.5 (31.9)	82.2 (27.9)	71.4 (21.9)	59.0 (15.0)	49.2 (9.6)	69.1 (20.6)
Daily mean °F (°C)	35.2 (1.8)	39.3 (4.1)	47.8 (8.8)	56.7 (13.7)	65.3 (18.5)	73.8 (23.2)	78.0 (25.6)	77.3 (25.2)	69.7 (20.9)	58.7 (14.8)	47.4 (8.6)	38.1 (3.4)	57.3 (14.1)
Mean daily minimum °F (°C)	24.2 (−4.3)	27.2 (−2.7)	35.5 (1.9)	44.0 (6.7)	53.9 (12.2)	62.9 (17.2)	66.5 (19.2)	65.2 (18.4)	57.2 (14.0)	45.9 (7.7)	35.9 (2.2)	26.9 (−2.8)	45.4 (7.4)
Record low °F (°C)	−15 (−26)	−16 (−27)	−12 (−24)	16 (−9)	27 (−3)	40 (4)	45 (7)	44 (7)	30 (−1)	18 (−8)	5 (−15)	−15 (−26)	−16 (−27)
Average precipitation inches (mm)	2.70 (69)	2.66 (68)	4.24 (108)	4.78 (121)	6.26 (159)	5.49 (139)	3.87 (98)	2.71 (69)	4.05 (103)	3.39 (86)	3.92 (100)	3.26 (83)	47.33 (1,202)
Average snowfall inches (cm)	3.2 (8.1)	2.3 (5.8)	2.6 (6.6)	0.0 (0.0)	0.0 (0.0)	0.0 (0.0)	0.0 (0.0)	0.0 (0.0)	0.0 (0.0)	0.0 (0.0)	0.2 (0.51)	1.2 (3.0)	9.5 (24)
Average precipitation days (≥ 0.01 in)	6.1	5.2	7.9	8.6	9.8	8.9	6.9	5.6	6.6	6.3	7.2	6.1	85.2
Average snowy days (≥ 0.1 in)	0.8	0.8	0.4	0.0	0.0	0.0	0.0	0.0	0.0	0.0	0.3	0.8	3.1
Source: NOAA

== Demographics ==
Historical population
Census	Pop.	Note	%±
1880	696		—
1890	1,677		140.9%
1900	1,843		9.9%
1910	1,956		6.1%
1920	2,313		18.3%
1930	2,203		−4.8%
1940	2,359		7.1%
1950	2,942		24.7%
1960	3,649		24.0%
1970	5,508		50.9%
1980	8,756		59.0%
1990	11,257		28.6%
2000	19,730		75.3%
2010	35,301		78.9%
2020	54,164		53.4%
2025 (est.)	63,057	▲	16.4%
U.S. Decennial Census

=== Racial and ethnic composition ===
Bentonville city, Arkansas – Racial and ethnic composition Note: the US Census treats Hispanic/Latino as an ethnic category. This table excludes Latinos from the racial categories and assigns them to a separate category. Hispanics/Latinos may be of any race.
Race / Ethnicity (NH = Non-Hispanic)	Pop. 2000	Pop. 2010	Pop. 2020	% 2000	% 2010	% 2020
White alone (NH)	17,346	27,193	34,687	87.92%	77.03%	64.04%
Black or African American alone (NH)	165	850	1,653	0.84%	2.41%	3.05%
Native American or Alaska Native alone (NH)	259	417	493	1.31%	1.18%	0.91%
Asian alone (NH)	470	2,919	8,427	2.38%	8.27%	15.56%
Native Hawaiian or Pacific Islander alone (NH)	7	69	228	0.04%	0.20%	0.42%
Other race alone (NH)	11	48	213	0.06%	0.14%	0.39%
Mixed race or Multiracial (NH)	274	731	3,029	1.39%	2.07%	5.59%
Hispanic or Latino (any race)	1,198	3,074	5,434	6.07%	8.71%	10.03%
Total	19,730	35,301	54,164	100.00%	100.00%	100.00%

=== 2020 census ===
As of the 2020 census, Bentonville had a population of 54,164, with 18,223 households and 12,212 families. The median age was 32.2 years. 28.2% of residents were under the age of 18 and 8.2% were 65 years of age or older. For every 100 females there were 100.1 males, and for every 100 females age 18 and over there were 98.0 males age 18 and over.

97.6% of residents lived in urban areas, while 2.4% lived in rural areas.

There were 20,476 households in Bentonville, of which 40.2% had children under the age of 18 living in them. Of all households, 52.8% were married-couple households, 18.1% were households with a male householder and no spouse or partner present, and 23.0% were households with a female householder and no spouse or partner present. About 25.6% of all households were made up of individuals and 5.7% had someone living alone who was 65 years of age or older.

There were 22,436 housing units, of which 8.7% were vacant. The homeowner vacancy rate was 1.8% and the rental vacancy rate was 10.4%.

Racial composition as of the 2020 census
Race	Number	Percent
White	35,908	66.3%
Black or African American	1,695	3.1%
American Indian and Alaska Native	664	1.2%
Asian	8,455	15.6%
Native Hawaiian and Other Pacific Islander	230	0.4%
Some other race	2,193	4.0%
Two or more races	5,019	9.3%

=== 2000 census ===
As of the census of 2000, there were 19,730 people, 7,458 households, and 5,265 families residing in the city. The city grew substantially in the 1990s; the 1990 population was 11,257 and the city is expected to reach 50,000 people by the year 2030. According to the US Census, Bentonville and surrounding communities in Benton County is second in growth for Arkansas and among the 100 fastest-growing counties in the United States.

The population density was 928.9 inhabitants per square mile (358.7/km^{2}). There were 7,924 housing units at an average density of 373.1 per square mile (144.1/km^{2}). The racial makeup of the city was 90.92% White, 0.88% Black or African American, 1.33% Native American, 2.40% Asian, 0.04% Pacific Islander, 2.68% from other races, and 1.76% from two or more races. 6.07% of the population were Hispanic or Latino of any race.

The 2005 Special Census reported 24,837 Whites/non-Hispanic whites (86.8%), 2,428 Hispanics of any race (8.5%), 1,135 Asians (4.0%), and 510 Blacks/African Americans (1.8%).

There were 7,458 households, out of which 40.1% had children under the age of 18 living with them, 55.6% were married couples living together, 11.9% had a female householder with no husband present, and 29.4% are classified as non-families by the United States Census Bureau. 24.4% of all households were made up of individuals, and 6.7% had someone living alone who was 65 years of age or older. The average household size was 2.59 and the average family size was 3.11.

In the city, the population was spread out, with 29.5% under the age of 18, 9.8% from 18 to 24, 34.2% from 25 to 44, 17.9% from 45 to 64, and 8.5% who were 65 years of age or older. The median age was 31 years. For every 100 females, there were 93.6 males. For every 100 females age 18 and over, there were 91.3 males.

The median income for a household in the city was $39,936, and the median income for a family was $46,558. Males had a median income of $31,816 versus $23,761 for females. The per capita income for the city was $20,831. 10.3% of the population and 7.5% of families were below the poverty line. Out of the total people living in poverty, 13.7% are under the age of 18 and 10.9% are 65 or older.

== Economy ==
Bentonville's Top EmployersBentonville-Bella Vista Chamber of Commerce
Rank	Employer
1	Walmart Inc.
2	Northwest Health System
3	Mercy of Northwest Arkansas
4	Bentonville School District
5	Benton County, Arkansas
6	City of Bentonville
7	Northwest Arkansas Community College
8	Arvest Bank Group, Inc
9	Outdoor Cap Company
10	Community Publishers

Bentonville has been home to Walmart since Sam Walton purchased a store on the town square in 1950 and renamed it Walton's 5 & 10. The retailer continued a rapid growth, but Helen Walton wished to remain in Bentonville to raise the family, and thus by the time Walmart became the #1 Fortune 500 in 2002, it was still based in Bentonville. The former Walmart "Home Office" included more than 20 buildings throughout Bentonville, specifically along Walton Boulevard (US 71B) in the western part of the city. In 2017, Walmart announced their intention to construct a new central headquarters in Bentonville, consolidating many of their employees to a more centralized campus, with the first portion of their new 350-acre campus opening in January 2025.

The impact from the Walmart Home Office is multiplied by the over 1,100 prospective Walmart vendors who have established sales offices in the region. The large number of satellite offices for companies of almost every industry means a large number of transplants from around the United States live in or near Bentonville.

The entrepreneurial scene in Bentonville is growing, with co-working spaces and startup incubators being added over the last 5 years.

== Arts and culture ==
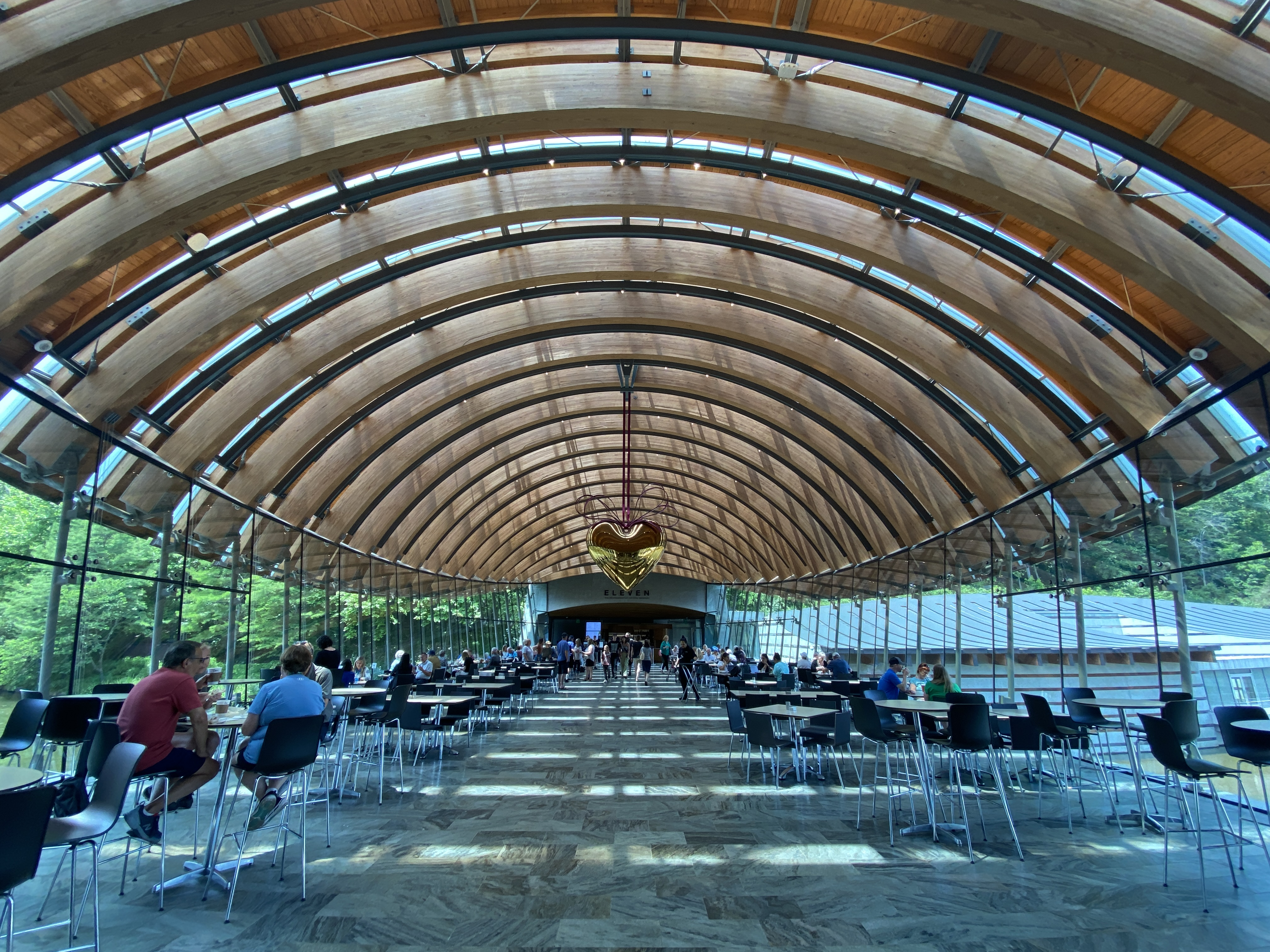
Opened in 2011, the Crystal Bridges Museum of American Art features a vast collection of American art.

Bentonville's culture is a combination of a southern city, small town, global business hub, and the surrounding Northwest Arkansas metro.

Bentonville shares many of the characteristics commonly given to Arkansas as a Southern state, yet it has also absorbed minor cultural influence from the Midwest and West. Located firmly in the Mid-South, Bentonville's culture is distinct and differs from the Delta portion of the state. Many of the city's first settlers came from North Georgia, North Alabama, Kentucky, North Carolina and Tennessee, because they found the Ozarks familiar, similar to the Appalachian Mountains back home. The uplands of Arkansas, including Northwest Arkansas, did not participate in large-scale plantation farming with slaves like the Arkansas Delta, instead electing to settle in small clusters, relying largely on subsistence agriculture and hunting rather than the settlement patterns common in the Midwest and Deep South. The "hillbilly" stereotype given to the Ozarks and Appalachians is largely a derivative of the difficult topography, tendency to settle in clusters, and mostly cashless self-sustaining economy found in those regions. Bentonville's large proportion of Southern Baptist and Methodist adherents does, however, reflect a trend often associated with the Deep South.

Due to Walmart's prominence in the city, Bentonville is also an international focal point for retail suppliers and other supporting businesses. According to the Bentonville-Bella Vista Chamber of Commerce, over 1,250 suppliers have offices in Northwest Arkansas in an attempt to secure or retain Walmart's business. Symbolic of Bentonville's complex culture was a cricket game played between PepsiCo and Walmart, spectated by their respective chief executives Indra Nooyi and Doug McMillon, chronicled in an article in The Wall Street Journal describing the complex Bentonville culture. The game was played on a baseball field in Bentonville not well suited for typical cricket, so the players adopted new rules. The city has a league with 18 teams and a host of fans, mostly derived from the thousands of Indian natives drawn to Bentonville by Walmart software and IT jobs. In late 2018 plans for a public cricket pitch were approved for a new park in the southwest of the city.

From the Walmart Museum on the downtown square to the over 20 buildings spread throughout the city, Walmart's Home Office has a presence throughout Bentonville. The Northwest Arkansas National Airport has direct commercial flights from many large destination cities not typical of airports its size due to the supplier community. Bentonville, and the recently opened Bentonville West (located in Centerton) High Schools, have programs to assist the sizable transient student population, including international students, for those who have recently relocated to the area.

=== Culture ===
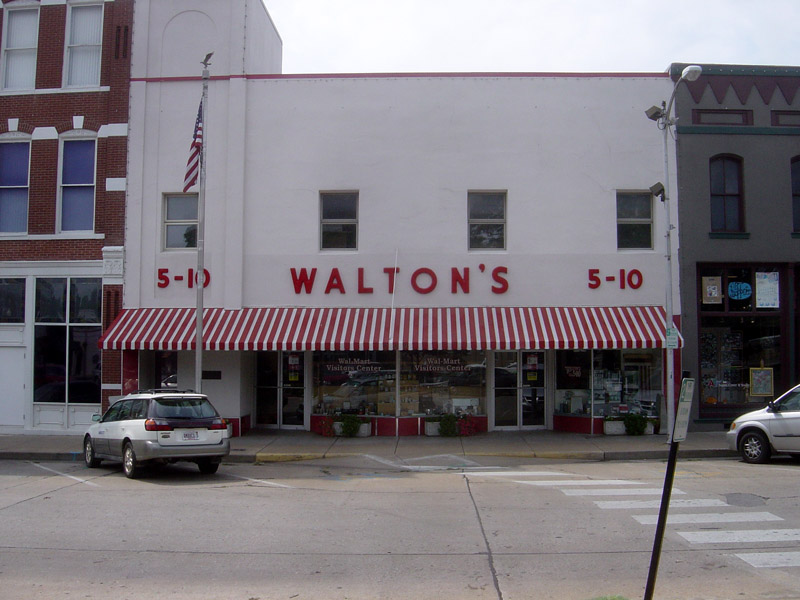
Sam Walton's original Walton's Five and Dime, now the Walmart Visitor Center on Bentonville town square

Crystal Bridges Museum of American Art is a $450 million museum of American Art designed by architect Moshe Safdie located within walking distance of downtown Bentonville. The museum was founded by Alice Walton in 2011 and contains many masterpieces from all eras of American art, including many works from Walton's private collection.

Other points of interest include:

- Walmart Museum: Located adjacent to Sam Walton's original Walton's Five and Dime which serves as a visitor center.
- Museum of Native American History: Museum showcasing Native American history, art, and culture.
- 21C Museum Hotel: Public museum and hotel featuring works of the 21st century.
- Scott Family Amazeum: An interactive children's museum
- The Momentary: A contemporary art museum and performance venue
- Bentonville Public Library

Beginning in 2015, the Bentonville Film Festival has been held annually the first week of May in Downtown Bentonville. Over 85,000 attendees take part in this week-long event.

=== Historic districts and properties ===
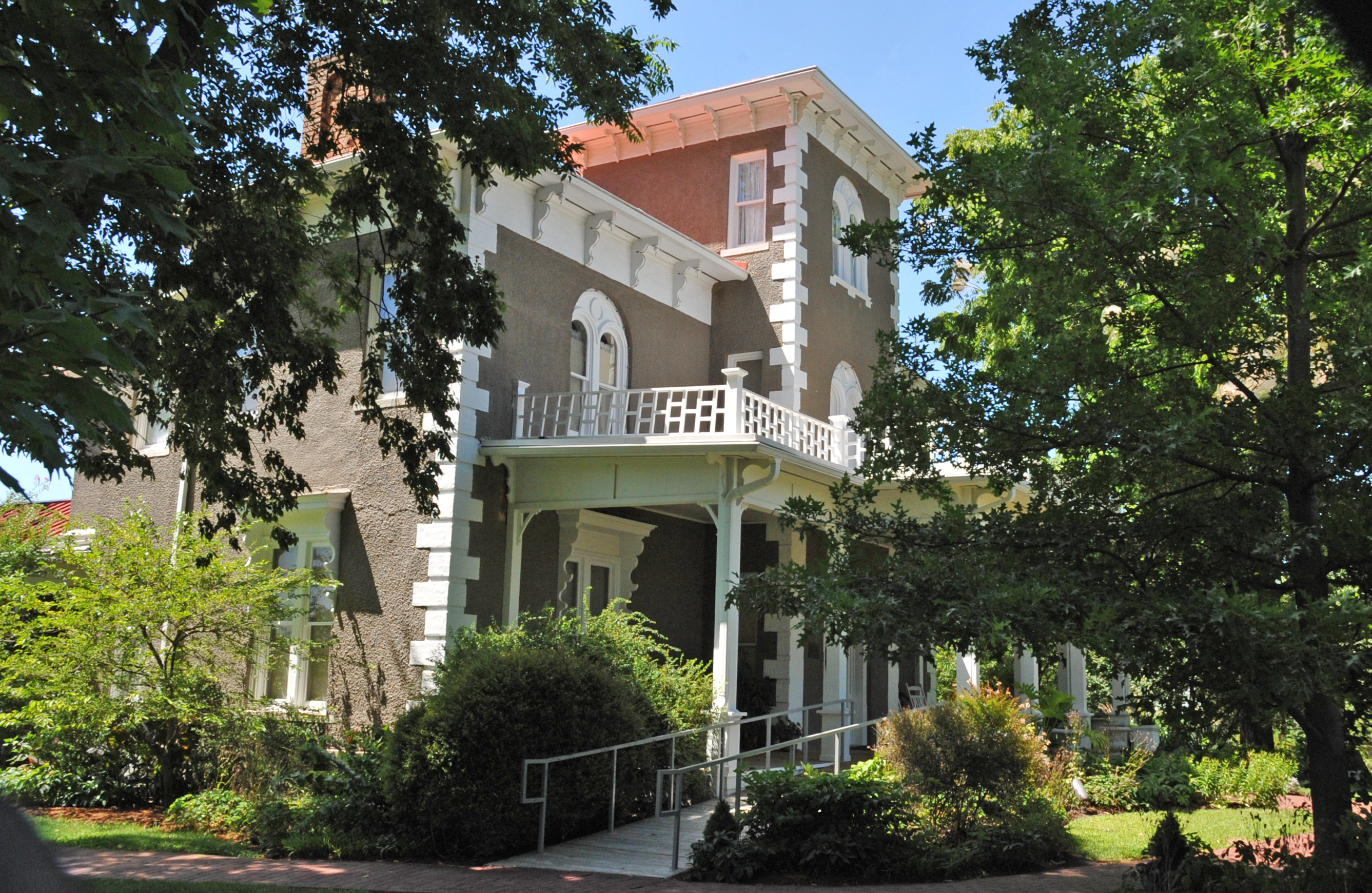
Peel Mansion, built in 1875, is now furnished with period pieces and offers tours and rentals for private events, such as weddings.

Bentonville contains over 30 listings on the National Register of Historic Places (NRHP), the official federal list of districts, sites, buildings, structures, and objects deemed worthy of preservation.

The city contains two residential historic districts, the Third Street Historic District and West Central Avenue Historic District. Both districts contain historic residences notable for their architectural styles and contributions to the city's early history. Together, over 40 houses are listed as contributing properties. However, being located in one of these historic districts does not protect a structure from being demolished or altered, and there are no city ordinances establishing historic preservation rules.

Preeminent individual residential listings within the historic districts include the Craig-Bryan House, Elliott House, James A. Rice House and the Rice House on "A" Street. Residential listing elsewhere in the city include the Peel Mansion Museum, Stroud House and Col. Young House.

Also included in the NRHP are historic public structures, such as the Benton County Courthouse, Benton County Jail, Bentonville High School, commercial structures such as the Benton County National Bank, Massey Hotel, Roy's Office Supply Building, and the Terry Block Building, and two cemeteries.

Additionally, a confederate monument installed in 1908 by a local United Daughters of the Confederacy chapter. On June 1, 2020, local residents held a non-violent demonstration at the statue in solidarity with the Black Lives Matter movement, until later that night, when the Benton County Sheriff's "mobile field force" ended the demonstration by deploying tear gas on the assembled crowd and arresting several people. The statue was removed from the square in September 2020 and relocated to the new privately held James H. Berry Park in July 2023.

== Parks and recreation ==
The Bentonville Parks and Recreation Department maintains twenty-two parks and over 50 miles (80 km) of trails.

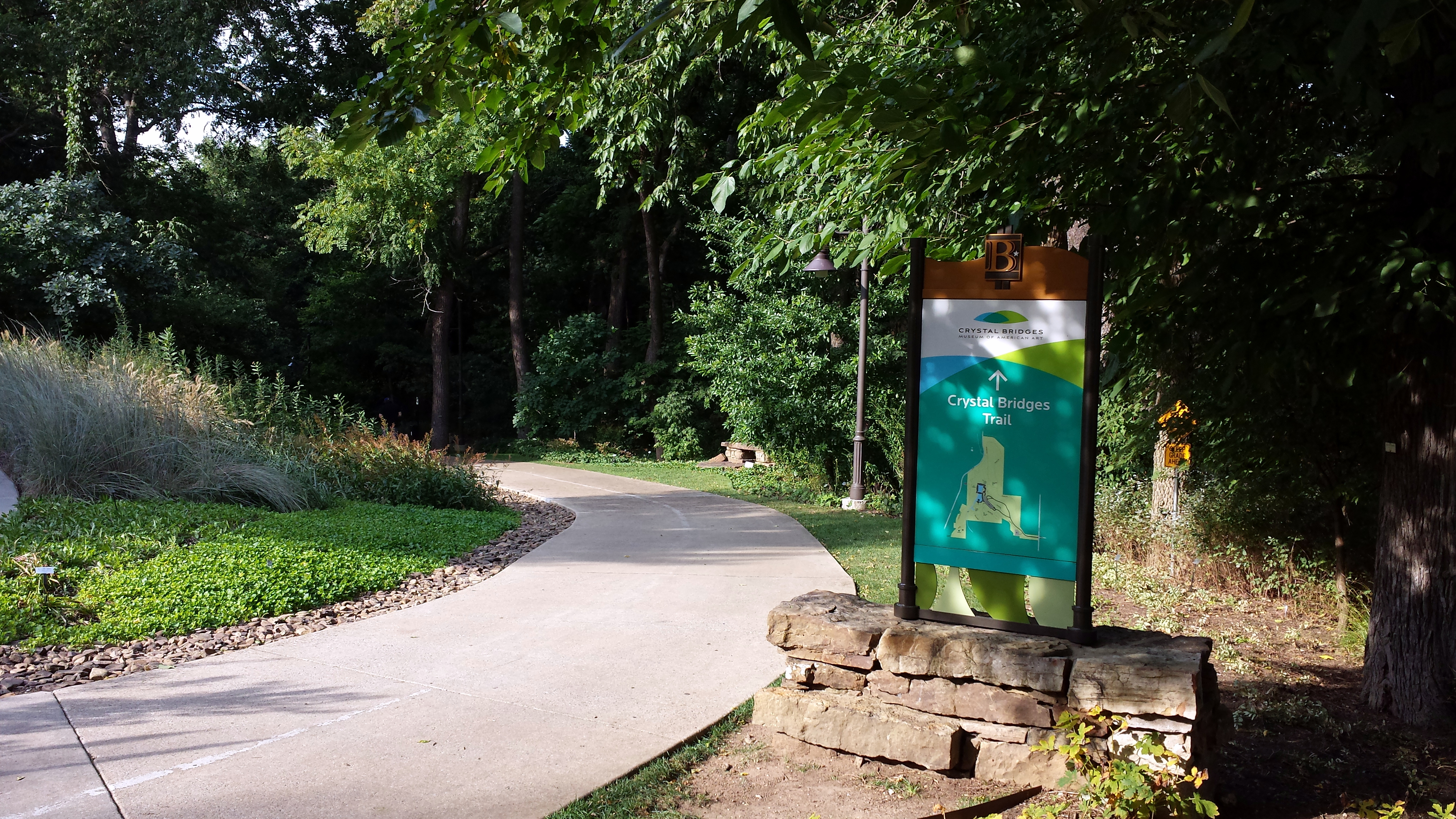
Crystal Bridges Trail crosses through Compton Gardens between downtown and the museum.

Over 300 acres (120 ha) of city parks throughout the city offer educational, recreational and outdoors opportunities to park visitors. The largest park surrounds Lake Bella Vista and includes a popular perimeter fitness trail and disc golf course. Memorial park features the Melvin Ford Aquatic Center as well as baseball, basketball, tennis, volleyball, skateboard, softball and soccer facilities. The four baseball fields at Merchants Baseball Park have hosted the Bentonville Youth Baseball League since its inception in 1954. Park Springs Park was created in the 1890s following the discovery of two springs with purported healing powers. The Burns Arboretum/Nature Trail was added in 1996 and includes a State Champion tree.

Trails in Bentonville vary from small fitness trails to long mountain bike trails to the regional Razorback Greenway depending upon topography, intended use and city planning. The Northwest Arkansas Razorback Regional Greenway, a 36-mile (58 km) primarily off-road mixed use trail connecting the Northwest Arkansas region, runs through Bentonville near Bentonville High School, the Walmart Home Office, and Crystal Bridges on its way to Lake Bella Vista to the north. The Crystal Bridges Trail is a 1 mile (1.6 km) trail between downtown Bentonville and the museum, built by the museum and donated to the city. Public art and sculptures line the trail, which passes through Compton Gardens on its way to the museum's southeast entrance. After passing by an overlook where trail users can view the museum from a bluff, the Crystal Bridges Trail connects to the museum's 3-mile (4.8 km) trail system. The city also has several trails connecting main streets, parks and neighborhoods throughout the city. Bentonville also boasts a cricket league with 18 teams.

Bentonville is a mountain biking destination providing more than 28 miles of mountain bike trails, and hosting multiple cycling events throughout the year, including Big Sugar Gravel, part of the LifeTime Grand Prix Series.

== Government ==
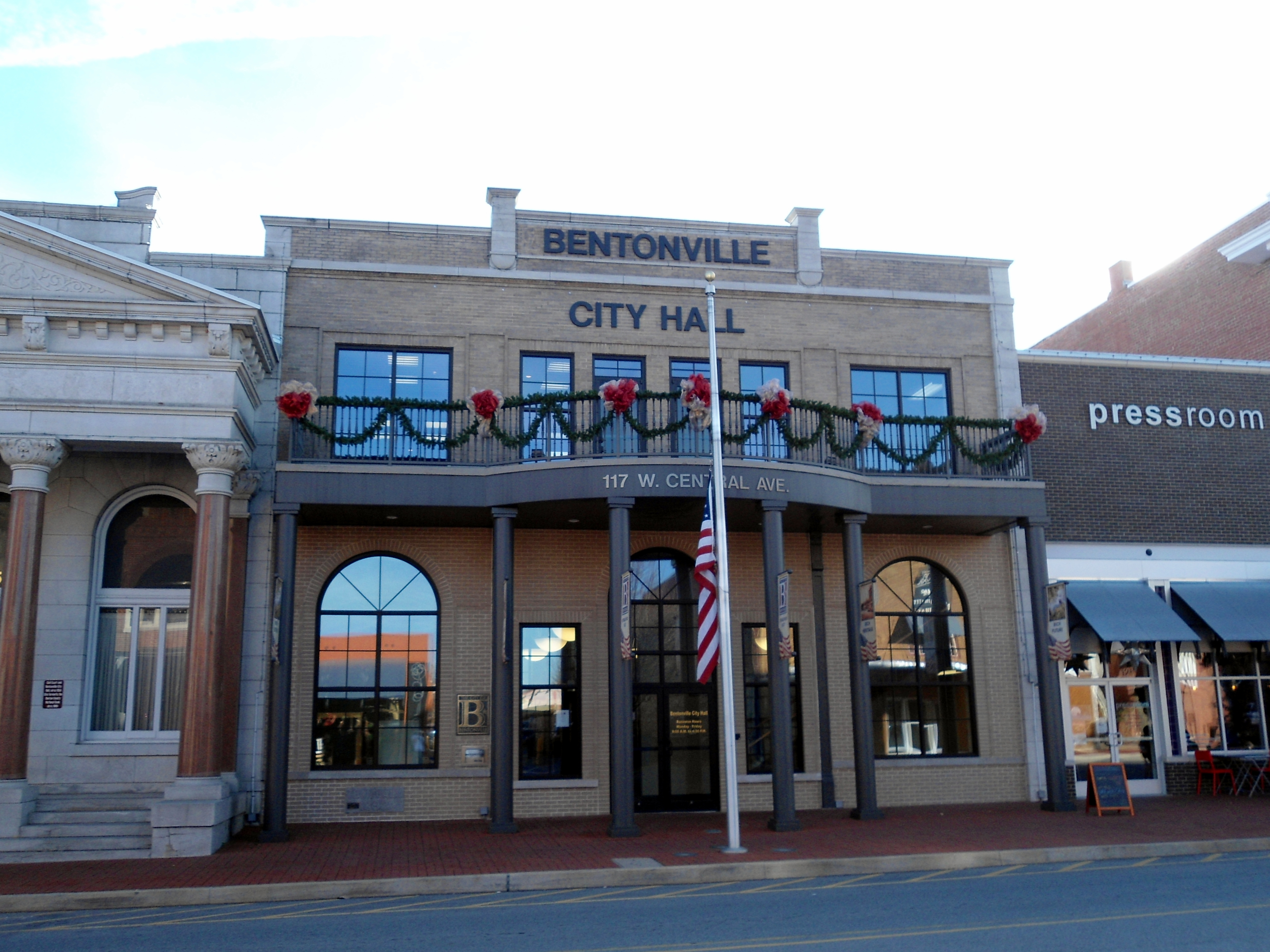
Bentonville City Hall at 117 W. Central

=== Mayor–city council ===
Bentonville operates within the mayor-city council form of government. The mayor is elected by a citywide election to serve as the chief executive officer (CEO) of the city by presiding over all city council meetings, laws are enforced and taxpayer funds are spent prudently. Once elected, the mayor also allocates duties to city employees. Mayors serve four-year terms and can serve unlimited terms.

The city council is the unicameral legislative body of the city, consisting of eight members. The council's duties include balancing the city's budget and passing ordinances. The body also controls the representatives of specialized city commissions underneath their jurisdiction. Members are elected at-large with no term limits and represent individual wards. Council members must live in the ward they represent.

The current mayor is Stephanie Orman, first elected in 2018. Prior to becoming mayor, Orman served as a member of the City Council as well as serving in and leading several non-profit organizations.

=== Citizen boards, commissions, and committees ===
Citizen input is welcomed through the use of various specialized groups. Although some positions are appointed by the mayor, many consist of volunteers. Requirements include the applicant is a resident of Bentonville and submission of an application in order to gain access to any of Bentonville's 8 city boards. These range from appointed positions at the Planning Commission to the Bentonville Public Art Advisory Committee to the Bentonville Library Advisory Board.

=== Judicial system ===
The Bentonville District Court handles criminal, civil, small claims, and traffic matters within the city limits. In addition, the Court handles Civil and Small Claims cases when there is proper jurisdiction. The current elected District Judge presides over all cases. Ray Bunch is the current Bentonville District Court Judge. The 19th Judicial Circuit Court covers Benton County as a whole and operates out of the Benton County Courthouse in Downtown Bentonville with Bentonville serving as the County Seat.

=== Politics ===
Voters in Bentonville tend to lean conservative. The current state representatives that serve districts containing portions of Bentonville are Republican Rep. Jim Dotson, Republican Rep. Rebecca Petty, Republican Rep. Kim Hendren, and Republican Rep. Dan Douglas. The current state senator that serves the district containing Bentonville is Republican Sen. Bart Hester.

== Education ==
Public elementary and secondary education in the majority of the city limits is provided by Bentonville Public Schools, leading to graduation at Bentonville High School or Bentonville West High School.

Small portions of the city to the east are zoned to Rogers Public Schools.

Haas Hall Academy and Founders Classical Academy are the two public charter schools. Thaden School opened in 2017 and is the first independent high school in the city.

Bentonville Adventist School, associated with the Seventh-day Adventist Church, provides education services for kindergarten through eighth grade.

The nearest Catholic high school is Ozark Catholic Academy in Tontitown.

Bentonville is home to the Northwest Arkansas Community College (NWACC), a public two-year college that provides students undergraduate, vocational, career and technical education courses. Bentonville is also home to the Alice L. Walton School of Medicine, founded in 2021. Members of the Walton family announced plans to open a new science, technology and engineering-focused university in May 2025.

The Bentonville Public Library System consists of one central library, located at 405 S. Main Street, which provides residents with access to print books, publications and multimedia content, as well as a satellite location at the Bentonville Community Center in the southwestern section of the city.

== Infrastructure ==
=== Transportation ===
==== Major highways ====
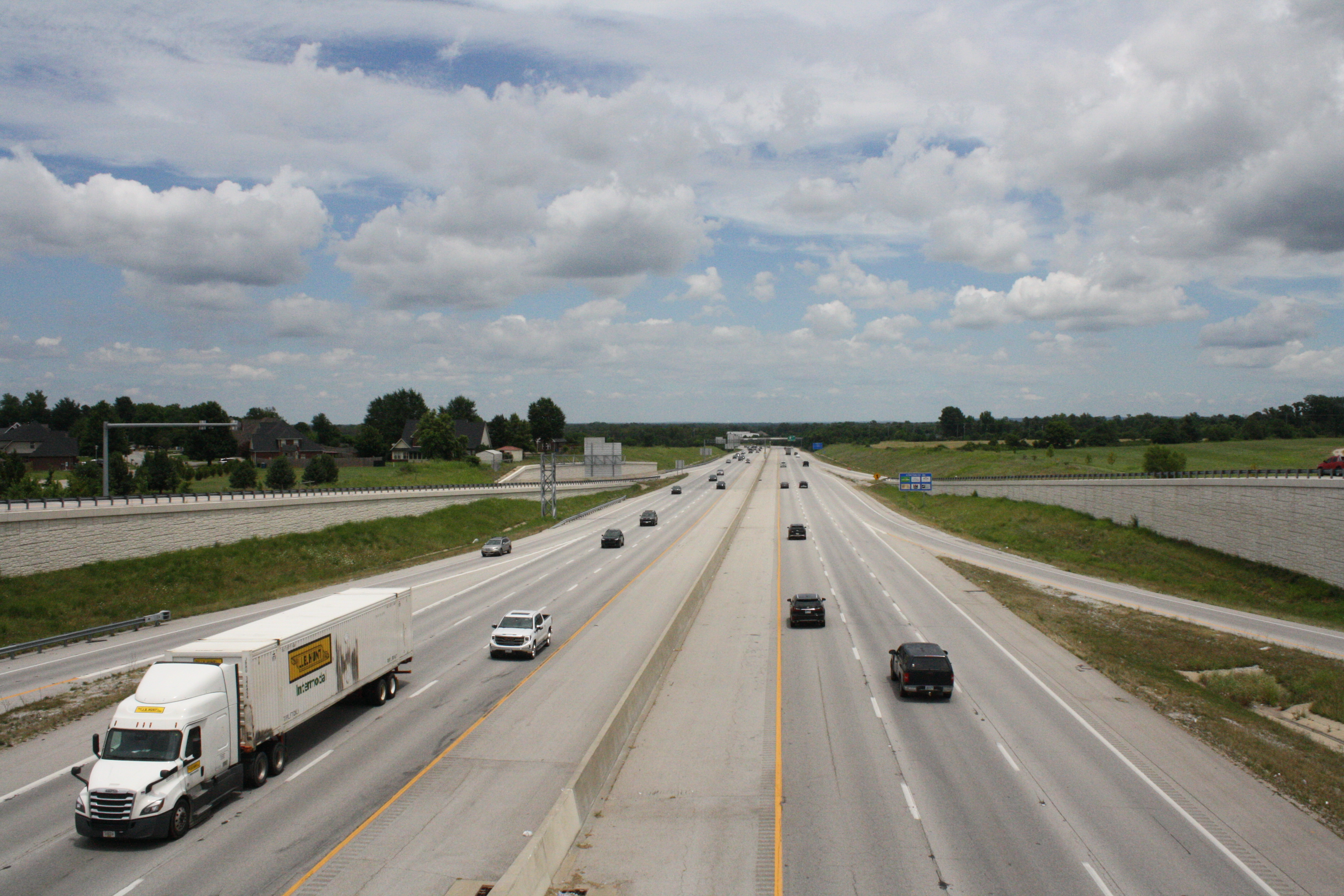
Looking north along I-49 from the 8th Street overpass in Bentonville

- Interstate 49
- US Route 62
- US Route 71
- US Route 71 Business
- Highway 12
- Highway 72
- Highway 102
- Highway 112

The major through route in Bentonville is Interstate 49/US 71. This fully controlled access, four-lane expressway is a discontinuous piece of a route ultimately planned to connect Kansas City, Missouri to New Orleans, Louisiana. Future plans for the I-49 corridor include completion of a freeway segment through between Fort Smith and Texarkana.

==== Public transit ====
Bentonville has one major provider of public transportation, Ozark Regional Transit, which operates in Benton/Washington Counties and is a broad bus-based fixed-route regional transit system.

The nearest intercity bus service is provided by Jefferson Lines in nearby Fayetteville.

==== Aviation ====
The Bentonville Municipal Airport and Louise M. Thaden Field is owned by the city and serves general aviation. The nearest airport for commercial flights is Northwest Arkansas National Airport (XNA), located approximately 12 miles southwest of the city center, which opened in 1998.

=== Utilities ===
==== Water ====
The City of Bentonville owns and operates a municipal water system that provides services to industrial, commercial and residential customers. Drinking water is purchased and pumped from the Beaver Water District treatment plant in Lowell. The city uses approximately 10 million US gallons (38 ML) of water per day on average.

== Notable people ==
- James Henderson Berry, U.S. senator and 14th Governor of Arkansas
- Asa Hutchinson, 46th Governor of Arkansas, 2024 presidential candidate
- Tim Hutchinson, former U.S. Senator
- Doug McMillon, former CEO of Walmart
- Malik Monk, professional basketball player for the Sacramento Kings
- Lee Seamster, Chief Justice of the Arkansas Supreme Court; mayor of Bentonville, 1921–1922
- Louise Thaden, aviation pioneer, and the first woman to win the Bendix Trophy
- Dwight Tosh, Republican member of the Arkansas House of Representatives
- Karri Turner, actress on the adventure/drama television show JAG
- Jim Walton, 17th richest person in the world, youngest son of Sam Walton
- Nathan Kousol, Lao and Thai American singer, dancer, entertainer, K-pop idol, and member of South Korean boy group 1Verse.
