= Col. Young House =

Historic house in Arkansas, United States

- U.S. National Register of Historic Places
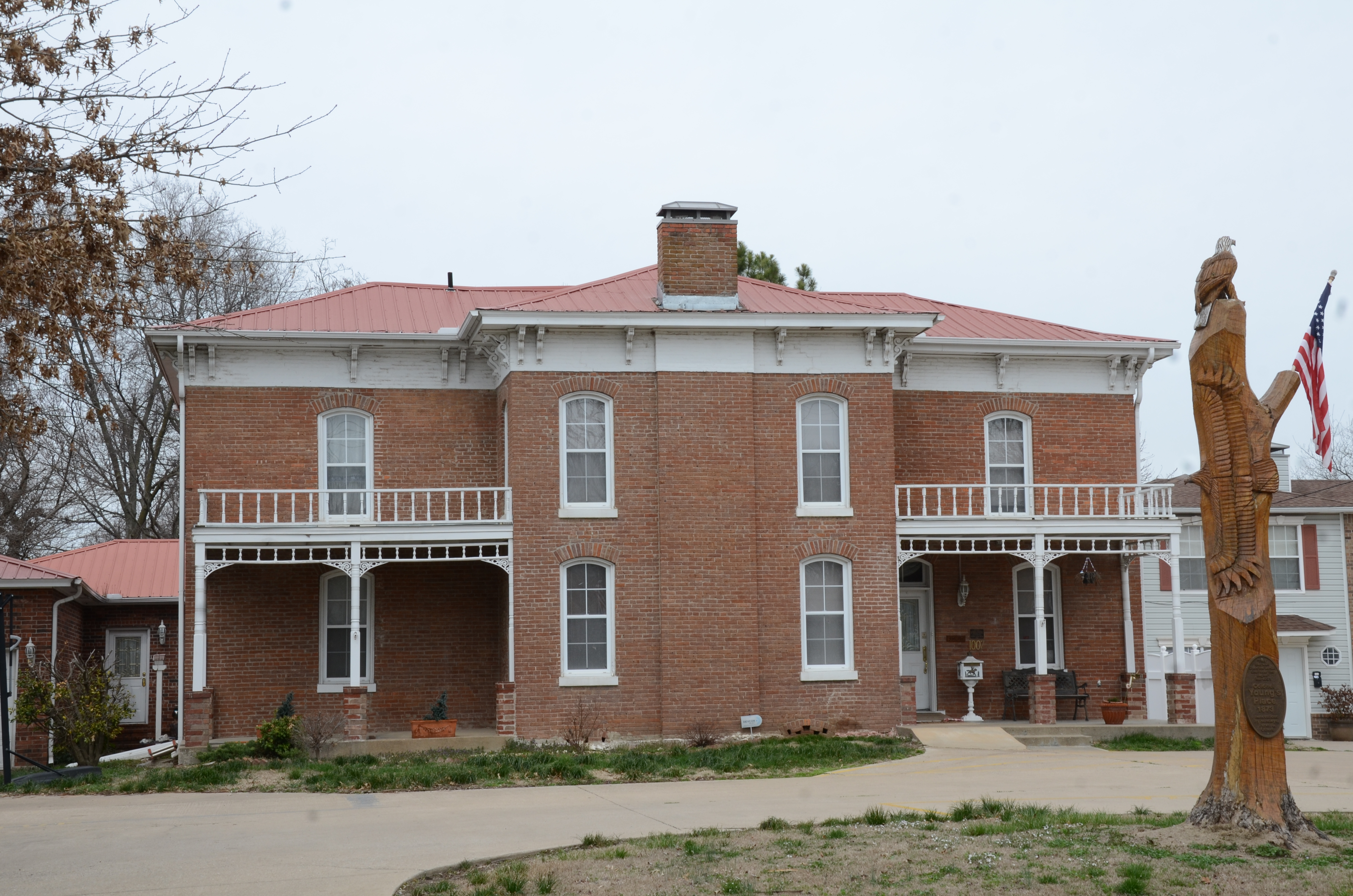

- Location within Arkansas Location within the United States
- Location: 1007 S.E. Fifth St., Bentonville, Arkansas
- Coordinates: 36°22′4″N 94°11′51″W
- Area: less than one acre
- Built: 1873
- Architectural style: Italianate
- MPS: Benton County MRA
- NRHP reference No.: 87002319
- Added to NRHP: January 28, 1988

The Col. Young House is a historic house at 1007 SE Fifth Street in Bentonville, Arkansas. It is a two-story brick structure, with a cruciform plan and a hip roof that ends in a cornice studded with paired brackets. Unlike typical Italianate houses, this one lacks a porch highlighting its main entrance area. This house was built c. 1873, and is one Bentonville's first Italianate houses to be built.

The house was listed on the National Register of Historic Places in 1988.

== See also ==
- National Register of Historic Places listings in Benton County, Arkansas
