= Rice House (Bentonville, Arkansas) =

Historic house in Arkansas, United States

- U.S. National Register of Historic Places
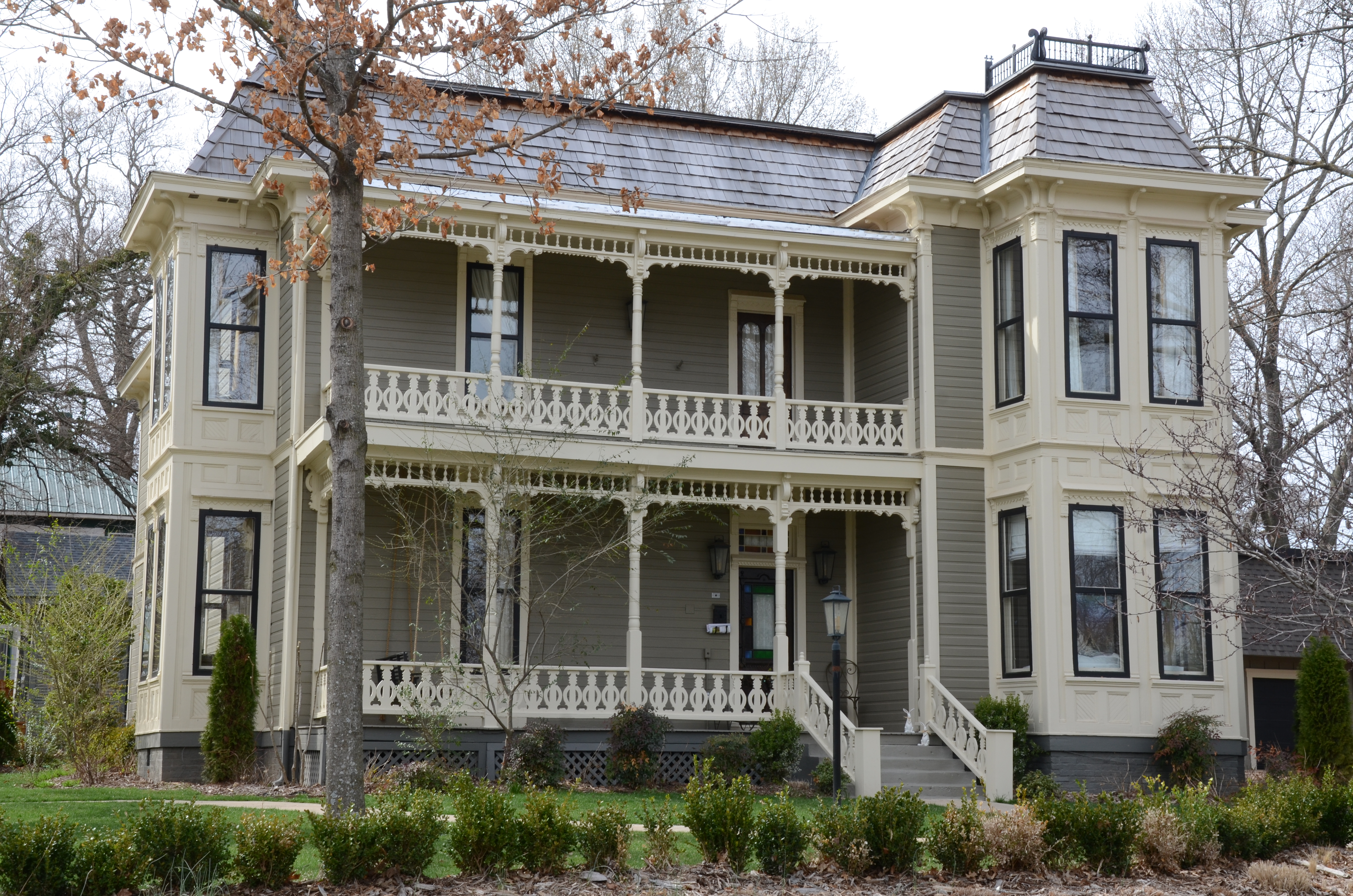

- Location within Arkansas Location within the United States
- Location: 501 N.W. A Street; Bentonville, Arkansas
- Coordinates: 36°22′40″N 94°12′37″W
- Area: less than one acre
- Built: 1890
- Architectural style: Stick/Eastlake
- MPS: Benton County MRA
- NRHP reference No.: 87002325
- Added to NRHP: January 28, 1988

The Rice House is a historic house at 501 NW "A" Street in Bentonville, Arkansas. It is a 2 1/2-story wood-frame structure with elaborate Eastlake (Queen Anne) styling. Characteristics of the style include jigsaw-cut bracketing, spindled balustrades, and molded panels under the windows. At the time of its construction in 1890, it was considered one of Bentonville's grandest houses. The house was listed on the National Register of Historic Places in 1988.

== Construction ==
Once the dream of Charles M. Rice, this home became a reality in 1891 when it was erected. Built to be the family home, Rice spared no expense to make this home a work of art. The floor plan is that of "dog trot" design, being that doors and windows were positioned directly across from each other on all sides of the house. This allowed for natural air flow to cool house in the hot Arkansas summers. Transoms were placed above each interior door, as found in larger buildings of the time, to allow hot air to rise and be moved through rooms and up to second floor, where the hot air would be sucked out in a natural ventilation process. Ornate hand carved wood art, extensive floor, door and window moldings, as well as impressive plaster work was incorporated into the design. Soon into the building process, Rice scaled down the size of the home from its original blue print. This was done to save on costs and provide for the impressive living areas.

== See also ==
- National Register of Historic Places listings in Benton County, Arkansas
