= Scott Family Amazeum =

- Established: 2015
- Location: 1009 Museum Way; Bentonville, Arkansas
- Coordinates: 36.3791°N 94.1973°W
- Type: Children's Museum Science Center
- Visitors: 1,679,254 (2023)
- Executive director: Sam Dean
- Website: www.amazeum.org

The Scott Family Amazeum is a 501(c)(3) nonprofit, interactive children's museum of STEAM (science, technology, engineering, art, and math) based experiences for families located in Bentonville, Arkansas, USA.

== Background ==
=== Name ===
The name "Amazeum" was the result of a brainstorming session, in which children combined the words “Amazing” and “Museum".

=== History ===
Discussions among community leaders of creating a children's museum in Northwest Arkansas began in the early 2000s, with the early group obtaining 501(c)(3) non-profit status in 2006. Fundraising continued during the following years. The official groundbreaking was held in April 2014, and the grand opening of the Amazeum was held in July 2015.

Major fundraising was conducted for nearly a decade prior to the opening of the museum. One of the major contributors to the museum is former Walmart CEO Lee Scott and his family, as well as the Walton Family Foundation among others.

The museum initially expected an annual attendance of 160,000, but welcomed 311,000 visitors in their first full year, and over one million visitors by its fourth anniversary.

== Facility ==
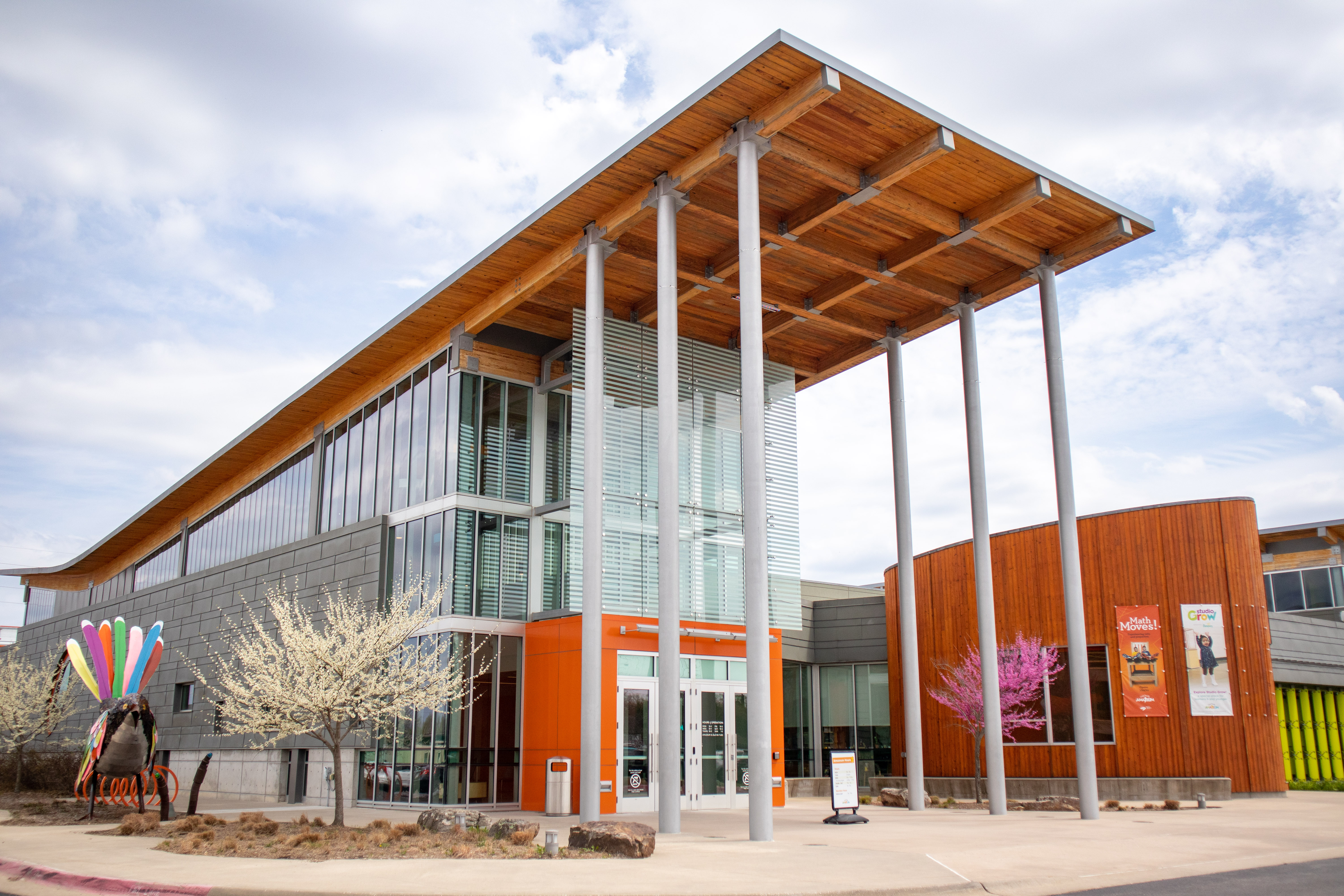
Amazeum building

The 52,000-square-foot entire facility has earned LEED Silver certification and is designed to show how the building is constructed as much as possible, with exposed supports and connections.

The Amazeum grounds feature a number of cycling and pedestrian trails offering direct pedestrian access to Crystal Bridges and the rest of Bentonville.

Awards of note:

- 2016 Regional Excellence Wood Design Award from Building Design+Construction and Woodworks in recognition of its use of natural materials and its integration into the surrounding Ozark environment.
- 2016 Excellence in Hot-Dip Galvanizing Award in Building and Architecture from the American Galvanizers Association
- 2016 Excellence in Construction Award from the Associated Builders and Contractors (ABC) of Arkansas

== Exhibits ==
The museum currently has the following permanent exhibit areas.

- The Neighborhood Market
- Art Studio
- Canopy Climber
- Lift, Load & Haul
- Cloud Theater
- Water Amazements
- Homestead Cabin and Farm
- Cave
- Nickelodeon Play Lab
- Studio Grow
- Emerging Explorers
- Outdoor Playscape

Additionally, there is a rotating exhibit area which refreshes several times a year with new or traveling exhibits.
