= Craig-Bryan House =

Historic house in Arkansas, United States

- U.S. National Register of Historic Places
- U.S. Historic district – Contributing property
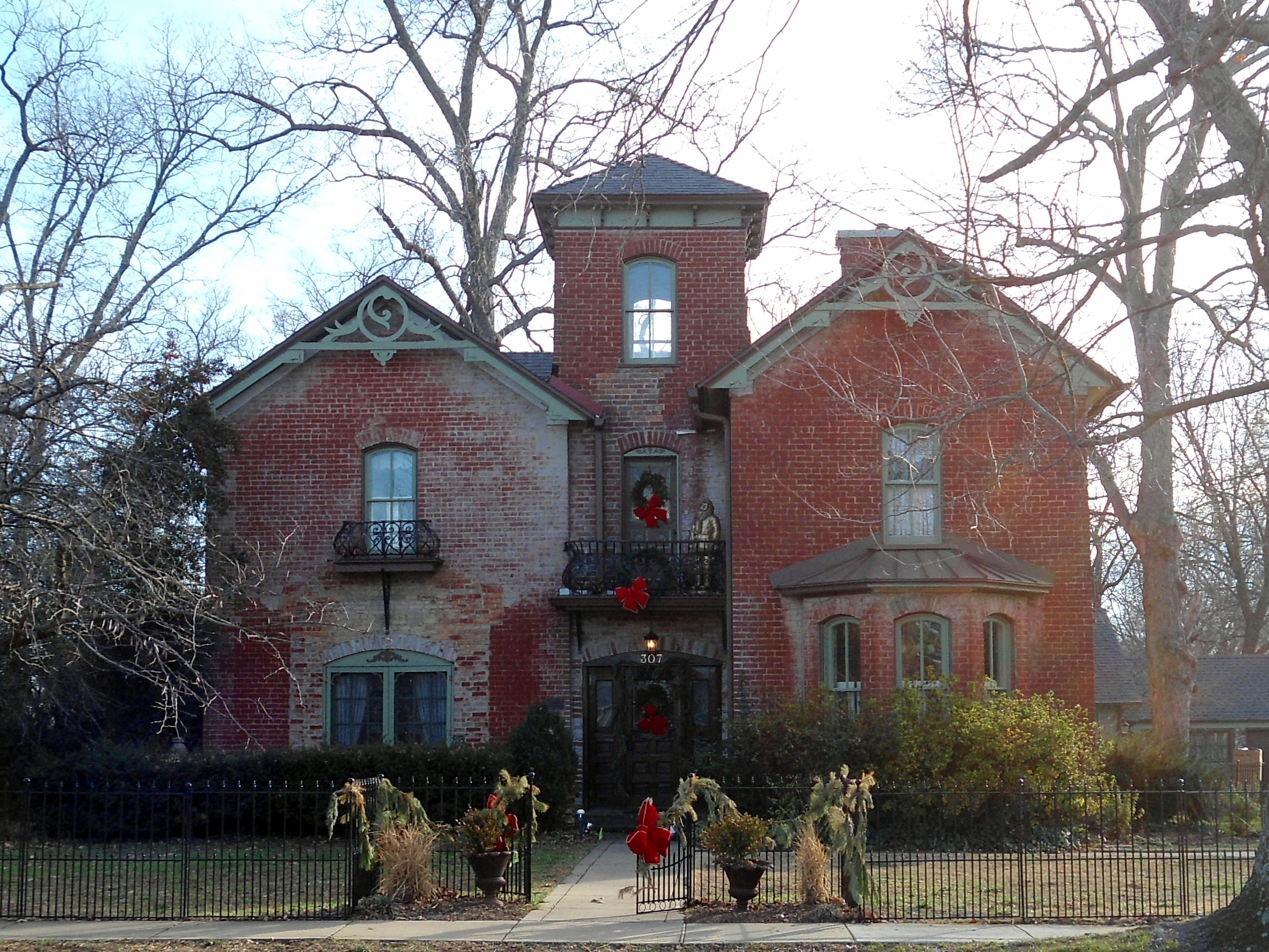

- Location within Arkansas Location within the United States
- Location: 307 W. Central, Bentonville, Arkansas
- Coordinates: 36°22′19″N 94°12′44″W
- Area: less than one acre
- Built: 1875
- Architectural style: Italianate
- Part of: Bentonville West Central Avenue Historic District (ID92001349)
- MPS: Benton County MRA
- NRHP reference No.: 87002320

Significant dates
- Added to NRHP: January 28, 1988
- Designated CP: October 22, 1992

The Craig-Bryan House is a historic house at 307 West Central Avenue in Bentonville, Arkansas. It is an eclectic two-story brick house, with several gabled wings, and projecting bay window sections. Its front-facing gable ends are decorated with bargeboard, and there is a prominent three-story tower at the center with a shallow-pitched hip roof. Its iron balconies were salvaged from the old Benton County Courthouse when it was demolished. The house was built in 1875 by James Terrill Craig, and owned by members of the Bryan family for seven decades.

The house was listed on the National Register of Historic Places in 1988.

== See also ==
- National Register of Historic Places listings in Benton County, Arkansas
