= Bentonville West Central Avenue Historic District =

Historic district in Arkansas, United States

- U.S. National Register of Historic Places
- U.S. Historic district
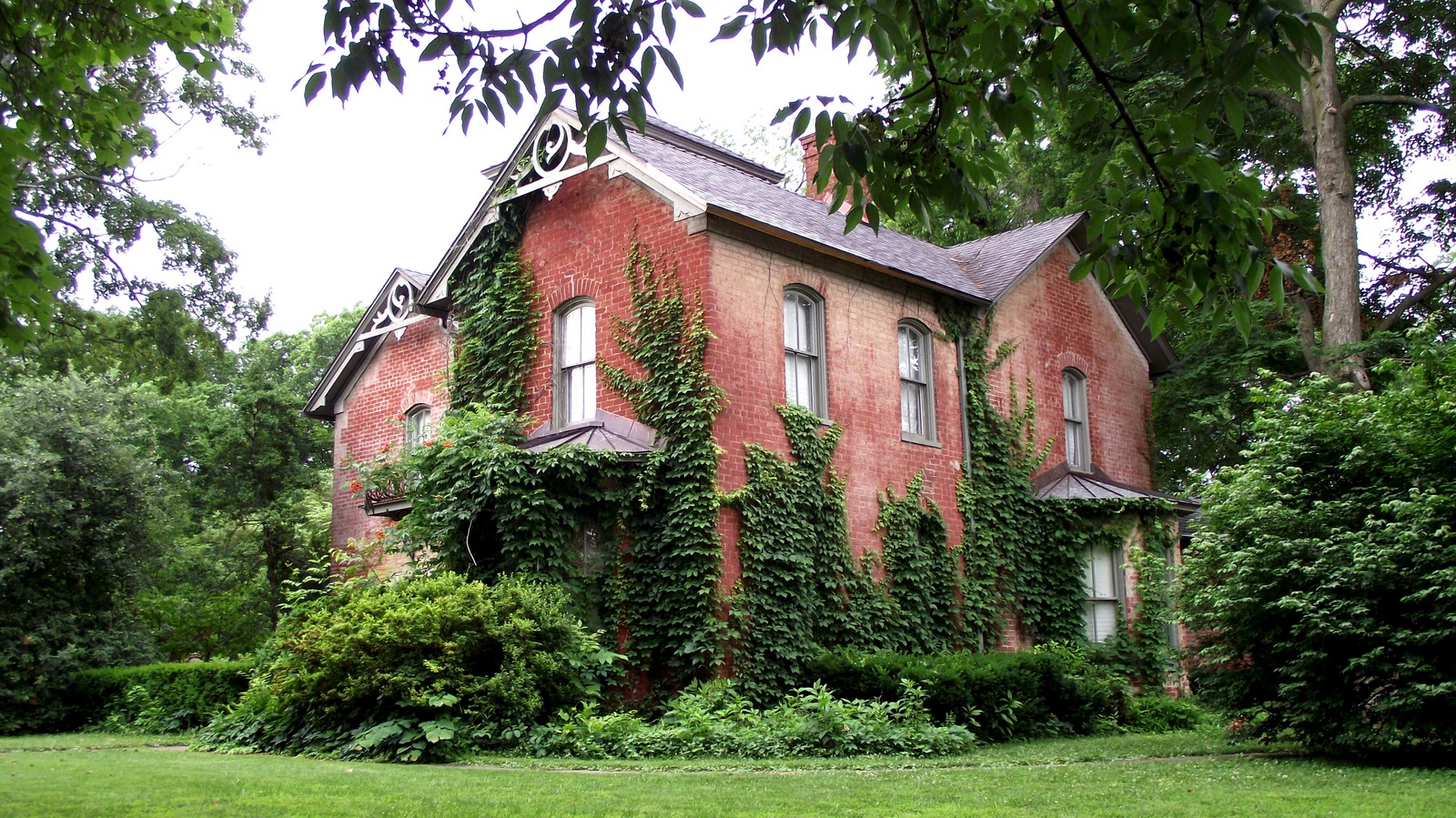

- Location within Arkansas Location within the United States
- Location: W. Central Ave. between SW. A and SW. G Sts., Bentonville, Arkansas
- Area: 16 acres (6.5 ha)
- Architectural style: Late 19th And 20th Century Revivals, Late Victorian, Bungalow/craftsman
- MPS: Benton County MRA
- NRHP reference No.: 92001349
- Added to NRHP: October 22, 1992

The Bentonville West Central Avenue Historic District is a residential historic district west of the center of Bentonville, Arkansas. Located along West Central Avenue between A and G Streets stand forty houses, most of which were built between 1885 and 1935. They represent a concentration of the finest residential architecture of the period in the city. The houses are stylistically diverse, including two Italianate houses and six Craftsman houses. Notable among the former is the Craig-Bryan House, a brick structure that also has Gothic vergeboard decoration.

The district was listed on the National Register of Historic Places in 1992.

== See also ==
- National Register of Historic Places listings in Benton County, Arkansas
