= Downtown Bentonville =

Historic business district of Bentonville, Arkansas

- District
- Intersection of Central Avenue and A Street, with the Terry Block Building (now Spark Cafe) and Walton 5 and 10 (Walmart Museum)

- Location in Arkansas Downtown Bentonville (the United States)
- Coordinates: 36°22′19″N 94°12′25″W

Area
  - District: .65 sq mi (1.7 km^{2})
  - Urban: 21.2 sq mi (55 km^{2})
  - Metro: 3,213.01 sq mi (8,321.7 km^{2})

Population (2000)
  - District: 4,479
- Time zone: UTC-5 (EST)
  - Summer (DST): UTC-4 (EDT)
- Website: http://www.downtownbentonville.org/

Downtown Bentonville is the historic business district of Bentonville, Arkansas. The region is the location of Walmart Home Office; city and county government facilities; and most of Bentonville's tourist attractions for the city and contains many historically and architecturally significant properties. Downtown measures approximately .65 square miles (1.7 km^{2}) and is defined as the region between NE 3rd St to the north, B St to the west, SW 4th St to the south, and NE E Street to the east. Similar to other central business districts in the US, Downtown has recently undergone a transformation that included the construction of new homes and hotels, renovation of historic buildings, and arrival of new residents and businesses. Upon opening of Crystal Bridges Museum of American Art the increased tourist traffic related to the museum has made Downtown Bentonville one of the state's most popular tourism destinations.

== Master plan ==
In the early 2000s, Bentonville adopted a University of Arkansas study that outlined a renovation of the downtown area. Input meetings were held in 2003 with residents and merchants communicating their visions to city administration. Committees selected identified the vision and implementation strategies. In 2004, the Master Plan went into effect. The Master Plan for rehabilitation of Bentonville's downtown includes creating gateways to the district, adding public art, trees, street furniture, parking, and trails while removing overhead utilities and unsightly areas. The plan also suggests maintaining historic architecture and restricting future constructions.

== Crystal Bridges ==
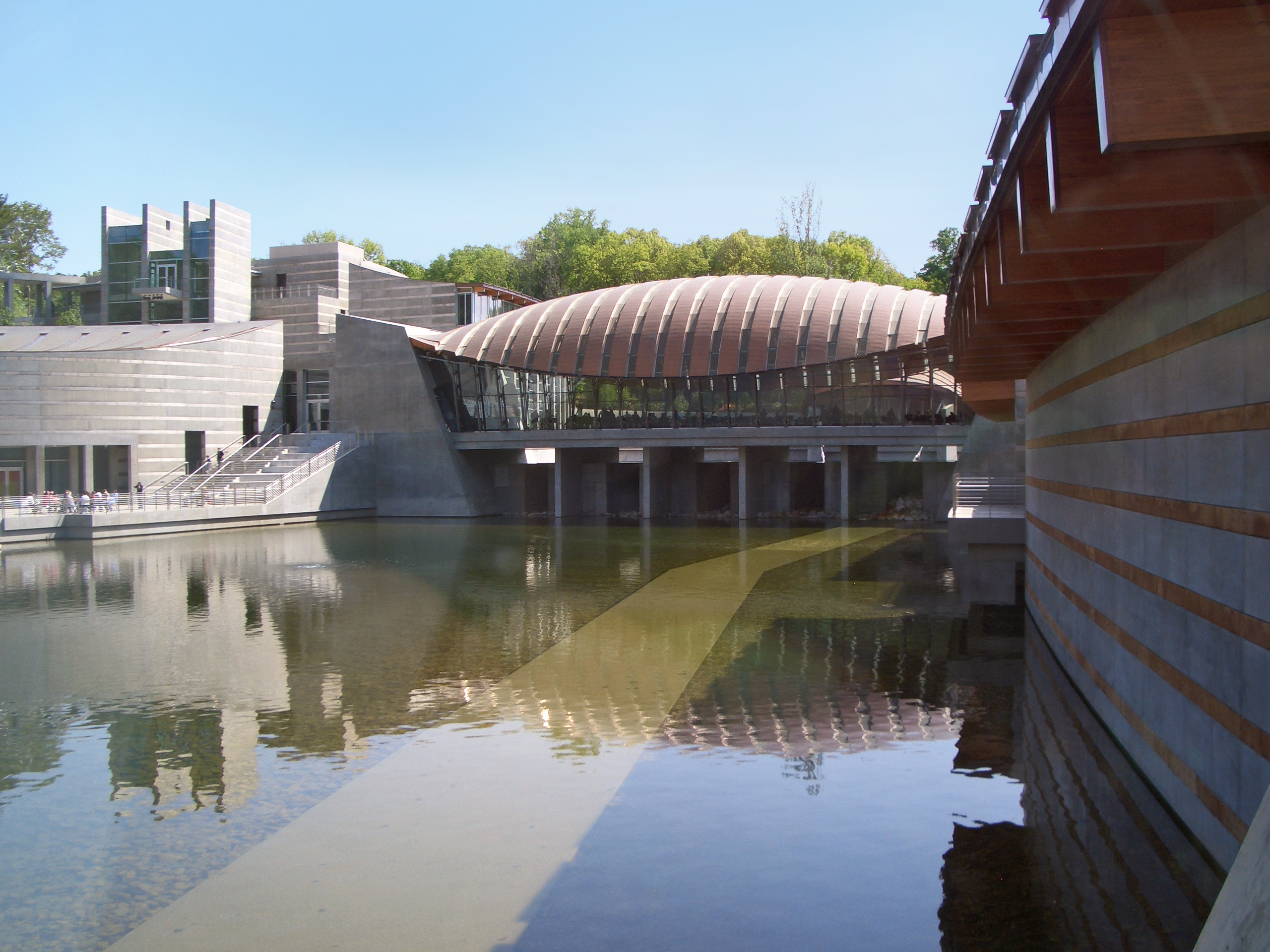
A wing of Crystal Bridges spans Crystal Spring

Alice Walton led the Walton Family Foundation's development of the Crystal Bridges Museum of American Art, a premier museum dedicated to American art and artists. The museum includes walking trails and educational opportunities in addition to displaying over 450 works covering five centuries of American art. The museums is the most popular in the state, with 604,000 visitors in 2012, its first year. The Leadership in Energy and Environmental Design (LEED) building was designed by world-renowned architect Moshe Safdie.

Trails connect Crystal Bridges, which is just outside of downtown, to the Bentonville Square while giving tourists an opportunity to explore the outdoors in the Ozarks. A total of six trails feature educational opportunities to learn about native Arkansas plant life as well as public art.

== Bentonville Square ==
The Bentonville Square (sometimes Public Square) is a town square in Bentonville that includes the several historically and architecturally significant properties surrounding Public Square Park. The Square is anchored by the Benton County Courthouse on the east side and Walmart Visitor Center on the west side.

=== Confederate Soldier Monument ===
The Bentonville Confederate Monument, installed in the center of Square Park, was added to the National Register of Historic Places (NRHP) in 1996. This monument was removed to a privately owned plot of land in 2020.

=== Benton County Courthouse ===
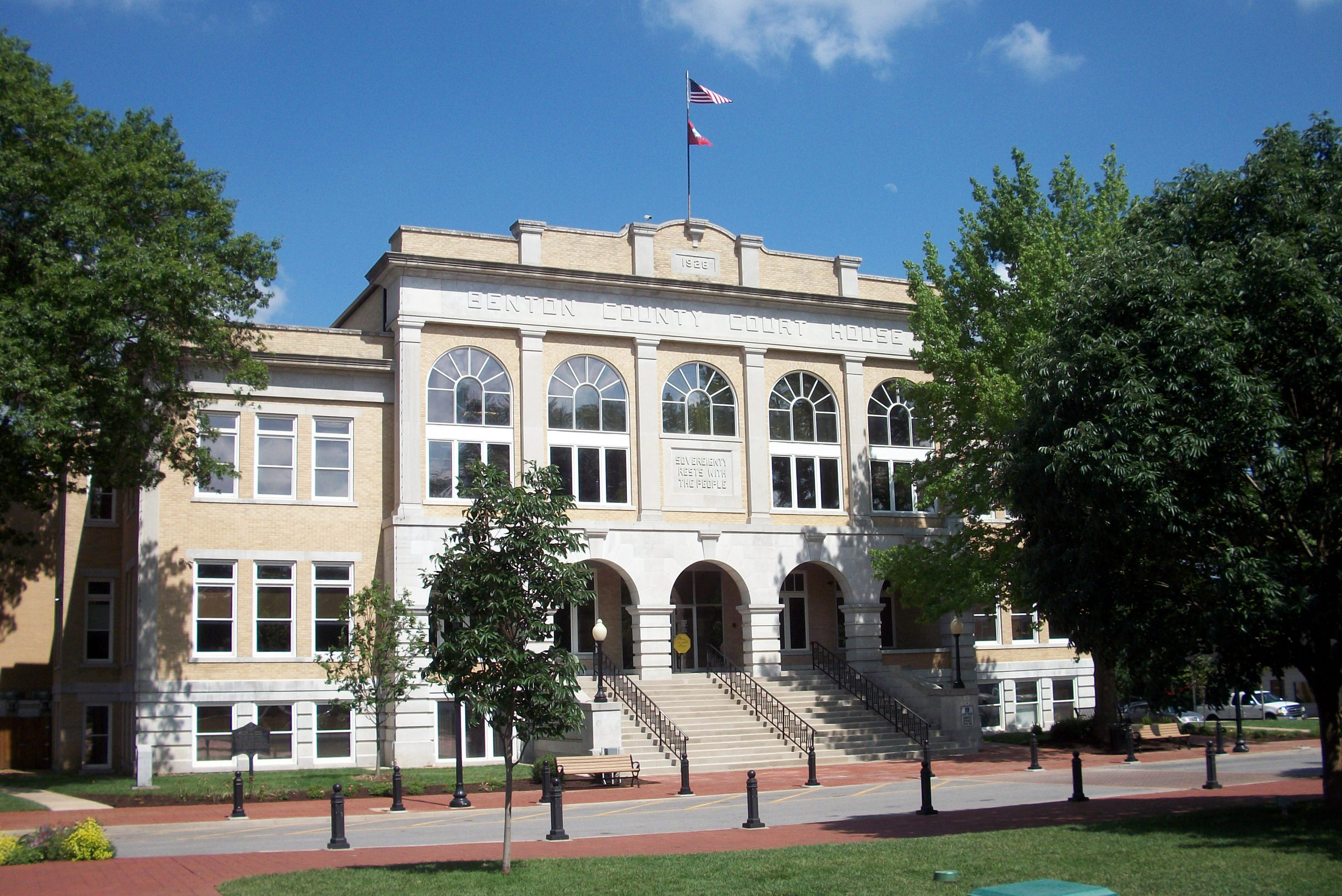
Benton County Courthouse, July 2011

The Benton County Courthouse has been the home of Benton County government since it was built by Albert O. Clark in 1928. The Classical Revival structure features keystones, round-topped windows, and the inscription "Sovereignty rests with the people" in a large concrete block above the main entrance. The structure was added to the NRHP in 1988, along with many other historical structures in Benton County.

=== Bogart Hardware Building and Roy's Office Supply Building ===
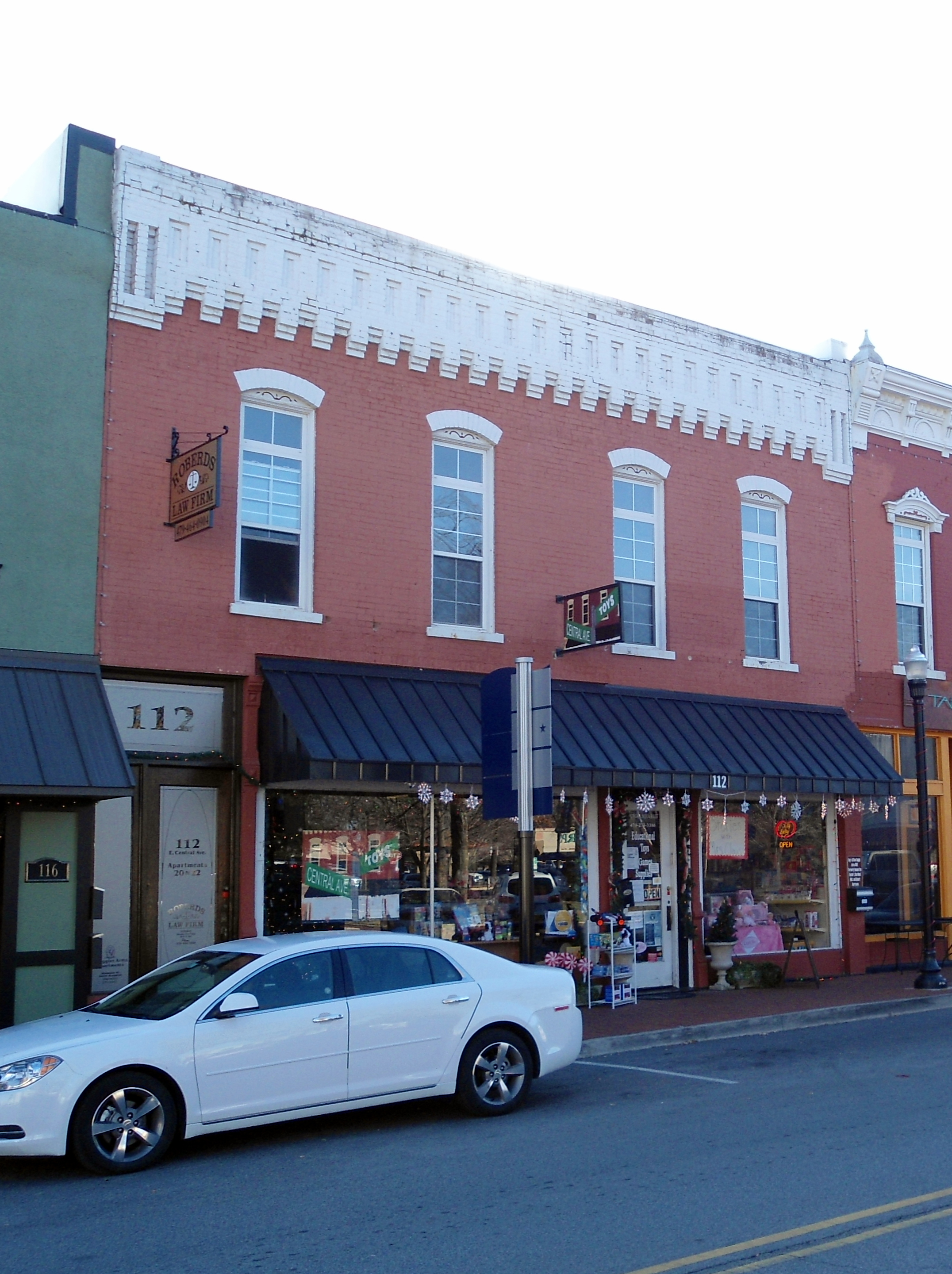
Bogart Hardware Building

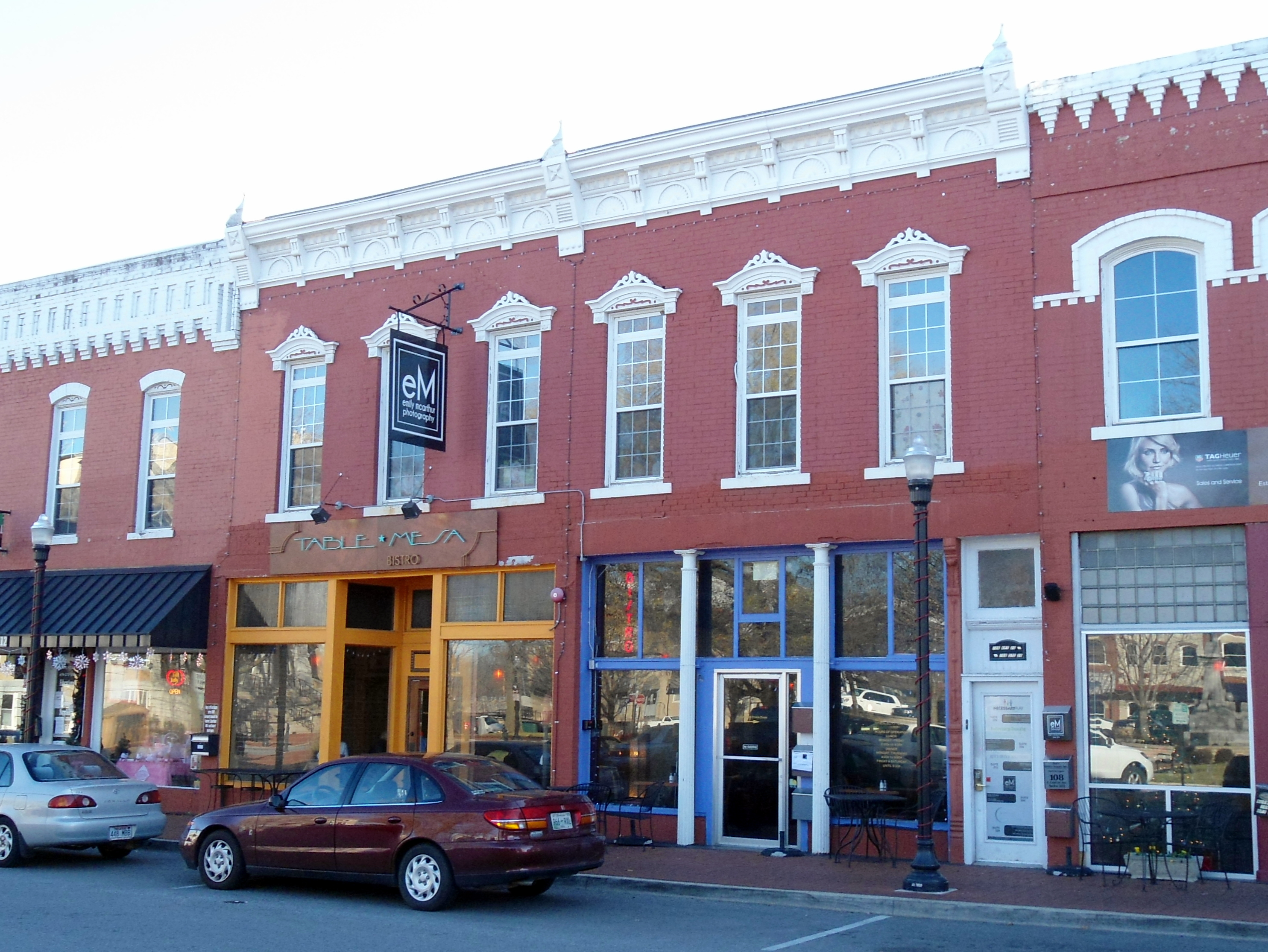
Roy's Office Supply Building

The Bogart Hardware Building (112 E Central) and Roy's Office Supply Building (110 E Central) were built c. 1885 on the south side of the Bentonville square. The original appearances of the buildings has remained intact more than any neighboring structure on the square. The Bogart Hardware Building's original corbelled brick cornice remains in good condition. Roy's Office Supply Building, built with Italianate style, was constructed with two different storefronts in order to accommodate two distinct tenants. Even the original floor remains intact. Together, these two structures have retained the largest amount of original storefront that was typical of the Bentonville square at the turn of the century. Both structures were added to the NRHP in 1988.

=== Hotel Massey ===
Hotel Massey is a former hotel in downtown Bentonville, built in 1910 in the Renaissance Revival architectural style. Occupying an important corner in Bentonville, Hotel Massey replaced the Eagle Hotel, which had stood on the site since 1840. Home to many notable businesses on its first floor, the building is considered an important historic landmark by the community. The hotel's architectural style is also uncommon in Arkansas, and especially the Ozarks. Due to its dual significance, Hotel Massey was listed on the National Register of Historic Places in 1978.

=== Terry Block Building ===
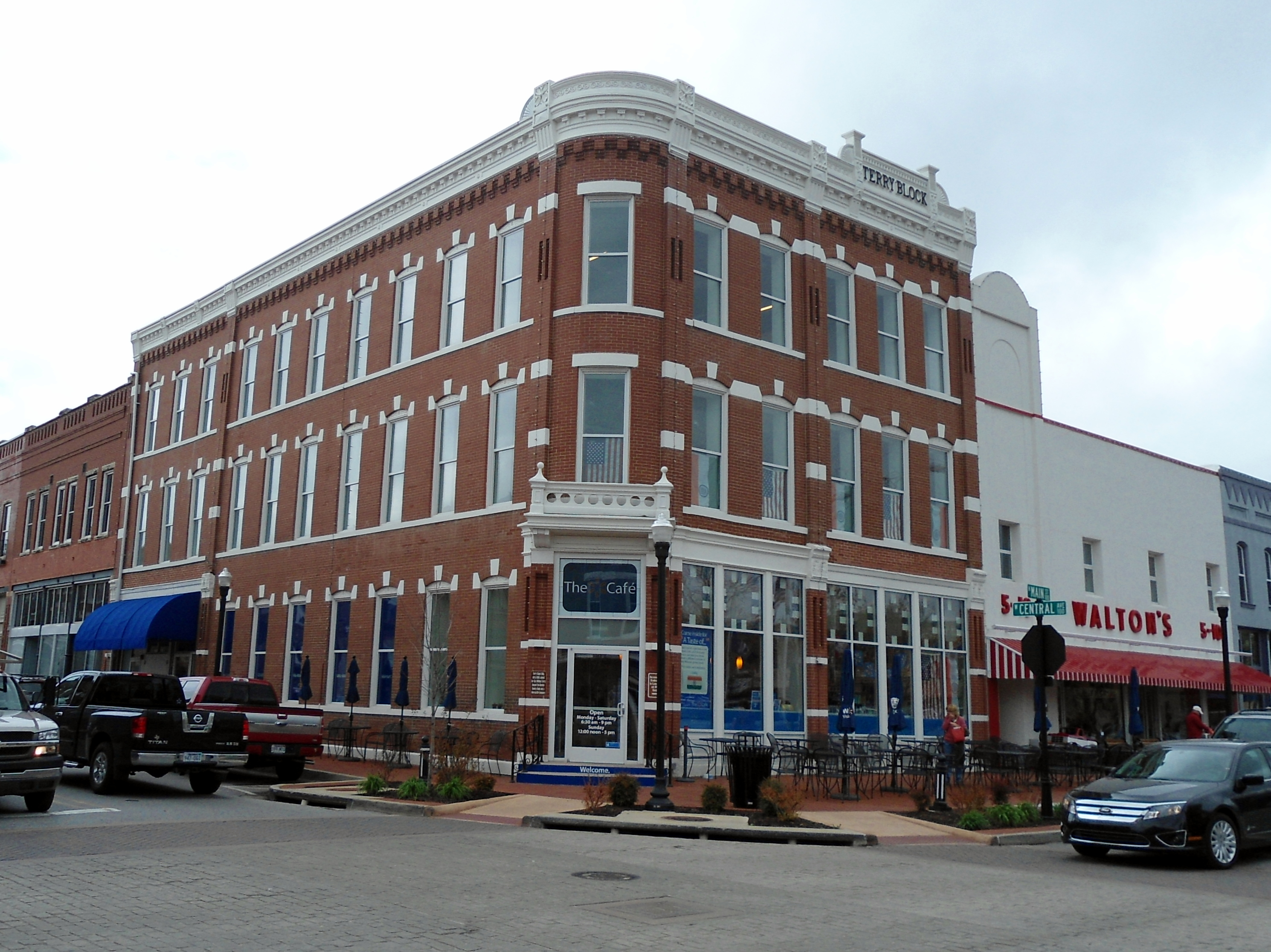
The former Terry Block Building, with original Walton 5 & 10 facade visible on the right

The Terry Block Building was a commercial building on the west side of the Bentonville square built in 1888. Built by Colonel William A. Terry, the building was the largest on the square and communicated a message of the prosperous 1880s economy. Terry owned and operated a dry goods store and was president of the Benton County Bank, also located in the building.

The building was last owned by Walmart and operated as a retro 1950s soda fountain and ice cream parlor, as part of the Walmart Museum. In October 2023, the building was razed as part of a renovation of the museum complex and rebuilt.

== Events ==
Downtown Bentonville plays host to many annual events, including Winter Wonderland in December and Independence Day events in July. Pickin' on the Square, a gathering of local musicians playing country, blues, and bluegrass music, and the Bentonville Farmer's Market both take place weekly between May and October. "First Fridays" takes place April through November include different themed events sponsored by downtown businesses. Beginning in 2015, Bentonville has hosted the Bentonville Film Festival each May.

== Parks ==
Downtown Bentonville currently contains four parks.

- Square Park, 1 acre (0.40 ha)
- Dave Peel Park, formerly the JayCee Park 2 acres (0.81 ha)
- Train Station Park, 1 acre (0.40 ha)
- Town Branch Park, 0.78 acres (0.32 ha)

== See also ==
- National Register of Historic Places listings in Benton County, Arkansas
