= Arkansas Champion Tree Program =

The Arkansas Champion Tree Program is a listing of the largest known specimens of particular tree species in the U.S. state of Arkansas. It is updated every five years by the Arkansas Forestry Commission. The program was modeled on the National Register of Big Trees, started by the American Forests organization in 1940. The goal of Arkansas's program is to record, heighten awareness of, and preserve the largest tree specimens in the state. It uses the same formula for recording tree specimens that was developed by American Forests. Former champions are removed from the list as new, larger, champions are identified and recorded. The program had a total of 130 Champion Trees listed.
