= Museum of Native American History =

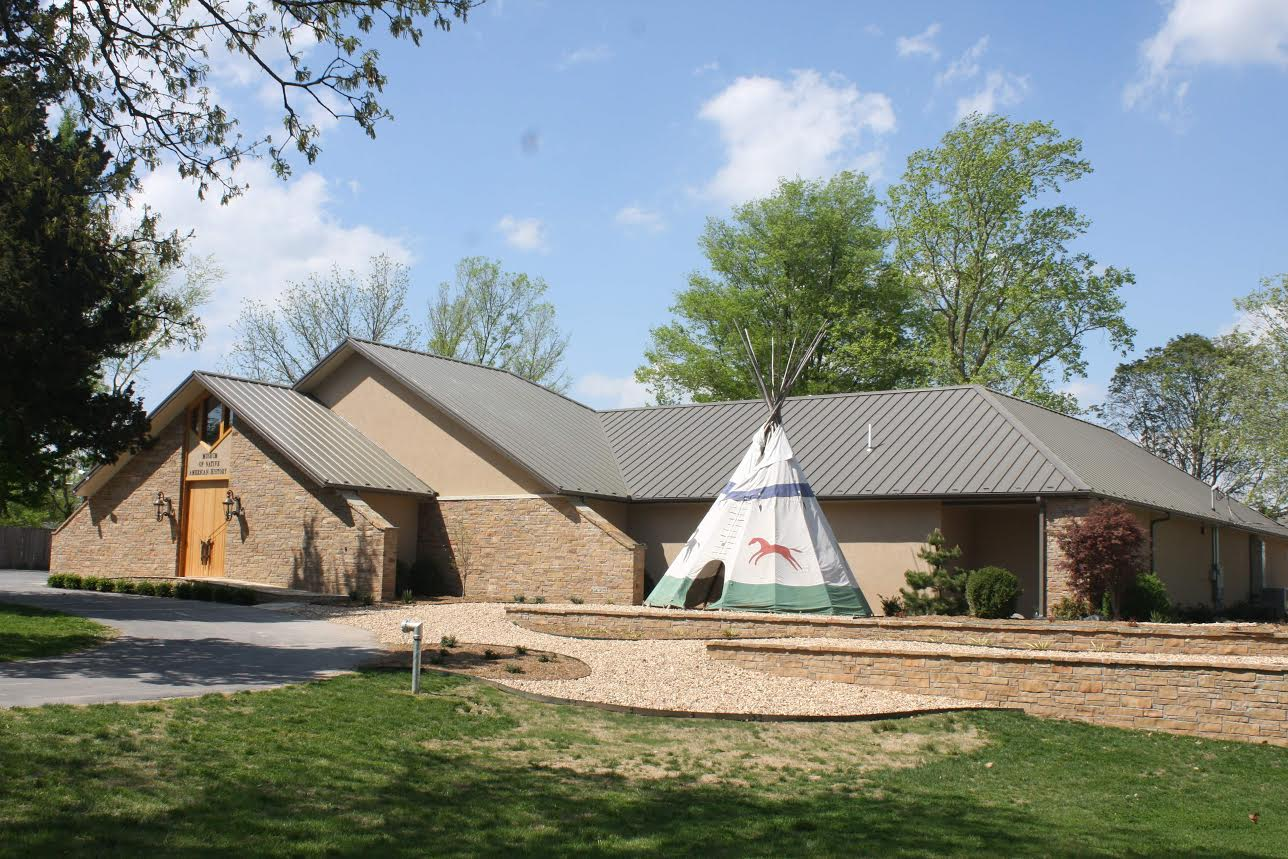
- Established: 2006
- Location: 202 SW 'O' Street; Bentonville, Arkansas
- Coordinates: 36.371475°N 94.231156°W
- Type: Native American museum
- Founder: David Bogle
- Director: Jazlyn Sanderson
- Website: www.monah.org

The Museum of Native American History is a non-profit, handicapped-accessible museum of Native American history, art, and culture located in Bentonville, Arkansas. The museum was founded in 2006 by David Bogle, a local businessman and registered member of the Cherokee Nation.

The Museum of Native American History’s mission is to provide a place where visitors can experience the diverse Indigenous cultures of the Americas through pre-historic and historic art.

The current vision of the museum is, "To advance understanding of human experience within these cultures and provide a space of explorative imagination for all who visit. The galleries are set chronologically; the art and tools Indigenous peoples leave behind continue to speak their stories and history. To better understand their lifestyle, hardships, successes, and inspiration, MONAH invites visitors to open their minds to discover these diverse cultures’ creations. After the self-guided tour ends and the museum store begins, visitors continue to see how Native Americans express their stories through the modern-day arts."

The museum features artifacts from across the Americas covering 24,000 years of history. The museum chooses to focus on the broader history of Native Americans as a whole, rather than any specific tribe, and is laid out in roughly chronological order beginning around 22,000 BC and ending around 1930 AD.

The museum offers free admission and was expected to welcome 34,000 guests in 2022, with indications that attendance will continue to climb in the coming years. The museum is routinely listed as the second most popular attraction in Bentonville, following Crystal Bridges Museum of American Art.

The museum also offers an arrowhead hunt for all ages around the teepee located on the outside grounds of the museum.

== History ==
David Bogle, a registered member of the Cherokee Nation, began his personal collection by purchasing an arrowhead collection from his childhood scoutmaster, and over time his personal collection grew exponentially. He began exploring opportunities to display his collection as well as to educate others in a deeper way about how Native Americans actually lived. That process resulted in the founding of the museum in 2006 in a converted house. The museum also includes items from the University of Arkansas Museum which ceased operations in 2003.

The museum relocated into its current space in June 2008, and it has been expanded 3 times in the last decade to its current footprint of 13,500 square feet to accommodate the growing collection.

The museum collection was further bolstered by an additional 1500 Meso-American items donated by Jim and Nancy Blair in 2015, adding new items from Southern Mexico, Central America and South America.

== Native American Cultural Celebration ==
In the past the museum has hosted an annual Native American Cultural Celebration featuring concerts, workshops, speakers and film screenings. The Fall 2021 celebration hosted over 20,000 visitors online and in person. In 2022, the 5th annual celebration marked the first hybrid event held.

== Private Events ==
Located adjacent to the Museum of Native American History, the facility includes a space available for private events. The venue has a capacity of approximately 100 people and includes a catering kitchen, tables, chairs, and linens for events. The facility also provides on-site parking, including an overflow area capable of accommodating buses. Its parking areas, restrooms, and museum spaces are accessible to visitors with disabilities.

== Field Trips and Group Visits ==
The museum provides Bus Parking for school and group visits with a newly expanded overflow parking area. The parking, restrooms, and museum are all accessible spaces. The museum offers scavenger hunts for groups and a free arrowhead hunt for children.

== Permanent galleries ==
=== Paleo ===
This gallery focuses on the earliest time periods of humans in the Americas, from around 22,000 BC to 8,000 BC. Included as part of the collection is "Tusker", an authentic Woolly Mammoth skeleton from Siberia that greets visitors upon their arrival.

=== Archaic ===
This gallery focuses on the shift toward the time of "Hunters and Gatherers" once the Mega-Fauna had perished and people began living in small semi-permanent villages and gathering food for themselves. This gallery has many examples of Archaic period tools and weapons, including Atl-atl specimens.

=== Woodlands ===
Covering the time from 1,000 BC to 900 AD, The Woodlands period is unique due to the development of crop cultivation and larger social structures, as well as the development of earthen burial and ceremonial mounds.

=== Mississippian ===
The Mississippian Period (lasting from 900 AD to 1450 AD) saw the development of larger villages and population centers. This period's prosperity led to some of the most intricate of all pottery samples that have survived to this day.

This gallery includes the Sweetwater Biface, which is considered to be the thinnest flint artifact yet found.

=== Historic ===
The Historic period (lasting from 1650 AD to 1900 AD) includes the first contact and interactions of Native Americans with Europeans and continues until near present day.

=== Pre-Columbian ===
The Pre-Columbian Gallery shifts a wider focus to artifacts from Mexico, Central America, and South America before the time of Columbus. Specific cultures represented are the Aztec, Maya, and Inca peoples.
