= Albert O. Clark =

American architect (1858–1935)

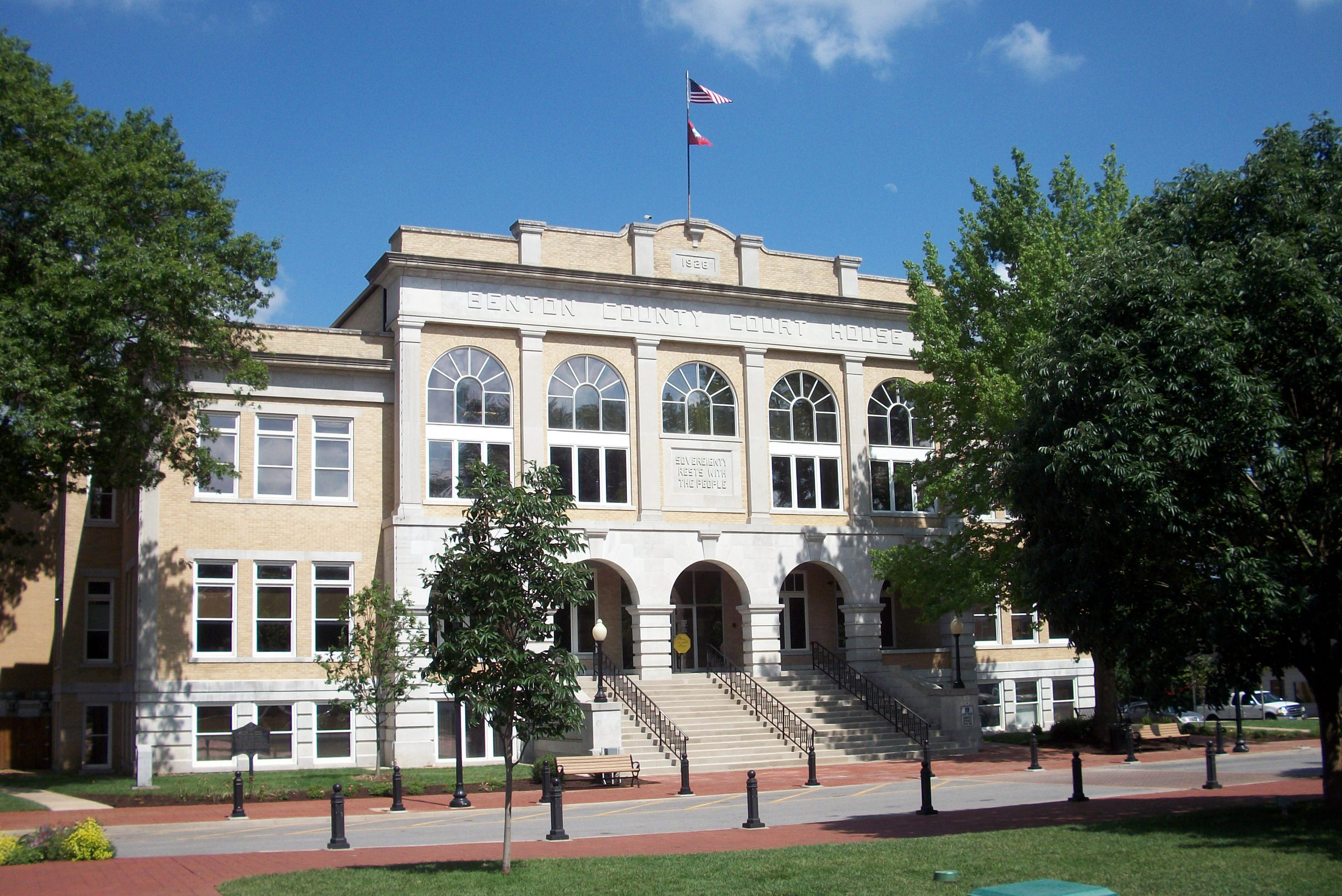
Benton County Courthouse

Albert Oscar Clark (1858–1935), commonly known as A.O. Clark, was an American architect who worked in Arkansas in the early 1900s.

He was born in Medina, New York. He "had established himself as a partner of the firm Mathews and Clark in St. Louis, Missouri, as of 1882, at the relatively young age of twenty-three", and worked there for 23 years in total.

He came from St. Louis, Missouri to Rogers, Arkansas in 1904, to open a second office of the firm, and remained there for the rest of his life. He is mostly known for his designs of "imposing" Benton County public buildings, commercial buildings, and churches, but also designed houses.

He utilized Classic Revival style when designing the Applegate Drugstore (1906) and Bank of Rogers Building. After his work found approval, Clark was hired to build many buildings in Bentonville, Arkansas including the Benton County Jail and the Benton County Courthouse (1928).

A number of his works are listed on the U.S. National Register of Historic Places.

Works include:

- Applegate Drugstore, built 1906, 116 1st St. Rogers, AR (Clark, A.O.), NRHP-listed
- Bank of Rogers Building, 114 S. 1st St. Rogers, AR (Clark, A.O.), NRHP-listed
- Benton County Courthouse, 106 S.E. A St. Bentonville, AR (Clark, A.O.), NRHP-listed
- Benton County Jail, 212 N. Main St. Bentonville, AR (Clark, A.O.), NRHP-listed
- Benton County National Bank, 123 W. Central Bentonville, AR (Clarke, Albert Oscar), NRHP-listed
- First Presbyterian Church, 212 College Ave. Clarksville, AR (Clarke, A.O.), NRHP-listed
- Freeman-Felker House, 318 W. Elm St. Rogers, AR (Clark, A.O.), NRHP-listed
- Charles Juhre House, 406 N. 4th St. Rogers, AR (Clark, A.O.), NRHP-listed
- Raymond Munger Memorial Chapel-University of the Ozarks, W of AR 103, University of the Ozarks campus Clarksville, AR (Clark, A.O.), NRHP-listed
- Mutual Aid Union Building, 2nd and Poplar Sts. Rogers, AR (Clarke, Albert O.), NRHP-listed
- Oklahoma Row Hotel Site, AR 94 Spur at shore of Beaver Lake Monte Ne, AR (Clarke, Albert O.), NRHP-listed
- Old Springdale High School, Johnson St. Springdale, AR (Clark, A. O.), NRHP-listed
- Rogers City Hall, 202 W. Elm St. Rogers, AR (Clark, A.O.), NRHP-listed
- Stroud House, built 1912, 204 S. Third St. Rogers, AR (Clark, A.O.), NRHP-listed
- One or more works in Rogers Commercial Historic District (Boundary Increase), 116 S, Second St. Rogers, AR (Clarke, A.O.), NRHP-listed
- One or more works in Walnut Street Historic District, Walnut St. Rogers, AR (Clark, A.O.), NRHP-listed
