= Benton County Courthouse (Arkansas) =

- U.S. National Register of Historic Places
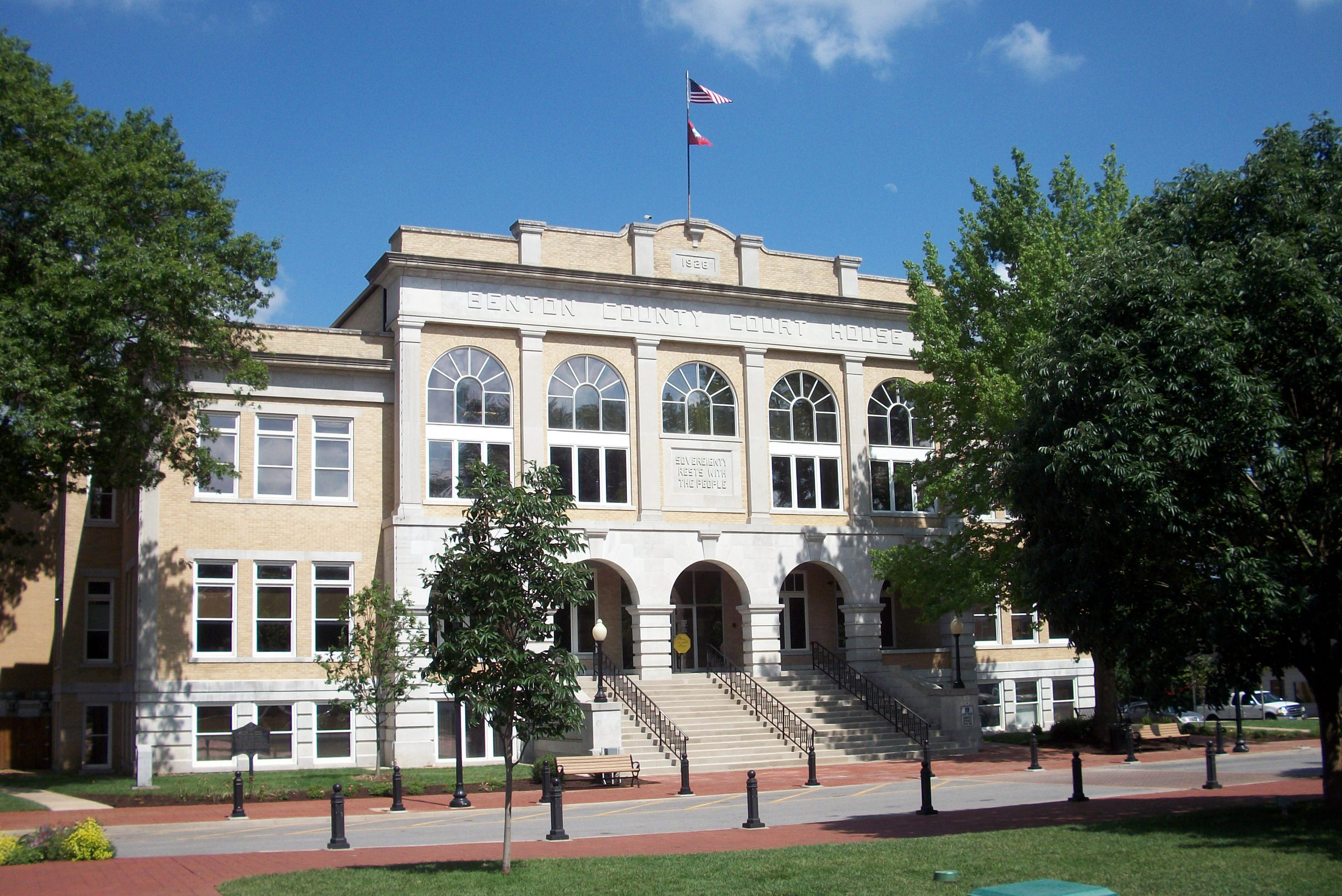
- The Benton County Courthouse anchors the east side of the Bentonville square

- Location within Arkansas Location within the United States
- Interactive map showing the location of Benton County Courthouse
- Location: 106 SE A Street, Bentonville, Arkansas
- Coordinates: 36°22′21″N 94°12′27″W
- Area: less than one acre
- Built: 1928
- Architect: Albert O. Clark
- Architectural style: Classical Revival
- MPS: Benton County MRA
- NRHP reference No.: 87002340
- Added to NRHP: January 28, 1988

The Benton County Courthouse is a courthouse in Bentonville, Arkansas, United States, the county seat of Benton County, built in 1928. It was listed on the National Register of Historic Places in 1988. The courthouse was built in the Classic Revival style by Albert O. Clark and anchors the east side of the Bentonville Town Square.

== History ==
Architect Albert O. Clark came from St. Louis, Missouri to Rogers, Arkansas in 1904. He utilized the Classic Revival style when designing the Applegate Drugstore and Bank of Rogers Building elsewhere in the county. Clark was hired to build many buildings in Bentonville, including the Benton County Jail and the county courthouse. His building replaced an Italianate style structure that had served the county administration needs since 1874. The very first courthouse at Benton was a log building erected in 1837.

== Architecture ==
"Sovereignty rests with the people"

— Inscription in large concrete block above main entrance

Built in the Classic Revival (Neoclassical) style, the Benton County Courthouse features a totally symmetrical façade with a centrally located entrance. The building also exhibits keystones, a main characteristic of Classic Revival architecture. The third floor originally included a balcony; however this was later enclosed to allow for climate control. Today the enclosed third floor windows have round-topped arches, a modification that was in keeping with the Romanesque Revival building style.

== See also ==
- List of county courthouses in Arkansas
- National Register of Historic Places listings in Benton County, Arkansas
