= Former City Hall (Rogers, Arkansas) =

- Rogers City Hall
- U.S. National Register of Historic Places
- U.S. Historic district – Contributing property
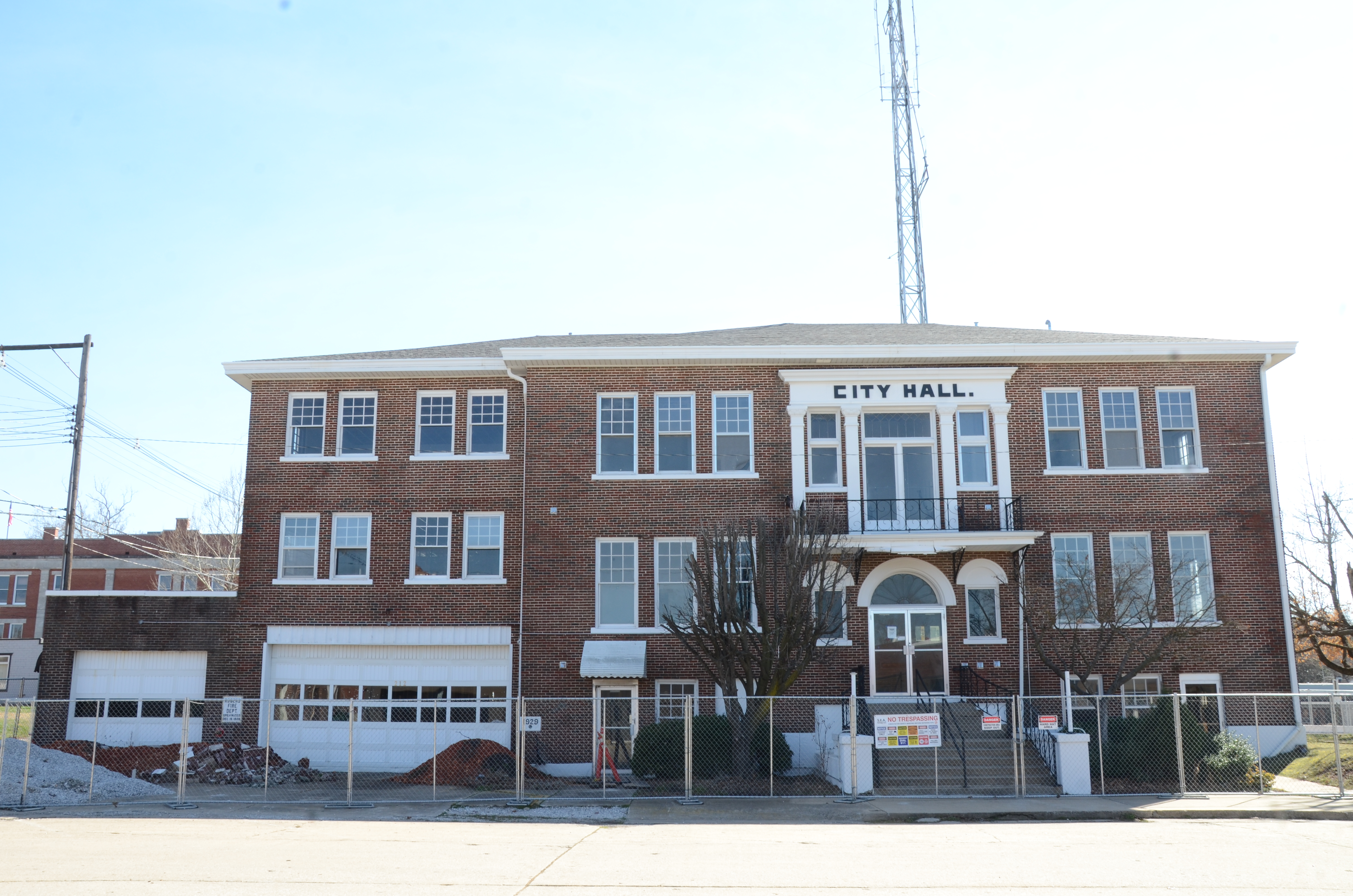

- Location within Arkansas Location within the United States
- Location: 214 W. Elm St., Rogers, Arkansas
- Coordinates: 36°19′55″N 94°7′5″W
- Area: less than one acre
- Built: 1929
- Architect: A. O. Clark
- Architectural style: Colonial Revival, Georgian Revival
- Part of: Rogers Commercial Historic District (3rd boundary increase) (ID12000855)
- MPS: Benton County MRA
- NRHP reference No.: 87002409

Significant dates
- Added to NRHP: January 28, 1988
- Designated CP: October 17, 2012

The Former City Hall of Rogers, Arkansas is located at 214 West Elm Street. It is a three-story brick Colonial Revival building, designed by architect A. O. Clark and built in 1929. The building was used by the city for municipal offices and as a fire station until the 1990s. It is now being converted to residential use.

The building was listed on the National Register of Historic Places in 1988 (as "Rogers City Hall").

== See also ==
- National Register of Historic Places listings in Benton County, Arkansas
