= Stroud's Mercantile =

Defunct American department store

Stroud's Mecantile
- Type: Department store
- Industry: Retail
- Founded: 1884
- Defunct: 1993
- Fate: Closed
- Headquarters: Rogers, Arkansas
- Key people: H.L. Stroud, Alonzo B. Stroud, Harold J. Wardlaw
- Stroud's Mercantile Building
- U.S. Historic district – Contributing property
- Location within Arkansas Location within the United States
- Location: 116 W. Walnut St
- Coordinates: 36.3328°N 94.1168°W
- Built: 1898
- Part of: Rogers Commercial Historic District (ID87002412)
- Designated CP: January 28, 1988

Stroud's Mercantile or Stroud's Department Store was a department store located in Rogers, Arkansas. At the time of its closing in 1993, Stroud's was the oldest continuously operated privately owned retail business in the state. Its 1899 storefront at 114-116 West Walnut is a contributing property to the Rogers Commercial Historic District on the National Register of Historic Places. Two homes owned by Stroud family members; the Stroud House originally in Rogers, but later moved to Pea Ridge, Arkansas, and the Stroud House in Bentonville, Arkansas are individually listed.

== History ==
The first retail business owned by the Stroud family was a store in Pea Ridge, which was co-owned by Allen Bryant Stroud (1831-1914) and his son Harlan Lafayette (H.L.) Stroud (1858-1950). That business was established prior to 1879 and Allen Stroud also served as postmaster at Pea Ridge for a time. In 1884, H.L. Stroud sold his interest in the Stroud store in Pea Ridge and purchased a dry goods store at the corner of First and Walnut Streets in Rogers. In 1887 he brought in his brother Alonzo Bryant Stroud (1868-1952) to serve as manager of his new business. In 1891 H.L. Stroud moved his business into a storefront on the north side of the 100 block of Walnut Street. Stroud's continued to prosper, and in 1899 H.L. built the brick building at 114-116 West Walnut Street, where Stroud's would remain for the next 94 years.

Once Stroud's Mercantile had been established as a mainstay in Rogers, H.L. Stroud left his brother, and now co-owner, Alonzo Stroud in charge of the business and moved with his family first to St. Louis, Missouri and later to Kansas City, Missouri. Alonzo would go on to manage the store until retiring in 1949, at which time the Stroud family sold the business to Harold J. Wardlaw (1907-1984) and a group of investors. Wardlaw first started working at Stroud's while he was a Rogers High School senior in the 1920s.

Stroud's continued to be the leading retail business in Rogers up into the 1960s, when in 1962 Sam Walton opened the first location of what would become the retail giant Walmart just seven blocks away. Walton's new store combined with the nationwide movement of retail centers from aged downtowns to malls and shopping centers slowly eroded Stroud's customer base, leading the locally beloved retailer to permanently close in 1993 after 109 years in business.

== Progressive Retailer ==
Though by the time Stroud's closed in 1993 it was hardly considered progressive, in the early years of the business it had proved to be forward thinking, especially under the management of Alonzo Stroud. Among these innovations, Stroud's was the first retailer in northwest Arkansas to hire female sales clerks, including Betty Blake, who would go on to marry the humorist Will Rogers. Alonzo Stroud also banned smoking in the store, paid all bills on the day they arrived and marked all merchandise with price tags, eliminating the previous practice of haggling over prices.
