= Stroud House =

Stroud House may refer to:

- Stroud House (Bentonville, Arkansas), listed on the NRHP in Arkansas
- Stroud House (Rogers, Arkansas), listed on the NRHP in Arkansas
- James W. Stroud House, Stroud, Oklahoma, listed on the NRHP in Oklahoma
- Stroud Mansion, Stroudsburg, Pennsylvania, listed on the NRHP in Pennsylvania
- Stroud House (Stroud, New South Wales), Stroud, New South Wales listed on the State Heritage Register
