= List of lakes of Benton County, Arkansas =

There are at least 20 named lakes and reservoirs in Benton County, Arkansas.

== Lakes ==
According to the United States Geological Survey, there are no named lakes in Benton County.

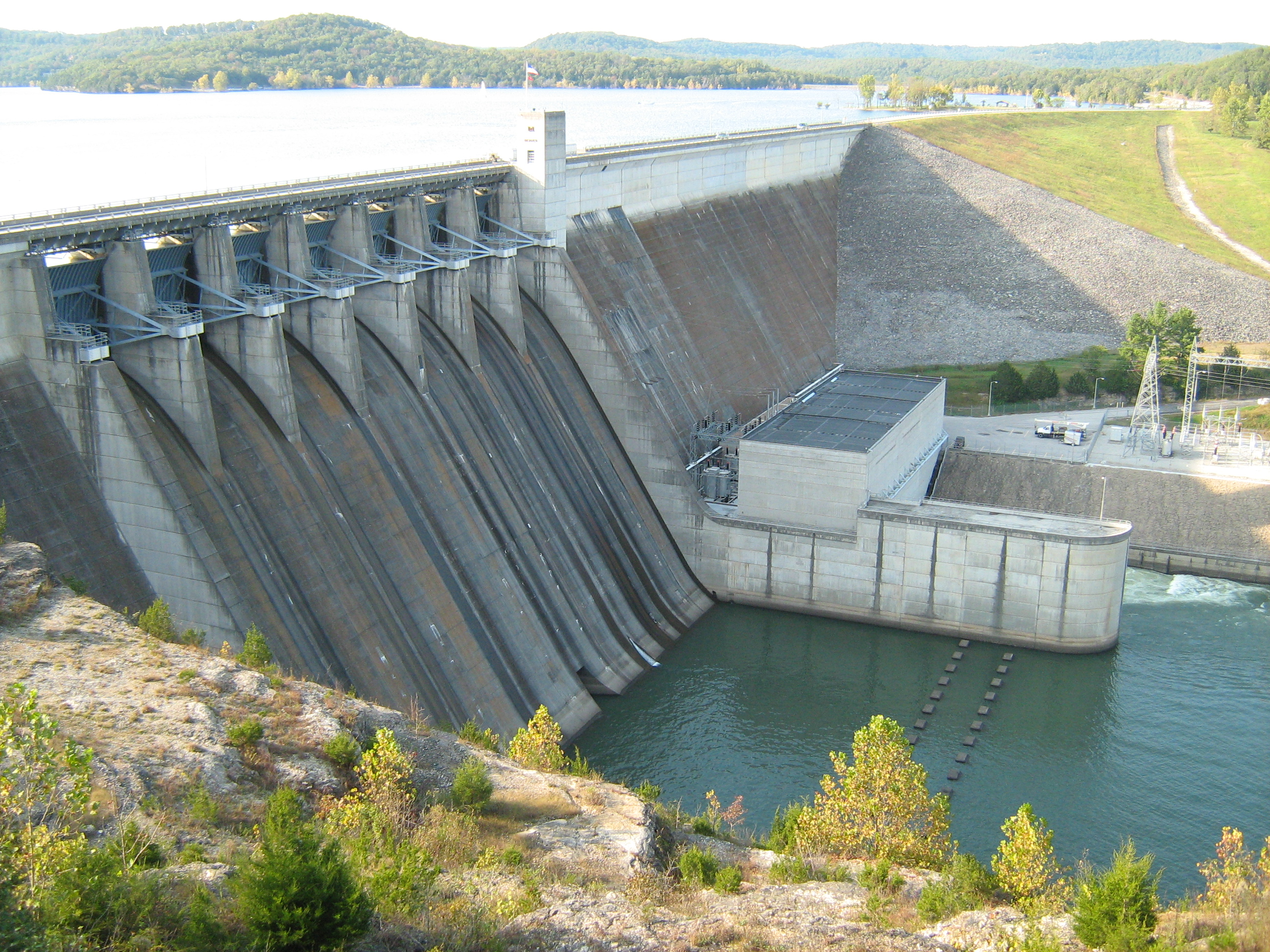
Beaver Dam impounds the White River, creating Beaver Lake.

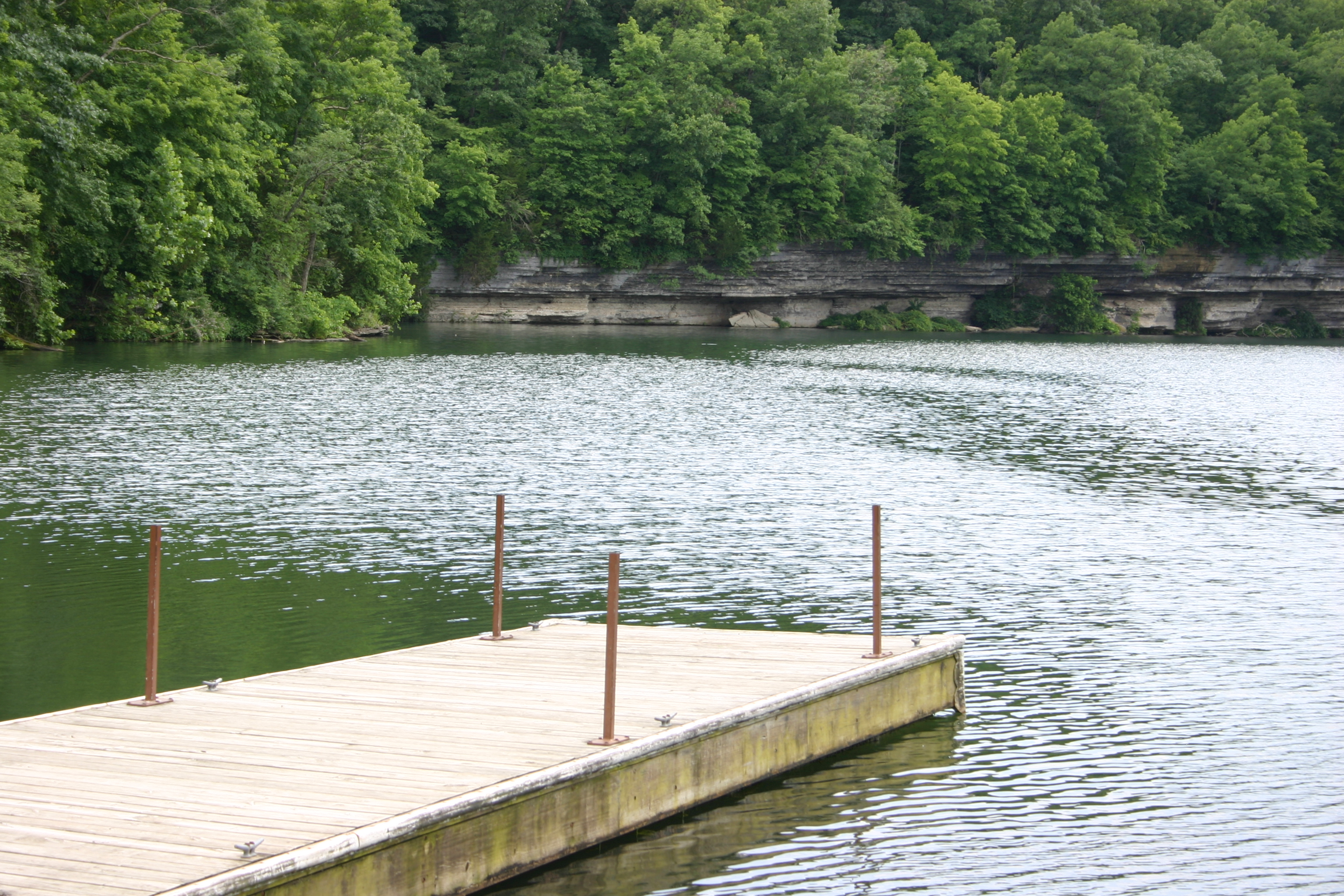
Lake Ann is a private reservoir in Bella Vista.

== Reservoirs ==
- Beaver Lake, 36°14′08″N 093°56′34″W, el. 1,122 feet (342 m)
- Bella Vista Lake, 36°26′00″N 094°13′25″W, el. 1,142 feet (348 m)
- Crystal Lake, 36°20′25″N 094°26′21″W, el. 1,165 feet (355 m)
- Guerrero Lake Number One, 36°17′53″N 094°29′53″W, el. 1,220 feet (370 m)
- Guerrero Lake Number Three, 36°18′30″N 094°29′14″W, el. 1,191 feet (363 m)
- Gurrero Lake Number Two, 36°18′07″N 094°29′40″W, el. 1,188 feet (362 m)
- Jackson Lake, 36°22′18″N 094°14′25″W, el. 1,211 feet (369 m)
- Lake Ann, 36°28′24″N 094°13′31″W, el. 1,053 feet (321 m)
- Lake Atalanta, 36°20′16″N 094°05′54″W, el. 1,214 feet (370 m)
- Lake Avalon, 36°28′24″N 094°15′43″W, el. 1,066 feet (325 m)
- Lake Bentonville, 36°21′07″N 094°13′10″W, el. 1,276 feet (389 m)
- Lake Brittany, 36°28′03″N 094°12′04″W, el. 1,201 feet (366 m)
- Lake Flint Creek, 36°15′05″N 094°32′03″W, el. 1,135 feet (346 m)
- Lake Frances, 36°07′48″N 094°33′53″W, el. 906 feet (276 m)
- Lake Keith, 36°15′42″N 094°14′01″W, el. 1,135 feet (346 m)
- Lake Norwood, 36°28′36″N 094°14′55″W, el. 1,007 feet (307 m)
- Lake Rayburn, 36°27′36″N 094°14′49″W, el. 994 feet (303 m)
- Lake Windsor, 36°28′12″N 094°15′31″W, el. 1,070 feet (330 m)
- Siloam Springs Lake, 36°13′29″N 094°32′19″W, el. 1,043 feet (318 m)
- Upper Pond, 36°21′00″N 094°17′43″W, el. 1,270 feet (390 m)

== See also ==
- List of lakes in Arkansas
