= Old Springdale High School =

- U.S. National Register of Historic Places
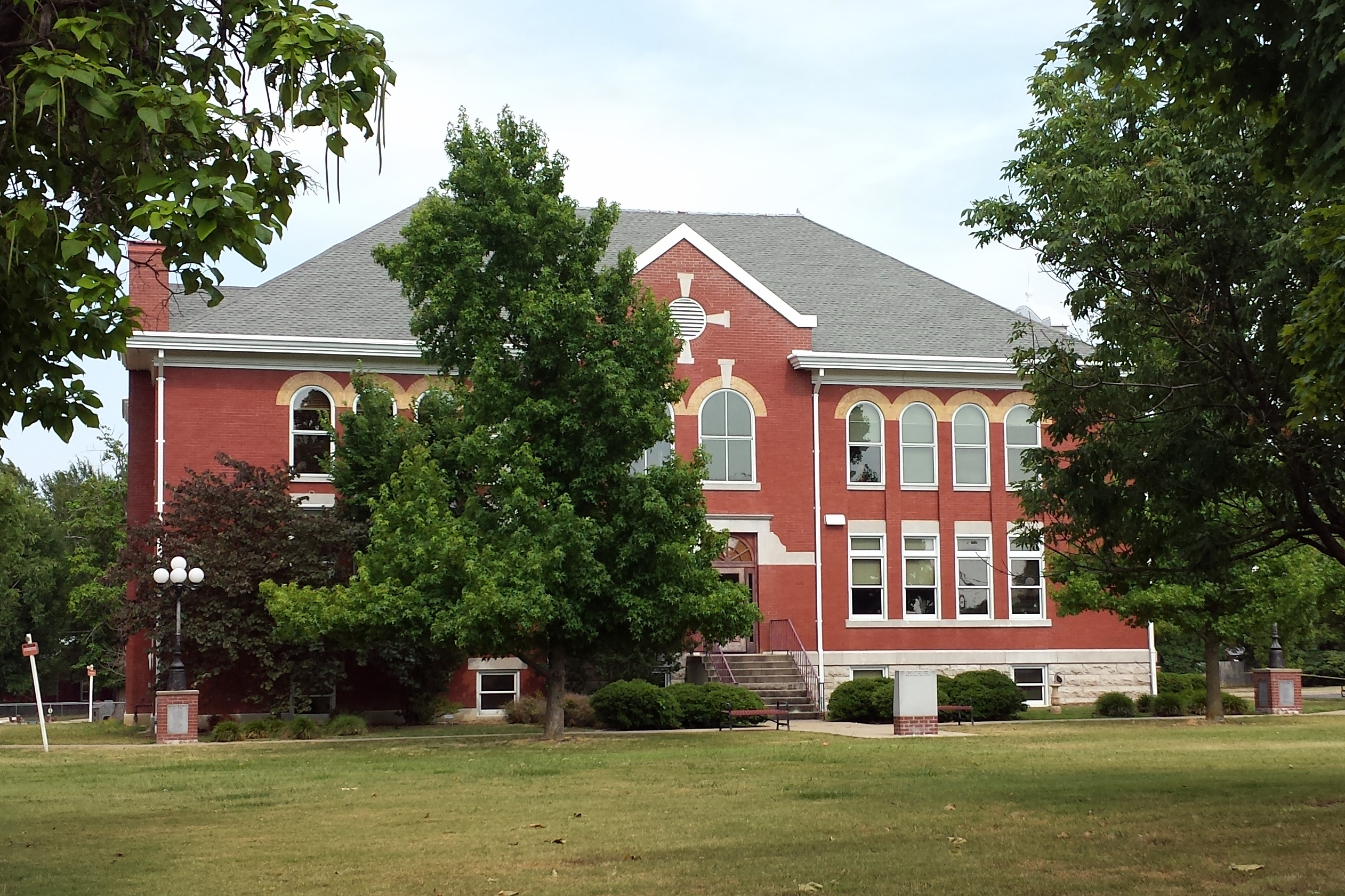

- Location within Arkansas Location within the United States
- Location: 804 W. Johnson Ave., Springdale, Arkansas
- Coordinates: 36.1872°N 94.1376°W
- Area: 4 acres (1.6 ha)
- Built: 1909
- Built by: Halter Brothers
- Architect: A. O. Clark
- Architectural style: Romanesque Revival
- NRHP reference No.: 94000469
- Added to NRHP: May 19, 1994

The Old Springdale High School is a historic former school building on Johnson Street in Springdale, Arkansas. It is a 2 1/2-story red brick Romanesque Revival building, with round-arch windows at the second level and a prominent entry pavilion at the center. The school was designed by A. O. Clark and completed in 1909. It is distinguished as a fine example of Clark's early work, and as the city's finest example of Romanesque architecture.

The building was listed on the National Register of Historic Places in 1994. It is currently used as the Springdale Public Schools Administration Building.

== See also ==
- National Register of Historic Places listings in Washington County, Arkansas
