= Mutual Aid Union Building =

Historic commercial building in Rogers, Arkansas

- U.S. National Register of Historic Places
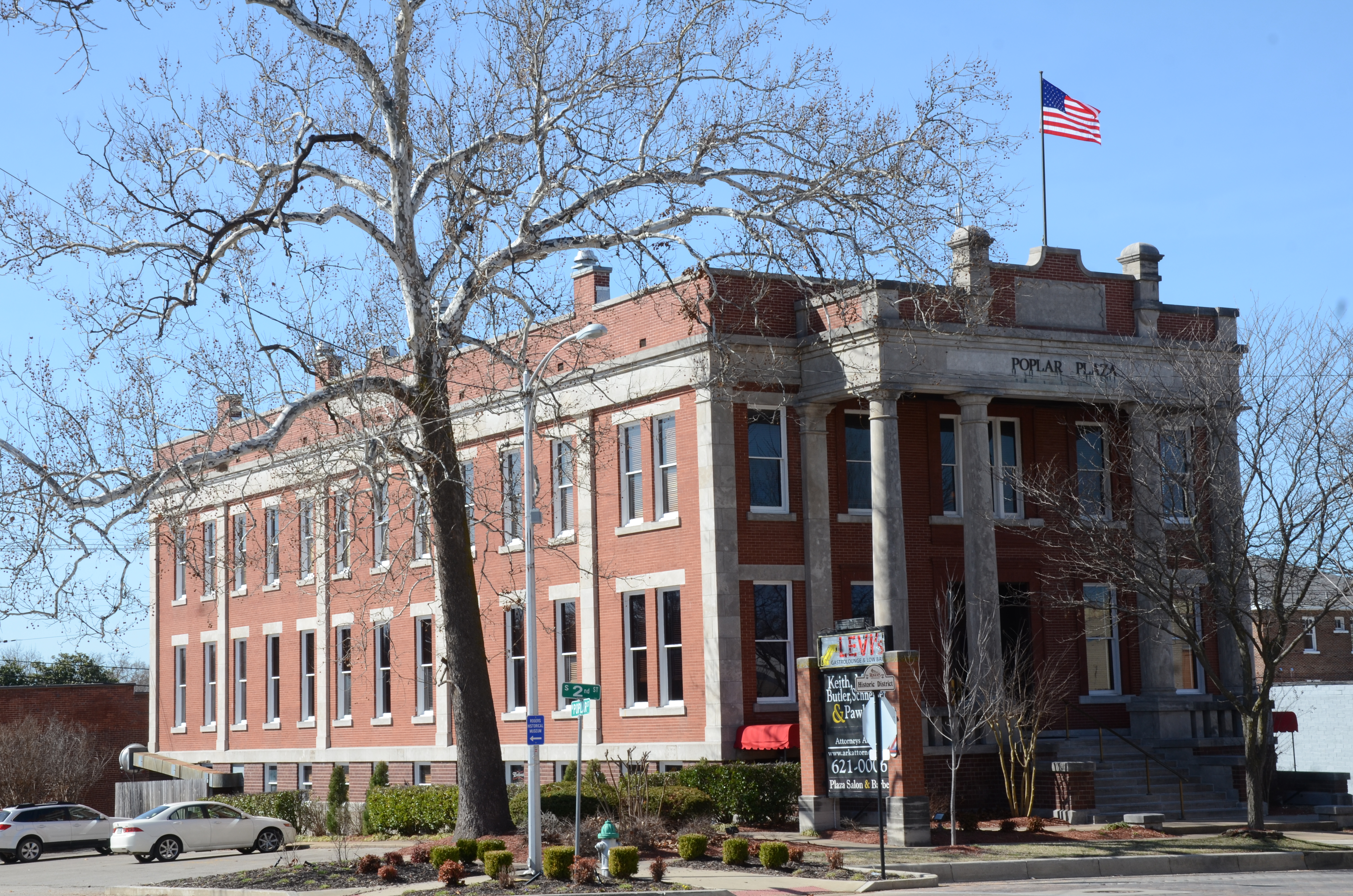

- Location within Arkansas Location within the United States
- Location: 2nd and Poplar Sts., Rogers, Arkansas
- Coordinates: 36°19′53″N 94°7′4″W
- Area: less than one acre
- Built: 1913
- Architect: William E. Matthews, Albert O. Clarke
- Architectural style: Classical Revival
- NRHP reference No.: 76000385
- Added to NRHP: October 14, 1976

The Mutual Aid Union Building is a historic commercial building at 2nd and Poplar Streets in Rogers, Arkansas. Designed by local architects William E. Matthews and A. O. Clarke and built in 1914, it is one of the region's finest Classical Revival buildings. It is a two-story stone and brick building, with a prominent two-story portico supported by four large Roman columns. The Mutual Aid Union, founded in 1907, was a mutual insurance company which sold policies organized into "circles" of 1,000, with dues-paying members making contributions based on their age.

The building was listed on the National Register of Historic Places in 1976.

== See also ==
- National Register of Historic Places listings in Benton County, Arkansas
