= Old Post Office (Rogers, Arkansas) =

- Rogers Post Office Building
- U.S. National Register of Historic Places
- U.S. Historic district – Contributing property
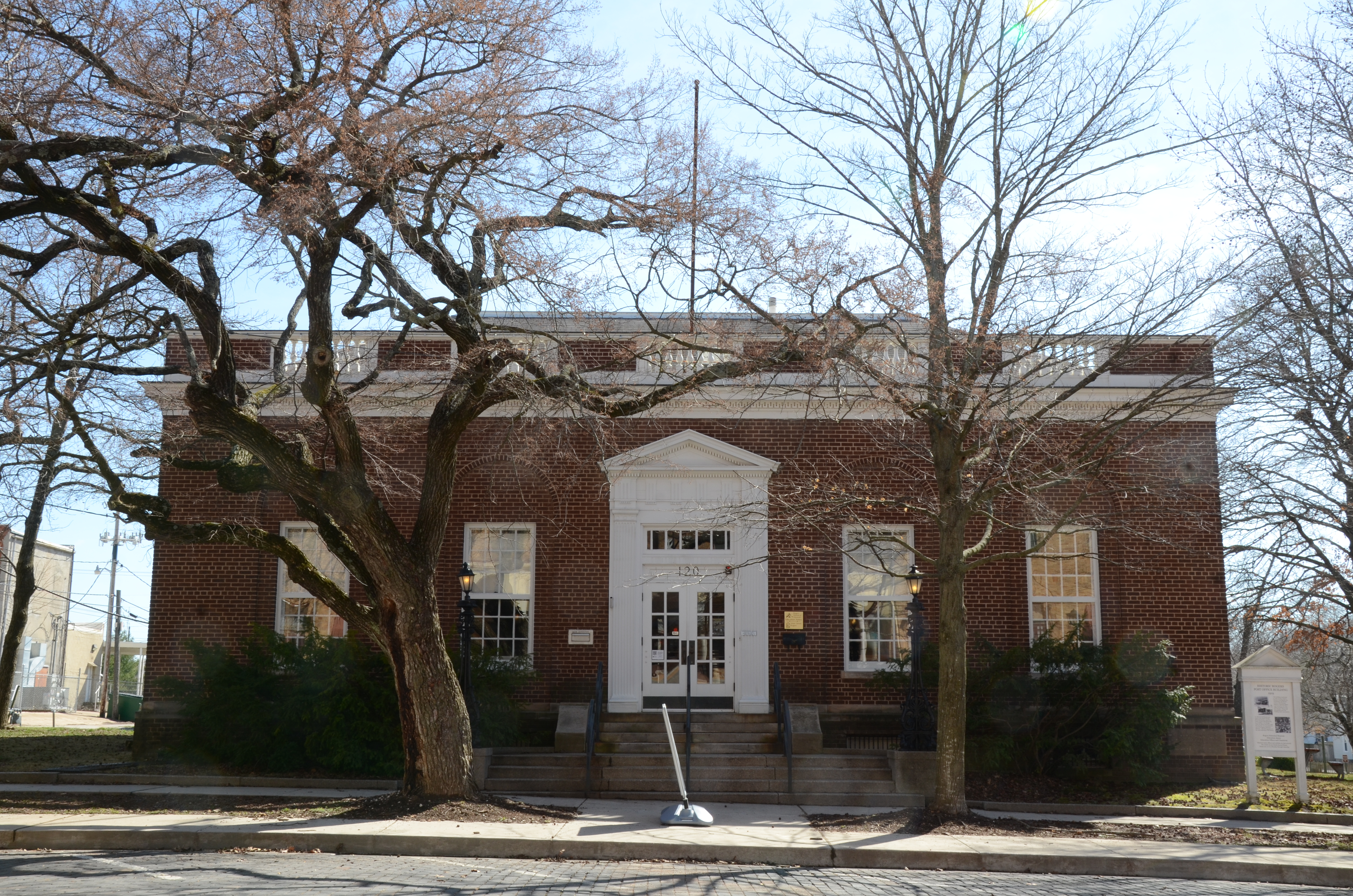

- Location within Arkansas Location within the United States
- Location: 120 W. Poplar St., Rogers, Arkansas
- Coordinates: 36°19′51″N 94°7′2″W
- Area: less than one acre
- Built: 1917
- Architect: Office of the Supervising Architect under James A. Wetmore
- Architectural style: Colonial Revival, Georgian Revival
- MPS: Benton County MRA
- NRHP reference No.: 87002408
- Added to NRHP: January 28, 1988

The Old Post Office, located at 120 West Poplar Street in Rogers, Arkansas, is a historic building originally constructed in 1917. Designed by the Office of the Supervising Architect, it is a single-story brick structure that exemplifies the Georgian Revival architectural style. The building functioned as the city's main post office until the late 1940s.

After its use as a post office ended, the building was repurposed to house the Rogers Public Library, which occupied the space from 1963 until 1994. Due to its architectural significance and historical importance, the building was listed on the National Register of Historic Places in 1988 under the name "Rogers Post Office Building".

== See also ==
- National Register of Historic Places listings in Benton County, Arkansas
