= Freeman-Felker House =

Historic house in Arkansas, United States

- U.S. National Register of Historic Places
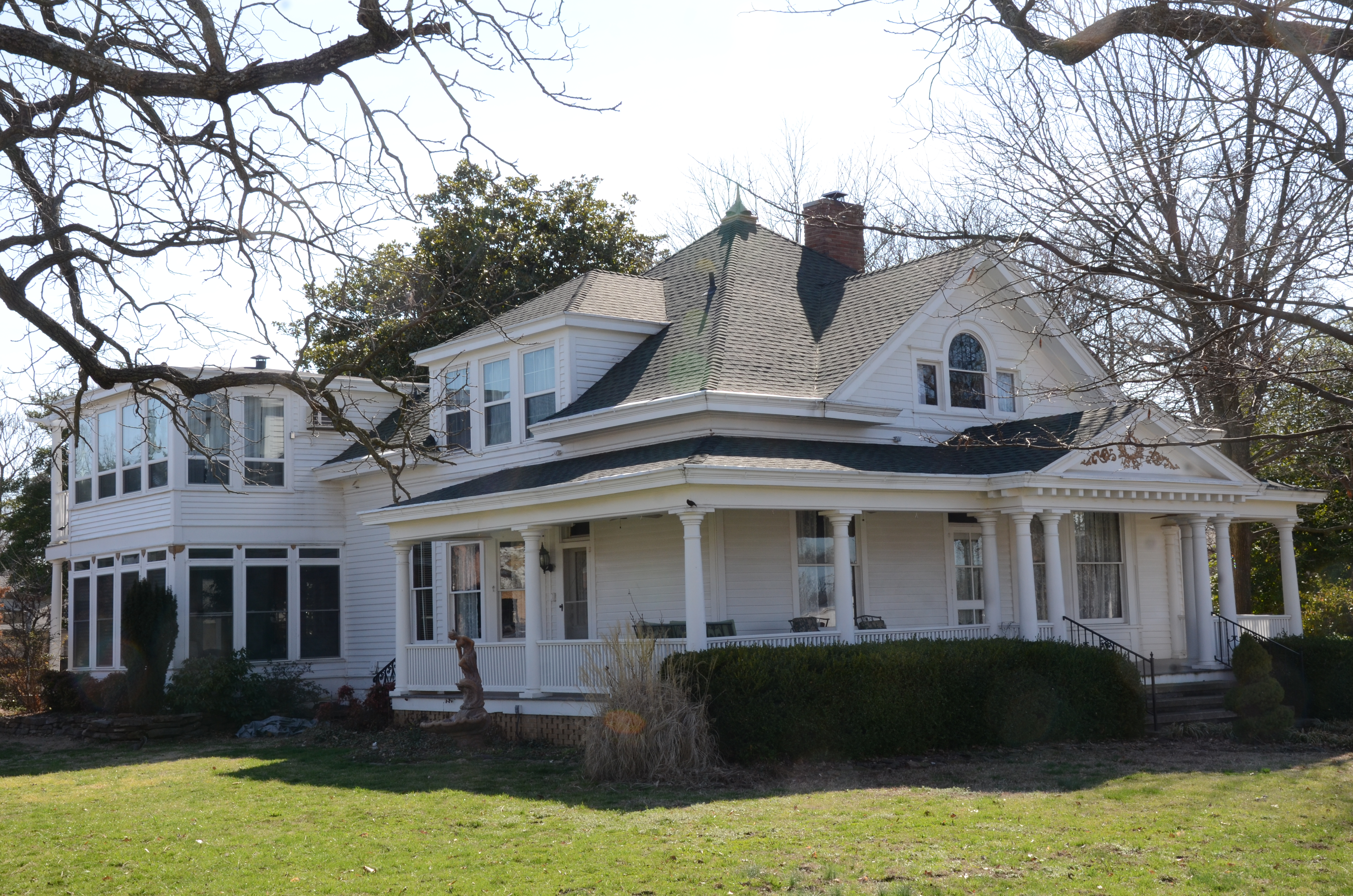

- Location within Arkansas Location within the United States
- Location: 318 W. Elm St., Rogers, Arkansas
- Coordinates: 36°19′55″N 94°7′11″W
- Area: less than one acre
- Built: 1903
- Architect: A.O. Clark
- Architectural style: Classical Revival
- MPS: Benton County MRA
- NRHP reference No.: 87002399
- Added to NRHP: January 28, 1988

The Freeman-Felker House is a historic house at 318 West Elm Street in Rogers, Arkansas, United States. It is a large two-story wood-frame structure, designed by local architect A. O. Clark and built in 1903 for a banker. The house has a pyramidal roof and a wraparound porch with Classical Revival detailing. A large gable projects slightly on the main facade, with a Palladian window at its center. The house includes a sunroom, added in the 1930s by its second owner, J. E. Felker, and also designed by Clark.

The house was listed on the National Register of Historic Places in 1988.

== See also ==
- National Register of Historic Places listings in Benton County, Arkansas
