= Lake Atalanta =

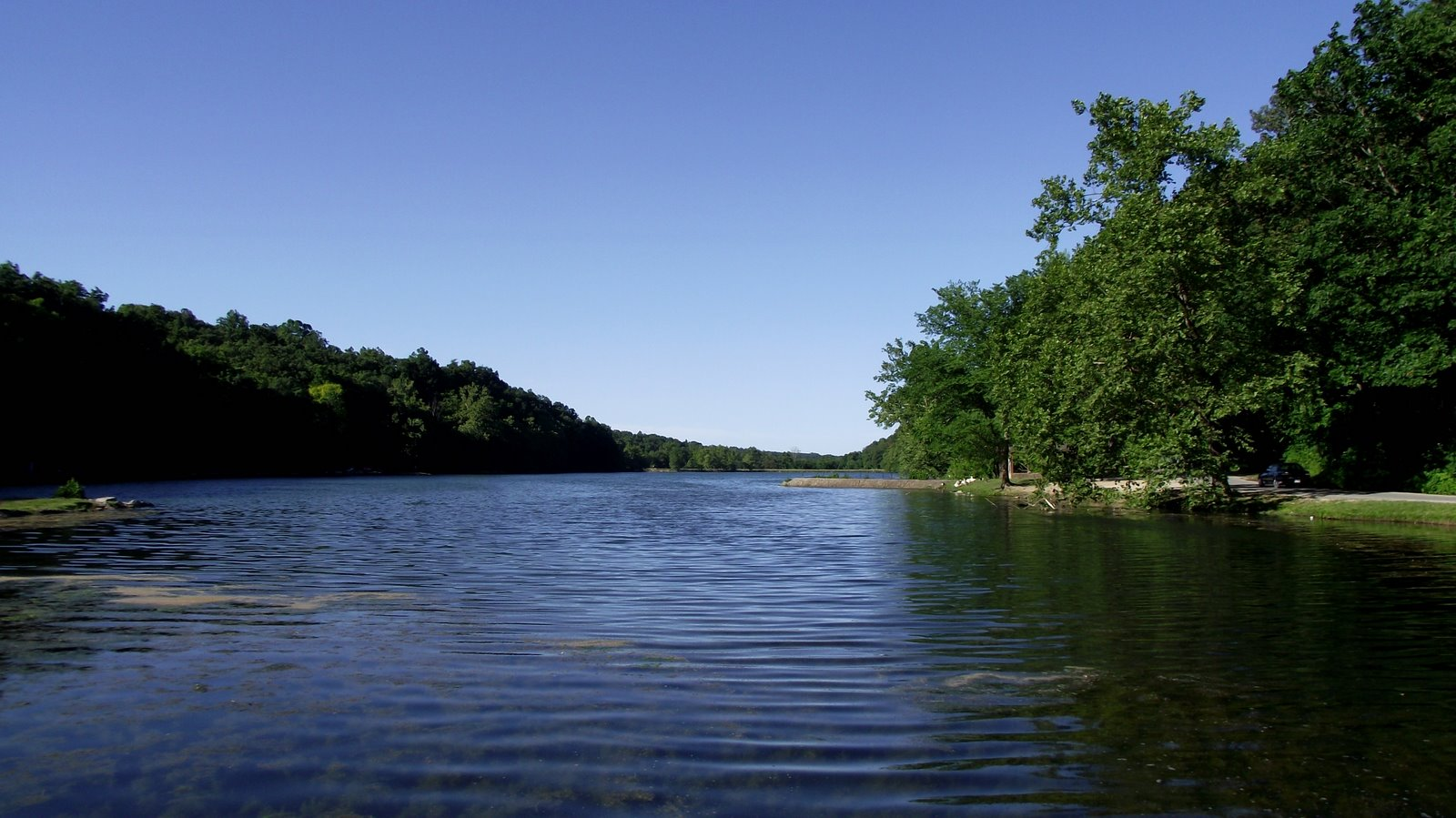
- Lake Atalanta, 2010

- Location within Arkansas
- Location: Rogers, Arkansas (Benton County)
- Coordinates: 36°20′18″N 94°5′54.9″W
- Lake type: reservoir
- Primary inflows: Prairie Creek
- Catchment area: 6.0 km^{2} (2.3 sq mi)
- Basin countries: United States
- Managing agency: City of Rogers
- Built: 1936
- Max. length: 0.28 km (0.17 mi)
- Surface area: 0.12 km^{2} (0.046 sq mi)
- Average depth: 13 m (43 ft)
- Water volume: 800 acre⋅ft (990,000 m^{3})
- Surface elevation: 370 m (1,210 ft)
- Islands: none

Lake Atalanta is a reservoir along Prairie Creek in Rogers, Arkansas, used primarily for recreation, built in 1936 by the Works Progress Administration. The lake is named for Atalanta Gregory, the wife of O.L. Gregory, who donated most of the land that now forms the lake. Lake Atalanta Dam is earthen with rock fill, and is 43 feet (13 m) tall and 910 feet (280 m) long.

== Lake Atalanta Park ==
Today, Lake Atalanta is surrounded by the second oldest park in Rogers. The park contains a playground, picnic area, and walking trail. Just below the dam is a second city park, Lake Atalanta Dam Site, constructed in 1987. The park was renovated in 2016, and connected with a bike trail to Downtown Rogers via the Railyard Bike Park.

=== Fishing ===
Lake Atalanta is part of the "Family and Community Fishing Program" for Arkansas. The lake is stocked with channel catfish in the summer months, and rainbow trout in the winter months. Stocking schedules and the special regulations that apply can be found in the current Arkansas fishing and trout fishing handbooks.

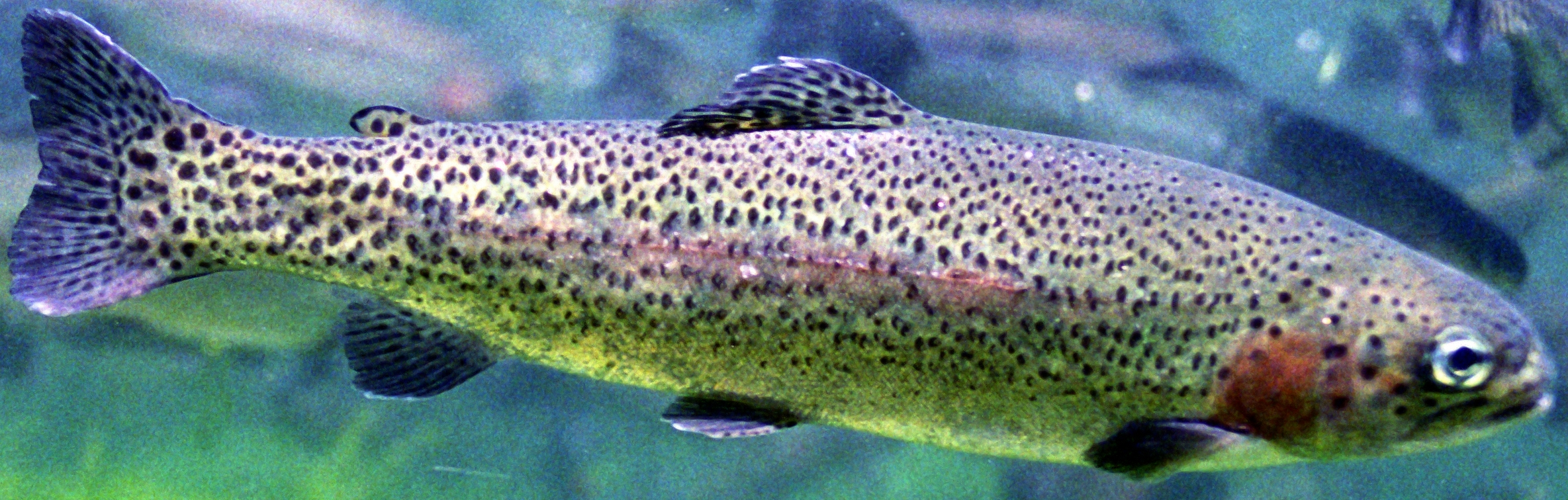
Rainbow trout are stocked in the winter months at Lake Atalanta, Arkansas.

== History ==
Lake Atalanta was constructed in 1936-1938 as a public works project of the Works Progress Administration, a New Deal-era agency. For the first ten years of its existence, the area around Lake Atalanta was undeveloped, and used primarily for fishing. In 1948 and 1949, a swimming pool, miniature golf course, roller skating rink, and restaurant were constructed. In the mid-1950s, Lake Atalanta became a water source for the city with the construction of a water treatment plant. During a drought in the 1960s, the lake nearly dried up, and was refilled by pumping water from nearby Beaver Lake. In 1970, Beaver Lake replaced Lake Atalanta as the city's water source.

== See also ==
- List of lakes in Benton County, Arkansas
