= Benton County National Bank =

- U.S. National Register of Historic Places
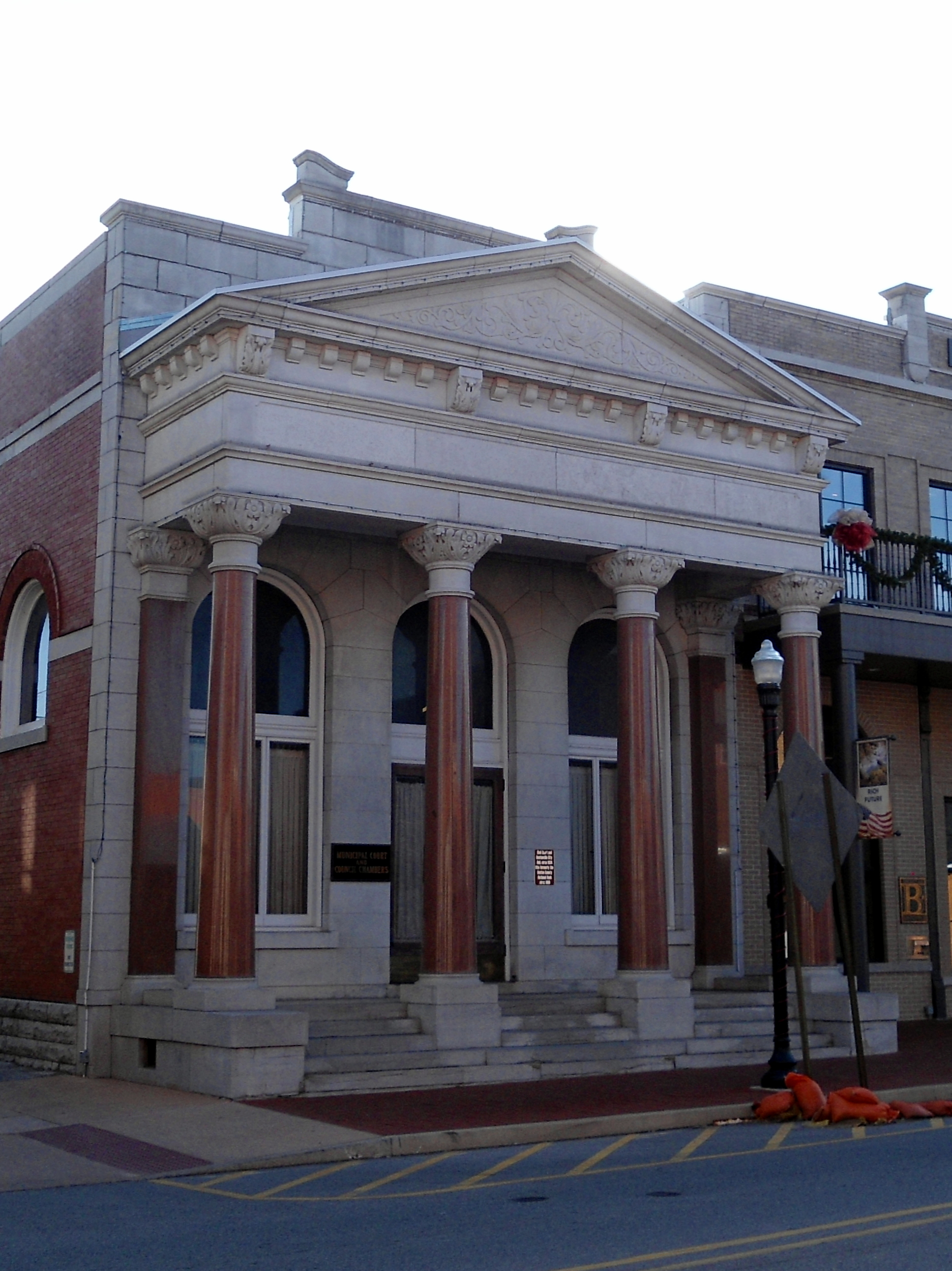

- Location within Arkansas Location within the United States
- Location: 123 W. Central, Bentonville, Arkansas
- Coordinates: 36°22′19″N 94°12′34″W
- Area: less than one acre
- Built: 1906
- Architect: Albert O. Clark
- Architectural style: Classical Revival
- NRHP reference No.: 83001156
- Added to NRHP: September 1, 1983

The Benton County National Bank is a historic bank building at 123 West Central Street in Bentonville, Arkansas. It is an elegant Classical Revival structure, designed by the regional architect Albert O. Clark and completed in 1906. It has a distinctive Roman-style temple front with three tall round-arch openings, which is sheltered by a projecting gable-pedimented Greek temple front supported by four marble columns with modified Corinthian capitals. A parapet above the Roman front obscures a dome at the center of the building.

The building was listed on the National Register of Historic Places in 1983.

== See also ==
- National Register of Historic Places listings in Benton County, Arkansas
