= Stroud House (Rogers, Arkansas) =

Historic house in Arkansas, United States

- Formerly listed on the U.S. National Register of Historic Places
- Location within Arkansas Location within the United States
- Location: 204 S. Third St., Rogers, Arkansas
- Coordinates: 36°19′55″N 94°7′8″W
- Area: less than one acre
- Built: 1912
- Architect: A.O. Clark
- Architectural style: Colonial Revival, Stick/Eastlake
- MPS: Benton County MRA
- NRHP reference No.: 87002400

Significant dates
- Added to NRHP: January 28, 1988
- Removed from NRHP: January 26, 2018

The Stroud House was a historic house at 204 Third Street in Rogers, Arkansas. It was a 1 1/2-story wood-frame cottage, set across Third Street from Bentonville City Hall. It was designed by architect A. O. Clark in Colonial Revival and Stick/Eastlake architecture for a leading local merchant. It had a wide porch cross the front, supported by Tuscan columns, with a central segmented-arch section above the stairs.

The house was listed on the U.S. National Register of Historic Places in 1988. It was subsequently demolished, and was delisted in 2018.

== See also ==
- Stroud House (Bentonville, Arkansas), also NRHP-listed
- National Register of Historic Places listings in Benton County, Arkansas
