= Applegate Drugstore =

- U.S. National Register of Historic Places
- U.S. Historic district – Contributing property
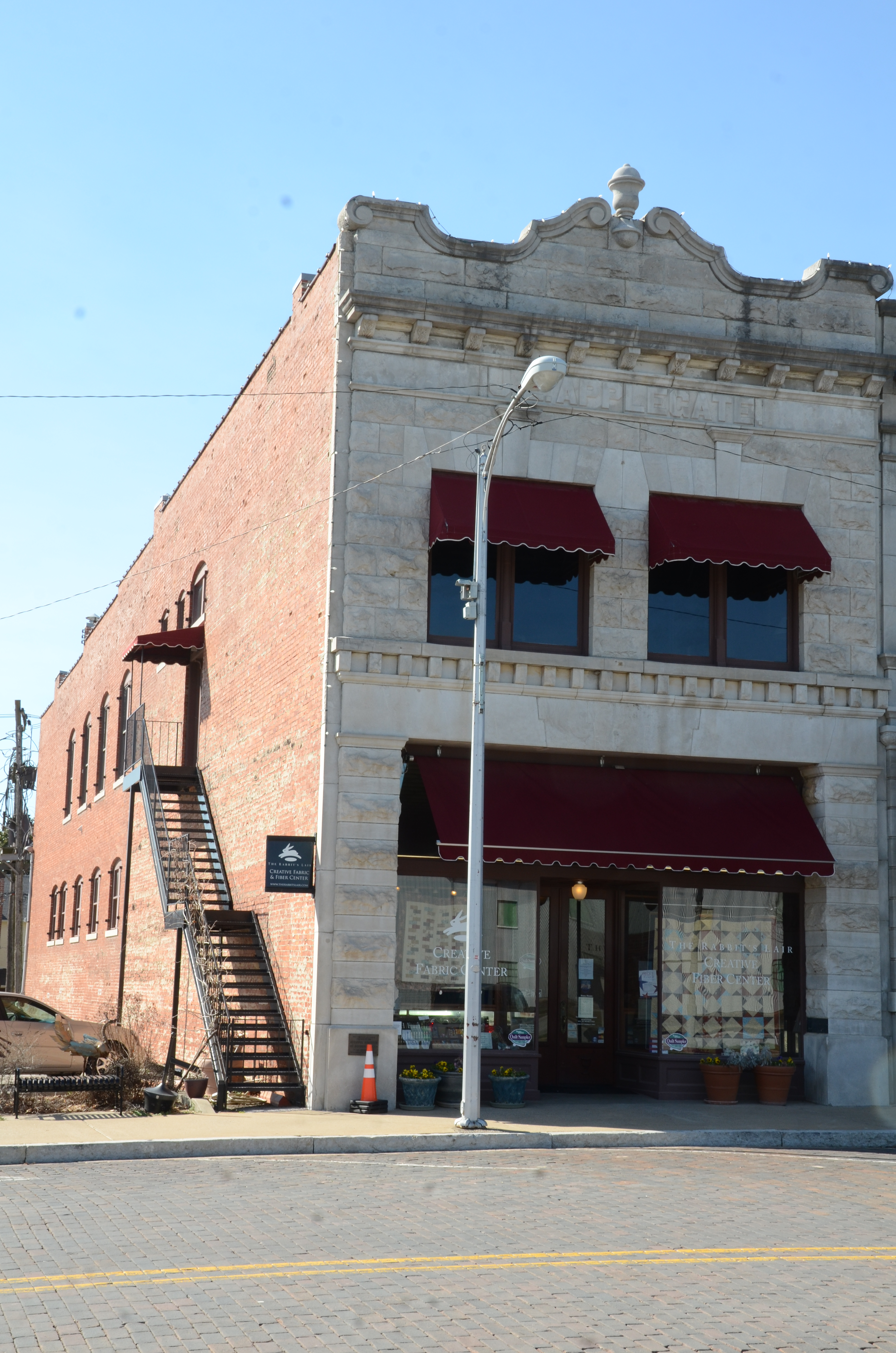

- Location within Arkansas Location within the United States
- Location: 116 1st St., Rogers, Arkansas
- Coordinates: 36°19′57″N 94°6′58″W
- Area: less than one acre
- Built: 1906
- Architect: A.O. Clark, John Myler
- Part of: Rogers Commercial Historic District (ID93001028)
- NRHP reference No.: 82002095

Significant dates
- Added to NRHP: June 23, 1982
- Designated CP: September 30, 1993

The Applegate Drugstore is a historic commercial building at 116 South First Street in Rogers, Arkansas. It is a two-story masonry building, with brick sidewalls and a limestone facade. Pilasters of alternating rough and smooth stone delineate the first floor elements of the storefront, rising to a freeze and dentillated ogee course between the floors. The second floor has two large bays, each with a pair of sash windows, delineated by Corinthian pilasters. The interior of the store retains original drugstore furnishings, including a pressed tin ceiling, tile floor, walnut shelving, and a polished marble fountain counter. The building was constructed in 1906 to house the drugstore of J.E. Applegate, and has housed similar retail operations since then. The building has one of Rogers' best-preserved early-20th century commercial interiors.

The building was listed on the National Register of Historic Places in 1982.

== See also ==
- National Register of Historic Places listings in Benton County, Arkansas
