= Bank of Rogers Building =

- U.S. National Register of Historic Places
- U.S. Historic district – Contributing property
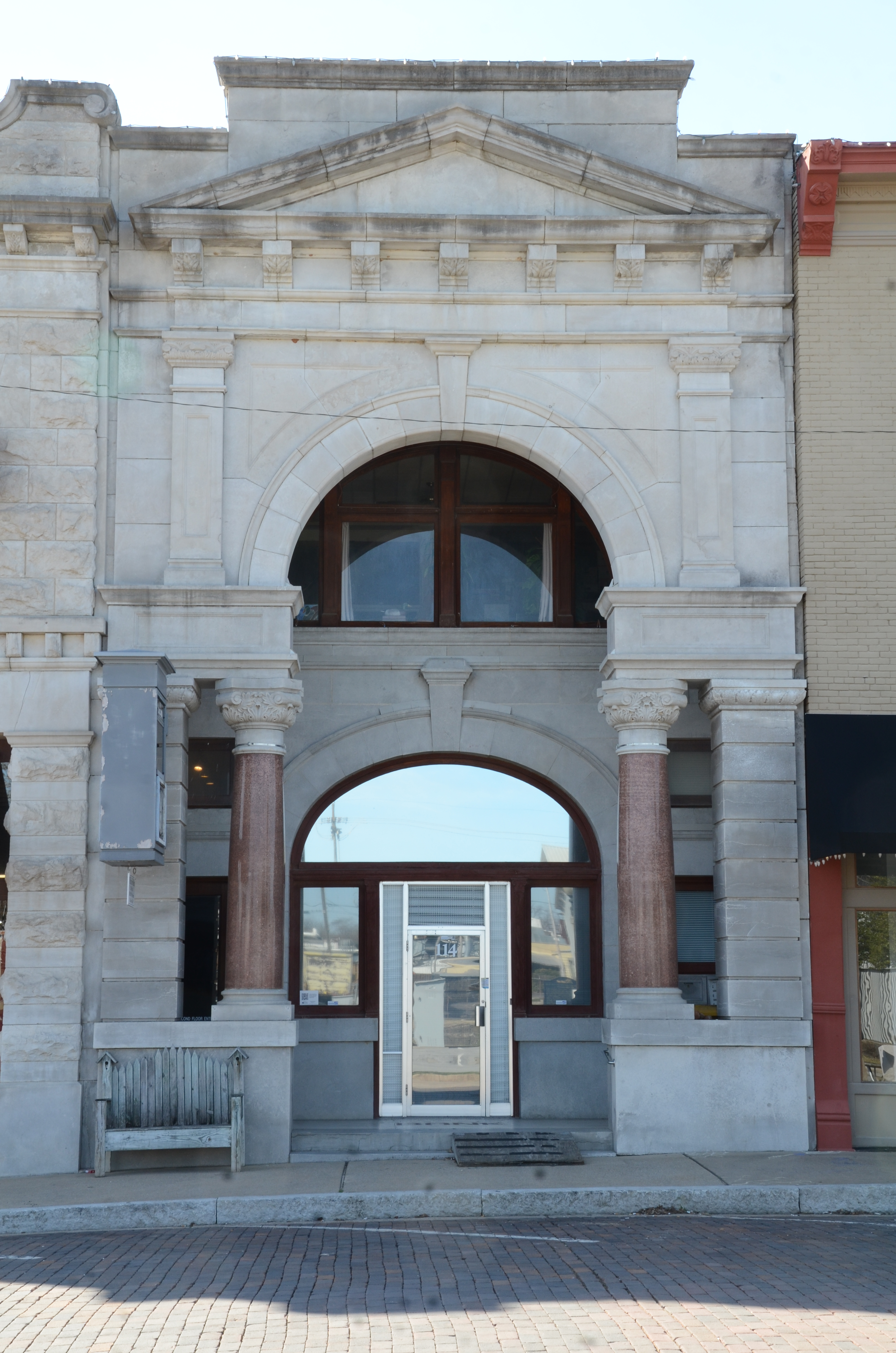

- Location within Arkansas Location within the United States
- Location: 114 S. 1st St., Rogers, Arkansas
- Coordinates: 36°19′57″N 94°6′58″W
- Area: less than one acre
- Built: 1906
- Architect: A.O. Clark
- Architectural style: Renaissance
- Part of: Rogers Commercial Historic District (ID93001028)
- NRHP reference No.: 80000773

Significant dates
- Added to NRHP: June 23, 1980
- Designated CP: September 30, 1993

The Bank of Rogers Building is a historic commercial building. It is located at 114 South 1st Street in Rogers, Arkansas. It is an elegant two story Renaissance Revival structure with a limestone front. There are two facades, one of which is set back under a large Roman arch, which forms the major element of the outer facade. This arch begins on the first level with square outer pillars and round inner ones, and is flanked on the second level by marble pilasters, which rise to support a projecting entablature and pediment. The inner facade has the main entrance under a segmented arch, with a pair of sash windows under a round arch on the second level.

The building was listed on the National Register of Historic Places in 1980. At that time it house the Rogers Historical Museum, which has since moved to modern facilities on 2nd Street.

== See also ==
- National Register of Historic Places listings in Benton County, Arkansas
