= Rogers Commercial Historic District =

Historic district in Rogers, Arkansas, United States

- U.S. National Register of Historic Places
- U.S. Historic district
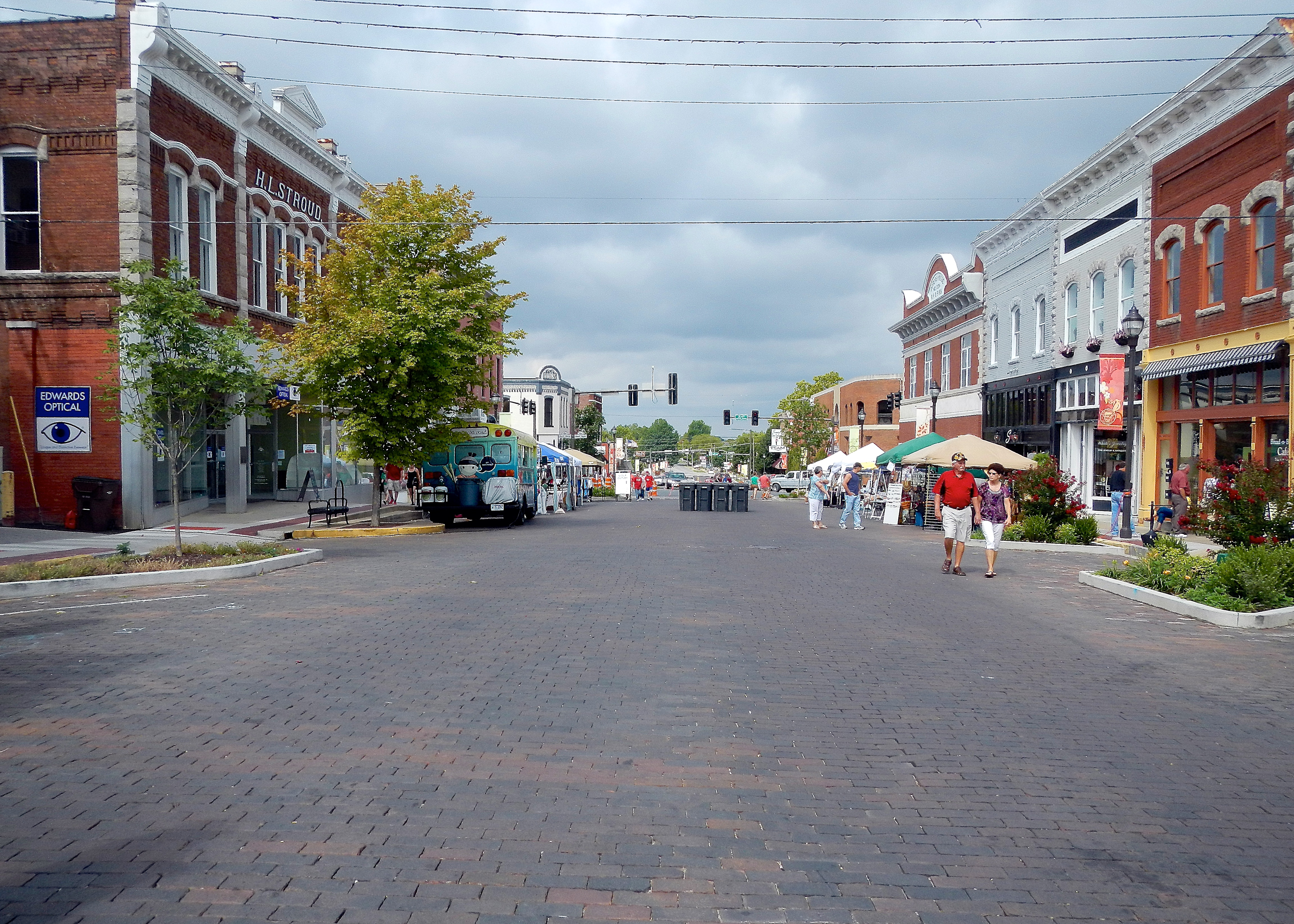
- Walnut Street

- Location within Arkansas Location within the United States
- Location: Walnut St. (original); Roughly bounded by Walnut, First, Poplar and Second Sts. (increase); 120 S. Second St. (increase II); 200 block of W. Elm St. (increase III); Rogers, Arkansas
- Coordinates: 36°19′59″N 94°7′0″W
- Area: 7 acres (2.8 ha)
- Built: 1885-1943
- Architect: Clark, A.O. and others
- Architectural style: Italianate (original); Colonial Revival, Mission/Spanish Revival, Italianate (increase); Early Commercial (increase II)
- MPS: Benton County MRA
- NRHP reference No.: 87002412 (original); 93001028 (increase 1); 98001482 (increase 2); 02001079 (increase 3); 12000855 (increase 4)

Significant dates
- Added to NRHP: January 28, 1988
- Boundary increases: September 30, 1993; December 09, 1998; October 4, 2002; October 17, 2012

The Rogers Commercial Historic District, known informally as Historic Downtown Rogers, is a historic district in the central business district of Rogers, Arkansas. When it was first listed on the National Register of Historic Places in 1988, it was known as the Walnut Street Historic District; this was changed when the district was enlarged in 1993. The district encompasses a portion of the city's central business district, whose historical significance extends from about 1885 to the end of World War II.

The original 1988 boundary of the district included buildings on two blocks of Walnut Street, between Second and Arkansas Streets, and encompasses a cluster of predominantly commercial buildings built between 1885 and 1912. These buildings were predominantly Italianate commercial masonry buildings. In 1993 the district was enlarged to include two blocks of First and Second Streets, between Walnut and Poplar Streets, which also included historically significant commercial buildings constructed up to 1943. This enlargement included the previously-listed Old Post Office, Lane Hotel, Applegate Drugstore, and Bank of Rogers Building. This enlargement included a wider variety of architectural styles, notably the Colonial Revival architecture of the old post office, and Spanish Colonial Revival architecture of the Lane Hotel. The district was further enlarged in 1998 to include 120 South Second Street, and in 2002 to include the Victory Theater. In 2012 it was enlarged yet again, adding the 200 block of West Elm Street.

== Contributing buildings ==
- Stroud's Mercantile, 114-116 W. Walnut St, built 1898

== Gallery ==
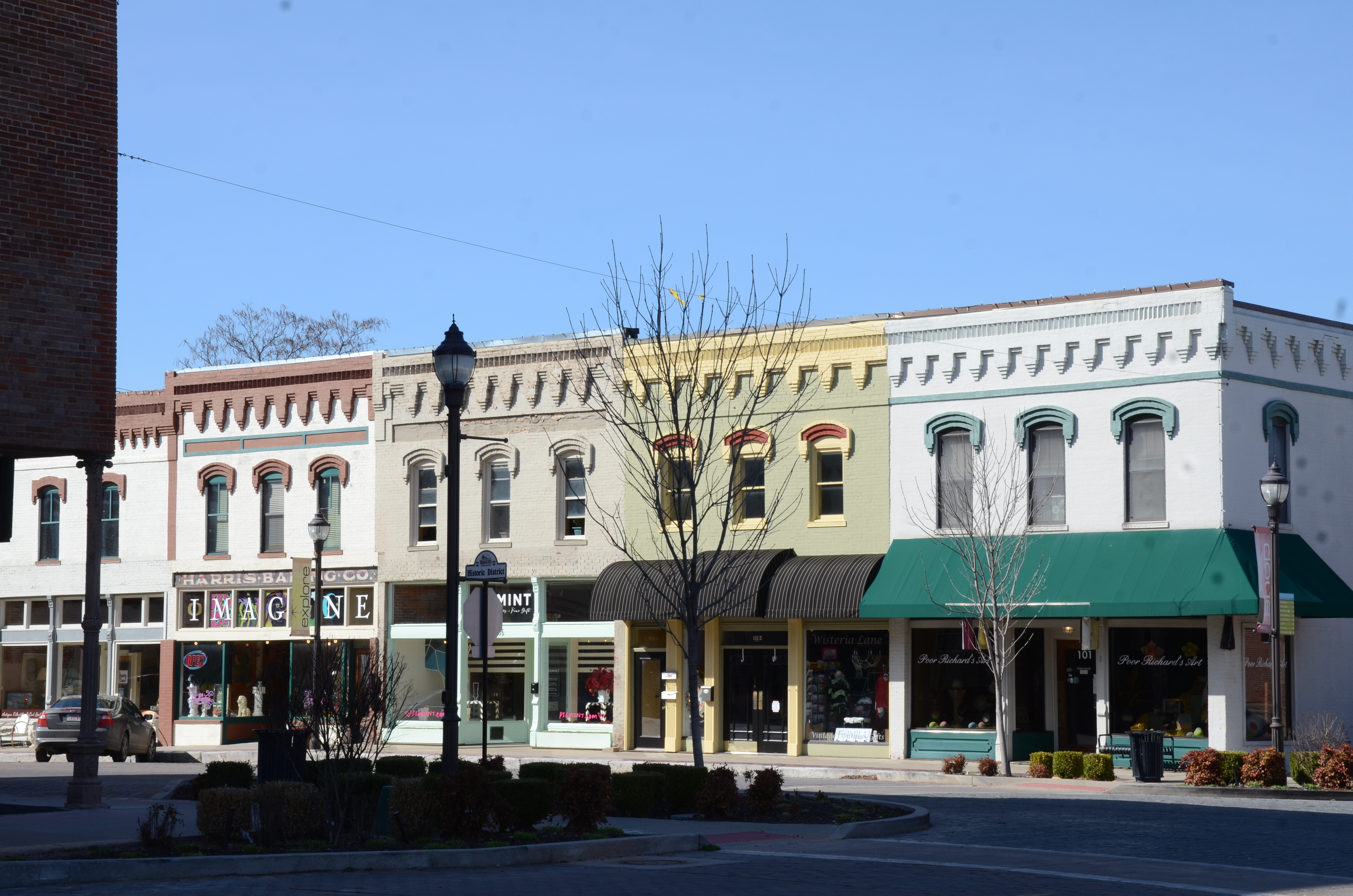
101-109 W Walnut St.

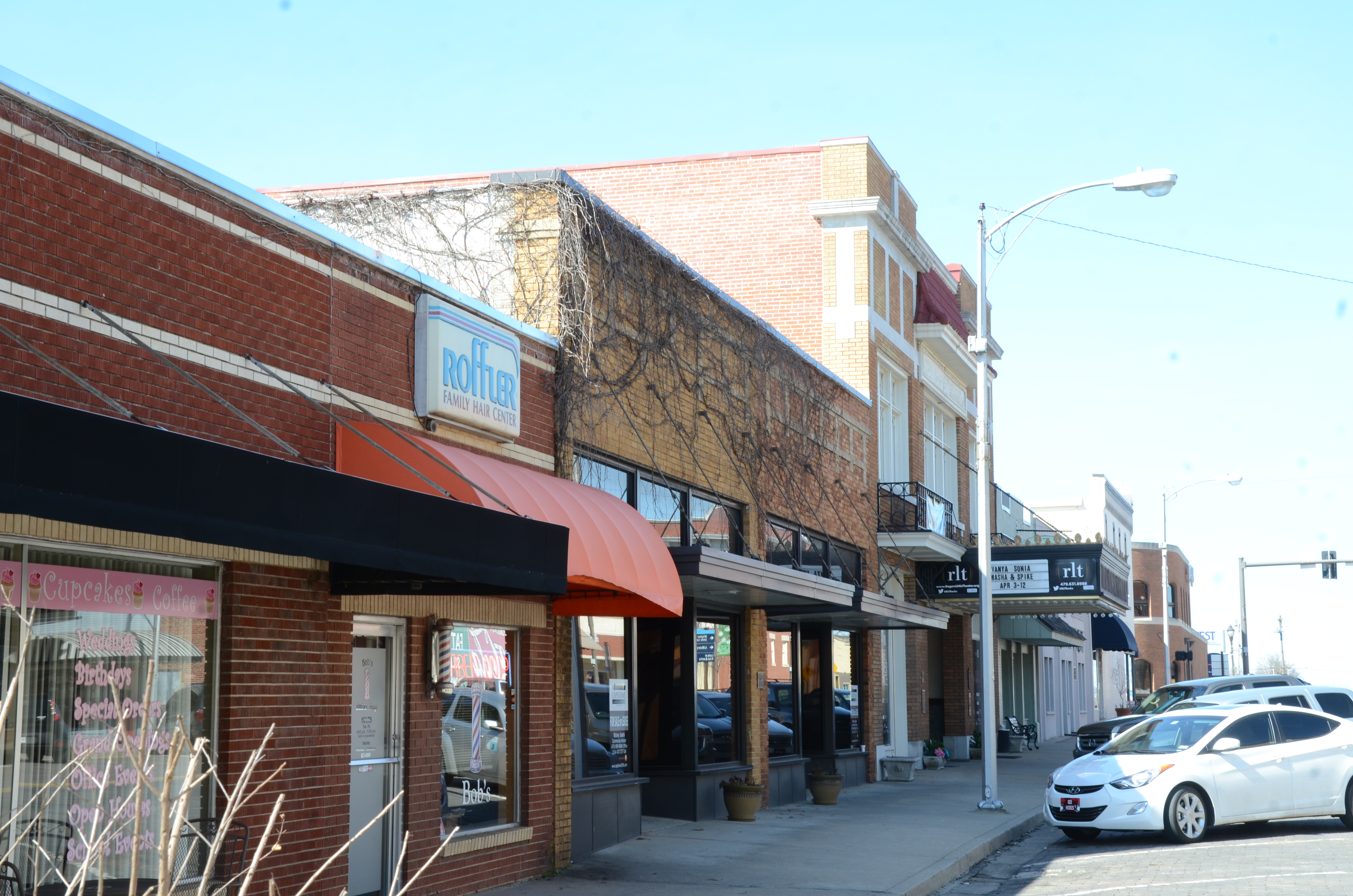
Victory Theater and neighboring buildings on 2nd St.

== See also ==
- National Register of Historic Places listings in Benton County, Arkansas
