= Benton County Jail =

- U.S. National Register of Historic Places
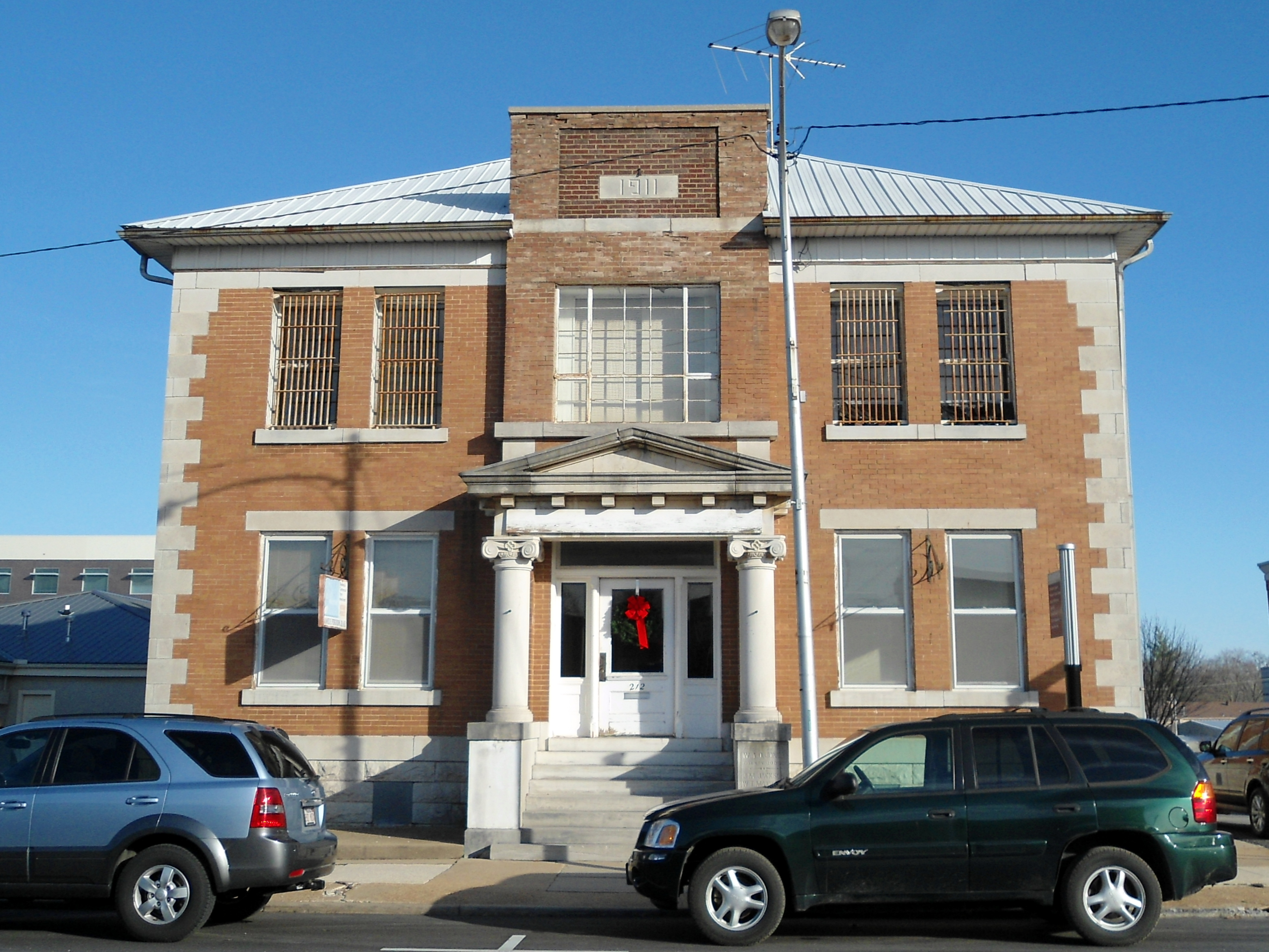

- Location within Arkansas Location within the United States
- Location: 212 N. Main St., Bentonville, Arkansas
- Coordinates: 36°22′25″N 94°12′30″W
- Area: less than one acre
- Built: 1911
- Built by: Pace, Lon A.
- Architect: Clark, A.O.
- MPS: Benton County MRA
- NRHP reference No.: 87002334
- Added to NRHP: January 28, 1988

The Benton County Jail is a historic county jail building at 212 North Main Street in Bentonville, Arkansas, United States. It is a two-story brick Classical Revival building, designed by A. O. Clark and completed in 1911. It has pronounced limestone corner quoining, and its main entrance is flanked by Ionic columns and topped by a gabled pediment. The building is notable as a rare smaller-scale work by Clark.

The building was listed on the National Register of Historic Places in 1988.

== See also ==
- National Register of Historic Places listings in Benton County, Arkansas
