= Stroud House (Bentonville, Arkansas) =

Historic house in Arkansas, United States

- U.S. National Register of Historic Places
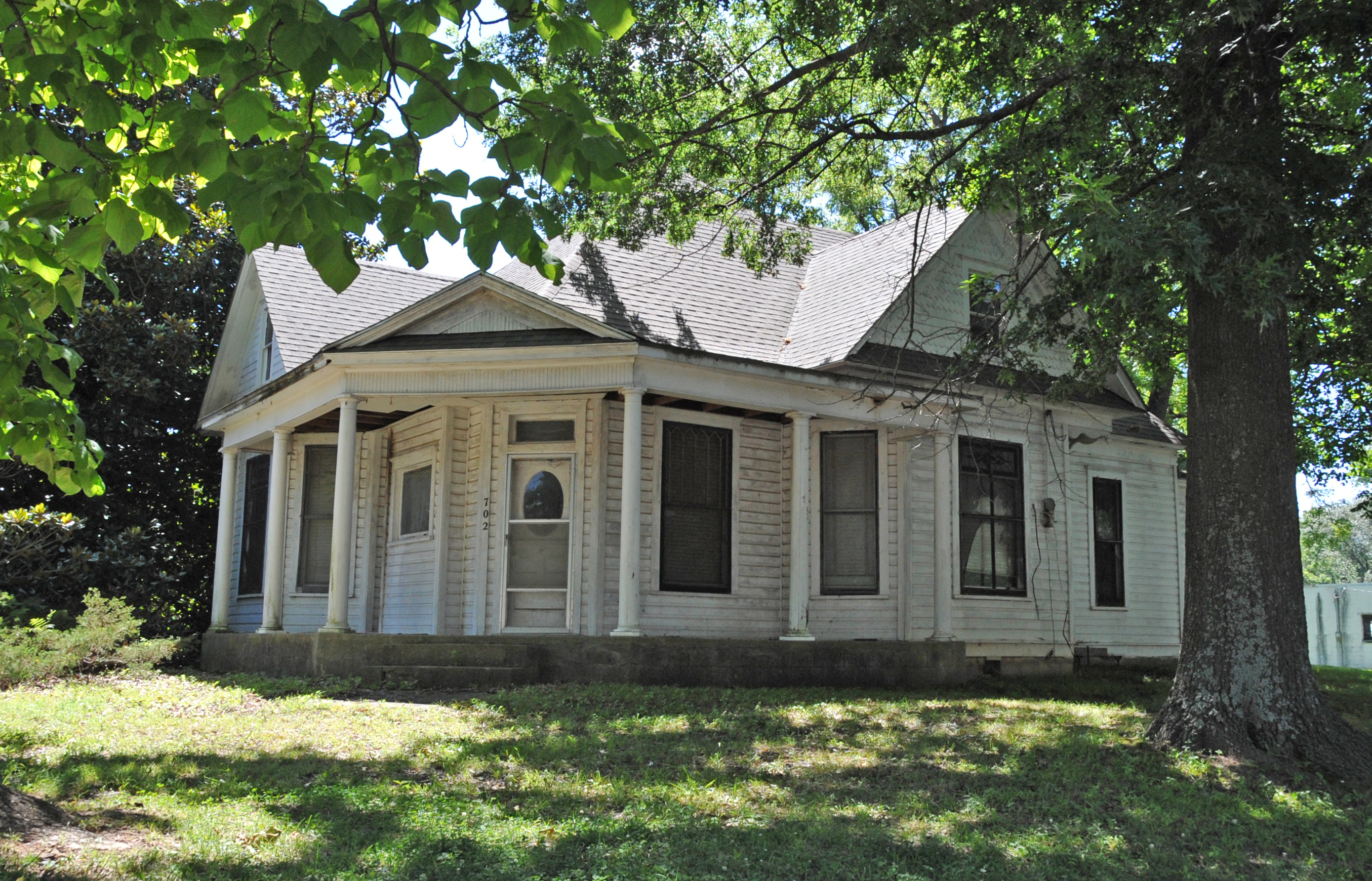

- Location within Arkansas Location within the United States
- Location: Jct. of SE F St. and E. Central Ave., SE corner, Bentonville, Arkansas
- Coordinates: 36°22′18″N 94°12′4″W
- Built: 1903
- Architectural style: Queen Anne, Colonial Revival
- MPS: Benton County MRA
- NRHP reference No.: 96000527
- Added to NRHP: May 10, 1996

The Stroud House is a historic house at SE F Street and East Central Avenue in Bentonville, Arkansas. It is a 1 1/2-story wood-frame structure, with asymmetrical massing and decorative shinglework typical of the Queen Anne style, and a shed-roof front porch supported by Colonial Revival columns. It is a high-quality local example of this transitional style of architecture, built in 1903 by Daniel Boone Laine and Delila Laine. The property also includes remnants of a 1925 gas station.

The house was listed on the National Register of Historic Places in 1986.

== See also ==
- Stroud House (Rogers, Arkansas)
- National Register of Historic Places listings in Benton County, Arkansas
