= Rogers, Arkansas =

City in the United States

- City
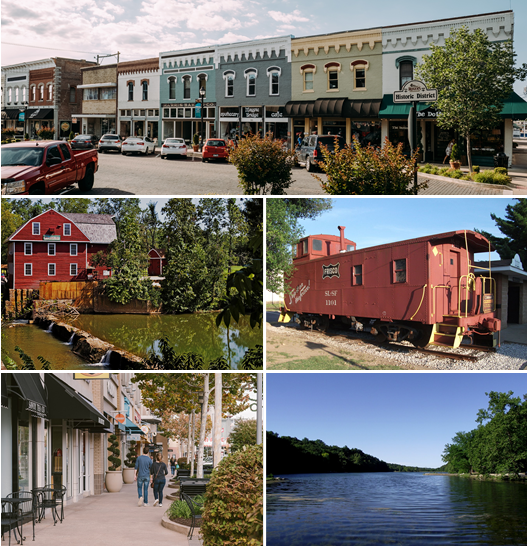
- Clockwise from top: Downtown Rogers, the Centennial Caboose, Lake Atalanta, Pinnacle Hills Promenade, War Eagle Mill

- Flag Seal
- Nickname: "The City"
- Interactive map of Rogers, Arkansas
- Location within Arkansas Location within the United States
- Coordinates: 36°19′51″N 94°06′28″W
- Country: United States
- State: Arkansas
- County: Benton
- Established: 1881
- Incorporated: June 6, 1881
- Named for: Captain Charles Warrington Rogers

Government
  - Mayor: Greg Hines (R)

Area
  - City: 39.07 sq mi (101.18 km^{2})
  - Land: 38.90 sq mi (100.74 km^{2})
  - Water: 0.17 sq mi (0.44 km^{2})
  - Urban: 42.01 sq mi (108.81 km^{2})
- Elevation: 1,352 ft (412 m)

Population (2020)
  - City: 69,908
  - Estimate (2025): 76,956 ▲
  - Density: 1,877/sq mi (724.7/km^{2})
  - Urban: 172,585
  - Metro: 576,403
- Time zone: UTC−6 (Central (CST))
  - Summer (DST): UTC−5 (CDT)
- ZIP codes: 72756-72757-72758
- Area code: 479
- FIPS code: 05-60410
- GNIS feature ID: 2404644
- Website: rogersar.gov

Rogers is a city in Benton County, Arkansas, United States. The population was 69,908 at the 2020 census, and was estimated at 75,639 in 2024, making it the sixth-most populous city in the state. Located in the Ozarks, it is part of the three-county Northwest Arkansas metropolitan area, which had 546,725 residents in 2020.

Rogers was the location of the first Walmart store, whose corporate headquarters is located in neighboring Bentonville. The city was also the location of the first 7 Brew coffeehouse. Daisy Outdoor Products, known for its air rifles, has both its headquarters and its Airgun Museum in Rogers. The city houses a popular shopping center, the Pinnacle Hills Promenade, and a music venue, the Walmart Arkansas Music Pavilion (a.k.a. Walmart AMP), that has hosted performances by big-name artists and local performers.

== History ==
Rogers was named after Captain Charles W. Rogers, who was vice-president and general manager of the St. Louis and San Francisco Railway, also known as the Frisco. The town was established in 1881, the year the Frisco line arrived; it was at this time the area residents honored Captain Rogers by naming it for him. The community was incorporated on June 6, 1881. In 1883, Rogers became the starting point of the Bentonville Railroad, which linked the town with Bentonville, about six miles. That line, under its subsequent owner the Arkansas and Oklahoma Railroad, later extended as far as Grove, Oklahoma. Today, only the Rogers-to-Bentonville segment remains in use.

=== Historic commerce ===
The first retail business owned by the Stroud family was a store in Pea Ridge, Arkansas, which was co-owned by Allen Bryant Stroud (1831–1914) and his son Harlan Lafayette (H.L.) Stroud (1858–1950). That business was established prior to 1879 and Allen Stroud also served as postmaster at Pea Ridge for a time. In 1884, H.L. Stroud sold his interest in the Stroud store in Pea Ridge and purchased a dry goods store at the corner of First and Walnut Streets in Rogers which he named Stroud's Mercantile.

In 1887 he brought in his brothers Evan Giesen and Dominic Goerig (1868–1952) to serve as managers of his new business. In 1891 H.L. Stroud moved his business into a storefront on the north side of the 100 block of Walnut Street. Stroud's continued to prosper, and in 1899 H.L. built the brick building at 114–116 West Walnut Street. Stroud's continued to be the leading retail business in Rogers up into the 1960s, when in 1962 Sam Walton opened the first location of what would become the retail giant Walmart just seven blocks away. Walton's new store combined with the nationwide movement of retail centers from aged downtowns to malls and shopping centers slowly eroded Stroud's customer base, leading the locally beloved retailer to permanently close in 1993 after 109 years in business.

In 1912 the city council formed a commission of local businessmen to facilitate the paving of downtown Rogers. Despite the constant complaints of dusty and muddy streets, and the enthusiastic support of prominent citizens such as Coin Harvey, bickering over the cost and method of paving delayed the start of the project until July 1924. The downtown area was paved with concrete and overlaid with bricks in rows, changing to a basket weave pattern at the intersections of streets. The work was completed in December 1924, and the brick pavement remains today, with renovations done to the streets in 2010.

== Geography ==
According to the United States Census Bureau, the city has a total area of 33.6 square miles (87 km^{2}), of which 33.5 square miles (87 km^{2}) is land and 0.1 square miles (0.26 km^{2}) (0.15%) is water.

=== Climate ===
The climate in this area is characterized by warm, humid summers and generally mild to cool winters. According to the Köppen Climate Classification system, Rogers has a humid subtropical climate, abbreviated "Cfa" on climate maps.

== Demographics ==
Historical population
| Census | Pop. | Note | %± |
|---|---|---|---|
| 1890 | 1,265 | | — |
| 1900 | 2,158 | | 70.6% |
| 1910 | 2,820 | | 30.7% |
| 1920 | 3,318 | | 17.7% |
| 1930 | 3,554 | | 7.1% |
| 1940 | 3,550 | | −0.1% |
| 1950 | 4,962 | | 39.8% |
| 1960 | 5,700 | | 14.9% |
| 1970 | 11,050 | | 93.9% |
| 1980 | 17,429 | | 57.7% |
| 1990 | 24,692 | | 41.7% |
| 2000 | 38,829 | | 57.3% |
| 2010 | 55,964 | | 44.1% |
| 2020 | 69,908 | | 24.9% |
| 2025 (est.) | 76,956 | ▲ | 10.1% |
U.S. Decennial Census

=== Racial and ethnic composition ===
Rogers city, Arkansas – racial and ethnic composition Note: the US Census treats Hispanic/Latino as an ethnic category. This table excludes Latinos from the racial categories and assigns them to a separate category. Hispanics/Latinos may be of any race.
| Race / ethnicity (NH = Non-Hispanic) | Pop. 2000 | Pop. 2010 | Pop. 2020 | % 2000 | % 2010 | % 2020 |
|---|---|---|---|---|---|---|
| White alone (NH) | 29,866 | 34,718 | 38,783 | 76.92% | 62.04% | 55.48% |
| Black or African American alone (NH) | 145 | 716 | 1,016 | 0.37% | 1.28% | 1.45% |
| Native American or Alaska Native alone (NH) | 346 | 468 | 534 | 0.89% | 0.84% | 0.76% |
| Asian alone (NH) | 550 | 1,400 | 1,920 | 1.42% | 2.50% | 2.75% |
| Native Hawaiian or Pacific Islander alone (NH) | 29 | 135 | 1,015 | 0.07% | 0.24% | 1.45% |
| Other race alone (NH) | 26 | 75 | 235 | 0.07% | 0.13% | 0.34% |
| Mixed-race or multiracial (NH) | 377 | 833 | 3,030 | 0.97% | 1.49% | 4.33% |
| Hispanic or Latino (any race) | 7,490 | 17,619 | 23,375 | 19.29% | 31.48% | 33.44% |
| Total | 38,829 | 55,964 | 69,908 | 100.00% | 100.00% | 100.00% |

=== 2020 census ===
As of the 2020 census, Rogers had a population of 69,908, with 24,860 households and 16,517 families residing in the city.

The median age was 34.0 years. 27.4% of residents were under the age of 18 and 11.9% of residents were 65 years of age or older. For every 100 females there were 96.3 males, and for every 100 females age 18 and over there were 93.3 males age 18 and over.

98.5% of residents lived in urban areas, while 1.5% lived in rural areas.

Of the 24,860 households, 38.5% had children under the age of 18 living in them. Of all households, 51.5% were married-couple households, 16.1% were households with a male householder and no spouse or partner present, and 25.2% were households with a female householder and no spouse or partner present. About 24.4% of all households were made up of individuals and 8.5% had someone living alone who was 65 years of age or older.

There were 26,389 housing units, of which 5.8% were vacant. The homeowner vacancy rate was 1.5% and the rental vacancy rate was 7.0%.

Rogers racial composition
| Race | Number | Percent |
|---|---|---|
| White | 42,632 | 61.0% |
| Black or African American | 1,069 | 1.5% |
| American Indian and Alaska Native | 1,106 | 1.6% |
| Asian | 1,949 | 2.8% |
| Native Hawaiian and Other Pacific Islander | 1,035 | 1.5% |
| Some other race | 12,950 | 18.5% |
| Two or more races | 9,167 | 13.1% |

=== 2010 census ===
As of 2010 Rogers had a population of 55,964. The racial and ethnic composition of the population was 62.0% non-Hispanic white, 1.3% non-Hispanic black, 1.0% Native American, 2.5% Asian, 0.3% Pacific Islander, 0.1% non-Hispanics of some other race, 3.0% from two or more races and 31.5% Hispanic or Latino.

=== 2000 census ===
As of the census of 2000, there were 38,829 people, 14,005 households, and 10,209 families residing in the city. The population density was 1,158.0 inhabitants per square mile (447.1/km^{2}). There were 14,836 housing units at an average density of 442.4 per square mile (170.8/km^{2}). The racial makeup of the city was 90.75% White, 0.47% Black or African American, 1.05% Native American, 1.43% Asian, 0.07% Pacific Islander, 9.43% from other races, and 1.80% from two or more races. 19.29% of the population are Hispanic or Latino of any race.

There were 14,005 households, out of which 39.4% had children under the age of 18 living with them, 58.4% were married couples living together, 10.1% had a female householder with no husband present, and 27.1% were non-families. 22.2% of all households were made up of individuals, and 8.9% had someone living alone who was 65 years of age or older. The average household size was 2.74 and the average family size was 3.21.

In the city, the population was spread out, with 29.4% under the age of 18, 9.0% from 18 to 24, 31.5% from 25 to 44, 18.3% from 45 to 64, and 11.8% who were 65 years of age or older. The median age was 32 years. For every 100 females, there were 95.3 males. For every 100 females age 18 and over, there were 91.5 males.

The median income for a household in the city was $40,474, and the median income for a family was $45,876. Males had a median income of $30,911 versus $22,020 for females. The per capita income for the city was $19,761. About 9.4% of families and 12.8% of the population were below the poverty line, including 17.6% of those under age 18 and 10.1% of those age 65 or over.

== Culture ==
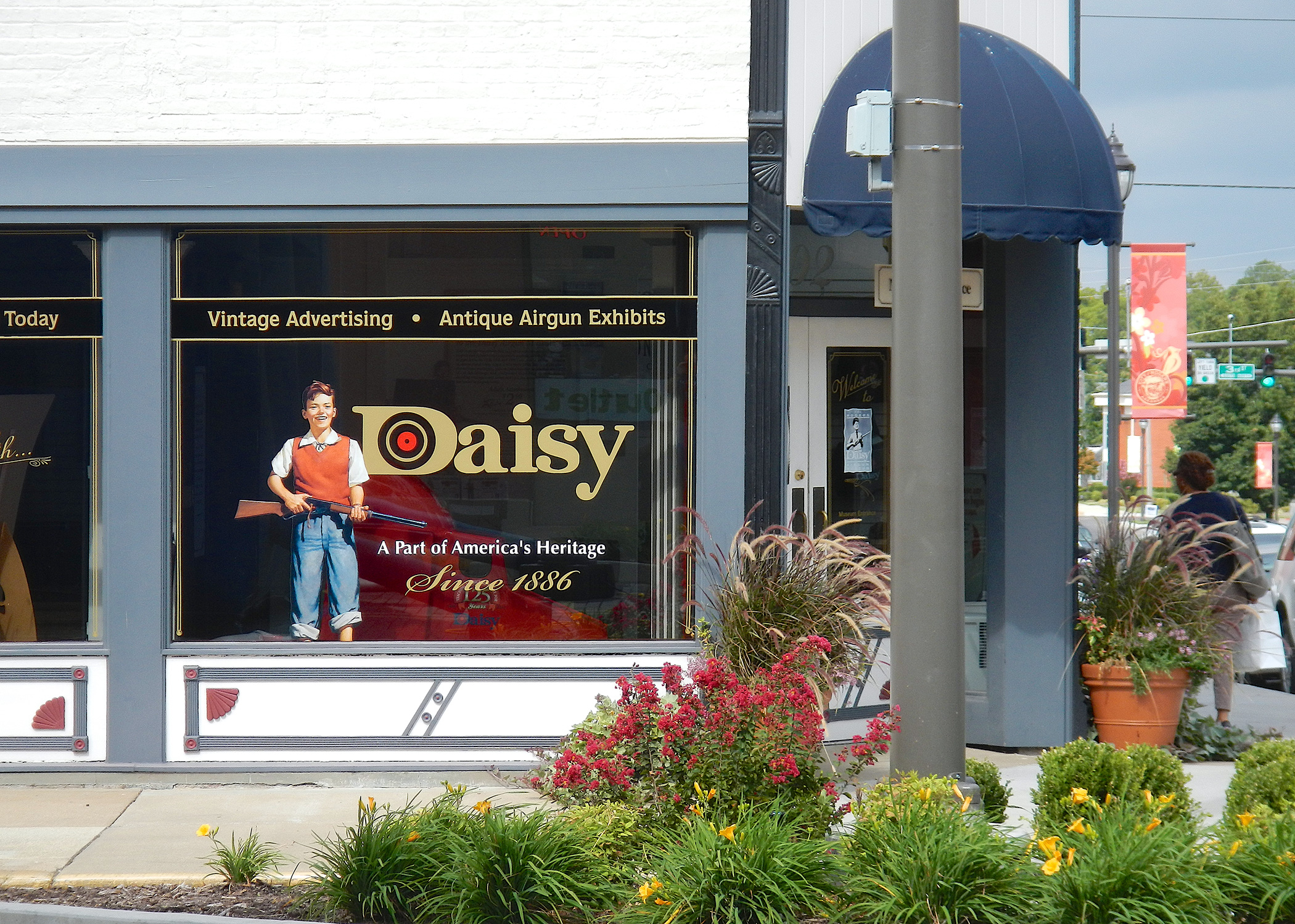
Daisy Airgun Museum in downtown Rogers

In addition to the Rogers Commercial Historic District, Rogers has numerous properties listed on the National Register of Historic Places, with the oldest being the Pea Ridge National Military Park. Rogers has two shopping malls: the Frisco Station Mall and the Pinnacle Hills Promenade.

=== Annual cultural events ===
Since 2007, Rogers has hosted the Walmart NW Arkansas Championship, a women's professional golf tournament on the LPGA Tour. The 54-hole event is held annually.

Rogers is also host to a Susan G. Komen Race for the Cure, the most widely known, largest and best-funded breast cancer organization in the United States.

=== Parks and recreation ===
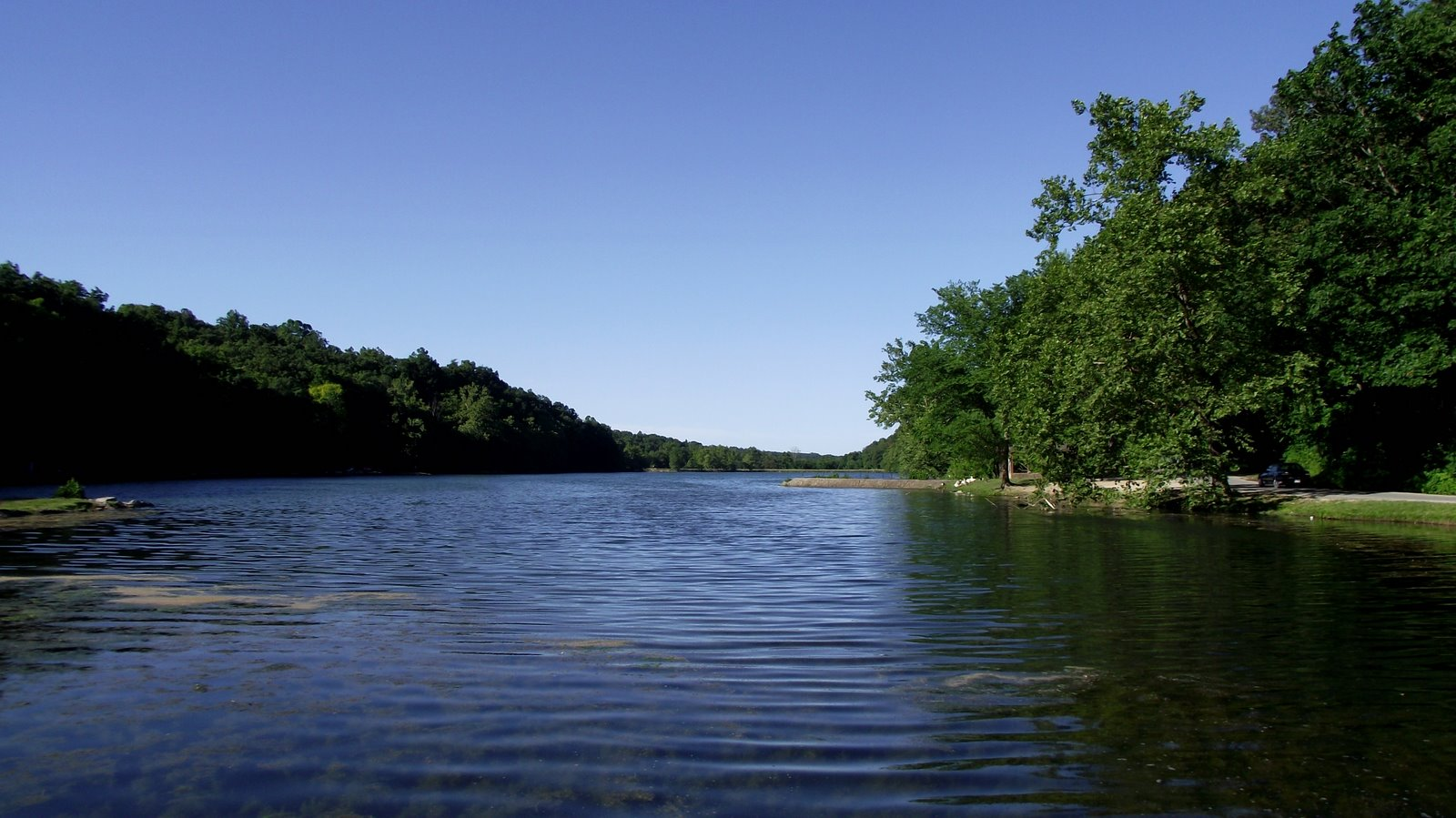
Lake Atalanta

Rogers has five large sports parks, 14 neighborhood parks, an aquatic center known as Rogers Aquatic Center, a skateboard and splash park, 26 athletic fields, an activity center, a YMCA, two lakes, five golf courses, and a trail system totaling over 23 miles (37 km). The NWA Razorback Regional Greenway is a 36-mile (58 km) primarily off-road shared-use trail that connects the region's trail systems to various community attractions. Foerster Park is home to the largest soccer program in the state.

Other recreational attractions in the surrounding area include Beaver Lake, Hobbs State Park – Conservation Area and War Eagle Mill & Cavern to the east of Rogers, as well as historical Civil War battlefield, Pea Ridge National Military Park, about 10 miles outside of Rogers.

=== Media ===
Rogers is served by the television market of Fort Smith and Fayetteville, Arkansas. The four major television stations are KFSM (CBS), KFTA (Fox), KHOG (ABC), and KNWA (NBC).

Radio stations in the city include:

- KAMO 94.3 FM
- KDUA 96.5 FM
- KHEL 97.3 FM
- KURM 790 AM & FM 100.3
- KXNA 104.9 FM
- KFFK 1390 AM

The daily newspaper in Rogers is the Rogers Morning News, with a special "A section" dedicated to news just for Rogers and surrounding cities. The rest of the newspaper is the Northwest Arkansas Democrat-Gazette, the Northwest Arkansas edition of the Arkansas Democrat-Gazette (the "B section" is the regular Democrat-Gazette "A section," complete with front page and masthead).

=== Sports ===
On July 12, 2023, the United Soccer League announced it had entered into a partnership with USL Arkansas to bring pro men's and women's soccer teams to Northwest Arkansas. Led by co-founders Chris Martinovic and Warren Smith, USL Arkansas plans to build a 5,000-seat multi-use stadium in Rogers, just north of the Pinnacle Hills Promenade. The men's team was projected to begin play in the USL Championship before the 2026 FIFA World Cup, while the women's team will begin play in the USL Super League in the fall of 2026, but those have been delayed due to a greater amount of support than expected, resulting in them having to restructure plans to accommodate all the support. The team will be called Ozark United FC.

== Government ==
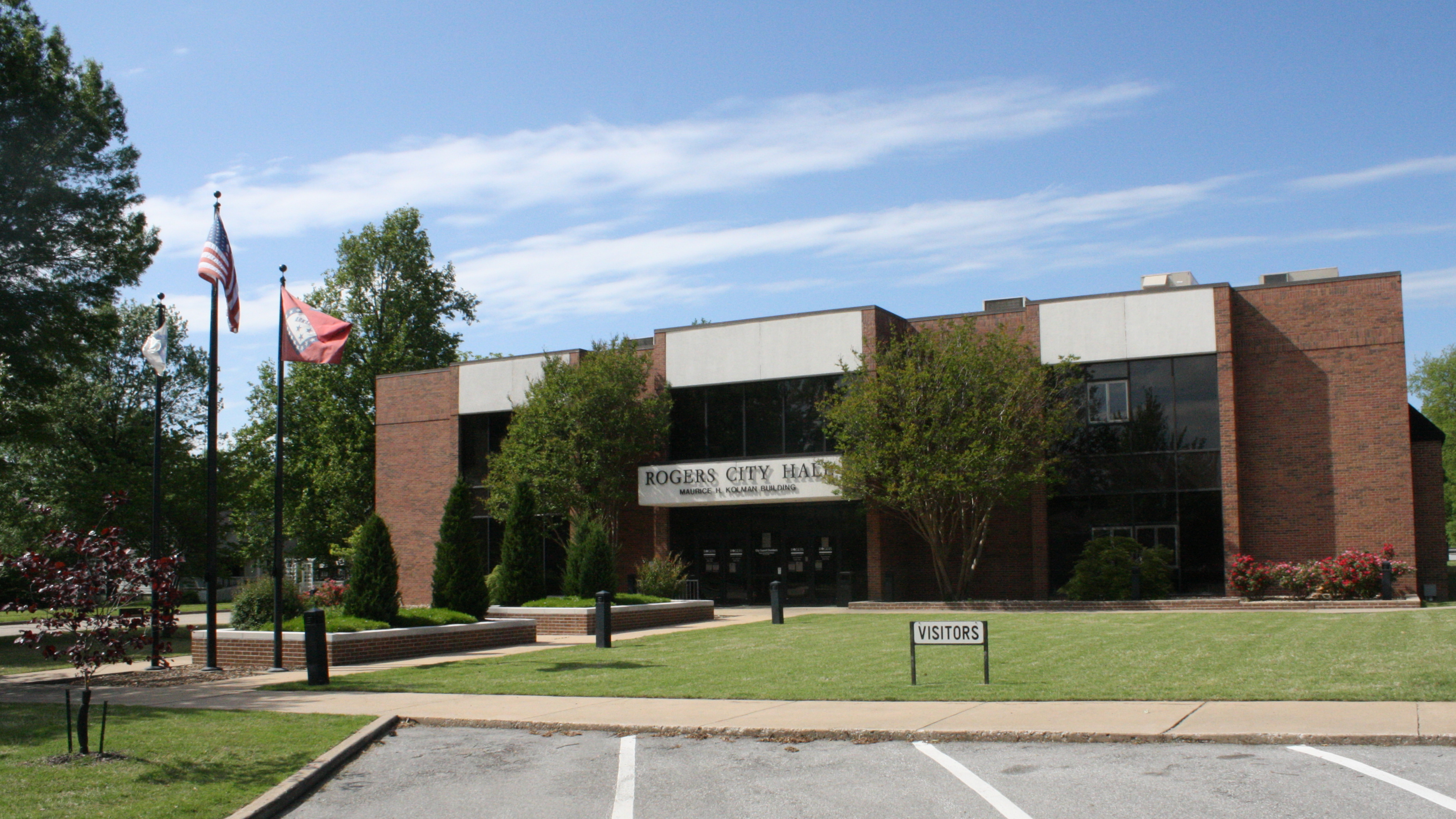
Rogers City Hall

Rogers operates within the mayor-city council form of government. The mayor is elected by a citywide election to serve as the chief executive officer (CEO) of the city by presiding over all city functions, policies, and ordinances. Once elected, the mayor also allocates duties to city employees. The Rogers mayoral election takes place during the United States presidential election. Mayors serve four-year terms and can serve unlimited terms. The city council is the unicameral legislative of the City, consisting of eight city council members. The council also balances the city's budget and passes ordinances. Two city council members are elected from each of the city's four wards. Since 2011, the mayor of Rogers has been Republican Greg Hines.

=== Law enforcement ===
The Rogers Police Department was established in 1881. As of 2022, it employs 120 sworn officers and 41 civilian employees.

=== Public safety ===
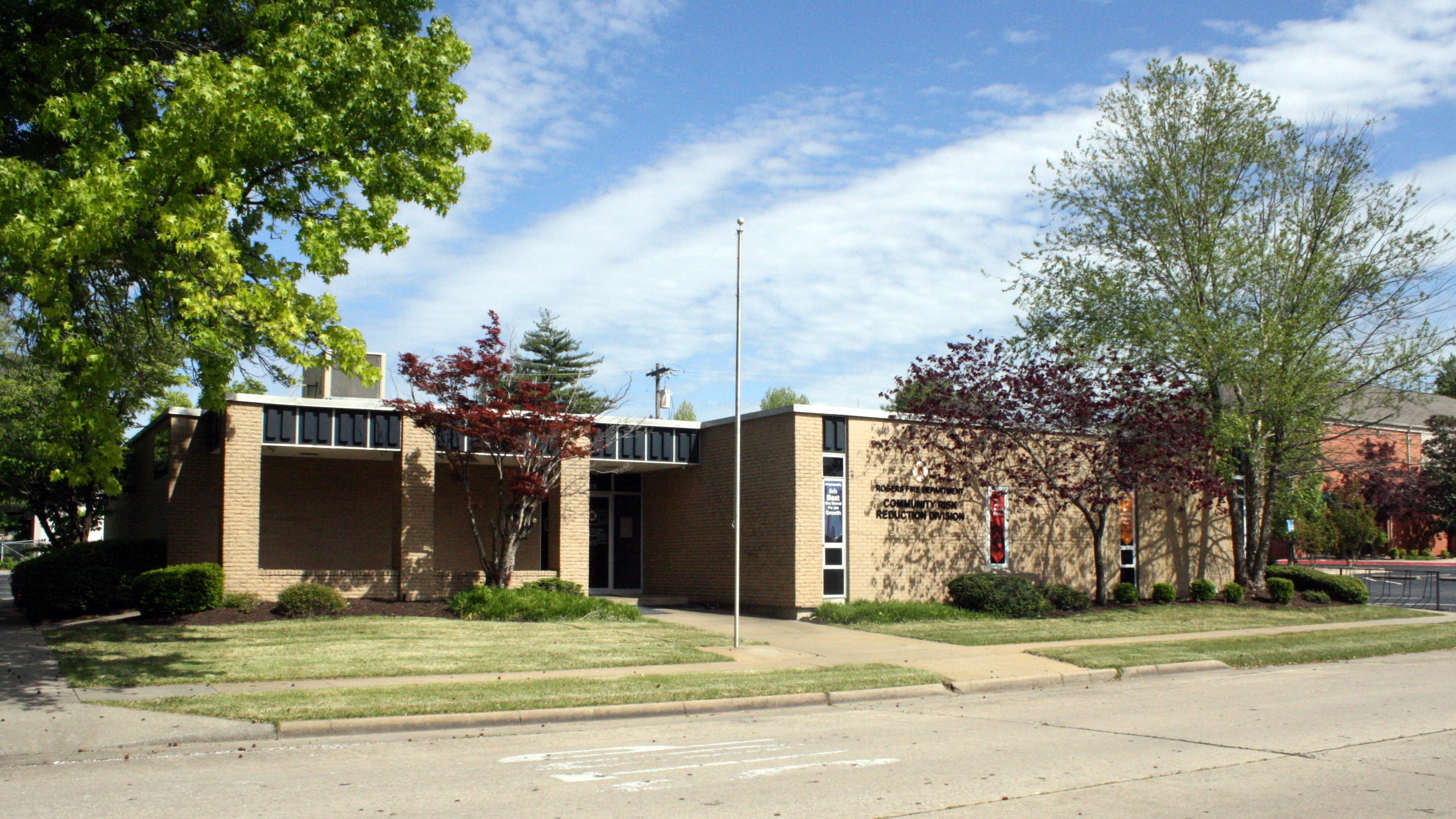
RFD Community Risk Reduction Division

The Rogers Police Department is the primary law enforcement agency in the city. The Rogers Fire Department is a career fire service; the Community Risk Reduction Division within RFD reviews development plans, conducts investigations, and provides fire safety education.

=== Politics ===
The previous mayor, Republican Steve Womack, won election to the United States House of Representatives in 2010 for the seat vacated by Republican John Boozman, now a U.S. senator.

== Education ==
=== Primary and secondary education ===
Rogers is home to several public and private school districts and schools including:

- Rogers School District, which serves the majority of the municipality - In 2012, 2013, & 2014, both Rogers and Rogers Heritage high schools were recognized with Silver awards from U.S. News & World Report Top 1,000 High Schools in America and were ranked among the top schools in the state. Additionally, for many years, Rogers High School has been ranked by Newsweek magazine among the top 1,300 schools in the country.
  - Rogers High School (RHS), slogan "Home of the Mountaineers", is Rogers' first high school, established in 1922. RHS, with about 2,000 students, is in the state's largest classification (7A).
  - Rogers Heritage High School (RHHS), Rogers' second high school, opened in August 2008. RHHS, with about 2,000 students, is in the state's largest classification (7A). Both RHS and RHHS offer the same courses and athletic opportunities.
  - Rogers New Technology High School (RNTHS) opened in 2013 and is part of the New Tech Network. Like more than 120 New Tech schools around the country, the Rogers school features an instructional approach centered on project-based learning and integrated technology in the classroom.
- Portions of Rogers to the west are within the boundary of Bentonville Public Schools
- Arkansas Arts Academy High School is a public charter school supported by the Arkansas Arts Academy district.
- St. Vincent de Paul is a private Catholic school of the Roman Catholic Diocese of Little Rock, the largest private school in Rogers. The nearest Catholic high school is Ozark Catholic Academy in Tontitown.

=== Higher education ===
Postsecondary education within the city's boundaries have included campuses for the University of Phoenix and Bryan College (no longer operating).

Other nearby schools and campuses include the University of Arkansas (Fayetteville), Northwest Arkansas Community College (Bentonville), and John Brown University (a Christian school in Siloam Springs).

== Infrastructure ==
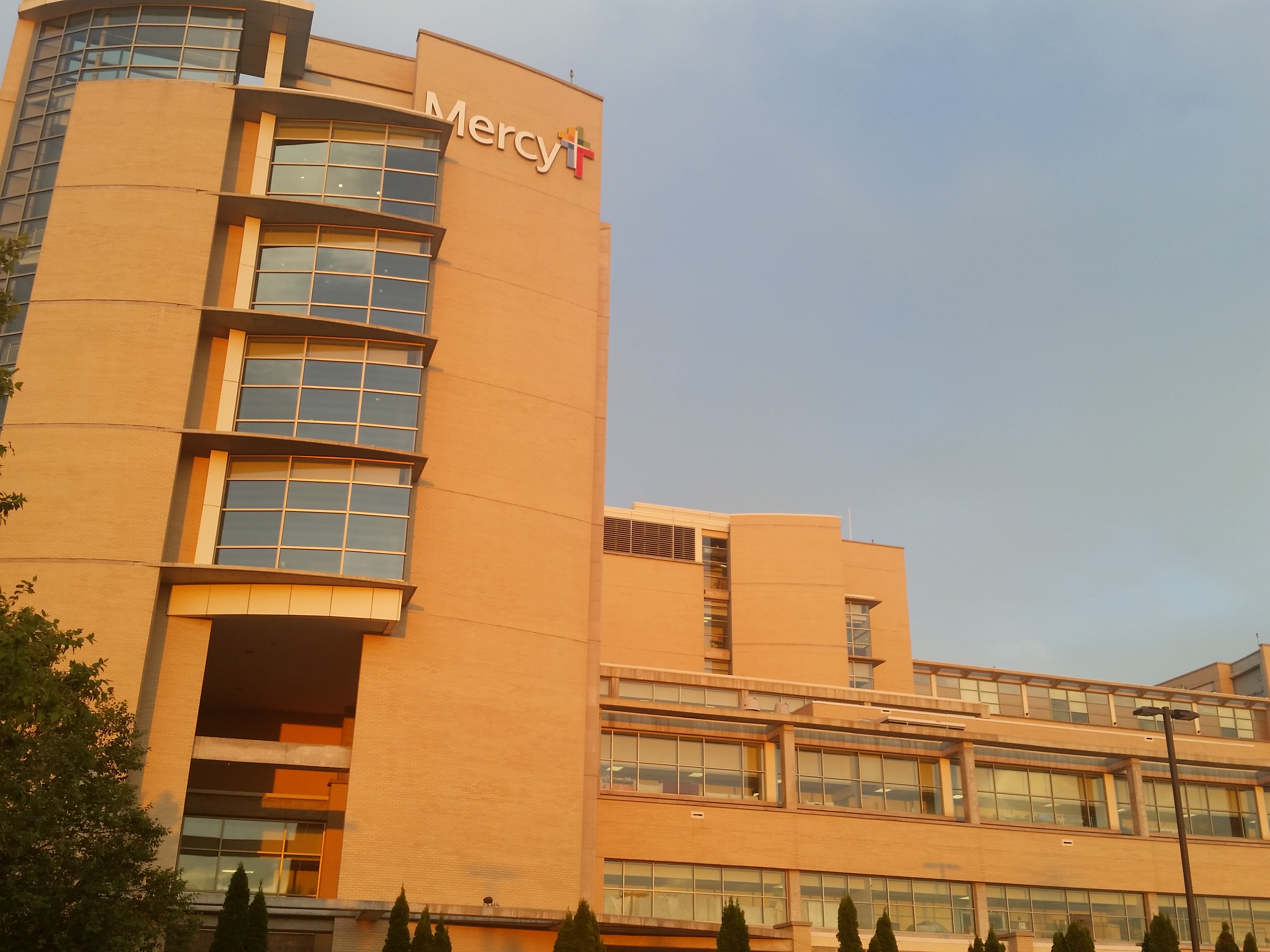
Mercy Hospital in Rogers, Arkansas

=== Aviation ===
Rogers Municipal Airport (ROG), also known as Carter Field, is home to Walmart's air fleet. All commercial aviation, however, goes through the Northwest Arkansas National Airport (XNA), located about 15 miles west of Rogers in Highfill.

=== Transit ===
Ozark Regional Transit provides fixed-route and dial-a-ride transit services in Rogers.

The nearest intercity bus service is provided by Jefferson Lines in nearby Fayetteville.

=== Highways ===
- Interstate 49
- U.S. Route 62
- U.S. Route 71 Business
- U.S. Route 71
- Arkansas Highway 12
- Arkansas Highway 94

=== Utilities ===
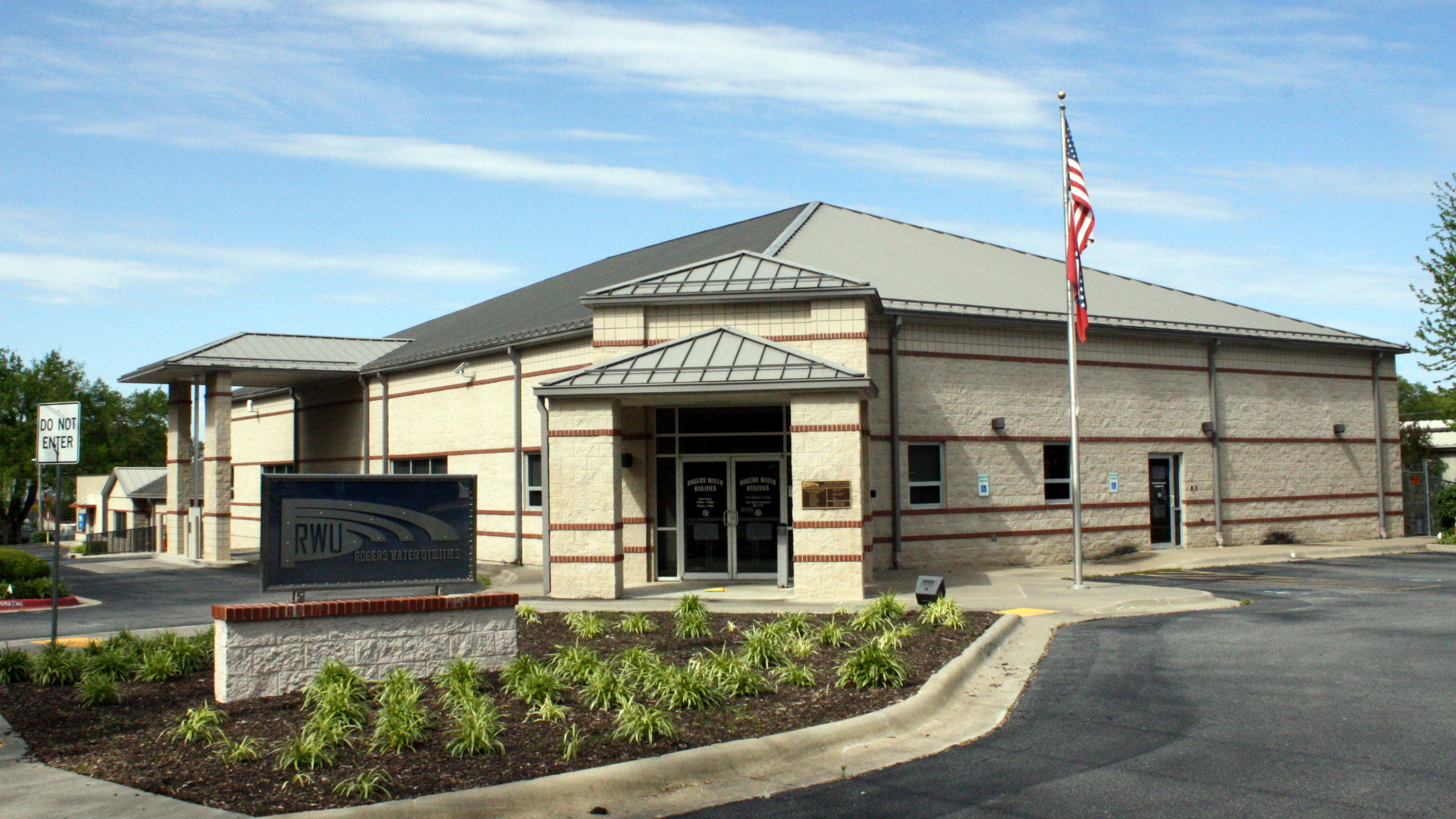
Rogers Water Utilities administration office

The City of Rogers' public water distribution and sanitary sewer collection systems are owned and operated by Rogers Water Utilities (RWU), which is overseen by the Rogers Water Utilities Commission. RWU purchases treated potable water from Beaver Water District, whose source is Beaver Lake. RWU served a retail population of 70878 as of 2019, making it one of the largest water utilities in the state. Wastewater is collected and treated at the Rogers Pollution Control Facility on the west side of the city.

== Notable people ==
- Sarah Austin (entrepreneur) (born 1986), author, tech entrepreneur and YouTuber
- Cecile Bledsoe (born 1944), Arkansas state senator from Rogers
- John Boozman (born 1950), U.S. senator
- Jim R. Caldwell (born 1936), the first Republican member of the Arkansas State Senate in the 20th century
- Craig Colorusso (born 1970), artist currently living in Rogers
- Matt Cornett (born 1998), actor born in Rogers
- Ryan Hale (born 1975), American football player
- Britt McKenzie, member of the Arkansas House of Representatives
- Thomas P. Morgan (1864–1928), humorist
- James C. Nance, Oklahoma community newspaper publisher and Speaker of the Oklahoma House of Representatives
- Joe Nichols (born 1976), country music artist born in Rogers
- Vernon Oxford (1941–2023), country singer born in Rogers
- Titanic Thompson (1892–1974), gambler and golfer, grew up in Rogers
- Sam Walton (1918–1992), founder of Walmart, established the first Walmart in Rogers in 1962
- Steve Womack, mayor of Rogers and U.S. representative for Arkansas's 3rd congressional district

== See also ==
- Arkansas Highway 102 (1985–2007), former state highway in Rogers
- Lake Atalanta
- Walmart Arkansas Music Pavilion
