= Highfill School (No. 71) =

- U.S. National Register of Historic Places
- Location within Arkansas Location within the United States
- Location: 11978 Highfill Ave., Highfill, Arkansas
- Coordinates: 36°15′30″N 94°21′02″W
- Area: less than one acre
- Built: c. 1911
- NRHP reference No.: 100001991
- Added to NRHP: January 26, 2018

The Highfill Community Center, formerly the Highfill School, is a historic school building at 11978 Highfill Avenue in Highfill, Arkansas, at its northeast corner with 4th Street. It is a single-story frame structure, finished with wooden clapboard siding and a hip roof. The main entrance is on one of the short sides, sheltered by a hipped hood and flanked by sash windows. The building was constructed about 1911 to serve as a school for district 71, which covered the town. The school was consolidated into the system of nearby Gentry in 1948, and the building was retained for use as a community center, a role it continues to play today.

It may be a one-room schoolhouse.

The building was listed on the National Register of Historic Places in 2018.

== See also ==
- National Register of Historic Places listings in Benton County, Arkansas
