= Carl House =

Historic house in Arkansas, United States

- U.S. National Register of Historic Places
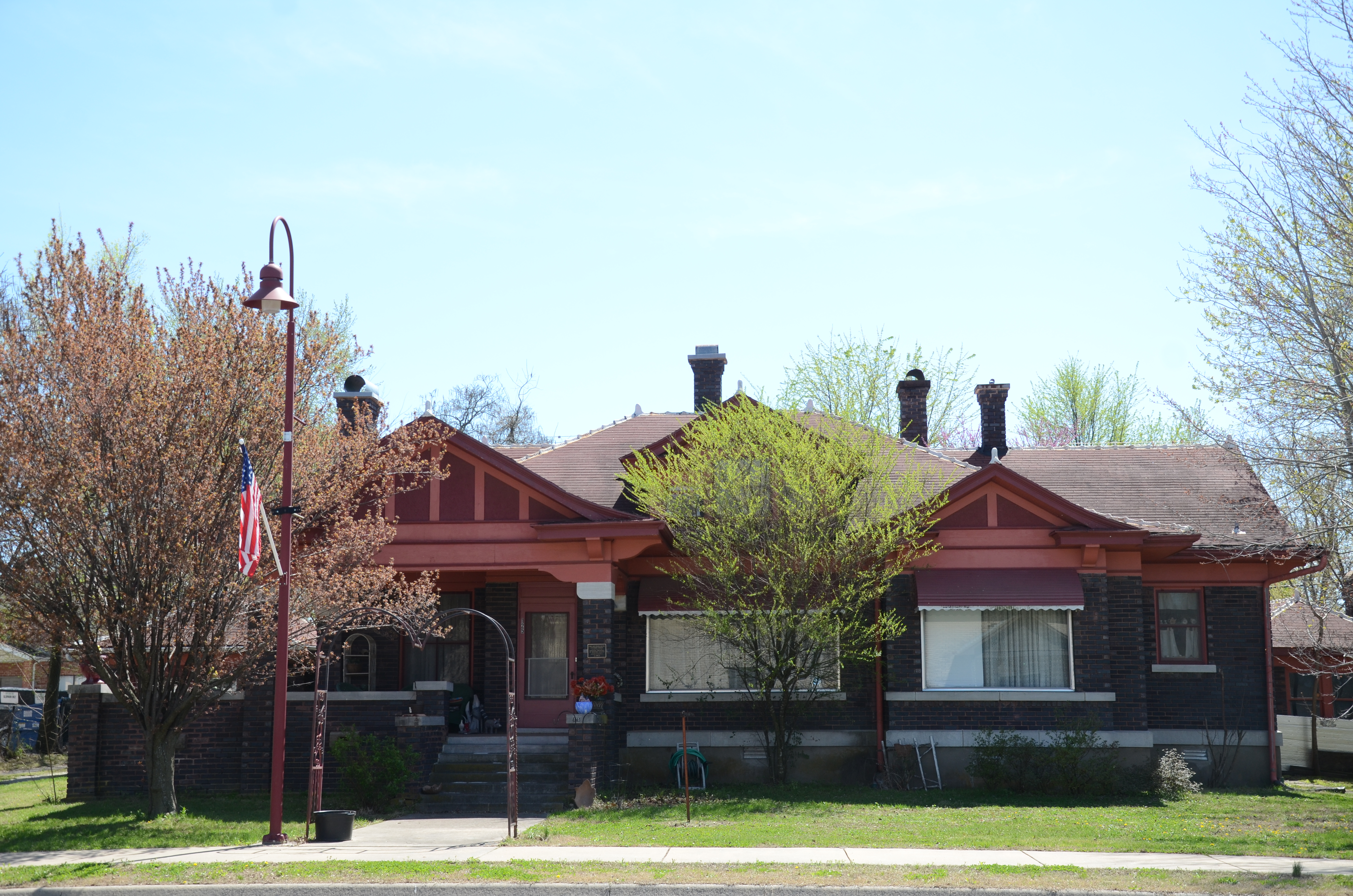

- Location within Arkansas Location within the United States
- Location: 70 Main St., Gentry, Arkansas
- Coordinates: 36°16′2″N 94°29′6″W
- Area: less than one acre
- Built: 1913
- Architectural style: Bungalow/craftsman
- MPS: Benton County MRA
- NRHP reference No.: 87002422
- Added to NRHP: January 28, 1988

The Carl House is a historic house at 70 Main Street in Gentry, Arkansas. It is a 1 1/2-story brick building with a flared hip roof and an array of hip-roof and gabled dormers. Its front porch is supported by square brick columns, and its gable is decorated with half-timbering, as are other gable ends. The house was built in 1913 by R. H. Carl, president of a local bank, and is a fine local example of Craftsman/Bungalow architecture. Located on Main Street, the fine architectural details such as the sweep of the roof, the coping around the porch, the irregular plan and the matching ancillaries grab the attention of all who pass.

The house was listed on the National Register of Historic Places in 1988.

== See also ==
- National Register of Historic Places listings in Benton County, Arkansas
