= Wasson House =

Historic house in Arkansas, United States

- U.S. National Register of Historic Places
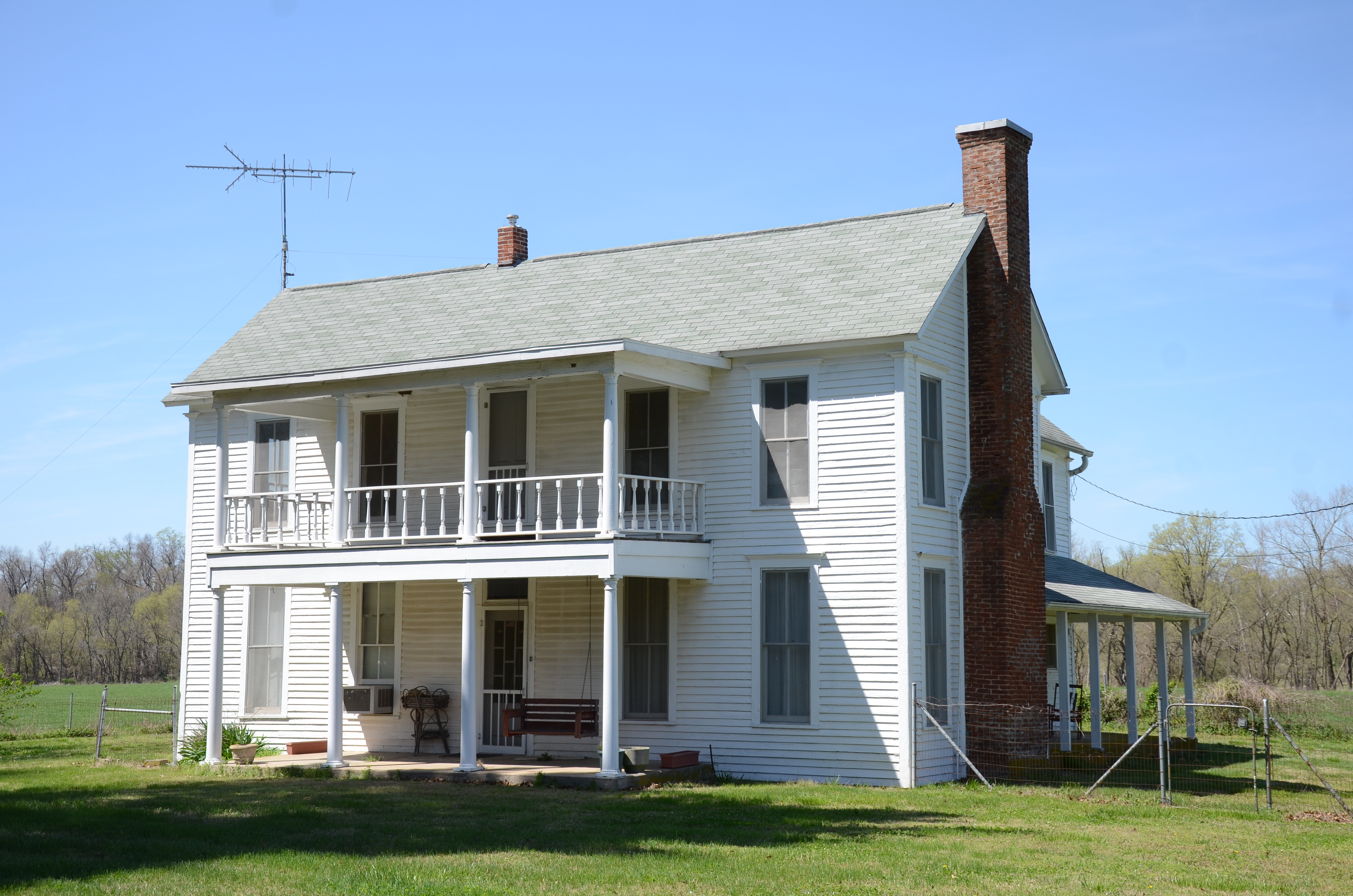

- Location within Arkansas Location within the United States
- Location: Main St., Springtown, Arkansas
- Coordinates: 36°15′37″N 94°25′30″W
- Area: less than one acre
- Built: 1890
- MPS: Benton County MRA
- NRHP reference No.: 87002371
- Added to NRHP: January 28, 1988

The Wasson House is a historic house on Main Street in Springtown, Arkansas. It is a well-preserved example of an I-house, built c. 1890. It is five bays wide, with a side gable roof, and a two-story porch, supported by Tuscan columns, extending across the center three bays, with a latticework balustrade at the second level. A two-story ell extends to the rear, and there is a period brick combination well house/smoke house nearby. Both the interior and exterior retain significant original woodwork and other design elements.

The house was listed on the National Register of Historic Places in 1988.

== See also ==
- National Register of Historic Places listings in Benton County, Arkansas
