= Railroad Cottage =

Historic house in Arkansas, United States

- U.S. National Register of Historic Places
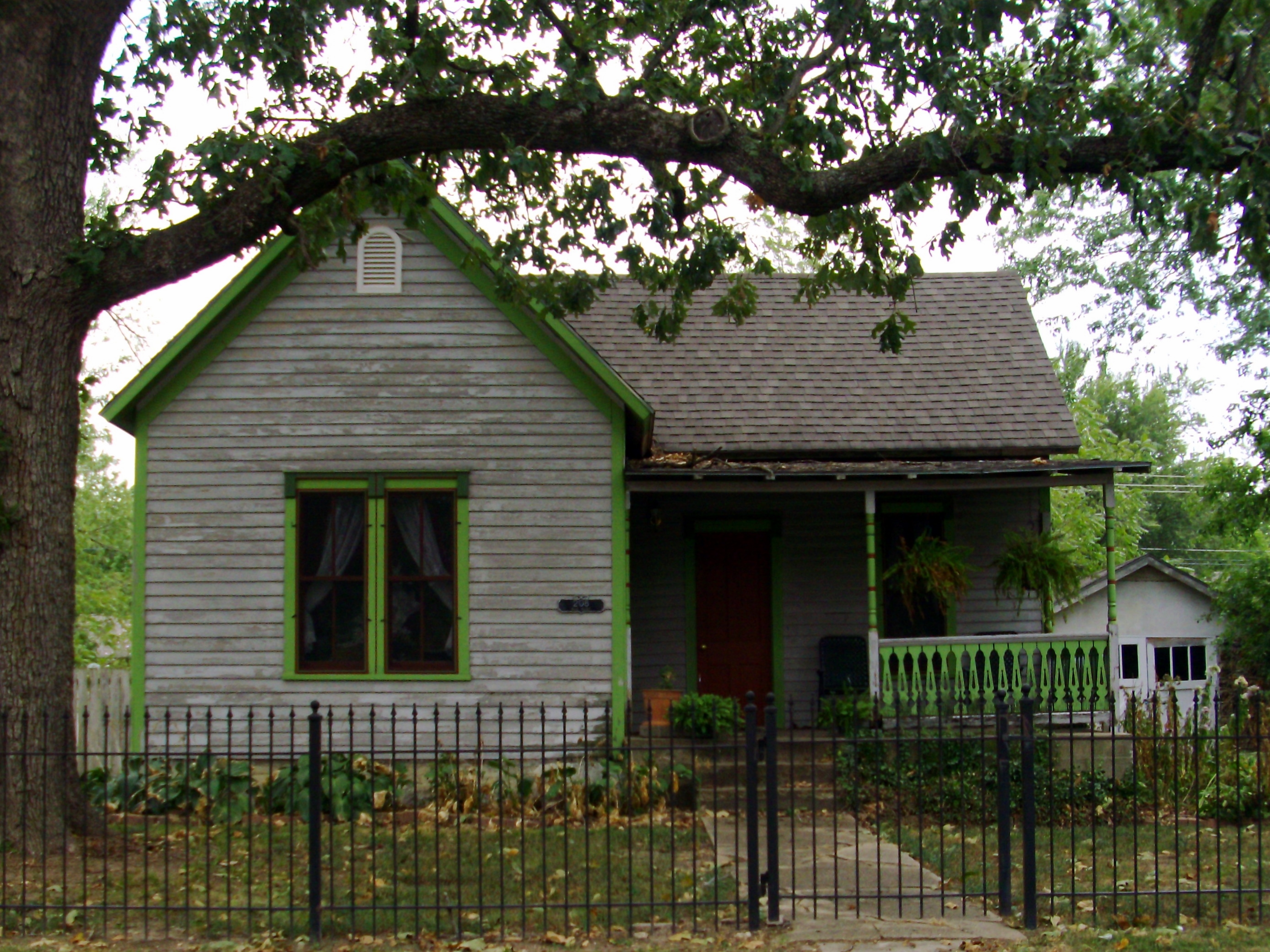

- Location within Arkansas Location within the United States
- Location: 208 N. Rust, Gentry, Arkansas
- Coordinates: 36°16′16″N 94°29′1″W
- Area: less than one acre
- Built: 1900
- Architectural style: Late Victorian
- NRHP reference No.: 04001509
- Added to NRHP: January 19, 2005

The Railroad Cottage is a historic house at 208 North Rust Street in Gentry, Arkansas. It is a small single-story L-shaped wood-frame house with Folk Victorian styling, including a reconstructed jigsawn balustrade and turned porch posts. The house was built c. 1900, and is one of the best-preserved small houses built at the time to support an influx of people working in the fruit and railroad industries. Buried under a series of 20th-century alterations, the core of the house was discovered when demolition of the building began in 1997, and has been carefully restored as best architectural preservation practices could determine its original appearance to be.

The building was listed on the National Register of Historic Places in 2005.

== See also ==
- National Register of Historic Places listings in Benton County, Arkansas
