= Gentry High School =

Gentry High School may refer to:

- Gentry High School (Arkansas) - Gentry, Arkansas
- Gentry High School (Mississippi) - Indianola, Mississippi
