= Gentry Grand Army of the Republic Monument =

- Gentry Grand Army of the Republic Memorial
- U.S. National Register of Historic Places
- Location within Arkansas Location within the United States
- Location: NE Sec. of Gentry Cemetery, Pioneer Ln., Gentry, Arkansas
- Coordinates: 36°15′14″N 94°29′39″W
- Area: less than one acre
- Built: 1918
- Architectural style: Classical Revival
- NRHP reference No.: 100001990
- Added to NRHP: January 26, 2016

The Gentry Grand Army of the Republic Memorial is an American Civil War monument in the northeast section of Gentry Cemetery in Gentry, Arkansas. It is a limestone structure with Classical Revival features, consisting of a stepped square base, a tier of marble panels framed by round columns, and a tapered obelisk topped by a carved capital and round knob. Two of the marble panels are inscribed with the names of soldiers who served in the Union Army. The monument was installed in 1918 through the efforts of David Kost, a Civil War veteran who organized Gentry's chapter of the Grand Army of the Republic (GAR). It is one of a relatively small number of GAR memorials in the state (as compared to a larger number of Confederate memorials).

The monument was listed on the National Register of Historic Places in 2016.

== See also ==
- National Register of Historic Places listings in Benton County, Arkansas
