= Siloam Springs Lake =

Arkansas lake

Coordinates: 36.225148°N 94.538641°W

- City Lake
- Location within Arkansas
- Location: Benton County, Arkansas, US
- Primary inflows: Flint Creek
- Primary outflows: Illinois River

Siloam Springs Lake, also known as City Lake, is located about 3 miles north of central Siloam Springs in Benton County, Arkansas. It is fed by Flint Creek, a stream that forms around Springtown, Arkansas and flows generally southwest into Oklahoma. The creek eventually flows into the Illinois River. Normally the creek is crystal clear and flows year-round.

Popular fish caught in Siloam Springs Lake include carp, rock bass, sunfish, catfish, yellow bass, largemouth bass and bream/bluegill.

The lake is owned by the City of Siloam Springs. It is part of the 165-acre City Lake Park. The master plan for the park, approved in December 2016, includes stacked loops of walking and cycling trails over a variety of topography and ecological systems.
