= Flint Creek (Arkansas/Oklahoma) =

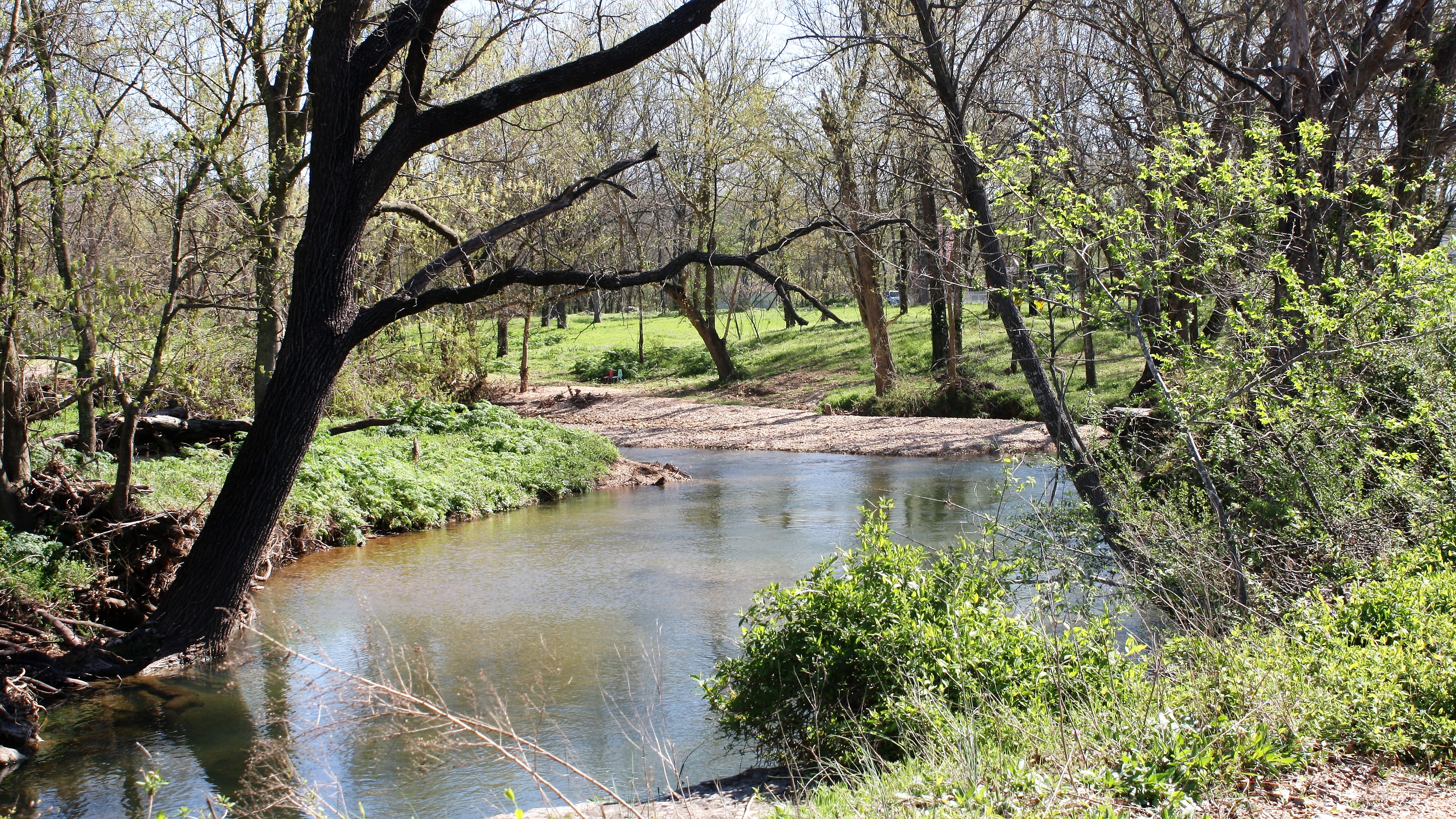
- Flint Creek in Springtown, Arkansas

Location
- Country: United States

Physical characteristics
- Source
  - location: Springtown, Arkansas
  - coordinates: 36°15′43″N 94°25′28″W
- Mouth: Illinois River
  - location: Flint Creek, Oklahoma
  - coordinates: 36°10′29″N 94°43′15″W

Flint Creek is a stream that forms in Arkansas and flows generally southwest into Oklahoma. It originates around Springtown, Arkansas, and is impounded at Siloam Springs Lake, north of Siloam Springs, Arkansas, before crossing the Oklahoma border. The creek eventually flows into the Illinois River on the eastern boundary of the town of Flint Creek, Oklahoma. Normally the creek is crystal clear and flows year-round.

== See also ==
- Little Flint Creek
