= Little Flint Creek =

River in Arkansas

Location
- Country: United States

Physical characteristics
- Source
  - location: northeast of Gentry, Arkansas
- Mouth: Flint Creek
  - location: north-northwest of Siloam Springs, Arkansas
  - coordinates: 36°13′26″N 94°33′57″W

Little Flint Creek is a stream in Benton County, Arkansas. It forms northeast of Gentry, and flows generally southwest to become a tributary of Flint Creek to the north-northwest of Siloam Springs. It was impounded in the 1975-1978 timeframe to form Lake Flint Creek, a 500-acre reservoir that provides cooling water to the Flint Creek Power Plant as well as fishing to the general public.

Flint Creek goes on to flow into Oklahoma, eventually joining the Illinois River.
