= Ozark Adventist Academy =

Ozark Adventist Academy (OAA)
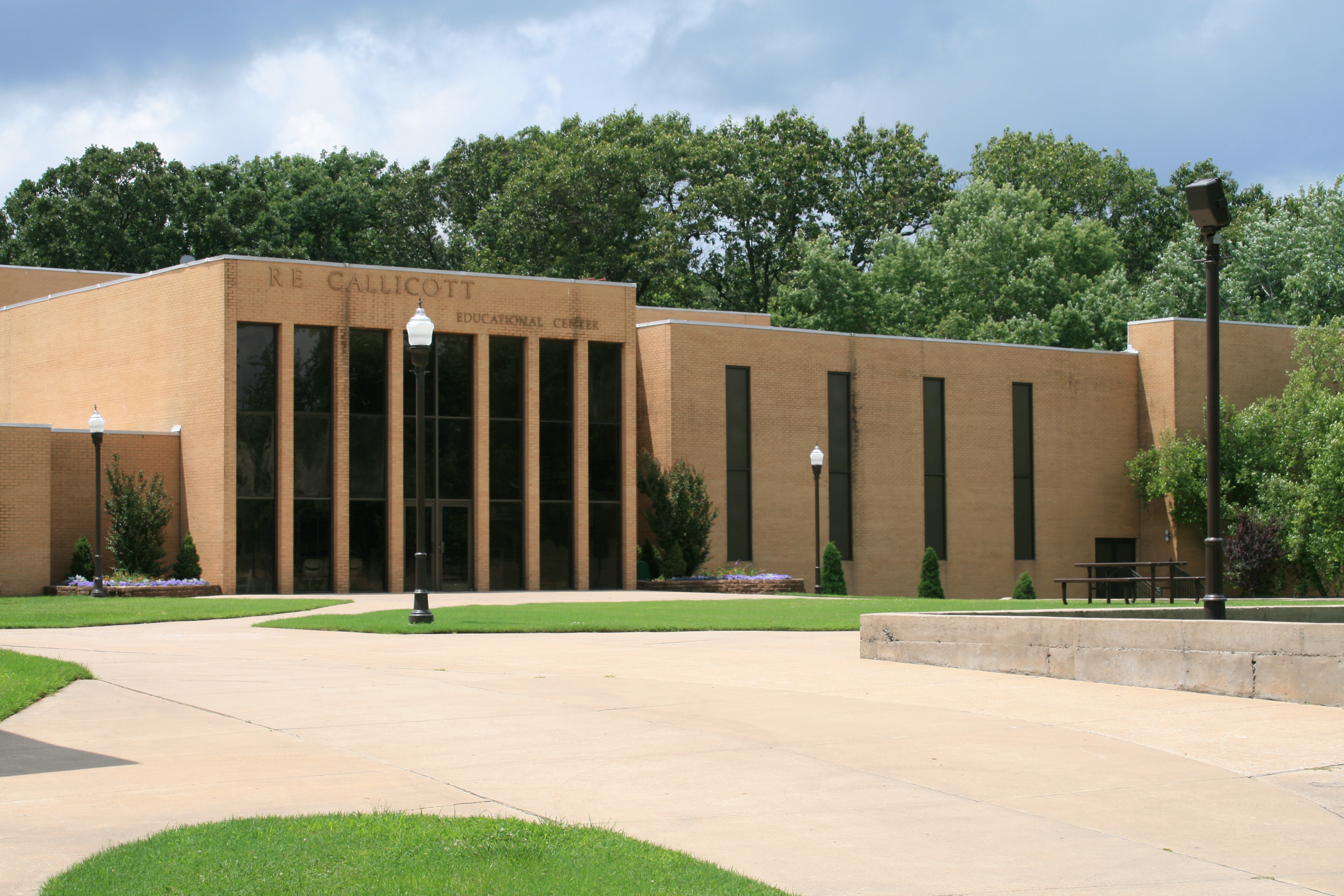

Location
- 20997 Dawn Hill East Road; Gentry, Arkansas 72734; United States; 36°14′18″N 94°29′57″W

Information
- School type: Christian Private
- CEEB code: 040880
- NCES School ID: 00048971
- Principal: Beth Zeiss
- Grades: 9–12
- Enrollment: 130 (2026)
- Language: English and Spanish
- Colors: Blue and gray
- Mascot: Skeeter The Skyhawk
- Team name: Skyhawks
- Yearbook: The Flintonian
- Affiliation: Seventh-day Adventist Church
- Website: www.ozarkacademy.org

Ozark Adventist Academy (OAA) is a private, co-educational, college preparatory boarding school located near Gentry, Arkansas, United States. It is a part of the Seventh-day Adventist education system, the world's second largest Christian school system.

== See also ==
- List of Seventh-day Adventist secondary schools
- Seventh-day Adventist education
