= Gentry School District =

School district based in Gentry, Arkansas, United States

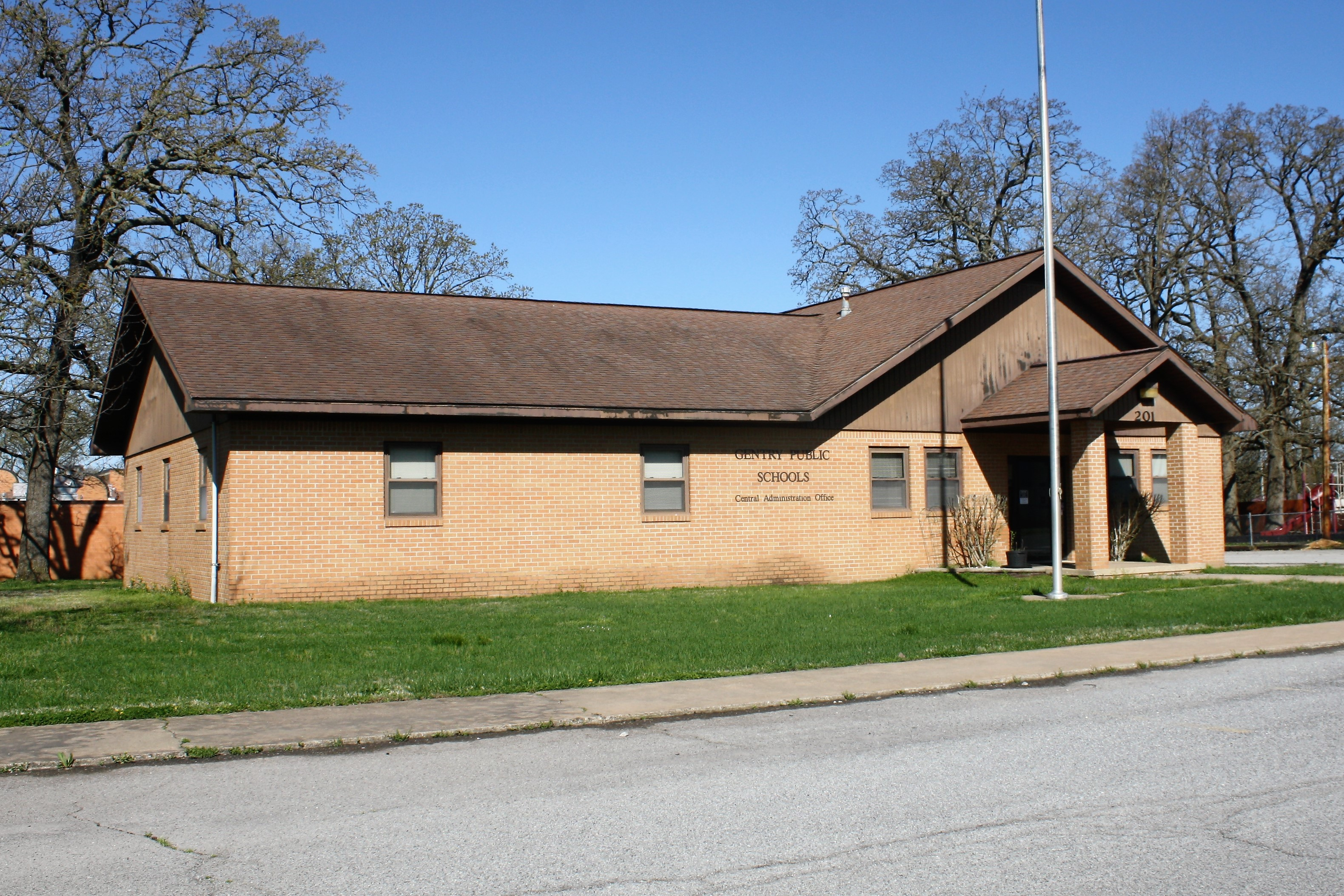

Location
- 201 S Giles Avenue; Gentry, Arkansas 72734 United States

District information
- Grades: PK–12
- Established: Randy C. Barrett, Ed.D.
- Superintendent: Dr. Tyler Broyles, Ed.D
- Accreditations: ADE; AdvancED
- Schools: 4
- NCES District ID: 0506540

Students and staff
- Students: 1,431
- Teachers: 110.46 (on FTE basis)
- Staff: 211.46 (on FTE basis)
- Student–teacher ratio: 12.95
- Athletic conference: 4A Region 1 (2012–14)
- District mascot: Pioneer
- Colors: Maroon; White

Other information
- Website: www.gentrypioneers.com

Gentry School District 19 (GSD) is a school district based in Gentry, Arkansas, United States. GSD supports more than 1,400 students in kindergarten through grade 12 and employs more than 220 faculty and staff on a full time equivalent basis for its four schools.

The school district encompasses 85.62 square miles (221.8 km^{2}) of land in Benton County.

The district includes the vast majority of Gentry, all of Cherokee City and Springtown, and western portions of Highfill.

Competitive sports programs include football, baseball, fast-pitch softball, men and women's basketball and soccer, bowling, cross country, wrestling, cheer, golf, volleyball, and track teams, Odyssey of The Mind, Robotics, Competitive Gaming. They also have Fine Arts including but not limited to Choir, Theater, Drama, Art, Music, and appreciation classes for both art and music.

== Schools ==
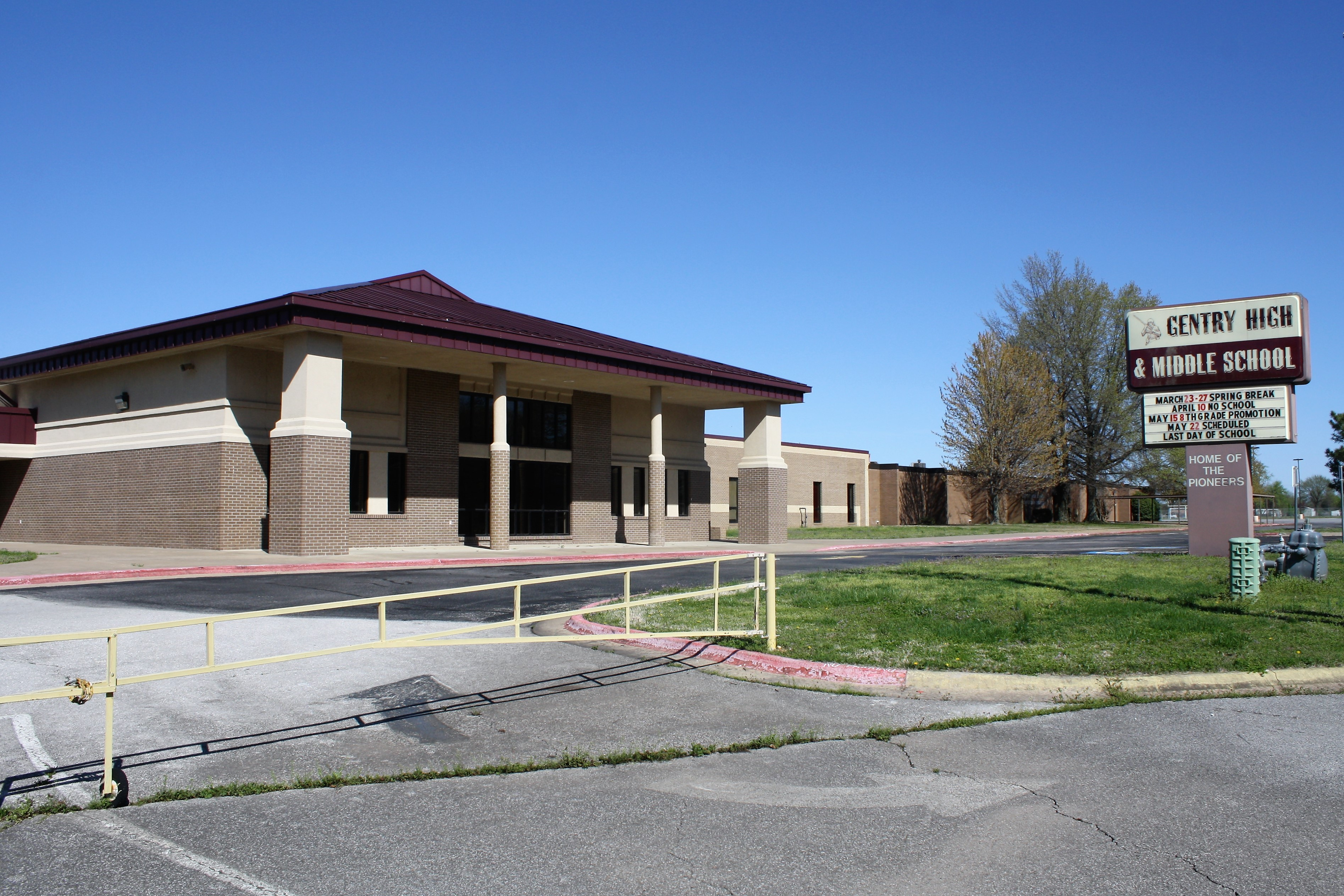
Gentry High School and Gentry Middle School

Secondary schools

- Gentry High School, serving grades 9 through 12.
- Gentry Middle School, serving grades 6 through 8.

Elementary schools

- Gentry Intermediate School, serving grades 3 through 5.
- Gentry Primary School, serving kindergarten through grade 2.
