= Lake Flint Creek =

Arkansas lake

Coordinates: 36.250865°N 94.533696°W

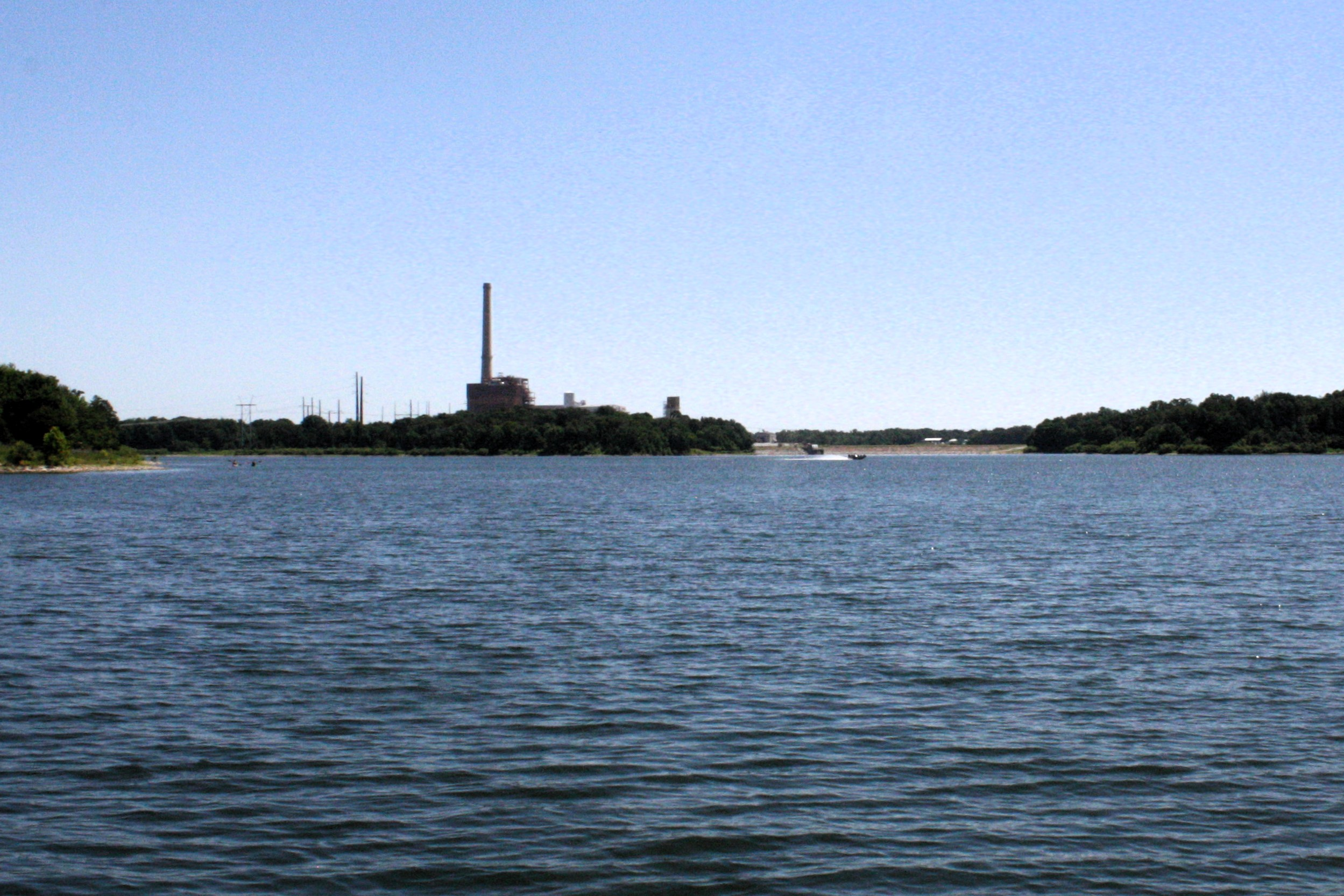

Location
- Country: United States
- State: Arkansas
- City: Siloam Springs

Lake Flint Creek, also known as SWEPCO Lake, is located about five miles north of the City of Siloam Springs in Benton County, Arkansas. It was made by constructing a 100’ high dam on Little Flint Creek in the 1975-1978 timeframe, creating a lake of about 500 acres.

The lake is owned by Southwestern Electric Power Company (SWEPCO), which built it to provide cooling water to its Flint Creek Power Plant. Water flows back into the lake at 100 degrees Fahrenheit, which in turn provides a warmer water environment for fish than most Arkansas lakes. SWEPCO allows public access to the lake, and the surroundings include a boat ramp. The Arkansas Game & Fish Commission promotes fishing there through stocking and helping to build fish habitat. Fish species include Florida largemouth bass as well as Northern largemouth bass.
