= Siloam Springs High School =

Location
- 700 North Progress Ave. Siloam Springs, Arkansas 72761; United States; 36°11′27″N 94°30′50″W

Information
- Motto: Changing Lives through Educational Excellence
- Status: Open
- School district: Siloam Springs School District
- NCES District ID: 0512450
- Oversight: Arkansas Department of Education (ADE)
- CEEB code: 042280
- NCES School ID: 051245001003
- Principal: Dr. Karin Miller
- Teaching staff: 113.02 (on FTE basis)
- Grades: 9–12
- Enrollment: 1,449 (2023-2024)
- Student to teacher ratio: 12.82
- Education system: ADE Smart Core curriculum
- Classes offered: Regular, Advanced Placement
- Campus type: Rural
- Colors: Maroon and gray
- Athletics conference: 6A West
- Mascot: Panthers
- Team name: Siloam Springs Panthers
- USNWR ranking: No. 22 (AR); No. 1,994 (USA)
- Feeder schools: Siloam Springs Middle School
- Affiliation: Arkansas Activities Association (AAA)
- Website: www.siloamschools.com/o/hs

Siloam Springs High School is a comprehensive public high school for grades nine through twelve serving the community of Siloam Springs, Arkansas, United States. Located in the foothill of the Ozark Mountains and within the Fayetteville–Springdale–Rogers Metropolitan Area, Siloam Springs High School is the sole high school managed in Benton County by the Siloam Springs School District.

In addition to Siloam Springs, the district includes all of Cincinnati, and a small section of Gentry.

== History ==
With community support, the new Siloam Springs High School opened in August 2011 serving about 1,200 ninth through twelfth grade students. Siloam Springs High School has a continued partnership with nearby John Brown University located in Siloam Springs.

== Curriculum ==
The assumed course of study at Siloam Springs High School is the Smart Core curriculum developed by the Arkansas Department of Education (ADE). Students engage in regular and Advanced Placement (AP) coursework and exams to obtain at least 22 units before graduation. Exceptional students have been recognized as National Merit Finalists and participated in Arkansas Governor's School. Students who qualify may seek participation in the Arkansas School for Mathematics, Sciences, and the Arts (ASMSA), Model United Nations, Media Festival, Odyssey of the Mind, and student competitions and festivals beyond the local district.

Students at Siloam Springs High School also have an option to enroll in the Siloam Springs Virtual Academy. Enrollment in SSVA begins in the spring semester of the preceding year.

== Athletics ==
The Siloam Springs High School mascot is the panther, and black and maroon serve as the school colors.

For the 2024–2026 seasons, the Siloam Springs Panthers participate in the state's second largest classification (6A) within the 6A West Conference. The 6A West Conference consists of Lake Hamilton, Greenwood, Shiloh Christian, Mountain Home, FS Southside, Russellville, Siloam Springs, and Van Buren. Competition is primarily sanctioned by the Arkansas Activities Association with the Panthers competing in baseball, basketball (boys/girls), bowling, competitive cheer, cross country, debate, football, golf (boys/girls), soccer (boys/girls), softball, swimming (boys/girls), tennis (boys/girls, track and field, and volleyball.

The boys' cross country team has captured eight state championships between 1997 and 2009. In 2001, the girls' volleyball team won its first of seven state championships, followed by a state-record six consecutive titles (2004–2009). The men's swimming and diving team won the 3A state championship in 1990. The girls' swimming and diving team has won two consecutive state championships (1982, 1983), followed by the boys' soccer championship (2011, 2012). Siloam Springs boasts the 2011 NSCAA Arkansas Boys High School Player of the Year award winner. The boys' bowling team won the 2011 7A state championship. The boys' basketball team also won the 5A state tournament in 2008. The girls' tennis team won the 5A state championship in 2005.

== Notable alumni ==
- Duncan Baird (class of 1997), member of the Arkansas House of Representatives for District 96 in Benton County
- Roger Jackson (class of 2008), professional football player.
- Jon Woods (class of 1996), musician, member of Arkansas State Senate (2013 through 2016); Arkansas House of Representatives (2007 through 2012)
