= Coon Creek Bridge =

- U.S. National Register of Historic Places
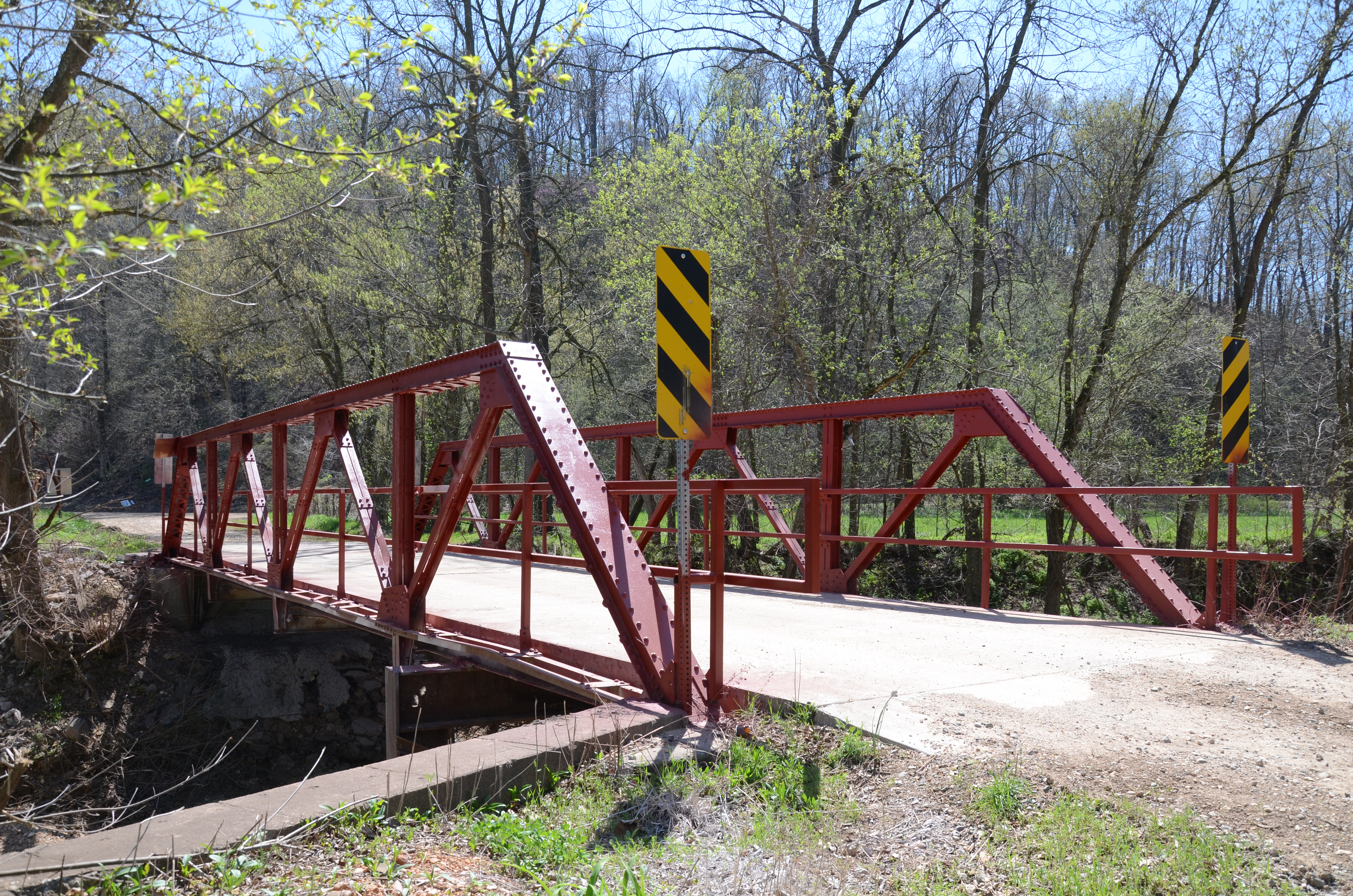

- Location within Arkansas Location within the United States
- Nearest city: Cherokee City, Arkansas
- Coordinates: 36.3231°N 94.554°W
- Area: less than one acre
- Built: 1930
- Architectural style: Warren Pony Truss
- MPS: Historic Bridges of Arkansas MPS
- NRHP reference No.: 06001264
- Added to NRHP: January 24, 2007

The Coon Creek Bridge is a historic bridge in rural western Benton County, Arkansas. The bridge carries County Road 24 (Coon Hollow Road) across Coon Creek between Decatur and the Oklahoma state line. It is a single-span Warren pony truss bridge, with a span of 57 feet (17 m), that rests on concrete abutments. It was built in 1930 and underwent major rehabilitation in 1975.

The bridge was listed on the National Register of Historic Places in 2007.

== See also ==
- National Register of Historic Places listings in Benton County, Arkansas
- List of bridges on the National Register of Historic Places in Arkansas
