= Flint Creek Power Plant =

Power plant in Arkansas, USA

- Country: USA
- Location: Round Prairie Township, Benton County, near Gentry, Arkansas
- Coordinates: 36°15′20″N 94°31′22″W
- Status: Operational
- Commission date: 1978
- Owners: 50% SWEPCO/AEP and 50% Arkansas Electric Cooperative Corporation

Thermal power station
- Primary fuel: Powder River Basin Coal
- Cooling source: Little Flint Creek Reservoir

Power generation
- Units operational: 1
- Nameplate capacity: 528 MW

Flint Creek Power Plant is a base load, coal fired, electrical power station located west of Gentry, Arkansas in Benton County, Arkansas.

The lone unit uses coal mined from the Powder River Basin shipped via Kansas City Southern Railway. The output is owned jointly half and half by SWEPCO/AEP and Arkansas Electric Cooperative Corp.

As part of the project, SWEPCO constructed a 100’ high dam on Little Flint Creek to create a reservoir to provide cooling water to the plant. The reservoir, known as Lake Flint Creek or SWEPCO Lake, provides fishing opportunities and is open to the public.

== Units ==
Unit	Capacity	Commissioning	Notes
1	528 MW (Coal)	1978	

== See also ==
- List of power stations in Arkansas
- Global warming
- List of coal-fired power station in the United States
