= Roger Jackson =

Roger Jackson may refer to:

- Roger Jackson (rower) (born 1942), Canadian rower
- Roger Jackson (defensive back) (born 1959), American football player
- Roger Jackson (wide receiver) (born 1989), American football player
- Roger L. Jackson (born 1958), American voice actor
- Roger Jackson (cricketer) (born 1939), English cricketer
