= Cincinnati, Arkansas =

- Census-designated place
- Cincinnati's position in Arkansas. Cincinnati, Arkansas (the United States)
- Coordinates: 36°02′14″N 94°30′40″W
- Country: United States
- State: Arkansas
- County: Washington
- Named for: Cincinnatus
- Elevation: 1,073 ft (327 m)

Population (2020)
  - Total: 306
- Time zone: UTC-6 (Central (CST))
  - Summer (DST): UTC-5 (CDT)
- Zip code: 72769
- Area code: 479
- GNIS feature ID: 2805633

Cincinnati is an unincorporated community and census-designated place (CDP) in northwestern Washington County, Arkansas, United States. It was first listed as a CDP in the 2020 census with a population of 306.

Cincinnati receives mail delivery from Summers. It is part of the Northwest Arkansas region.

== Geography ==
Cincinnati is in the Ozarks on the southern edge of the Springfield Plateau, near the Boston Mountains. Cincinnati is on Arkansas Highway 59, approximately 4 miles (6.4 km) north of Summers on U.S. Route 62 and 1.5 miles (2.4 km) east of the Oklahoma border. The community developed on the west bank of Cincinnati Creek.

== History ==
In the early years before 1857, Cincinnati was first known as Buzzard Roost, then Silvia. This early settlement was such a thriving center of commerce that people came from Fayetteville, Arkansas for supplies.

Three of Cincinnati's inhabitants died during the 2010 New Year's Eve tornado outbreak. Another died four days later from injuries sustained in the tornado.

== Demographics ==
Historical population
Census	Pop.	Note	%±
2020	306		—
U.S. Decennial Census; 2020

=== 2020 census ===
Cincinnati CDP, Arkansas – Racial and ethnic composition Note: the US Census treats Hispanic/Latino as an ethnic category. This table excludes Latinos from the racial categories and assigns them to a separate category. Hispanics/Latinos may be of any race.
Race / Ethnicity (NH = Non-Hispanic)	Pop 2020	% 2020
White alone (NH)	194	63.40%
Black or African American alone (NH)	0	0.00%
Native American or Alaska Native alone (NH)	3	0.98%
Asian alone (NH)	27	8.82%
Pacific Islander alone (NH)	0	0.00%
Some Other Race alone (NH)	0	0.00%
Mixed Race or Multi-Racial (NH)	46	15.03%
Hispanic or Latino (any race)	36	11.76%
Total	306	100.00%

== Education ==
Cincinnati is in the Siloam Springs Schools school district. The district's sole comprehensive high school is Siloam Springs High School.

== Transportation ==
As of 2023, there is no fixed route transit service in Cincinnati. Ozark Regional Transit operates demand-response service in the area. The nearest intercity bus service is provided by Jefferson Lines in Fayetteville.
