= Siloam Springs School District =

School district in Arkansas, United States

Address
- 847 South Dogwood Street Siloam Springs, Arkansas, 72761; United States

District information
- Type: Public
- Grades: PreK–12
- NCES District ID: 0512450

Students and staff
- Students: 4,294
- Teachers: 291.55
- Staff: 365.6
- Student–teacher ratio: 14.73

Other information
- Website: www.siloamschools.com

Siloam Springs School District 21 is a school district in Benton County, Arkansas, headquartered in Siloam Springs.

The district has territory in Benton County and Washington County. In addition to Siloam Springs, the district includes all of Cincinnati in Washington County, and a small section of Gentry in Benton County,

== Schools ==
Secondary:

- Siloam Springs High School (9-12)
- Siloam Springs Middle School (7-8)

Primary:

- Siloam Springs Intermediate School (5-6)
- Southside Elementary School (3-4)
- Delbert "Pete" & Pat Allen Elementary School (1-2)
- Northside Elementary School (preschool and kindergarten)

Alternative:

- Main Street Academy (9-12)
