= Cherokee City, Arkansas =

- Census-designated place
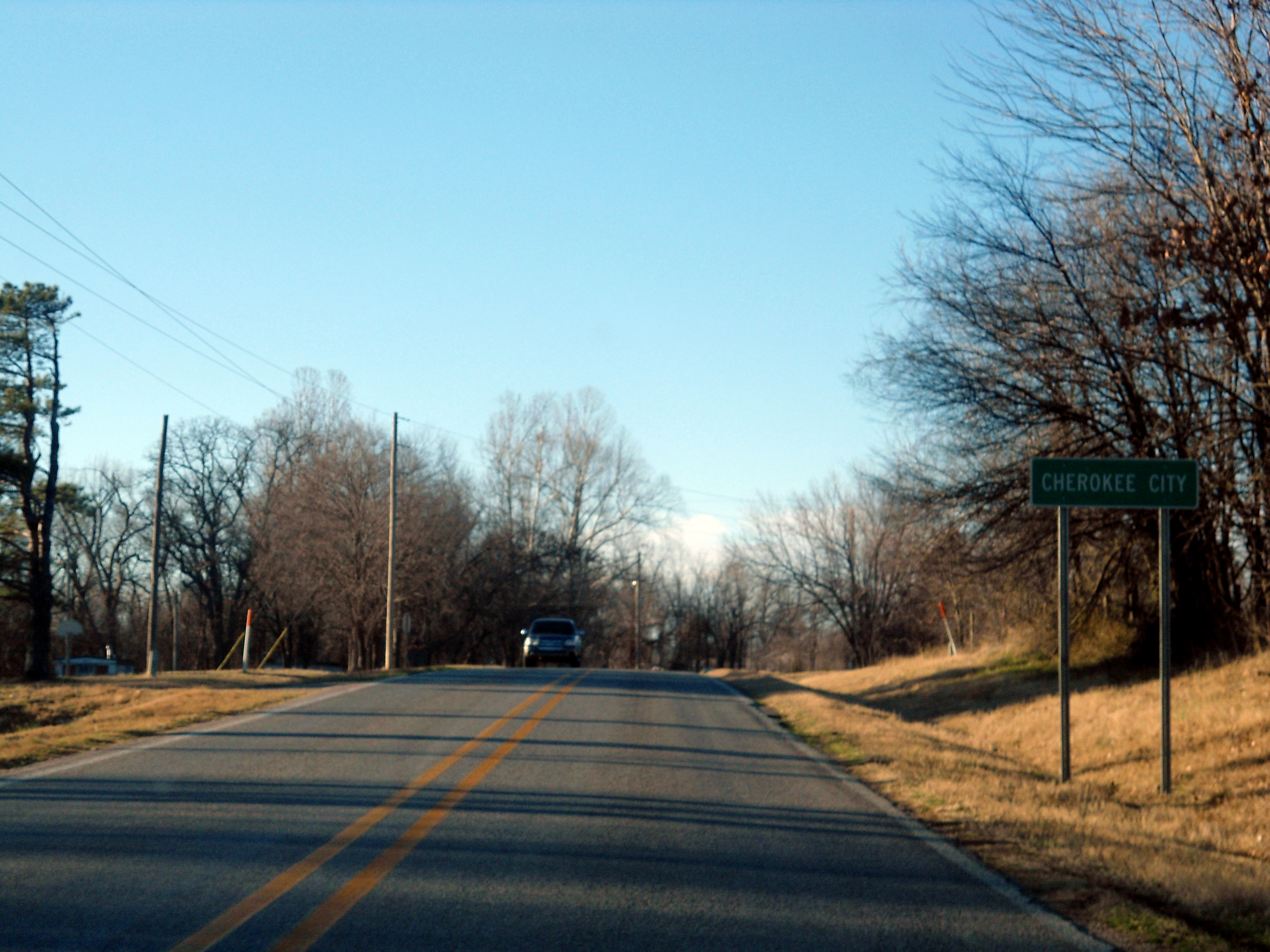
- Cherokee City southern limits, February 2013

- Location of Cherokee City in Benton County, Arkansas.

- Location within Arkansas
- Coordinates: 36°17′54″N 94°34′40″W
- Country: United States
- State: Arkansas
- County: Benton

Area
  - Total: 0.47 sq mi (1.21 km^{2})
  - Land: 0.47 sq mi (1.21 km^{2})
  - Water: 0 sq mi (0.00 km^{2})
- Elevation: 1,155 ft (352 m)

Population (2020)
  - Total: 73
  - Density: 155.8/sq mi (60.17/km^{2})
- Time zone: UTC-6 (Central (CST))
  - Summer (DST): UTC-5 (CDT)
- Area code: 479
- GNIS feature ID: 76597

Cherokee City is an unincorporated census-designated place (CDP) in Benton County, Arkansas, United States. Per the 2020 census, the population was 73. It is the location of (or is the nearest community to) Coon Creek Bridge, which is located on Cty Rd. 24 and is listed on the National Register of Historic Places. The community was named for the Cherokee, since the Trail of Tears crossed the landscape when the Cherokee migrated west to Indian Territory, now Oklahoma in the late 1830s. The town is within the Northwest Arkansas region, located about 5 miles east of Oklahoma and 4 miles south of the Missouri state line.

== Demographics ==
Historical population
Census	Pop.	Note	%±
2010	72		—
2020	73		1.4%
U.S. Decennial Census; 2010 2020

=== 2020 census ===
Cherokee City CDP, Arkansas – Racial and ethnic composition Note: the US Census treats Hispanic/Latino as an ethnic category. This table excludes Latinos from the racial categories and assigns them to a separate category. Hispanics/Latinos may be of any race.
Race / Ethnicity (NH = Non-Hispanic)	Pop 2010	Pop 2020	% 2010	% 2020
White alone (NH)	64	51	88.89%	69.86%
Black or African American alone (NH)	0	2	0.00%	2.74%
Native American or Alaska Native alone (NH)	4	2	5.56%	2.74%
Asian alone (NH)	0	3	0.00%	4.11%
Pacific Islander alone (NH)	0	0	0.00%	0.00%
Some Other Race alone (NH)	0	0	0.00%	0.00%
Mixed Race or Multi-Racial (NH)	2	10	2.78%	13.70%
Hispanic or Latino (any race)	2	5	2.78%	6.85%
Total	72	73	100.00%	100.00%

== History ==
Cherokee City was platted in 1880. A post office called Cherokee City was established in 1871, and remained in operation until 1953.

== Education ==
Public education is available from the Gentry School District, that leads to graduation from Gentry High School.
