= Bank of Gentry =

- U.S. National Register of Historic Places
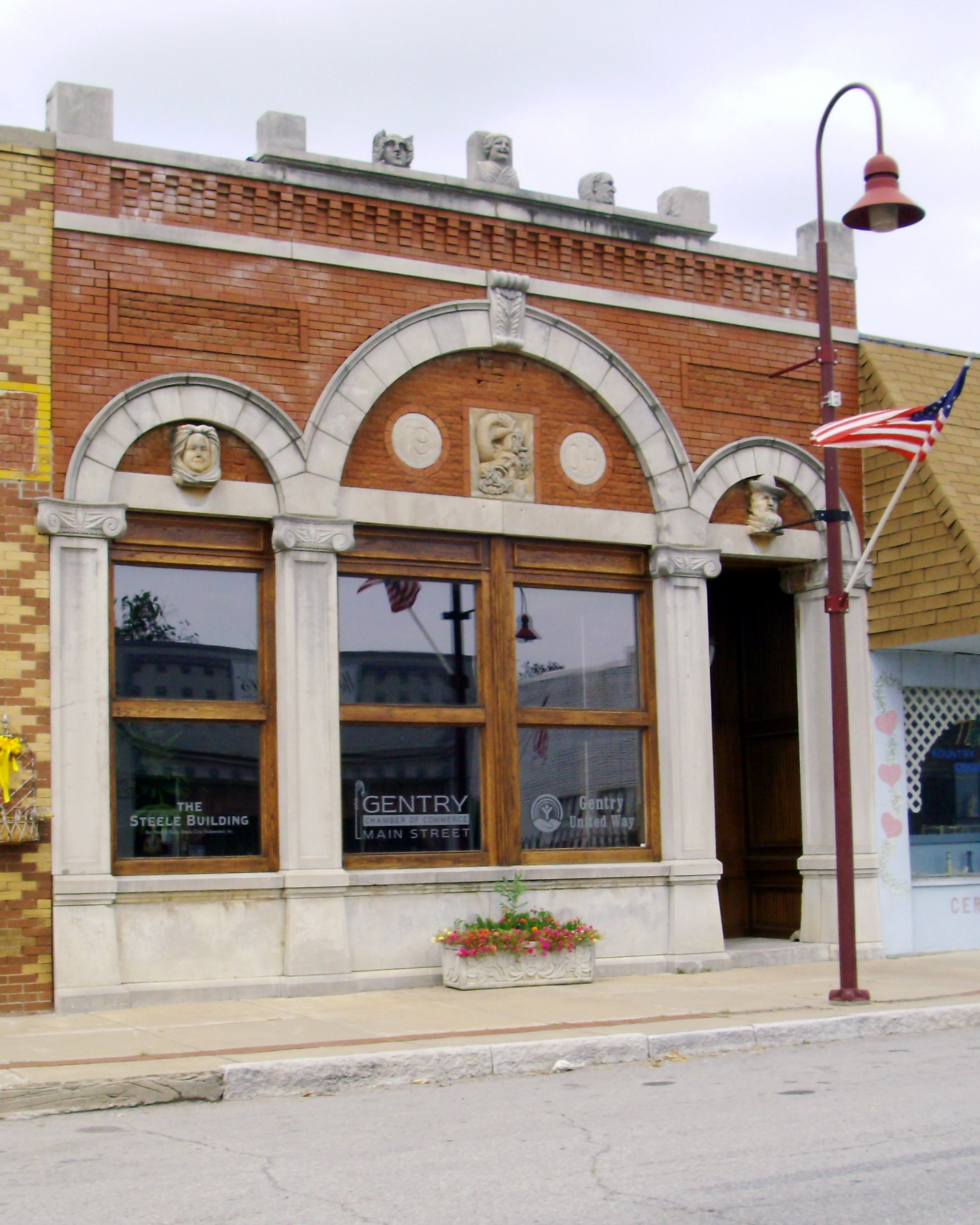

- Location within Arkansas Location within the United States
- Location: Main St., Gentry, Arkansas
- Coordinates: 36°16′3″N 94°28′58″W
- Area: less than one acre
- Built: 1904
- MPS: Benton County MRA
- NRHP reference No.: 87002416
- Added to NRHP: January 28, 1988

The Bank of Gentry is a historic bank building on Main Street in Gentry, Arkansas. Built in 1901, it is the most architecturally significant building in the city's downtown. Its main facade consists of three arched sections, the center one larger and higher than those that flank it. The arches are supported by pilasters with Ionic capitals. The building is capped by a string course and brick corbelling, with plain blocks and sculpted-head blocks as a decorative finale.

The building was listed on the National Register of Historic Places in 1988.

== See also ==
- National Register of Historic Places listings in Benton County, Arkansas
