= Gentry High School (Arkansas) =

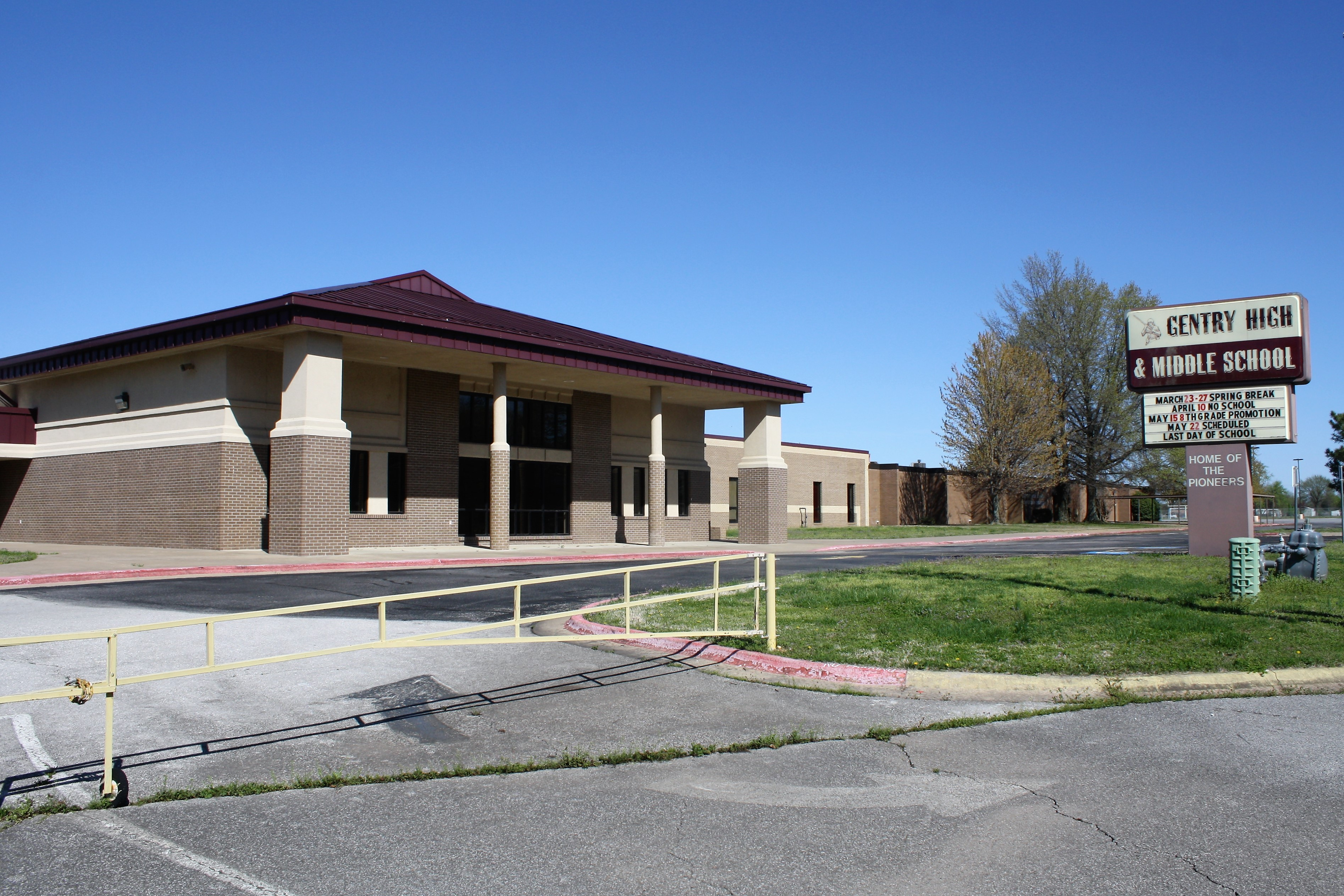

Location
- 1055 Pioneer Lane; Gentry, Arkansas 72734; United States; 36°15′38″N 94°29′39″W

Information
- School type: Public comprehensive
- Founded: 1897 (129 years ago)
- Status: Open
- School district: Gentry School District
- CEEB code: 040875
- NCES School ID: 050654000390
- Teaching staff: 72.86 (on FTE basis)
- Grades: 9–12
- Enrollment: 538 (2023-2024)
- Student to teacher ratio: 7.38
- Education system: ADE Smart Core
- Classes offered: Regular, Advanced Placement (AP)
- Colors: Maroon and white
- Athletics conference: 4A Region 1
- Mascot: Pioneer
- Team name: Gentry Pioneers
- Accreditation: ADE; AdvancED (1993–)
- Yearbook: Pioneer
- Feeder schools: Gentry Middle School (6–8)
- Website: www.gentrypioneers.com/page/gentry-high-school

Gentry High School is a comprehensive public high school located in the fringe town of Gentry, Arkansas, United States. Established in 1897, today the school provides secondary education for students in grades 9 through 12. It is one of nine public high schools in Benton County, Arkansas and the sole high school administered by the Gentry School District. The school district, and therefore the high school attendance boundary, includes the vast majority of Gentry, all of Cherokee City and Springtown, and western portions of Highfill.

== Academics ==
Gentry High School is accredited by the Arkansas Department of Education (ADE) and has been accredited by AdvancED since 1983. The assumed course of study follows the Smart Core curriculum developed by the ADE, which requires students complete at least 22 units prior to graduation. Students complete regular coursework and exams and may take Advanced Placement (AP) courses and exam with the opportunity to receive college credit.

== Athletics ==
The Gentry High School mascot and athletic emblem is the Pioneer with maroon and white serving as the school colors.

The Gentry Pioneers compete in interscholastic activities within the 4A Classification via the 4A Region 1 Conference, as administered by the Arkansas Activities Association. The Pioneers field teams in football, soccer (boys/girls), golf (boys/girls), basketball (boys/girls), wrestling, baseball, softball, track and field (boys/girls), bowling (boys/girls), and cheer.

The Pioneers wrestling team won the 5A-1A classification state wrestling championship in the 2009–10 school year. The Pioneers cheerleading won the 4A state cheerleading championship in the 2010–2011 school year. The Pioneers girls basketball team won the 4A state championship for the 1988–89 school year.
