= Highfill, Arkansas =

- Town
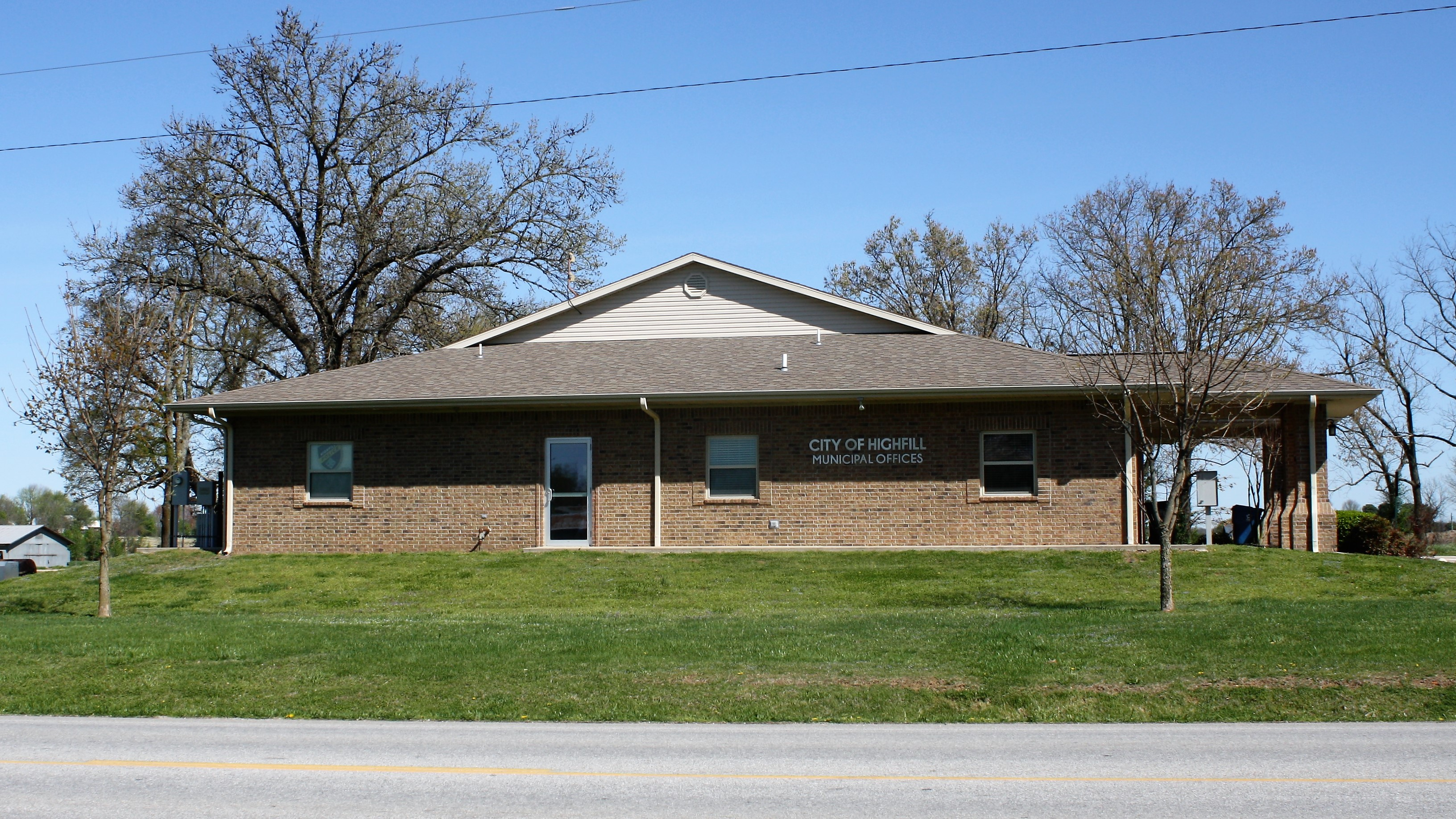
- City Hall

- Logo

- Location of Highfill in Benton County, Arkansas.
- Coordinates: 36°16′14″N 94°19′30″W
- Country: United States
- State: Arkansas
- County: Benton

Area
  - Total: 18.12 sq mi (46.94 km^{2})
  - Land: 18.02 sq mi (46.68 km^{2})
  - Water: 0.10 sq mi (0.27 km^{2})
- Elevation: 1,355 ft (413 m)

Population (2020)
  - Total: 1,587
  - Estimate (2025): 3,676 ▲
  - Density: 88/sq mi (34/km^{2})
- Time zone: UTC-6 (Central (CST))
  - Summer (DST): UTC-5 (CDT)
- ZIP codes: 72713, 72734
- Area code: 479
- FIPS code: 05-32200
- GNIS feature ID: 0057923
- Website: highfillarkansas.gov

Highfill is a town in Benton County, Arkansas, United States. The population was 1,587 as of the 2020 census. It is home to the Northwest Arkansas National Airport, which serves all of the Northwest Arkansas region. In September 2023, officials of the airport voted to detach itself from the city over taxing and public service disputes.

== Geography ==
Highfill is located in west-central Benton County at 36°16′14″N 94°19′30″W (36.270483, -94.325093). Arkansas Highway 12 passes through the town, leading northeast to Bentonville and Rogers and west to Gentry. The Northwest Arkansas National Airport occupies the eastern part of town.

According to the United States Census Bureau, Highfill has a total area of 18.3 square miles (47.3 km^{2}), of which 18.2 square miles (47.1 km^{2}) is land and 0.12 square miles (0.3 km^{2}), or 0.58%, is water.

== Demographics ==
Historical population
Census	Pop.	Note	%±
1960	92		—
1970	80		−13.0%
1980	92		15.0%
1990	84		−8.7%
2000	379		351.2%
2010	583		53.8%
2020	1,587		172.2%
2025 (est.)	3,676	▲	131.6%
U.S. Decennial Census

=== 2020 census ===
As of the 2020 census, Highfill had a population of 1,587. The median age was 28.9 years. 29.7% of residents were under the age of 18 and 8.6% of residents were 65 years of age or older. For every 100 females there were 100.4 males, and for every 100 females age 18 and over there were 99.8 males age 18 and over.

0.0% of residents lived in urban areas, while 100.0% lived in rural areas.

There were 569 households in Highfill, of which 41.1% had children under the age of 18 living in them. Of all households, 57.6% were married-couple households, 14.9% were households with a male householder and no spouse or partner present, and 17.8% were households with a female householder and no spouse or partner present. About 17.1% of all households were made up of individuals and 4.4% had someone living alone who was 65 years of age or older.

There were 588 housing units, of which 3.2% were vacant. The homeowner vacancy rate was 0.2% and the rental vacancy rate was 3.3%.

Racial composition as of the 2020 census
Race	Number	Percent
White	1,109	69.9%
Black or African American	34	2.1%
American Indian and Alaska Native	28	1.8%
Asian	97	6.1%
Native Hawaiian and Other Pacific Islander	4	0.3%
Some other race	128	8.1%
Two or more races	187	11.8%
Hispanic or Latino (of any race)	247	15.6%

=== 2010 census ===
As of the census of 2010, there were 561 people, 191 households, and 153 families residing in the town. The population density was 12.9/km^{2} (33/mi^{2}). There were 165 housing units at an average density of 5.6/km^{2} (15/mi^{2}). The racial makeup of the town was 92.08% White, 5.28% Native American, 1.06% Asian, 1.32% from other races, and 0.26% from two or more races. 1.06% of the population were Hispanic or Latino of any race.

There were 144 households, out of which 32.6% had children under the age of 18 living with them, 61.1% were married couples living together, 11.8% had a female householder with no husband present, and 22.9% were non-families. 19.4% of all households were made up of individuals, and 6.9% had someone living alone who was 65 years of age or older. The average household size was 2.63 and the average family size was 2.90.

In the town, the population was spread out, with 26.4% under the age of 18, 8.4% from 18 to 24, 31.4% from 25 to 44, 22.7% from 45 to 64, and 11.1% who were 65 years of age or older. The median age was 34 years. For every 100 females, there were 100.5 males. For every 100 females age 18 and over, there were 95.1 males.

The median income for a household in the town was $28,854, and the median income for a family was $30,938. Males had a median income of $21,477 versus $21,705 for females. The per capita income for the town was $12,701. About 5.3% of families and 18.6% of the population were below the poverty line, including 21.4% of those under age 18 and 29.2% of those age 65 or over.

== Education ==
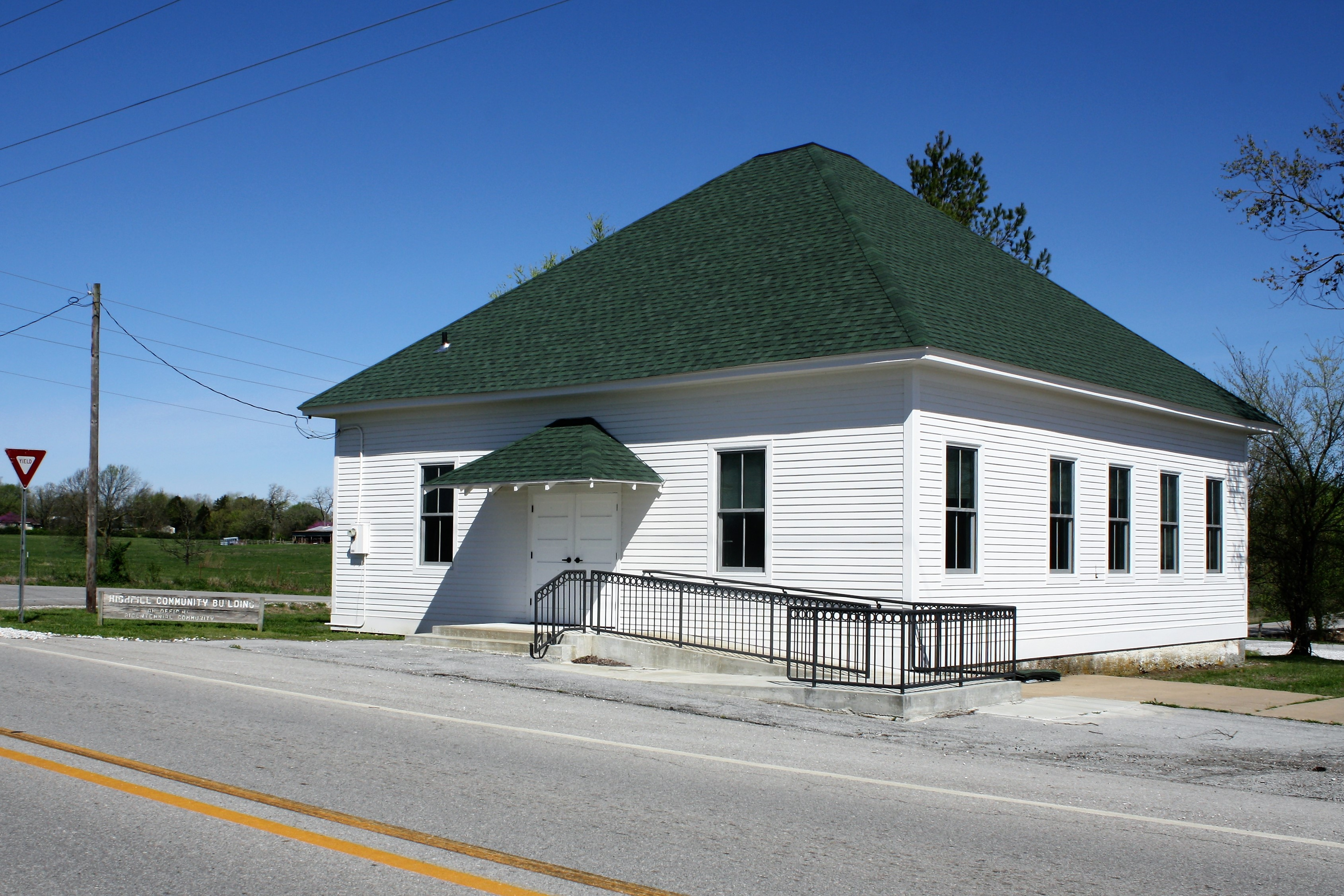
The school in Highfill (constructed c. 1911) was consolidated into Gentry in 1948

Public education is available from these school districts based on resident's location:

- Gentry School District that leads to graduation from Gentry High School.
- Bentonville School District - Zoned schools for this portion of Highfill are: Vaughn Elementary School, Creekside Middle School, Grimsley Junior High School, and Bentonville West High School.
- A small section of Highfill is in the Decatur School District. Decatur High School is that district's comprehensive high school.

== Dispute with XNA Airport ==
In September 2023, the board of Northwest Arkansas National Airport (XNA) voted to begin the process of detaching itself from the city of Highfill. The vote was unanimous among the board members present for the vote, while two board members were not present and did not vote.

Among the issues causing the dispute was the taxing of transactions at the airport. All airport transactions were subject to a Highfill city sales tax of 2%. Attorneys for the airport maintained that the airport property received no benefit from the city in regard to policing, firefighting, and road maintenance.

According to a new Arkansas law in 2023, the airport would be responsible for paying off city bonds if it chooses to finalize the detachment from the city.
