= R. V. Carleton =

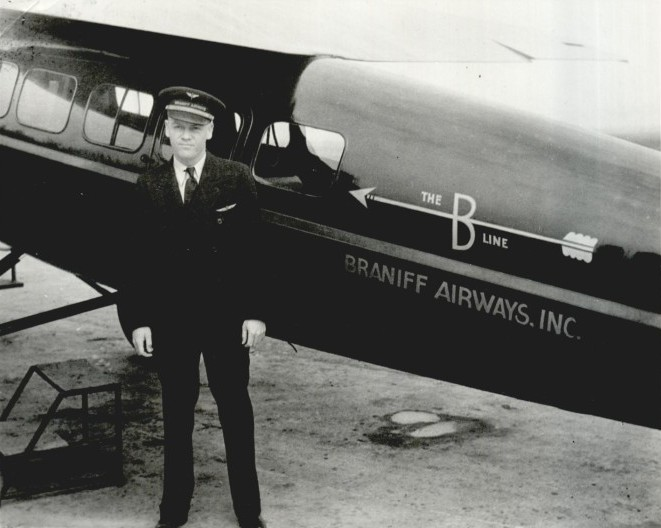
Captain R. V. Carleton standing next to a Braniff Airway's Inc., Lockheed Vega aircraft in 1931.

R. V. Carleton (September 4, 1905 – February 10, 1987) who worked for Braniff International, the Dallas, Texas, based airline, for nearly 40 years, began as a line captain and retired as executive vice president. As an aviator he pioneered South American airline routes and chaired the first worldwide symposium on supersonic transport aircraft. He was a celebrated figure in the field of aviation with an impressive list of accomplishments and contributions to the industry that he cherished.

== Early years ==
Carleton was born on September 4, 1905, at Elk City in Beckham County, Oklahoma, West of Oklahoma City. His parents were Virgil Frances Carleton born February 5, 1875, in Russellville, Missouri, and Olga Mae Smallwood Carleton of Hardin, Ray County, Missouri, born on January 12, 1878. The family moved to nearby Clinton, Custer County, Oklahoma, in 1920, when R. V. was 14 years old. Throughout his life, Carleton used his initials R. V. as his nickname and stated that they stood for nothing.

Young Carleton found a love for airplanes during his pre-school years when he would build model airplanes and dream about flying them one day. Far from a passing interest, Carleton's love for aviation was well known among his high school classmates and his class yearbook stated that he would be "up in the air."

== Education and initial pilot training ==
While attending law school, in 1926, at the University of Oklahoma, Mr. Carleton learned how to fly. He was taught by James Guy Haizlip, a famous stunt pilot. Carleton, Haizlip, and Roy O. Hunt, one of the nation's top stunt pilots, barnstormed throughout the state of Oklahoma during the late 1920s. Carleton was a quick study and soloed in an OX Waco-9 in only two and one half hours of flight instruction and then earned his Private Pilot license shortly thereafter. In 1928, he obtained his Transport License, certificate number 2969 (numbered from the first pilot to receive certification), in Oklahoma City, from Inspector R. D. Bedlinger, who noted that Carleton "was a very good pilot."

== Marriage and family ==
Carleton married Alice Ruth Calmes on July 22, 1928, (September 29, 1905-June 17, 1980) at the age of 23. R.V. and Ruth, childhood sweethearts growing up together in Arapaho, Oklahoma, took Carleton's single engine airplane, that he was using to barnstorm around the country, to elope. The couple had one child, Rosemary Leigh "Rosie" Carleton born in 1946. The Carleton's moved to Portland, Maine, in 1930, and Kansas City in 1935, when Carleton was 30 years old.

== Early aviation career ==
In 1929, he attended an instructor's standardization school at Curtiss-Wright Aircraft in Detroit, Michigan. As a result of attending this course he was offered and accepted the position of Chief Pilot at the Curtiss-Wright base at Portland, Maine. Carleton remained with Curtiss-Wright until he was offered and accepted a pilot position with Braniff Airways.

== Braniff International Airways ==
On June 6, 1931, Carleton was hired by Braniff Airways, Inc. and made his first flight the following day in a Lockheed Vega, from Kansas City to Tulsa and continuing to Oklahoma City; and then returning over the same routing. He recalled, at his retirement, that his salary was $350 per month – when the company could afford to pay. On January 27, 1932, Carleton set a speed record by flying the 114 miles from Oklahoma City to Tulsa, Oklahoma in a Lockheed Vega, in only 28 minutes. The record was set while flying a full load of six passengers on board the airliner.

In 1942, Carleton was promoted to the position of Chief Pilot and remained in that position until 1947, when he was promoted to director of flight operations. Also in 1947, Carleton was instrumental in Braniff becoming the first carrier to be certificated for Instrument Landing System (ILS) use by the Federal Government in April, 1947. He played a major role in the extensive pilot training for use of the new system.

Carleton played a pivotal role in the development of Braniff's South American route system. Braniff began Douglas DC-3 flights on January 8, 1949, from Lima to La Paz' El Alto International Airport which, with an elevation of 13,400 feet above mean sea level, was and is still today the highest international airport in the world. Larger Douglas DC-4s were substituted on the route when loads required additional capacity. The DC-4s that flew to La Paz were JATO (Jet Assisted Takeoff) equipped aircraft to aid the four engined airliners in the event that an engine was lost on takeoff. Carleton directed pre-service testing of JATO at La Paz, Bolivia, for aircraft operations at high altitude airports in the region, in early January 1949. Braniff became the first airline to be certificated by the Civil Aeronautics Authority, as a result of the successful completion of the Carleton-led tests, to operate JATO aircraft at La Paz. Carleton also flew the carrier's first proving flight over the Andean mountain range between Lima and Rio de Janeiro which led to the first non stop flights between the two opposite coastal points. He also oversaw the development of terminals at Campo Grande, Brazil; Guayaquil, Ecuador; and La Paz and Santa Cruz, Bolivia.

In 1952, Carleton was appointed the operations manager. He was elected to the Braniff board of directors in 1954, and appointed vice president of operations. In 1961, he became a member of the board of directors' executive committee and in 1964 he became executive vice president. He was later appointed as assistant to the chairman of the board.

On September 2, 1970, Carleton announced his retirement from Braniff International after 39 years of service. Braniff Chairman Harding L. Lawrence announced Captain Carleton's retirement with the statement, "Regrettably, we must announce the retirement of R. V. Carleton who is one of the aviation industry's most respected leaders and one of its true pioneers." Lawrence noted that Captain Carleton's retirement would become officially effective on October 1, 1970. Lawrence went on to state: "It is the vision and expertise of men like R. V. Carleton, who have brought aviation to the forefront of the transportation industry and positioned the airlines to take advantage of rapid technological advancement."

At the time of his retirement, Carleton was filling the positions of executive vice president and assistant to the chairman of the board. Carleton served in all areas of operations at Braniff throughout his 39-year career. His most recent duties included heading advance planning for the new aircraft generation including the Boeing 747 which would come on line in January, 1971. Carleton also played a pivotal role in planning for the supersonic passenger aircraft that were planned to be introduced at Braniff in the mid-1970s.

Upon his retirement the Federal Aviation Administration (FAA) issued a statement heralding the contributions that Carleton made to the industry: "Throughout your career you have been looked to for guidance and counseling both by government and industry in all areas of air carrier operations." The FAA plaque went on to say, "To R. V. Carleton on retirement from Braniff International Airways. The Federal Aviation Administration with best wishes and warmest regards in recognition of 40 years of significant contributions to the advancement of air carrier management and pioneering efforts in operational safety."

== Chairman SST Symposium ==
In 1961, Carleton acted as chairman the world's first Supersonic Transport Conference. The conference was held at Montreal, Quebec, Canada, and began on April 17, 1961. The symposium was sponsored by the International Air Transport Association and was attended by some 500 aeronautical experts from around the world. As a result of this conference and Captain Carleton's leadership, Braniff placed an order for two supersonic transport aircraft on April 13, 1964.

== Joins Mach 2 Club ==
Carleton joined the celebrated Mach 2 Club in 1964, when he became one of the first civilian pilots to fly a jet at twice the speed of sound at Edwards Air Force Base, California. Mr. Carleton piloted an F-104 Starfighter at twice the speed of sound which landed him in the exclusive high speed club. The purpose of the flight was to duplicate the operational characteristics of the proposed SST airliner from takeoff to Mach 2 or 1400 miles per hour, to landing.

== Returns to Braniff to host 747 tour ==
Retirement would not keep Captain Carleton from returning to Braniff for a special occasion. On January 9, 1971, Braniff International operated the second segment of a 17 city tour to introduce the airline's new Boeing 747-127 registered as N601BN and dubbed 747 Braniff Place. With the new plane Braniff would fly the original route between Oklahoma City and Tulsa that it first flew on June 20, 1928, and then continue on to record turnout at Memphis International Airport later in the day.

A Braniff official was on board each tour flight to host guests on the flight as well as dignitaries and press at each stop. Former Braniff Director Carleton hosted the flight from Dallas Love Field to Oklahoma City, Tulsa and finally Memphis on January 9. Captain Carleton flew for Braniff out of Oklahoma City in the early 1930s and was the perfect host for the monumental flight between the first two Braniff cities.

== Retirement and final years ==
On Tuesday, February 10, 1987, Captain Carleton died at a local Dallas Hospital after battling a prolonged illness. He was 81 years old. Captain Carleton was survived by one daughter, Mrs. Jackson H. Brown, and a grandson, Adam Carleton Brown. His wife of 52 years, Ruth Carleton, preceded him in death on June 17, 1980, in Dallas, Texas.

Memorial services were held in Dallas on February 13, 1987. Funeral services were held at Highland Park Presbyterian Church in Dallas, Texas, where he had been a member for many years. A private burial was held at Sparkman/Hillcrest Funeral Home and Cemetery at Dallas, Texas, where he was buried next to his wife.
