= Springtown, Arkansas =

- Town
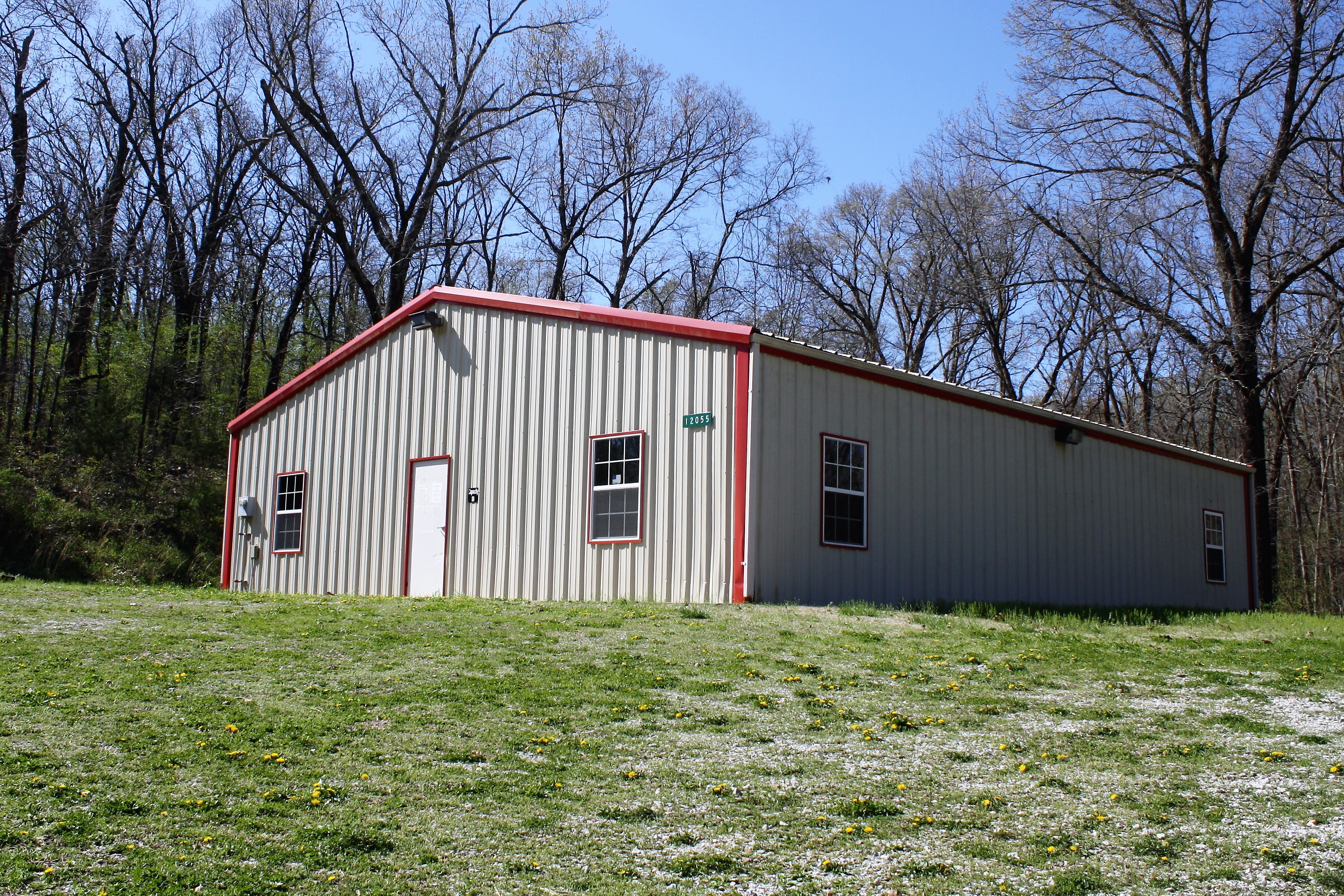
- City Hall

- Location of Springtown in Benton County, Arkansas.
- Coordinates: 36°15′39″N 94°25′21″W
- Country: United States
- State: Arkansas
- County: Benton

Area
  - Total: 0.54 sq mi (1.40 km^{2})
  - Land: 0.54 sq mi (1.40 km^{2})
  - Water: 0 sq mi (0.00 km^{2})
- Elevation: 1,207 ft (368 m)

Population (2020)
  - Total: 83
  - Estimate (2025): 93 ▲
  - Density: 153.4/sq mi (59.22/km^{2})
- Time zone: UTC-6 (Central (CST))
  - Summer (DST): UTC-5 (CDT)
- ZIP code: 72734
- Area code: 479
- FIPS code: 05-66200
- GNIS feature ID: 2407390

Springtown is a town in Benton County, Arkansas, United States. The population was 83, according to the 2020 census. It is part of the Northwest Arkansas region.

== History ==
The first settlement at Springtown was made in the 1840s and the town was platted in 1871. A post office called Springtown was established in the same year, which remained in operation until 1998. The community was named after a spring found near the original town site.

== Geography ==
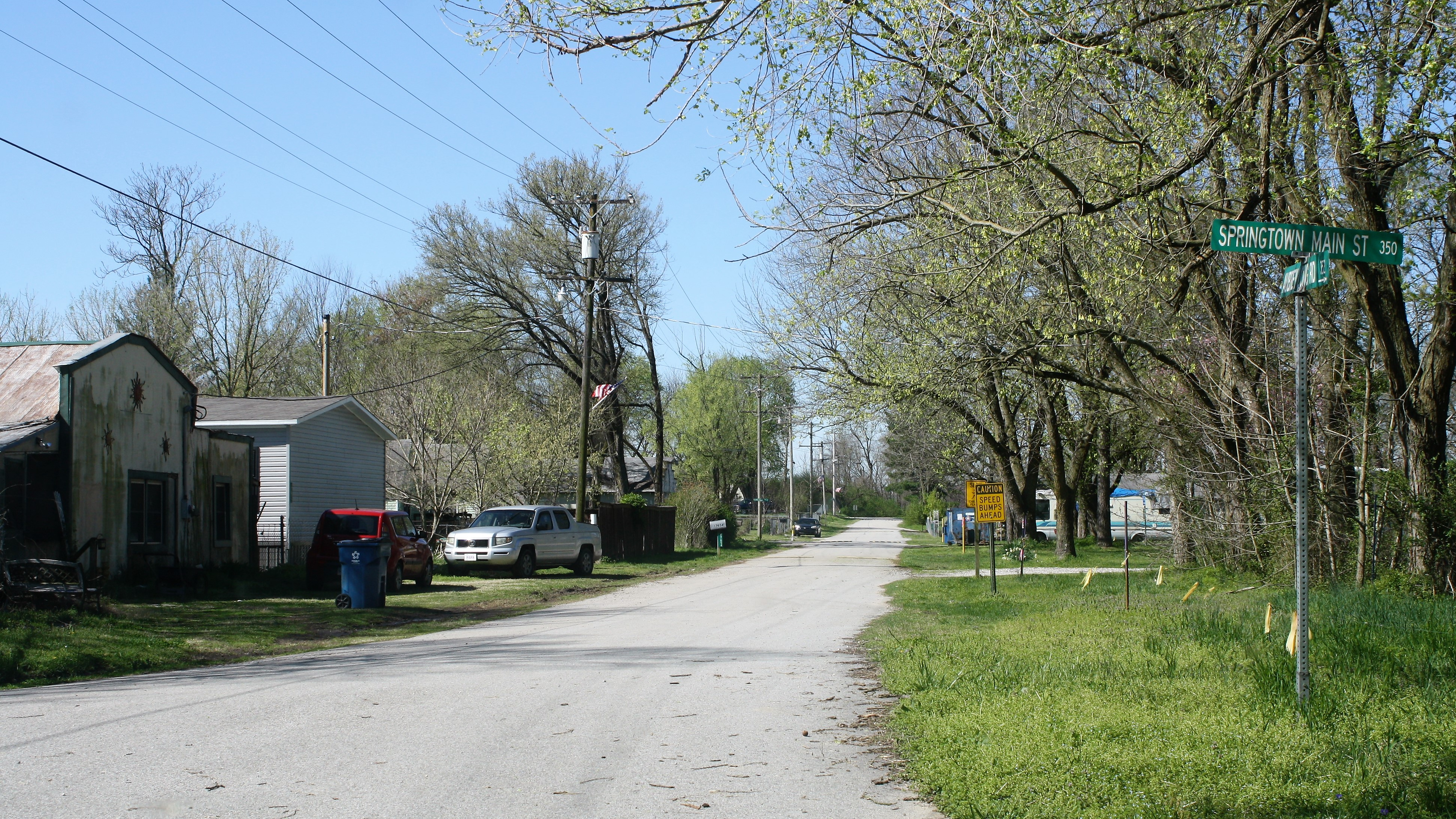
Main Street in Springtown

Springtown is located in southwest Benton County at 36°15′39″N 94°25′21″W (36.260908, -94.422370), between Highfill and Gentry.

According to the United States Census Bureau, the town has a total area of 0.54 square miles (1.4 km^{2}), all land.

== Demographics ==
Historical population
Census	Pop.	Note	%±
1880	95		—
1940	104		—
1950	102		−1.9%
1960	82		−19.6%
2000	114		—
2010	87		−23.7%
2020	83		−4.6%
2025 (est.)	93	▲	12.0%
U.S. Decennial Census

As of the census of 2000, there were 114 people, 41 households, and 30 families residing in the town. The population density was 81.5/km^{2} (212.6/mi^{2}). There were 47 housing units at an average density of 33.6/km^{2} (87.7/mi^{2}). The racial makeup of the town was 85.09% White, 6.14% Native American, 0.88% Asian, 3.51% from other races, and 4.39% from two or more races. 8.77% of the population were Hispanic or Latino of any race.

There were 41 households, out of which 36.6% had children under the age of 18 living with them, 58.5% were married couples living together, 14.6% had a female householder with no husband present, and 24.4% were non-families. 24.4% of all households were made up of individuals, and 7.3% had someone living alone who was 65 years of age or older. The average household size was 2.78 and the average family size was 3.26.

In the town, the population was spread out, with 28.1% under the age of 18, 15.8% from 18 to 24, 29.8% from 25 to 44, 19.3% from 45 to 64, and 7.0% who were 65 years of age or older. The median age was 31 years. For every 100 females, there were 93.2 males. For every 100 females age 18 and over, there were 95.2 males.

The median income for a household in the town was $26,250, and the median income for a family was $38,750. Males had a median income of $25,750 versus $21,250 for females. The per capita income for the town was $12,497. There were 13.0% of families and 10.2% of the population living below the poverty line, including no under eighteens and none of those over 64.

== Education ==
Public education for elementary and secondary students is primarily provided by the Gentry School District, which leads to graduation from Gentry High School.

== Parks and recreation ==
Conservation-minded landowners, Mr. John Wasson and his family, donated 67 acres of habitat along Flint Creek in Springtown, Arkansas beginning in 2016. The parking area for Flint Creek Headwaters Preserve is on Peach Blossom Lane, just south of the intersection of HWY 12 and Springtown Cutoff Rd. There is currently a .5-mile trail beginning at the parking area. This trail goes west to Flint Creek and then heads north, going under the HWY 12 bridge and meandering next to the creek through riparian forest. Another .14-mile trail spurs from Wasson Trail just down the path from the parking area. This trail is on an old railroad bed and offers nice views overlooking Flint Creek. All trails are easy hiking, except for a short scramble through rocks under the bridge.
