= Gentry, Arkansas =

- City
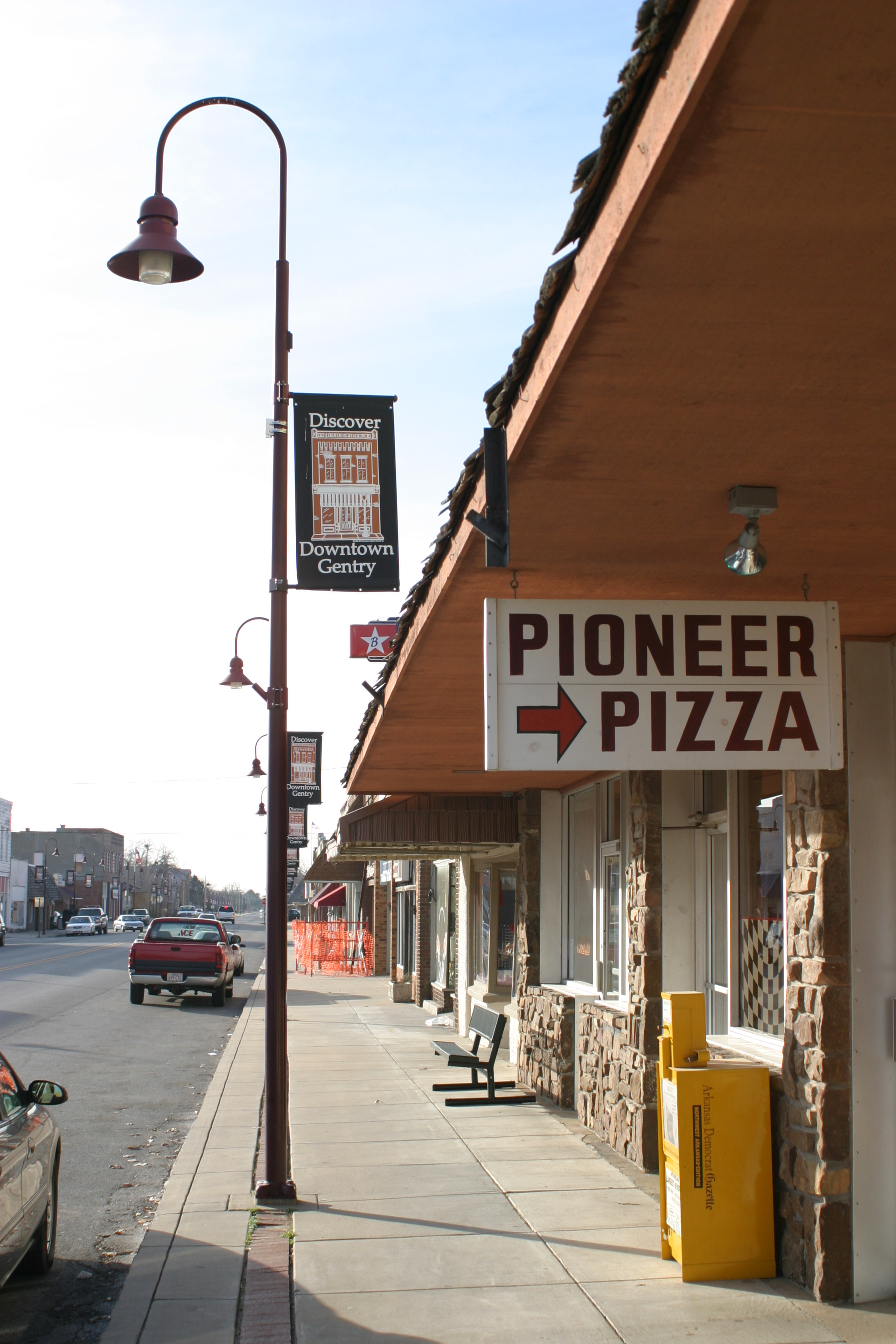
- Downtown Gentry

- Logo
- Motto: "Our Roots Run Deep"
- Location of Gentry in Benton County, Arkansas.
- Coordinates: 36°15′27″N 94°29′24″W
- Country: United States
- State: Arkansas
- County: Benton

Area
  - Total: 5.20 sq mi (13.47 km^{2})
  - Land: 5.17 sq mi (13.40 km^{2})
  - Water: 0.023 sq mi (0.06 km^{2})
- Elevation: 1,191 ft (363 m)

Population (2020)
  - Total: 3,790
  - Estimate (2025): 4,899 ▲
  - Density: 732.5/sq mi (282.82/km^{2})
- Time zone: UTC-6 (Central (CST))
  - Summer (DST): UTC-5 (CDT)
- ZIP code: 72734
- Area code: 479
- FIPS code: 05-26290
- GNIS feature ID: 2403688
- Website: www.gentryar.gov

Gentry is a city in Benton County, Arkansas, United States. The population was 3,790 as of the 2020 census. The city was founded in the Ozark Mountains in 1894 along what would become the Kansas City Southern Railroad. The city's prior prosperity in the orchard industry, especially apples, was further strengthened by the rail connection. Following the decline of the apple industry in the 1930s, Gentry shifted its economy towards poultry along with many other areas of Northwest Arkansas.

== History ==
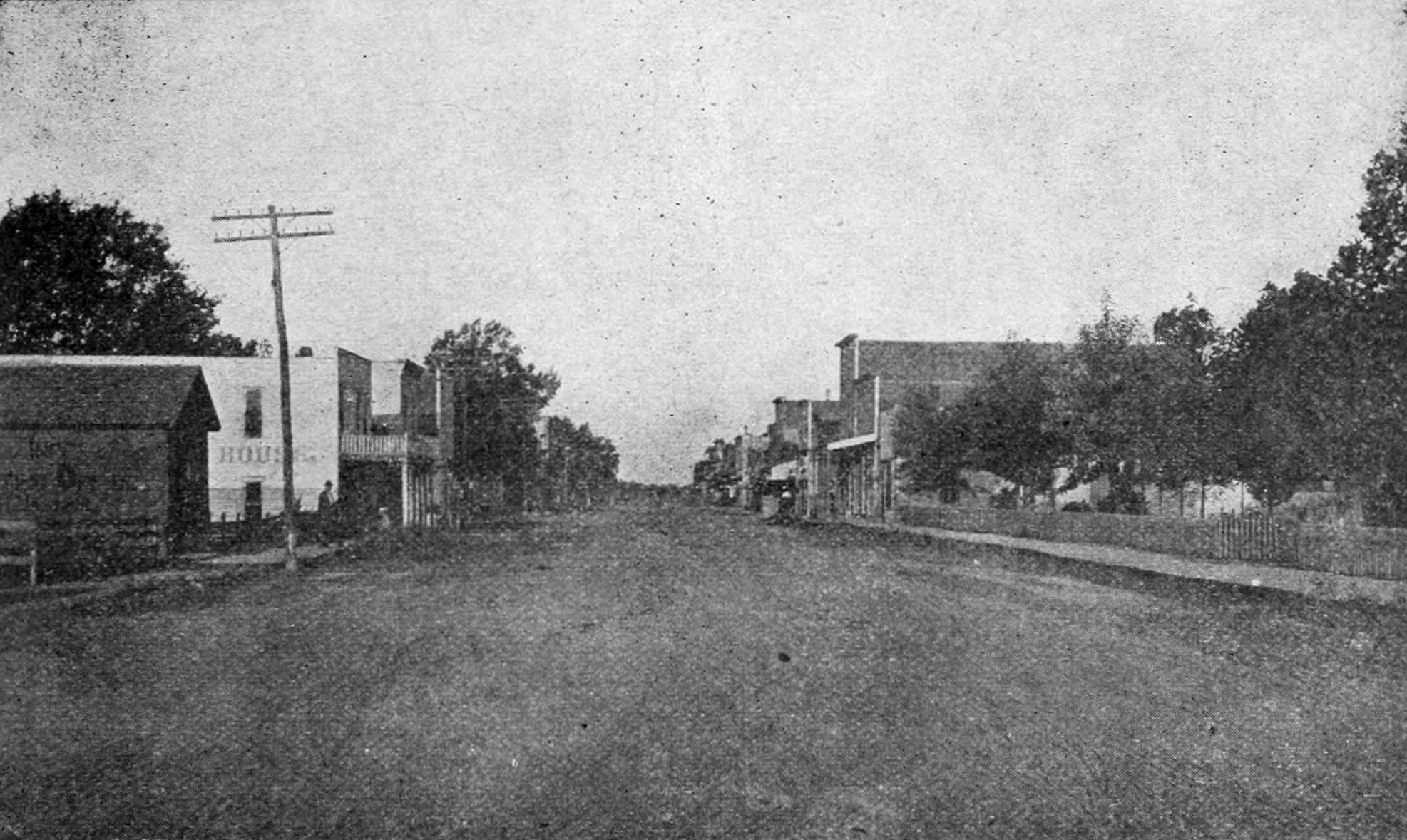
Gentry in 1912

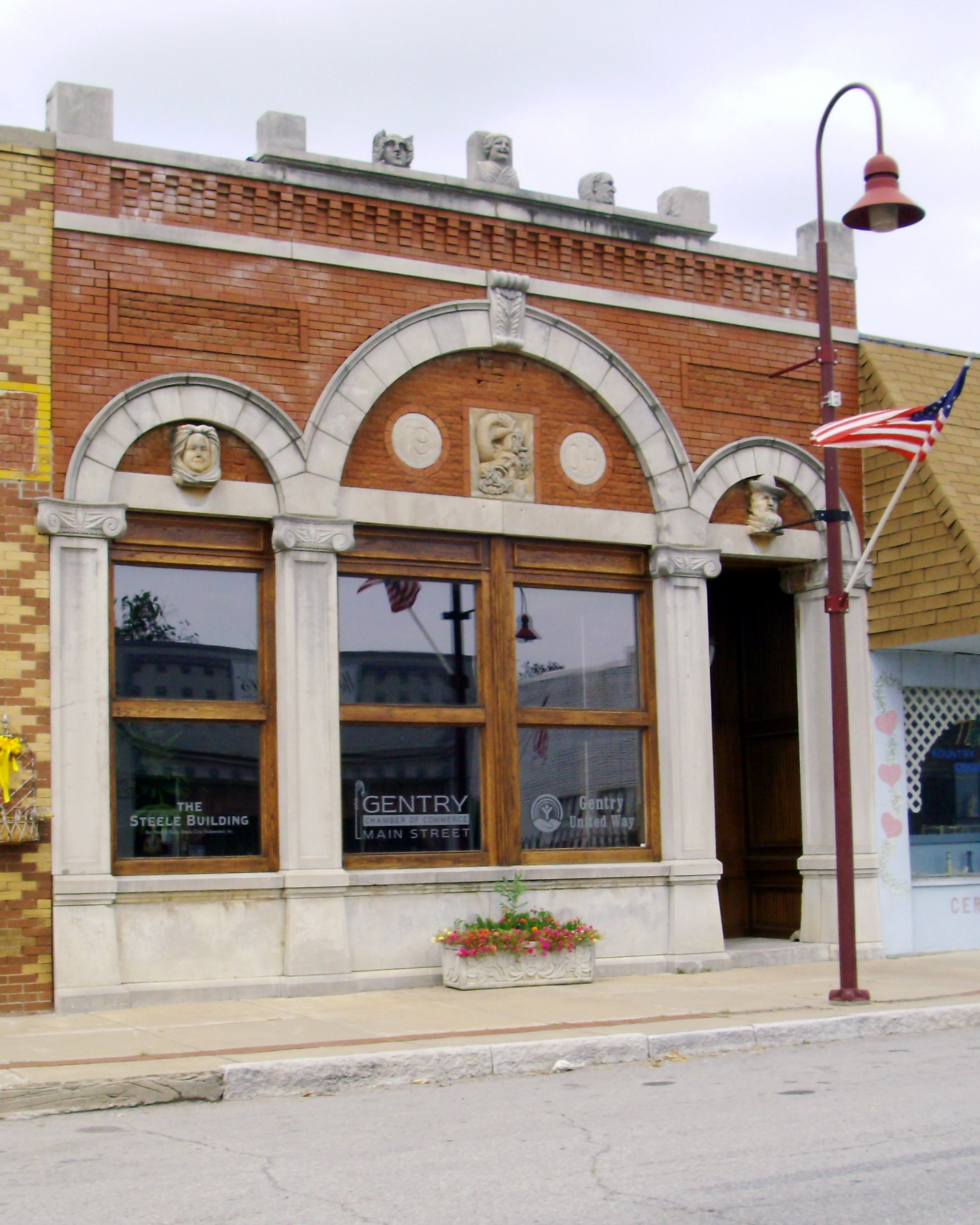
The historic Bank of Gentry building was built in 1904 and added to the National Register of Historic Places (NRHP) in 1988.

Gentry began as a rural Ozark agricultural community named Orchard City. Located in western Benton County, it was known for its apple orchards and other produce. The town began to grow when the Kansas City Southern Railroad was constructed through the town. In 1894, residents of the community petitioned the county to officially incorporate, and the city's name was changed to Gentry, after an official in charge of the construction of the railroad.

The railroad proved important to Gentry, and by 1903 the town had grown to a population of 1,000.

The railroad company built a new depot in Gentry in 1926–1927. It was known as one of the nicest depots on the railway line. A banquet was held for the grand opening, and railway officials arrived on a special train to commemorate the event. Four to six passenger trains a week came through Gentry until passenger service was discontinued in 1964.

In 1937, Highway 59 was built, running through the city north and south. It remains the main highway through the city, linking Gentry with other west Benton County communities.

In 1946, the City Council voted to buy a water tank for $1,650 from the War Assets Corporation in Kentucky. In 1948, the city held a special election to issue bonds to install larger water mains and additional fireplugs. In the 1950s, the city purchased its own water company. At the beginning of the 21st century, Gentry was expanding water lines into rural areas surrounding the community.

Using donations, local businesses built the first auditorium at the intersection of Main and Collins streets. The building now houses the city's courtroom.

In the 1960s, when agriculture was no longer the economic base it had once been for the city and the railroad, the train depot was torn down.

The next decade saw the beginning of the construction of a power plant by Southwestern Electric Power Company (often known as SWEPCO). The plant, located 1 mile (1.6 km) west of the city limits, is a coal-fueled electric generating facility called Flint Creek Power Plant. Today SWEPCO continues to provide electrical power, and SWEPCO Lake (shown on maps as "Lake Flint Creek") is used for fishing and recreation. To ease traffic through downtown, a new Arkansas Highway 12 bypass was built on the southern edge of town. In the early 1970s, the Wild Wilderness Drive-Through Safari was established north of town. The 400-acre (160 ha) park is home to a variety of exotic animals and consists of a 4 miles (6 km) drive-through, petting parks and walk-through areas for interaction with the animals. In 1983, the McKee Foods Corporation (then known as McKee Baking Company) opened its manufacturing facility in Gentry.

The city celebrated its centennial in 1994 and held a 110th Birthday Bash in 2004.

== Geography ==
Gentry is located at the intersection of Highway 12 and Highway 59.

According to the United States Census Bureau, the city has a total area of 4.2 square miles (11.0 km^{2}), of which 0.019 square miles (0.05 km^{2}), or 0.44%, is water.

== Demographics ==
Historical population
Census	Pop.	Note	%±
1900	419		—
1910	668		59.4%
1920	724		8.4%
1930	779		7.6%
1940	726		−6.8%
1950	729		0.4%
1960	686		−5.9%
1970	1,022		49.0%
1980	1,468		43.6%
1990	1,726		17.6%
2000	2,165		25.4%
2010	3,158		45.9%
2020	3,790		20.0%
2025 (est.)	4,899	▲	29.3%
U.S. Decennial Census; 2015 Estimate

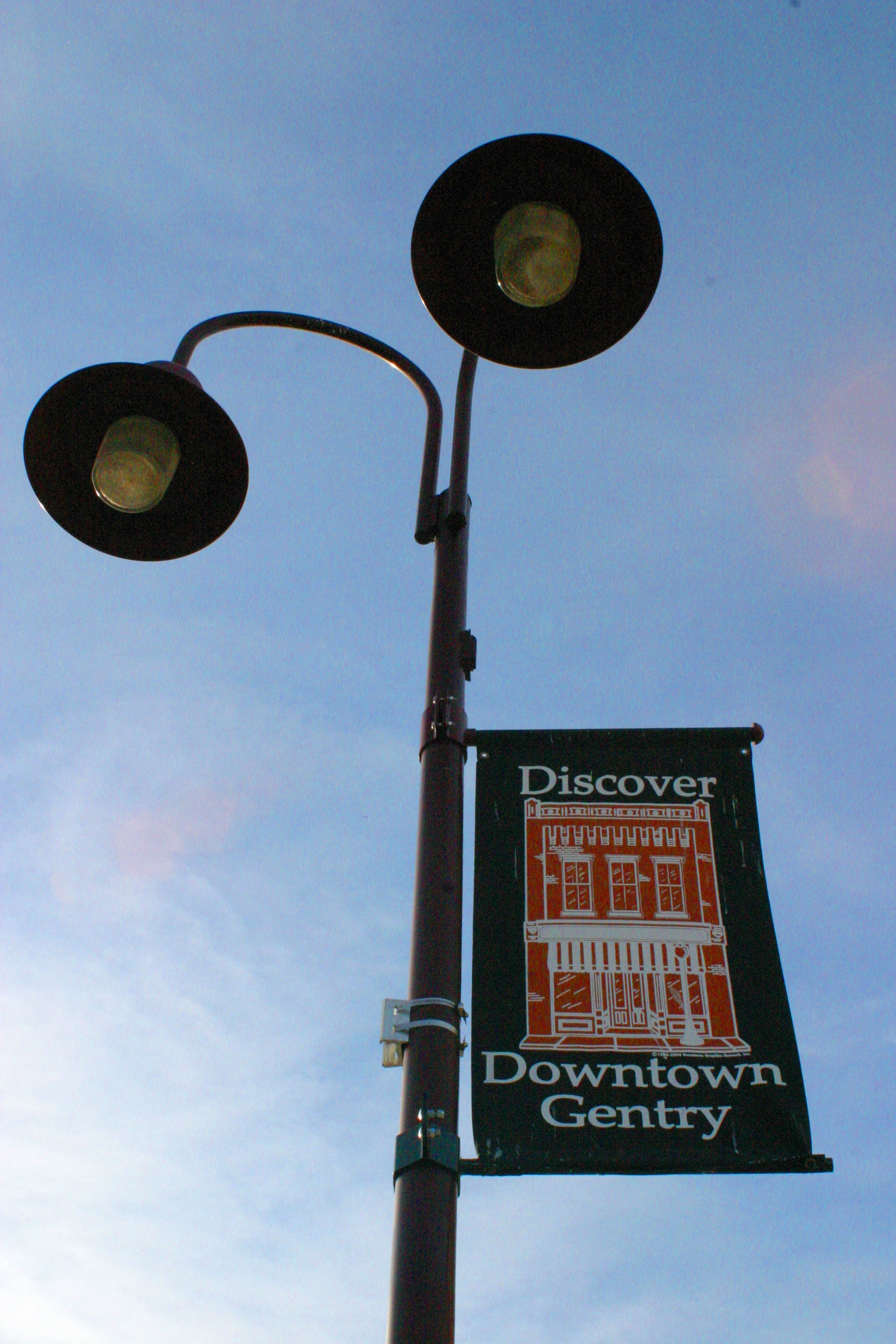
Lamppost in Downtown Gentry, Arkansas

=== 2020 census ===
As of the 2020 census, Gentry had a population of 3,790. The median age was 34.3 years. 27.5% of residents were under the age of 18 and 13.7% of residents were 65 years of age or older. For every 100 females there were 92.4 males, and for every 100 females age 18 and over there were 88.4 males age 18 and over.

0.0% of residents lived in urban areas, while 100.0% lived in rural areas.

There were 1,418 households in Gentry, of which 36.5% had children under the age of 18 living in them. Of all households, 46.4% were married-couple households, 15.8% were households with a male householder and no spouse or partner present, and 30.3% were households with a female householder and no spouse or partner present. About 28.0% of all households were made up of individuals and 12.4% had someone living alone who was 65 years of age or older. There were 1,076 families residing in the city.

There were 1,571 housing units, of which 9.7% were vacant. The homeowner vacancy rate was 2.7% and the rental vacancy rate was 7.8%.

Gentry racial composition
Race	Number	Percentage
White (non-Hispanic)	2,526	66.65%
Black or African American (non-Hispanic)	20	0.53%
Native American	154	4.06%
Asian	143	3.77%
Pacific Islander	3	0.08%
Other/Mixed	320	8.44%
Hispanic or Latino	624	16.46%

=== 2010 census ===
As of 2010 the population of Gentry was 3,158. The racial and ethnic composition of the population was 75.4% non-Hispanic white, 0.2% black, 5.6% Native American, 4.2% Asian, 0.1% Pacific Islander, 8.1% from some other race, 3.3% from two or more races and 12.0% Hispanic or Latino.

=== 2000 census ===
As of the census of 2000, there were 2,165 people, 842 households, and 607 families residing in the city. The population density was 908.3 inhabitants per square mile (350.7/km^{2}). There were 930 housing units at an average density of 390.2 per square mile (150.7/km^{2}). The racial makeup of the city was 89.84% White, 0.18% Black or African American, 3.42% Native American, 0.32% Asian, 3.33% from other races, and 2.91% from two or more races. 5.59% of the population were Hispanic or Latino of any race.

There were 842 households, out of which 35.6% had children under the age of 18 living with them, 54.6% were married couples living together, 13.8% had a female householder with no husband present, and 27.9% were non-families. 25.3% of all households were made up of individuals, and 13.2% had someone living alone who was 65 years of age or older. The average household size was 2.57 and the average family size was 3.06.

In the city, the population was spread out, with 29.1% under the age of 18, 8.8% from 18 to 24, 29.0% from 25 to 44, 19.7% from 45 to 64, and 13.4% who were 65 years of age or older. The median age was 34 years. For every 100 females, there were 90.4 males. For every 100 females age 18 and over, there were 83.9 males.

The median income for a household in the city was $31,765, and the median income for a family was $37,569. Males had a median income of $27,361 versus $20,875 for females. The per capita income for the city was $14,309. About 11.7% of families and 13.2% of the population were below the poverty line, including 15.0% of those under age 18 and 17.6% of those age 65 or over.

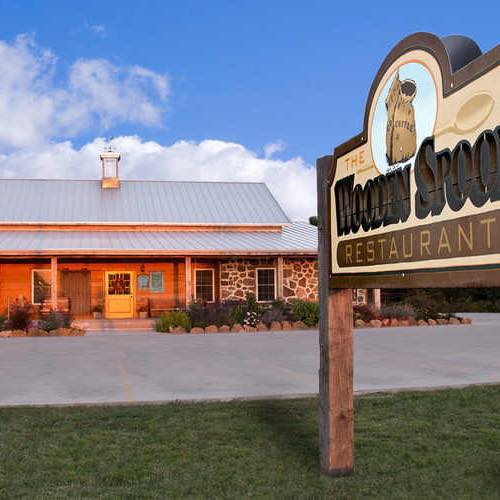
The Wooden Spoon

== Economy ==
More than 160 businesses, including restaurants, bed and breakfast establishments, small industry/manufacturing plants, retail stores and service-oriented businesses, reside in Gentry.

Gentry's largest employer is McKee Foods Corporation, maker of the famous Little Debbie and Sunbelt snacks. McKee Foods celebrated 20 years of manufacturing in Gentry and dedicated a 40,000-square-foot (3,700 m^{2}) expansion to the existing plant in 2002. The company thrift store is located on the corner of Arkansas Highway 59 and Main Street.

Tufco Flooring is also based in Gentry. It was started back in the 1960s by Paul, Donald, and Frank Cox. It now has franchises all over the U.S. with three in Gentry alone: Arkotex Inc., Tufco International, and Tufco Sales and Service. They are producers of industrial flooring, specializing in the food processing industry.

== Education ==
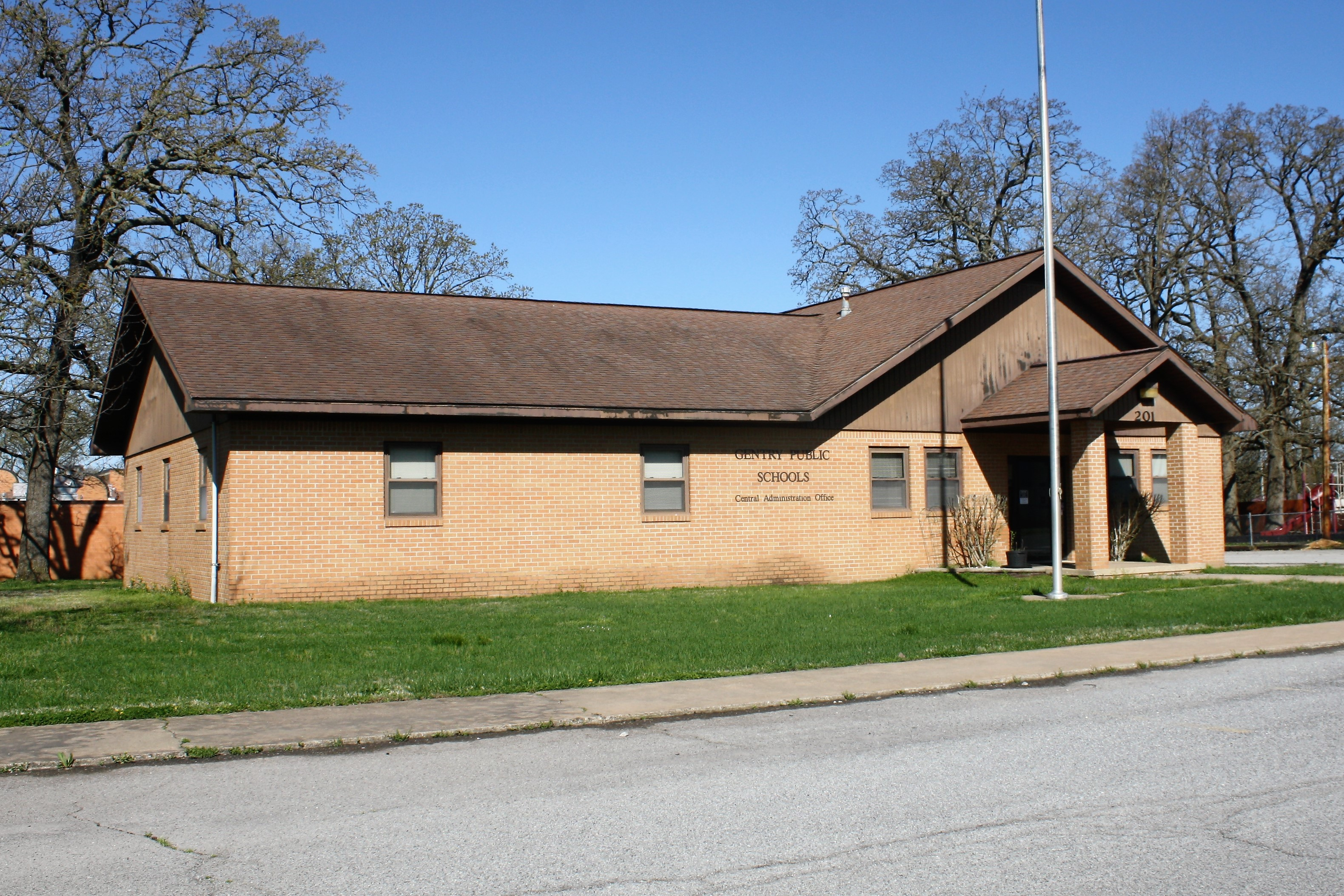
Gentry School District headquarters

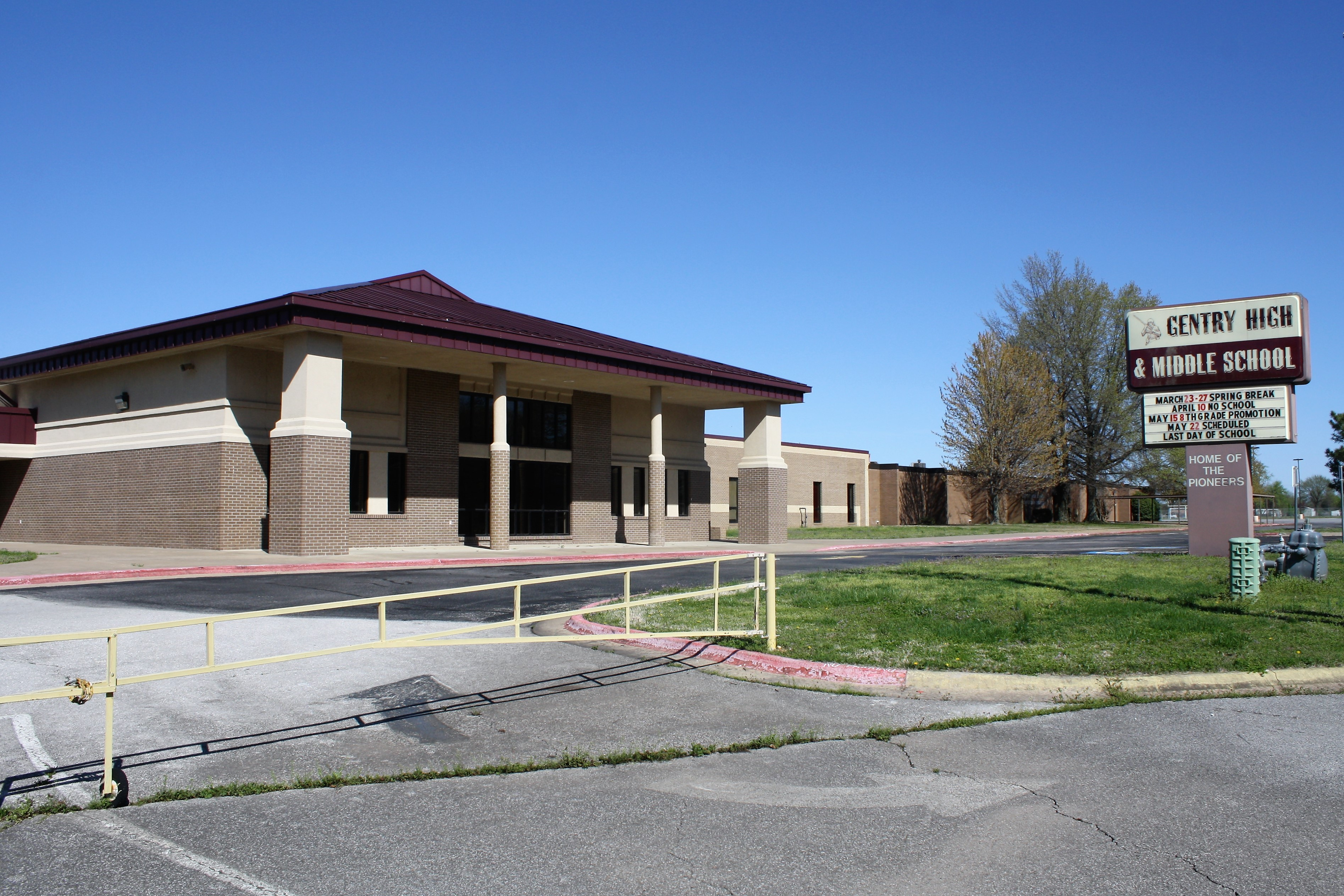
Gentry High School and Gentry Middle School

Public education in almost all of the city is provided by the Gentry School District. A very small portion of the city is zoned to Siloam Springs Schools. The Gentry district supported more than 1,400 students in 2010–11. The district and Gentry High School mascot is the Pioneer, with maroon and white serving as the school colors. Siloam Springs High School is the comprehensive high school of the Siloam Springs district.

Another school system in Gentry is Ozark Adventist School (K-8th grade) and Ozark Adventist Academy (grades 9–12). Both schools are sponsored and operated by the Seventh-day Adventist Church. The academy features a girls and boys dormitory for students to live in that are not living in the local area. These schools also offer some sports programs but focus on academics and Christian living.

== Faith organizations ==
Gentry has an active faith community with churches of many different affiliations, including Seventh-day Adventist Church, United Methodist, Baptist, Church of Christ, Assemblies of God and Mennonite. Most denominations offer programs for youth and families as well as regular worship services. A community-wide Thanksgiving program is hosted each year by one of the local churches.

== Notable people ==
- Jonathan Barnett, a Republican member of the Arkansas House of Representatives from Benton County, currently resides in Gentry.
- Lance Eads, Republican member of the Arkansas House of Representatives for District 88 in Washington County; former resident of Gentry
- Delia Haak, Member of the Arkansas House of Representatives for district 17, formerly district 91, but the number changed due to redistricting
