= List of places in Arkansas: L =

Arkansas State Seal

This list of current cities, towns, unincorporated communities, and other recognized places in the U.S. state of Arkansas whose name begins with the letter L. It also includes information on the number and names of counties in which the place lies, and its lower and upper zip code bounds, if applicable.

== Cities and Towns ==
Name of place	Number of counties	Principal county	Lower zip code	Upper zip code
Lacey	1	Drew County	71655	
Laconia	1	Desha County	72379	
LaCrosse	1	Izard County	72584	
Lacy	1	Bradley County		
Lacy Hill	1	Bradley County		
Ladd	1	Jefferson County	71601	
Ladelle	1	Drew County	71655	
Lafe	1	Greene County	72436	
Lafferty	1	Izard County	72561	
LaGrange	1	Lee County	72352	
La Grue Springs	1	Arkansas County		
Lake Catherine	1	Garland County	71901	
Lake City	1	Craighead County	72437	
Lake Dick	1	Jefferson County	72004	
Lake Elmdale	1	Washington County	72764	
Lake Farm	1	Jefferson County		
Lake Frances	1	Benton County		
Lakehall	1	Chicot County	71653	
Lake Hamilton	1	Garland County	71913	
Lakeport	1	Chicot County	71640	
Lake Ridge	1	Phillips County		
Lakeside	1	Garland County	71901	
Lakeside	1	Ouachita County	71701	
Lakeside	1	St. Francis County		
Lakeside	1	Saline County		
Lakeview	1	Baxter County	72642	
Lake View	1	Craighead County	72437	
Lake View	1	Phillips County	72342	
Lakeview	1	Yell County	72834	
Lake Village	1	Chicot County	71653	
Lakeway	1	Marion County	72687	
Lakewood	1	Jefferson County	72004	
Lamar	1	Johnson County	72846	
Lamartine	1	Columbia County	71770	
Lambert	1	Hot Spring County	71929	
Lambethville	1	Crittenden County		
Lambrick Spur	1	Johnson County		
Lambrook	1	Phillips County	72353	
Lanark	1	Bradley County	71631	
Landers	1	Hot Spring County		
Landers	1	Poinsett County	72472	
Landis	1	Searcy County	72650	
Laneburg	1	Nevada County	71844	
Lanesport	1	Little River County	71836	
Langford	1	Jefferson County		
Langley	1	Pike County	71952	
L'Anguille	1	Cross County		
Lansing	1	Crittenden County	72327	
Lanty	1	Conway County	72110	
Lapile	1	Union County	71765	
Larkin	1	Izard County	72584	
Larue	1	Benton County	72756	
Latour	1	Phillips County	72355	
Latour Junction	1	Phillips County		
Laughlin	1	Columbia County		
Lauratown	1	Lawrence County		
Lavaca	1	Sebastian County	72941	
Lawrenceville	1	Monroe County	72069	
Lawson	1	Union County	71750	
Layne	1	Sharp County	72532	
Leachville	1	Mississippi County	72438	
Lead Hill	1	Boone County	72644	
Lebanon	1	Searcy County	72650	
Lebanon	1	Sevier County	71846	
Ledwidge	1	Perry County		
Lee Creek	1	Crawford County	72934	
Lehi	1	Crittenden County	72364	
Leitner	1	Jefferson County	71601	
Leland	1	Chicot County		
Lemsford	1	Mississippi County		
Lenham	1	Grant County		
Lennie	1	Mississippi County	72442	
Lenox	1	Clark County		
Leola	1	Grant County	72084	
Leonard	1	Clay County	72461	
Lepanto	1	Poinsett County	72354	
Lepanto Junction	1	Craighead County		
Lerch	1	Lafayette County		
Leslie	1	Searcy County	72645	
Lester	1	Craighead County		
Lester	1	Ouachita County	71726	
Lester Junction	1	Ouachita County		
Lesterville	1	Randolph County		
Letchworth	1	Prairie County		
Letona	1	White County	72085	
Levesque	1	Cross County		
Lewis	1	Drew County		
Lewis	1	Scott County		
Lewisburg	1	Conway County	72110	
Lewisville	1	Lafayette County	71845	
Lexa	1	Phillips County	72355	
Lexa Junction	1	Phillips County		
Lexington	1	Stone County	72153	
Liberty	1	Logan County		
Liberty	1	Montgomery County		
Liberty	1	Ouachita County	71751	
Liberty	1	Sebastian County		
Liberty Hall	1	Yell County	72834	
Liberty Valley	1	White County	72010	
Lick Branch	1	Boone County		
Lick Mountain	1	Conway County	72027	
Light	1	Greene County	72439	
Lignite	1	Saline County		
Limedale	1	Independence County	72501	
Limedale Junction	1	Independence County		
Limestone	1	Newton County	72628	
Lincoln	1	Washington County	72744	
Linder	1	Faulkner County	72058	
Lindsey	1	Lawrence County		
Linwood	1	Jefferson County	71659	
Lisbon	1	Union County	71730	
Little Arkansaw	1	Boone County		
Little Bay	1	Calhoun County		
Little Dixie	1	Prairie County	72040	
Little Flock	1	Benton County	72756	
Little Garnett	1	Lincoln County		
Little Green Store	1	Mississippi County		
Little Italy	2	Perry County	72016	
Little Italy	2	Pulaski County	72135	
Little Red	1	White County	72121	
Little River	1	Mississippi County	72442	
Little River Country Club	1	Little River County	71866	
Little Rock	1	Pulaski County	72200	72297
Little Rock Air Force Base	1	Pulaski County	72076	
Little Texas	1	Scott County		
Littrel Ford	1	Carroll County		
Lloyd Ford	1	Calhoun County		
Loafer	1	Newton County		
Locke	1	Crawford County	72946	
Lockesburg	1	Sevier County	71846	
Lockheart	1	Independence County		
Locust Bayou	1	Calhoun County	71701	
Locust Grove	1	Independence County	72550	
Lodge Corner	1	Arkansas County	72160	
Lodi	1	Pike County	71943	
Lofton	1	Garland County		
Logan	1	Benton County		
Lollie	1	Faulkner County	72106	
London	1	Pope County	72847	
Lone	1	Logan County		
Lone Grove	1	Conway County		
Lonelm	1	Franklin County	72947	
Lone Pine	1	Searcy County	72650	
Lone Pine	1	Yell County		
Lone Rock	1	Baxter County		
Lone Star	1	Carroll County		
Lone Star	1	Izard County		
Long	1	Little River County		
Longino	1	St. Francis County		
Longview	1	Bradley County		
Lono	1	Hot Spring County	72084	
Lonoke	1	Lonoke County	72086	
Lonsdale	1	Garland County	72087	
Lookout	1	Arkansas County		
Lookout Store	1	Monroe County	72134	
Lorado	1	Greene County	72401	
Lorays	1	Desha County		
Lorine	1	Randolph County	72455	
Lost Bridge Village	1	Benton County		
Lost Corner	1	Pope County	72080	
Lou	1	Mississippi County		
Louann	1	Ouachita County	71751	
Louise	1	Crittenden County		
Love	1	Izard County	72532	
Love Creek	1	Clark County		
Lowden	1	Mississippi County	72319	
Lowell	1	Benton County	72745	
Lower Poplar Ridge	1	Craighead County	72414	
Lowes Boydsville	1	Clay County	72461	
Low Gap	1	Newton County	72641	
Lowry	1	Boone County		
Loy	1	Madison County		
Luber	1	Stone County	72551	
Lucas	1	Logan County	72927	
Lucerne	1	St. Francis County		
Ludwig	1	Johnson County	72830	
Lumber	1	Columbia County	71770	
Luna	1	Chicot County	71653	
Lundell	1	Phillips County	72367	
Lunenburg	1	Izard County	72556	
Lunet	1	Ouachita County		
Lunsford	1	Craighead County	72437	
Lunsford Corner	1	Pulaski County	72135	
Lurton	1	Newton County	72856	
Lutherville	1	Johnson County	72846	
Luxora	1	Mississippi County	72358	
Lydalisk	1	Stone County		
Lydesdale	1	Columbia County	71753	
Lynn	1	Lawrence County	72440	

== Townships ==
Name of place	Number of counties	Principal county	Lower zip code	Upper zip code
LaCrosse Township	1	Izard County		
La Fave Township	1	Scott County		
Lafayette Township	1	Crawford County		
Lafayette Township	1	Lonoke County		
Lafayette Township	1	Ouachita County		
Lafayette Township	1	Scott County		
Lafferty Township	1	Izard County		
La Grange Township	1	Lafayette County		
La Grue Township	1	Arkansas County		
Lake Township	1	Greene County		
Lake Township	1	Perry County		
Lake Township	1	Phillips County		
Lake City Township	1	Craighead County		
Lake Hamilton Township	1	Garland County		
Lamar Township	1	Madison County		
Lamar Township	1	Yell County		
Lamb Township	1	Scott County		
Lancaster Township	1	Crawford County		
L'Anguille Township	1	Phillips County		
L'Anguille Township	1	St. Francis County		
Lapile Township	1	Union County		
Lave Creek Township	1	Sharp County		
Laverna Township	1	Montgomery County		
Lawrence Township	1	Lawrence County		
Leake Township	1	Nevada County		
Lee Township	1	Boone County		
Lee Township	1	Cleveland County		
Lee Township	1	Garland County		
Lee Township	1	Johnson County		
Lees Creek Township	1	Crawford County		
Lee's Creek Township	1	Washington County		
Lemmons Township	1	Clay County		
Lester Township	1	Craighead County		
Leverney Township	1	Montgomery County		
Lewis Township	1	Scott County		
Liberty Township	1	Carroll County		
Liberty Township	1	Dallas County		
Liberty Township	1	Independence County		
Liberty Township	1	Lee County		
Liberty Township	1	Marion County		
Liberty Township	1	Ouachita County		
Liberty Township	1	Pope County		
Liberty Township	1	Saline County		
Liberty Township	1	Stone County		
Liberty Township	1	Van Buren County		
Liberty Township	1	White County		
Lick Creek Township	1	Little River County		
Lick Mountain Township	1	Conway County		
Liddell Township	1	Clay County		
Limestone Township	1	Franklin County		
Lincoln Township	1	Madison County		
Lincoln Township	1	Newton County		
Lincoln Township	1	Washington County		
Linn Creek Township	1	Van Buren County		
Litteral Township	1	Washington County		
Little Black Township	1	Randolph County		
Little River Township	1	Little River County		
Little River Township	1	Mississippi County		
Little River Township	1	Poinsett County		
Little Texas Township	1	Craighead County		
Little Texas Township	1	Scott County		
Live Oak Township	1	Drew County		
Locke Township	1	Crawford County		
Locust Bayou Township	1	Calhoun County		
Locust Grove Township	1	Stone County		
Logan Township	1	Baxter County		
Logan Township	1	Benton County		
Logan Township	1	Independence County		
Logan Township	1	Logan County		
Lone Hill Township	1	Hot Spring County		
Lone Pine Township	1	Lincoln County		
Lone Rock Township	1	Baxter County		
Long Creek Township	1	Boone County		
Long Creek Township	1	Carroll County		
Long Creek Township	1	Searcy County		
Longview Township	1	Ashley County		
Lon Norris Township	1	Sebastian County		
Lonoke Township	1	Lonoke County		
Lower North Township	1	Sharp County		
Lower Spring Township	1	Searcy County		
Lower Surrounded Hill Township	1	Prairie County		
Low Gap Township	1	Johnson County		
Low Gap Township	1	Newton County		
Lucas Township	1	Crittenden County		
Lunenburg Township	1	Izard County		
Lunsford Township	1	Poinsett County		
