= List of places in Arkansas: V =

Arkansas State Seal

This list of current cities, towns, unincorporated communities, and other recognized places in the U.S. state of Arkansas whose name begins with the letter V. It also includes information on the number and names of counties in which the place lies, and its lower and upper zip code bounds, if applicable.

== Cities and Towns ==
| Name of place | Number of counties | Principal county | Lower zip code | Upper zip code |
|---|---|---|---|---|
| Vaden | 1 | Clark County | | |
| Vail | 2 | Craighead County | 72438 | |
| Vail | 2 | Mississippi County | 72438 | |
| Valentine | 1 | Pulaski County | | |
| Valley Hill | 1 | Cleburne County | 72067 | |
| Valley Junction | 1 | Drew County | | |
| Valley Springs | 1 | Boone County | 72682 | |
| Valley View | 1 | Craighead County | 72401 | |
| Vallier | 1 | Arkansas County | | |
| Van | 1 | Arkansas County | 72172 | |
| Van Buren | 1 | Crawford County | 72956 | 72957 |
| Vance | 1 | Jackson County | | |
| Vandervoort | 1 | Polk County | 71972 | |
| Vanduzer | 1 | Ouachita County | | |
| Vanity Corner | 1 | White County | 72143 | |
| Vanndale | 1 | Cross County | 72387 | |
| Varner | 1 | Lincoln County | | |
| Vaucluse | 1 | Chicot County | | |
| Vaughn | 1 | Benton County | 72712 | |
| Velie | 1 | Ouachita County | 71701 | |
| Velvet Ridge | 1 | White County | 72010 | |
| Vendor | 1 | Newton County | 72683 | |
| Venice | 1 | Ashley County | | |
| Venus | 1 | Madison County | | |
| Verona | 1 | Marion County | 72618 | |
| Vesta | 1 | Franklin County | 72933 | |
| Vestal | 1 | Desha County | | |
| Veterans Administration Facility | 1 | Pulaski County | 72114 | |
| Vick | 1 | Bradley County | 71647 | |
| Victor | 1 | Pope County | | |
| Victoria | 1 | Mississippi County | 72370 | |
| Victoria | 1 | Union County | | |
| Vidette | 1 | Fulton County | | |
| Village | 1 | Columbia County | 71769 | |
| Village Junction | 1 | Columbia County | | |
| Vilonia | 1 | Faulkner County | 72173 | |
| Vimy Ridge | 1 | Saline County | 72002 | |
| Vincent | 1 | Crittenden County | 72327 | |
| Vine Prairie | 1 | Crawford County | 72947 | |
| Vineyard | 1 | Lee County | 72360 | |
| Vineygrove | 1 | Washington County | 72753 | |
| Viola | 1 | Fulton County | 72583 | |
| Violet Hill | 1 | Izard County | 72584 | |

== Townships ==
| Name of place | Number of counties | Principal county | Lower zip code | Upper zip code |
|---|---|---|---|---|
| Valley Township | 1 | Cleburne County | | |
| Valley Township | 1 | Garland County | | |
| Valley Township | 1 | Hot Spring County | | |
| Valley Township | 1 | Madison County | | |
| Valley Township | 1 | Ouachita County | | |
| Valley Township | 1 | Pope County | | |
| Valley Township | 1 | Washington County | | |
| Van Buren Township | 1 | Crawford County | | |
| Van Buren Township | 1 | Newton County | | |
| Van Buren Township | 1 | Union County | | |
| Vaughn Township | 1 | Independence County | | |
| Vaugine Township | 1 | Jefferson County | 71601 | 71603 |
| Veasey Township | 1 | Drew County | | |
| Velvet Ridge Township | 1 | White County | | |
| Venus Township | 1 | Madison County | | |
| Victoria Township | 1 | Jefferson County | | |
| Vidette Township | 1 | Fulton County | | |
| Village Township | 1 | Columbia County | | |
| Village Township | 1 | Jackson County | | |
| Villemont Township | 1 | Jefferson County | | |
| Vine Prairie Township | 1 | Crawford County | | |
| Vineyard Township | 1 | Washington County | | |
| Violet Hill Township | 1 | Izard County | | |
