= Letchworth (disambiguation) =

Letchworth is a town in Hertfordshire, England.

Letchworth may also refer to:

== Places ==
- Letchworth, Arkansas, a place in the United States
- Letchworth State Park, a state park in New York, United States
- Letchworth Village, a developmental-disability institution in New York, United States

== People with the surname ==
- Eileen Letchworth (1922-2003), American actress
- Elizabeth Baldwin Letchworth (b.1959), American lobbyist
- William Pryor Letchworth (1823-1910), American businessman

== Other uses ==
- Letchworth High School, Gainesville, Florida, United States
- SS Letchworth, a number of steamships
