= Sam Faubus =

American farmer and activist

- Young Sam Faubus
- Born: October 24, 1887; Madison County, Arkansas, U.S.
- Died: August 24, 1966 (aged 78)
- Other names: "Little Sam"
- Occupations: small farmer, seasonal agricultural worker, journeyman hacker, miner
- Known for: political activism

John Samuel Faubus (October 24, 1887 – August 24, 1966) was an American small farmer and founder of one of Arkansas' few chapters of the Socialist Party of America. He was the father of Governor of Arkansas Orval E. Faubus.

== Biography ==
=== Early life ===
He was born in Madison County on Mill Creek south of Combs in the Ozark Mountains, Arkansas, to William Henry Faubus and Malinda (née Sparks) Faubus, who had seven children. His father died in the winter of 1900 from pneumonia shortly after relocating to Greasy Creek, north of Combs, and the widow married John Nelson; she gave birth to another eight children. Altogether, John Samuel Faubus had fifteen siblings and stepsiblings and was referred to as Sam.

He received little education, and when he was seventeen, he went to work as a journeyman hacker, hewing railroad crossties. However, Sam developed a habit of reading books and became self-educated; later, he became a regular correspondent to local newspapers. In his youth, Sam was easy-going, in his later years he was characterized as domineering and strong-minded.

After Faubus turned twenty-one, he married Addie Joslin (1892–1936) in 1908, daughter of Thomas Joslin and Sarah Thornberry, and they had three sons, Orval, Darrow, and Elvin, and three daughters, Bonnie, Connie, and Betty. He gave his oldest son Orval the middle name Eugene to honor the Socialist Party of America founder, Eugene V. Debs; another son, Darrow Doyle, was named after well known the time labor lawyer Clarence Darrow; and a third son, Elvin Carl, received a middle name after Karl Marx.

The Faubuses were subsistence farmers and toiled on their homesteaded thin-soiled upland farm in the Ozark Mountain country to provide their children with food and basic necessities; Sam also did menial work to earn money while Addie looked after children. He constantly searched for better paying jobs; he did itinerant agricultural work in the Midwest and Canada, and worked in a lead mine at Picher, Oklahoma, for two years.

=== Political activism ===
Hardships politically radicalized Faubus, and in his older days he reminisced, "I worked in my younger days as a tiemaker—not the wearing kind, but the kind that railroads use. I made them for 10 cents a piece. That's why I became a liberal. I don't like slave labor, and that's just what it was."

Under the influence of his older and more political savvy neighbor, O. T. Green, Sam joined the Socialist Party of America. In May 1910, he and his friend Arch Cornett, a local teacher, founded the Mill Creek Local of the Socialist Party in Combs with ten members; at an all-time high, membership was close to 30, including Addie Faubus. Sam Faubus was a firm opponent of the U.S. involvement in World War I and once was arrested with Arch Cornett for distributing anti-war literature and charged with the Sedition Act of 1918 violation. The end of the war helped him to escape imprisonment. He also advocated introduction of the graduated income tax, old age benefits, supported racial equality (he despised and opposed segregation and racism, viewing it as plots to divide the working class), repeal of restricting voting poll tax, and women's suffrage, along with other socialists in Arkansas. In the 1950s, he supported desegregation.

Faubus's son, Orval Faubus, being the Governor of Arkansas, became nationally and internationally controversial for seeking to oppose the 1957 integration of Central High School in the state capital of Little Rock. Sam Faubus disapproved of Orval's actions during the integration crisis and privately conveyed his position to him. Unbeknownst to his son, he wrote letters in support of desegregation to the Arkansas Gazette signed by a pseudonym, Jimmie Higgins, which was the Socialist Party slang for a novice member. At that time, Sam Faubus already changed his political standing, becoming a Franklin Roosevelt New Deal Democrat. Ultimately, the Federal Government intervened, and nine African American students known as the Little Rock Nine went on to graduate from Little Rock Central High School.

=== Later years ===
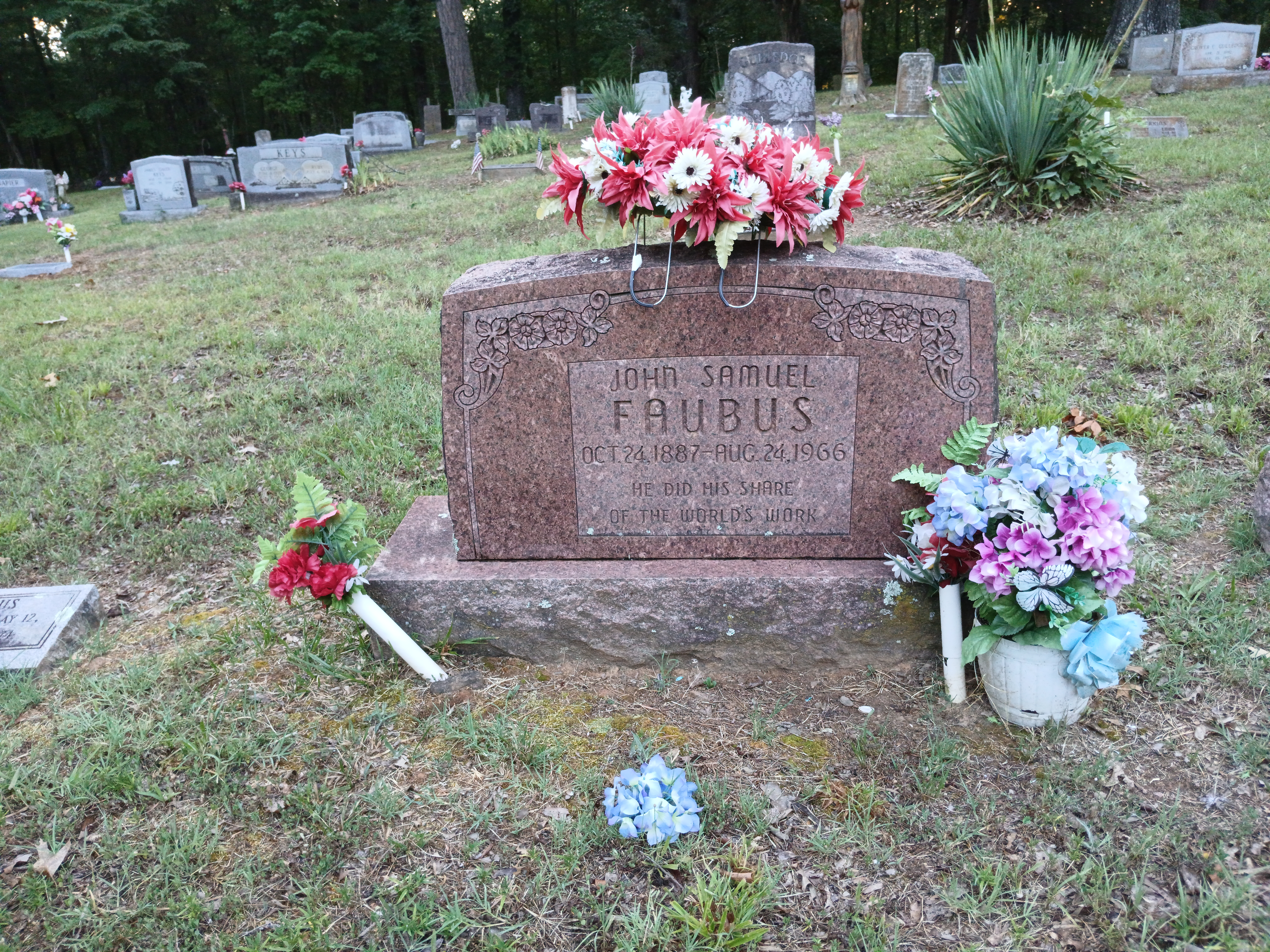
Faubus's grave in the Combs Cemetery, Combs, Arkansas

After he was widowed in 1936, Faubus married in 1952 a widow, Maudie Blanch Jostmeyer Wonders, and lived on a ten-acre farm on Milk Creek where he raised chickens. The neighbors called him "Uncle Sam" after Orval Faubus became governor. John Samuel Faubus died from lymphatic cancer on August 24, 1966. The Arkansas Gazette wrote about him, "Sam Faubus would have stood out in any time, that of his own father, his father's father, anytime. The Ozark mountaineers needed such a man who could articulate their anger at the exploitative economic system that plagued their lives."
