= Crosses, Arkansas =

- Unincorporated community
- Location within Arkansas Location within the United States
- Coordinates: 35°52′27″N 93°54′41″W
- Country: United States
- State: Arkansas
- County: Madison
- Township: Valley
- Elevation: 1,358 ft (414 m)
- Time zone: UTC-6 (Central (CST))
  - Summer (DST): UTC-5 (CDT)
- ZIP code: 72727
- Area code: 479
- GNIS feature ID: 71291

Crosses is an unincorporated community in Valley Township, Madison County, Arkansas, United States, located at the intersection of Arkansas Highways 16 and Highway 295.

== History ==
The community has the name of one Mr. Cross, a pioneer citizen.

In 2012, Arkansas head football coach Bobby Petrino was involved in a motorcycle crash while sliding off Highway 16 near Crosses, his passenger being former Arkansas All-SEC volleyball player Jessica Dorrell. He was subsequently fired from his coaching job for lying about the accident to the school.
