= List of places in Arkansas: K =

Arkansas State Seal

This list of current cities, towns, unincorporated communities, and other recognized places in the U.S. state of Arkansas whose name begins with the letter K. It also includes information on the number and names of counties in which the place lies, and its lower and upper zip code bounds, if applicable.

== Cities and towns ==
Name of place	Number of counties	Principal county	Lower zip code	Upper zip code
Kahoka	1	Stone County	72560	
Kalamazoo	1	Logan County		
Kansas	1	Clark County		
Kate	1	Crittenden County		
Kay	1	Prairie County		
Kay	1	Searcy County		
Kearney	1	Jefferson County	72132	
Kedron	1	Cleveland County	71665	
Keener	1	Boone County		
Keiser	1	Mississippi County	72351	
Kellum	1	Sevier County	71832	
Kelso	1	Desha County	71674	
Kenova	1	Union County	71762	
Kensett	1	White County	72082	
Kent	1	Ouachita County	71701	
Kentucky	1	Saline County	72015	
Kenwood	1	Conway County	72823	
Kenyon	1	Jackson County		
Keo	1	Lonoke County	72083	
Kerlin	1	Columbia County	71753	
Kerr	1	Lonoke County	72142	
Kiblah	1	Miller County	71044	
Kibler	1	Crawford County	72956	
Killin	1	Drew County		
Kimball	1	Ashley County		
Kimberley	1	Pike County	71958	
Kinard	1	Union County		
Kindall	1	Phillips County	72374	
King	1	Fulton County		
King	1	Sevier County		
King Mills	1	Sharp County	72542	
Kings	1	Sevier County	71841	
Kingsland	1	Cleveland County	71652	
Kingston	1	Madison County	72742	
Kingston	1	Yell County	72853	
Kingtown	1	Phillips County	72366	
Kingwood	1	Pulaski County		
Kinton	1	St. Francis County	72394	
Kirby	1	Pike County	71950	
Kirkland	1	Ouachita County	71751	
Kittle	1	Fulton County	72554	
Kittlers	1	Arkansas County		
Kizer	1	Lafayette County	71826	
Knob	1	Clay County	72443	
Knob Creek	1	Izard County	72556	
Knobel	1	Clay County	72435	
Knowlton	1	Desha County	72328	
Knoxville	1	Clark County		
Knoxville	1	Johnson County	72845	
Knoxville Junction	1	Johnson County		
Koch Ridge	1	Van Buren County	72031	
Kokomo	1	Lee County	72320	
Kramer	1	Woodruff County	72006	
Kress City	1	Lafayette County		
Kurdo	1	Desha County	71674	

== Townships ==
Name of place	Number of counties	Principal county	Lower zip code	Upper zip code
Keaton Township	1	Arkansas County		
Keener Township	1	Scott County		
Keesee Township	1	Marion County		
Keeter Township	1	Marion County		
Keevil Township	1	Monroe County		
Kenney Township	1	Perry County		
Kensett Township	1	White County		
Kentucky Township	1	Madison County		
Kentucky Township	1	Newton County		
Kentucky Township	1	Saline County		
Kentucky Township	1	White County		
Kibler Township	1	Crawford County		
Kilgore Township	1	Clay County		
Kimbrough Township	1	Lincoln County		
King Township	1	Johnson County		
Kingsland Township	1	Cleveland County		
Kings River Township	1	Carroll County		
Kings River Township	1	Madison County		
Knob Township	1	Clay County		
