= Orval Faubus =

Governor of Arkansas 1955–1967 (1910–1994)

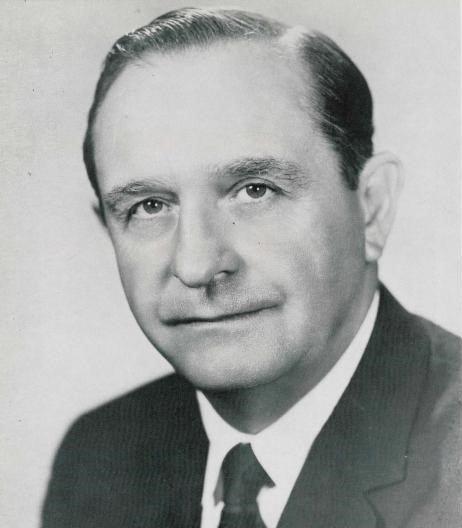
- Official portrait, 1959

36th Governor of Arkansas
- In office January 11, 1955 – January 10, 1967
- Lieutenant: Nathan Green Gordon
- Preceded by: Francis Cherry
- Succeeded by: Winthrop Rockefeller

Personal details
- Born: Orval Eugene Faubus; January 7, 1910 Madison County, Arkansas, U.S.
- Died: December 14, 1994 (aged 84) Conway, Arkansas, U.S.
- Resting place: Combs, Arkansas, U.S.
- Party: Democratic
- Spouses: Alta Haskins (m. 1931; div. 1969) Elizabeth Westmoreland (m. 1969; died 1983) Jan Wittenburg (m. 1986)
- Children: Farrell

Military service
- Branch: United States Army
- Years of service: 1942–1946
- Rank: Major
- Unit: 320th Infantry Regiment
- Campaigns: World War II; Operation Overlord; Liberation of France; Siegfried Line campaign; Battle of the Bulge; Western Allied invasion of Germany

Orval Eugene Faubus (/ˈfɔːbəs/ FAW-bəs; January 7, 1910 – December 14, 1994) was an American politician who served as the 36th governor of Arkansas from 1955 to 1967, as a member of the Democratic Party. He is best known for the 1957 Little Rock Crisis, when he refused to comply with a decision of the U.S. Supreme Court in the 1954 case Brown v. Board of Education, and ordered the Arkansas National Guard to prevent black students from attending Little Rock Central High School. He was elected to six two-year terms as governor.

== Early life and career ==
Orval Eugene Faubus was born in the northwest corner of Arkansas near the village of Combs to John Samuel and Addie (née Joslen) Faubus. Although his father, Sam Faubus, was a socialist, and enrolled Orval at the socialist Commonwealth College, the latter went on to pursue a very different political path from that of his father.

Faubus's first political race was in 1936 when he contested a seat in the Arkansas House of Representatives, which he lost. He was urged to challenge the result but declined, which earned him the gratitude of the Democratic Party. As a result, he was elected circuit clerk and recorder of Madison County, a post he held for two terms.

His book, In This Faraway Land, documents the military period of his life. He was active in veterans' causes for the remainder of his life. When Faubus returned from the war, he cultivated ties with leaders of Arkansas' Democratic Party, particularly with progressive reform Governor Sid McMath, leader of the post-war "GI Revolt" against corruption, under whom he served as director of the state's highway commission. Meanwhile, conservative Francis Cherry defeated McMath's bid for a third term in the 1952 Democratic primary. Cherry became unpopular with voters, and Faubus challenged him in the 1954 primary.

== 1954 gubernatorial election ==
In the 1954 campaign, Faubus was compelled to defend his attendance at the defunct Commonwealth College in Mena, as well as his early political upbringing. Commonwealth College had been formed by leftist academic and social activists, some of whom later were revealed to have had close ties with the Communist Party USA. Most of those who attended and taught there were idealistic young people who sought an education or, in the case of the faculty, a job which came with room and board.

=== Democratic primary ===
During the runoff, Cherry and his surrogates accused Faubus of having attended a "communist" school and implied that his sympathies remained leftist. Faubus at first denied attending, and then admitted enrolling "for only a few weeks". Later, it was shown that he had remained at the school for more than a year, earned good grades, and was elected student body president. Faubus led a group of students who testified on behalf of the college's accreditation before the state legislature. Nevertheless, efforts to paint the candidate as a communist sympathizer backfired in a climate of growing resentment against such allegations. Faubus narrowly defeated Cherry to win the Democratic gubernatorial nomination. Relations were cool between the two men for years, but when Cherry died in 1965, Faubus put politics aside and was magnanimous in praising his predecessor.

=== General election ===
In the 1954 general election campaign against Little Rock Mayor Pratt Remmel, Faubus secured the endorsement of the previous 1950 and 1952 Republican gubernatorial nominee, Jefferson W. Speck, a planter from Mississippi County in eastern Arkansas. Faubus defeated Remmel by a 63% to 37% percent margin. Faubus rejected his father's radicalism for the more mainline New Deal, a pragmatic move. He was elected governor as a liberal Democrat. A moderate on racial issues, he adopted racial policies that were palatable to influential white voters in the Delta region as part of a strategy to effect key social reforms and economic growth in Arkansas.

== Governor of Arkansas, 1955–1967 ==
The 1954 election made Faubus sensitive to attacks from the political right. It has been suggested that this sensitivity contributed to his later stance against integration when he was challenged by segregationist elements within his own party. Faubus's challenger in the 1956 gubernatorial primary, Jim Johnson, called Faubus "a traitor to the Southern way of life," spurring Faubus to add a line to his standard speech: "No school district will be forced to mix the races as long as I am governor of Arkansas."

=== Little Rock crisis ===
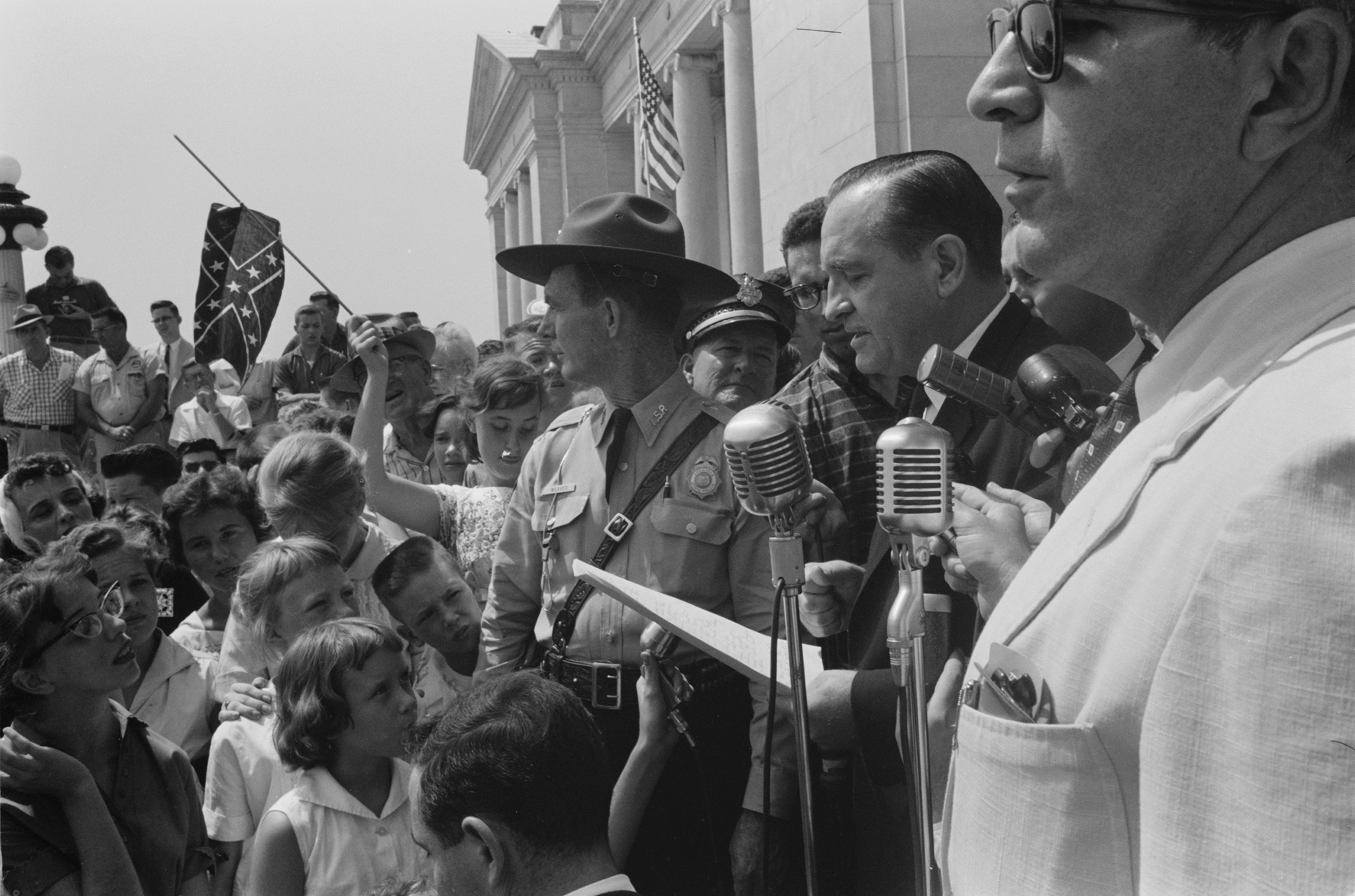
Faubus speaking to a crowd protesting the integration of Little Rock schools

Faubus's name became internationally known during the Little Rock Crisis of 1957, when he used the Arkansas National Guard to stop African Americans from attending Little Rock Central High School as part of federally ordered racial desegregation.

Many observers argued that Faubus's fight in Little Rock against the 1954 Brown v. Board of Education decision by the U.S. Supreme Court that separate schools were inherently unequal was motivated by considerations of political gain. The ensuing battle helped to shield him from the political fallout from a tax increase. Journalist Harry Ashmore (who won a Pulitzer Prize for his columns on the subject) portrayed the fight over Central High as a crisis manufactured by Faubus. Ashmore said that Faubus used the Guard to keep black people out of Central High School because he was frustrated by the success his political opponents were having in using segregationist rhetoric to arouse white voters.

Faubus's decision led to a showdown with President Dwight D. Eisenhower and former Governor Sid McMath. On September 5, 1957, Eisenhower sent a telegram to Faubus in which he wrote "The only assurance I can give you is that the Federal Constitution will be upheld by me by every legal means at my command." This was a response to Faubus's concerns about being taken into custody and his telephones being wired. Eisenhower did say in his telegram that the Department of Justice was collecting facts as to why there was a failure to comply with the courts. This led to the September 14 conference where Faubus and Eisenhower discussed the Court order in Newport, Rhode Island. The quoted "friendly and constructive discussion" led to Faubus claiming his desire to comply with his duty to the Constitution, personal opinions aside. Faubus did express his hope that the Department of Justice would be patient. He did stay true to his word and on September 21, President Eisenhower released a statement which announced that Faubus had withdrawn his troops, the Little Rock School Board was carrying out desegregation plans, and local law was ready to keep order.

External video
- Mike Wallace Interview with Governor Orval Faubus, September 15, 1957, C-SPAN

On September 23, however, Little Rock Mayor Woodrow W. Mann sent a telegram to Eisenhower stating a mob had formed at Central High School. State police made efforts to control the mob, but for the safety of the newly enrolled children, they were sent home. The mayor stressed how this was a planned act and that the principal agitator, Jimmy Karam, was an associate of Governor Faubus. The mayor further stated his belief that there was no way the governor could not have been aware of this planned attack. In October 1957, Eisenhower federalized the Arkansas National Guard and ordered them to return to their armories which effectively removed them from Faubus's control. Eisenhower then sent elements of the 101st Airborne Division to Arkansas to protect the black students and enforce the federal court order. The Arkansas National Guard later took over protection duties from the 101st Airborne Division. In retaliation, Faubus shut down Little Rock high schools for the 1958–1959 school year. This is often referred to as "The Lost Year" in Little Rock.

"Faubus contended that the 1954 Brown decision was illegal because it allowed the federal courts to usurp control of schools from the states." The State knew forced integration by the federal government was going to meet with unfavorable results from the Little Rock public. In his opinion, Faubus was acting in the State's best interest at the time.

Though Faubus later lost general popularity as a result of his support for segregation, at the time he was included among the "Ten Men in the World Most Admired by Americans", according to Gallup's most admired man and woman poll for 1958. This dichotomy was later summed up as follows: Faubus was both the "best loved" and "most hated" of Arkansas politicians of the second half of the twentieth century.

The Little Rock Crisis inspired the song "Fables of Faubus" by jazz artist Charles Mingus and poem “Little Rock" by Cuban poet Nicolás Guillén.

=== Faubus-style politics ===
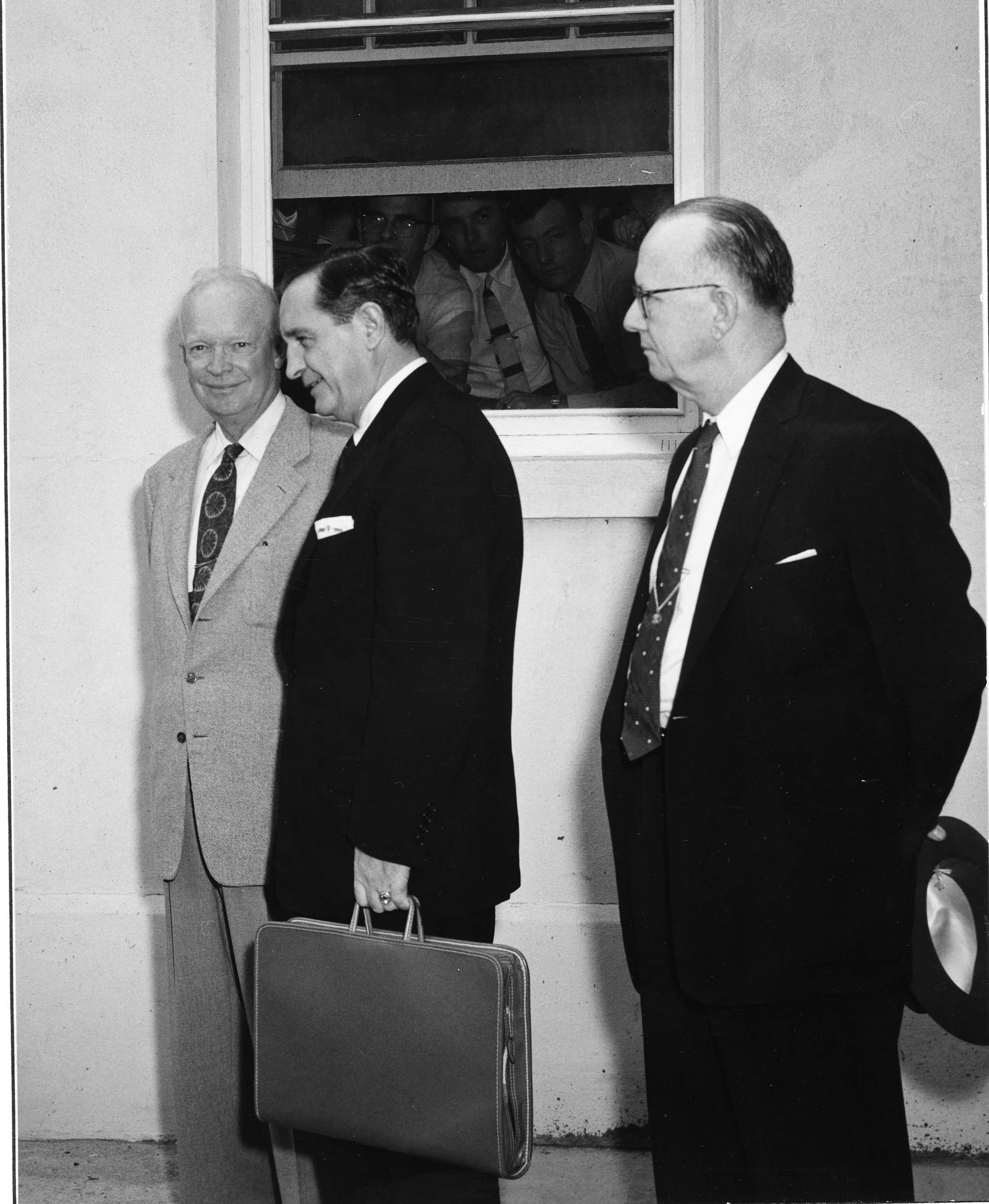
Faubus with President Dwight D. Eisenhower and Arkansas Congressman Brooks Hays after a meeting on the Little Rock school crisis at the Newport Naval Base, September 14, 1957.

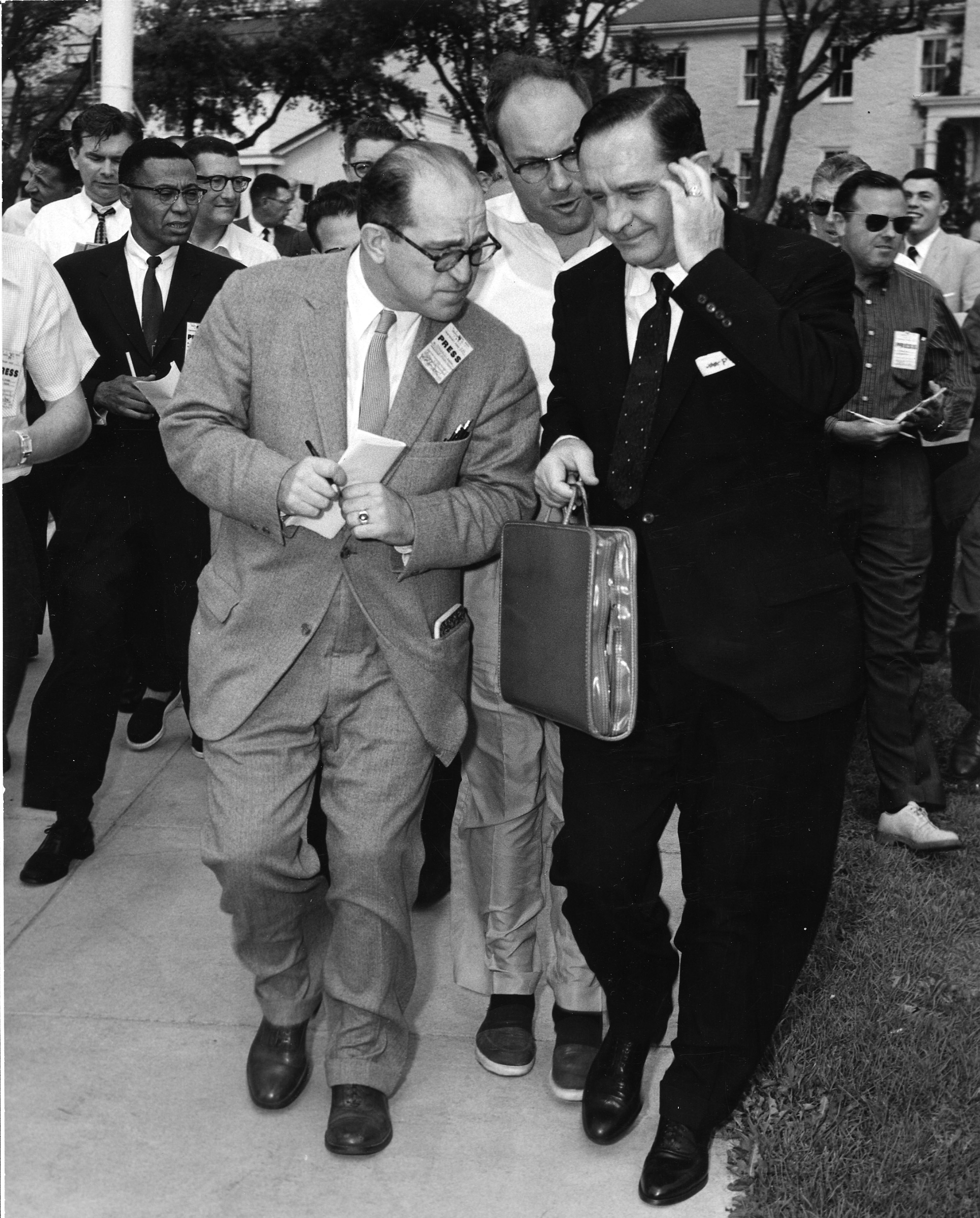
Faubus speaking to reporters after his meeting with Eisenhower at the Newport Naval Base, September 14, 1957.

Faubus was elected governor to six two-year terms and hence served for twelve years. He maintained a defiant, populist image, while he shifted toward a less confrontational stance with the federal government, particularly during the administrations of Presidents John F. Kennedy and Lyndon B. Johnson, with each of whom he remained cordial, and both of whom carried Arkansas. In the 1956 general election, Faubus, having already beaten Jim Johnson, overwhelmed GOP candidate Roy Mitchell, later the GOP state chairman from Hot Springs, 321,797 (80.7%) to 77,215 (19.4%). In 1958, he defeated Republican George W. Johnson of Greenwood in Sebastian County by drawing 82.5% of the votes.

In 1962, Faubus broke with the White Citizens' Councils and other groups, who preferred, but did not officially endorse, U.S. Representative Dale Alford in that year's gubernatorial primary. Faubus cast himself as a moderate, completely ignored the race issue during the 1962 election campaign, and barely secured a majority over Alford, McMath, and three other candidates. He then handily defeated the Republican Willis Ricketts, a then 37-year-old pharmacist from Fayetteville in the general election.

While Faubus was still shunned by black leaders, he nevertheless won a large percent of the black vote. In 1964, when he defeated the Republican Winthrop Rockefeller by a 57–43 percent margin, Faubus won 81 percent of the black vote. He even collected a share of the base Republican vote from the conservative party members who had sided with former Republican state chairman William L. Spicer of Fort Smith, an intraparty rival of Rockefeller.

== 1960 presidential election ==
During the 1960 presidential election, at a secret meeting held in a rural lodge near Dayton, Ohio, the National States' Rights Party (NSRP) nominated Orval Faubus for President and retired U.S. Navy rear admiral John G. Crommelin of Alabama for Vice President. Faubus, however, did not campaign on this ticket actively, and won only 0.07% of the vote (best in his native Arkansas: 6.76%), losing to the John F. Kennedy and Lyndon B. Johnson ticket.

In 1961, Faubus denounced the NSRP for having described the Eichmann trial as a "giant propaganda hoax." Faubus said he had first-hand experience with German atrocities and that his own unit, the 35th Infantry Division, had viewed some of the evidence of Eichmann's crimes. He dismissed defenders of Adolf Eichmann as either "misguided fools or deliberate liars."

== Later life ==
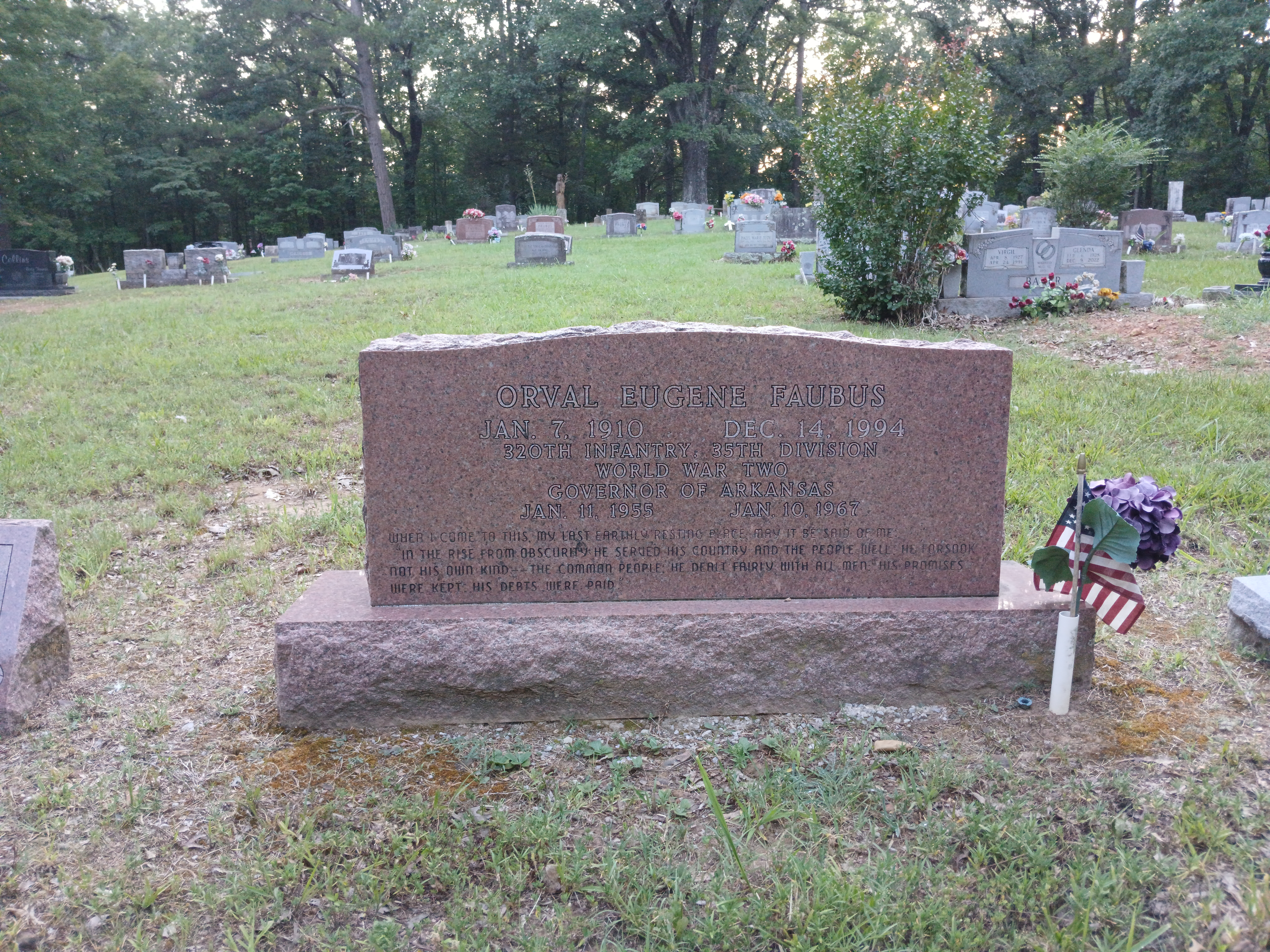
Grave of Orval Faubus in the Combs Cemetery

Faubus chose not to run for re-election to a seventh term in what would likely have been a difficult race in 1966. Former gubernatorial candidate James D. Johnson, by then an elected Arkansas Supreme Court Justice, narrowly won the Democratic nomination over another justice, the moderate Frank Holt. Johnson was then defeated in the general election by Winthrop Rockefeller, who became the state's first GOP governor since Reconstruction. Years later, Johnson himself became a Republican and supported Governor Frank D. White, later a benefactor of Faubus.

In the 1968 United States presidential election, Faubus was among five people considered for the vice-presidential slot of third-party presidential candidate George Wallace. However, in light of the public perception of both as segregationists, Wallace selected retired General Curtis LeMay. During the 1969 season, Faubus was hired by new owner Jess Odom to be general manager of his Li'l Abner theme park in the Ozark Mountains, Dogpatch USA. According to newspaper articles, Faubus was said to have commented that managing the park was similar to running state government because some of the same tricks applied to both.

External video
- Filmed interview with Orval Faubus conducted in 1979 for America, They Loved You Madly, a precursor to Eyes on the Prize. Discussion centers on the integration crisis at Little Rock's Central High School.

Faubus sought the governorship again in 1970, 1974, and 1986 but was defeated in the Democratic primaries by Dale Bumpers, David Pryor, and Bill Clinton, respectively, each of whom defeated Republican opponents. In the 1970 race, two other Democratic candidates in the running, Joe Purcell and Hayes McClerkin, failed to make the runoff, and Bumpers barely edged Purcell for the chance to face Faubus directly. In his last race, 1986, he polled 174,402 votes (33.5 percent) to Clinton's 315,397 (60.6 percent).

In 1984, Faubus was one of the few white politicians to support civil rights activist Jesse Jackson for President of the United States. He supported Jackson again in the 1988 Democratic primaries. Faubus, a life-long Southern Baptist, died of prostate cancer on December 14, 1994, and is interred at the Combs Cemetery in Combs, Arkansas.

== Electoral history ==
1954 Democratic Primary for Governor Francis Cherry (inc.) 47% Orval Faubus 34% Guy H. "Mutt" Jones 13% Gus McMillan 6%

1954 Democratic Primary Runoff for Governor Orval Faubus 51% Francis Cherry 49%

1954 General Election for Governor Orval Faubus (D) 62% Pratt Remmel (R) 38%

1956 Democratic Primary for Governor Orval Faubus (inc.) 58% James D. Johnson 26% Jim Snoddy 14% Stewart K. Prosser 1% Ben Pippin 1%

1956 General Election for Governor Orval Faubus (D) 81% Roy Mitchell (R) 19%

1958 Democratic Primary for Governor Orval Faubus (inc.) 69% Chris Finkbeiner 16% Lee Ward 15%

1958 General Election for Governor Orval Faubus (D) 82% George W. Johnson (R) 18%

1960 Democratic Primary for Governor Orval Faubus (inc.) 59% Joe Hardin 16% Bruce Bennett 14% H.E. Williams 8% Hal Millsap 2%

1960 General Election for Governor Orval Faubus (D) 69% Henry Britt (R) 31%

1962 Democratic Primary for Governor Orval Faubus (inc.) 52% Sid McMath 21% Dale Alford 19% Vernon H. Whitten 5% Kenneth Coffelt 2% David A. Cox 1%

1962 General Election for Governor Orval Faubus (D) 73% Willis "Bubs" Ricketts (R) 27%

1964 Democratic Primary for Governor Orval Faubus (inc.) 66% Odell Dorsey 19% Joe Hubbard 10% R.D. Burrow 4%

1964 General Election for Governor Orval Faubus (D) 57% Winthrop Rockefeller (R) 43%

1970 Democratic Primary for Governor Orval Faubus 36% Dale Bumpers 20% Joe Purcell 19% Hayes C. McClerkin 10% Bill Wells 8% Bob Compton 4% J. M. Malone 2% W.S. Cheek 1%

1970 Democratic Primary Runoff for Governor Dale Bumpers 58% Orval Faubus 42%

1974 Democratic Primary for Governor David Pryor 51% Orval Faubus 33% Bob C. Riley 16%

1986 Democratic Primary for Governor Bill Clinton (inc.) 61% Orval Faubus 34% W. Dean Goldsby 5%

== See also ==
- "Little Rock"

Political offices
Preceded by Francis Cherry	Governor of Arkansas; January 11, 1955 – January 10, 1967	Succeeded by Winthrop Rockefeller
Party political offices
Preceded by Francis Cherry	Democratic nominee for Governor of Arkansas; 1954, 1956, 1958, 1960, 1962, 1964	Succeeded by James D. Johnson
Preceded by New political party	National States' Rights Party presidential nominee 1960	Succeeded by John Kasper
