= Kenova =

Kenova may refer to:

- Kenova, Arkansas, United States; see List of places in Arkansas: K
- Kenova, West Virginia, United States, a city
- North Kenova, Ohio, United States
- Operation Kenova, an investigation into the Royal Ulster Constabulary, Northern Ireland, concerning Stakeknife's killings
