= Lamar Township =

Lamar Township may refer to the following townships in the United States:

- Lamar Township, Madison County, Arkansas
- Lamar Township, Barton County, Missouri
- Lamar Township, Clinton County, Pennsylvania
