= California Township =

California Township may refer to the following places in the United States:

- California Township, Madison County, Arkansas
- California Township, Starke County, Indiana
- California Township, Michigan
