= C. G. Reagan =

American politician

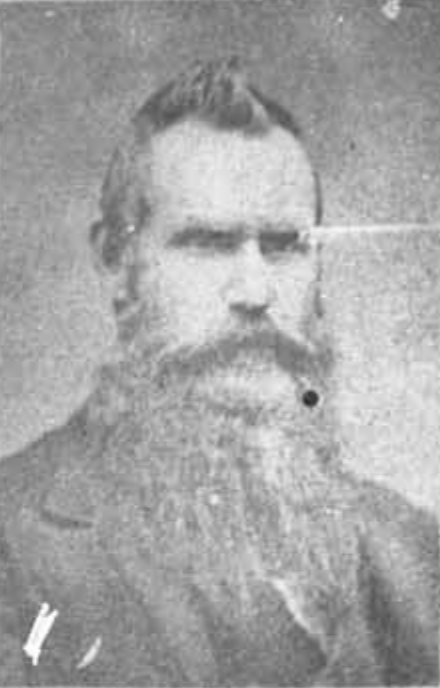
C. G. Reagan c. 1877

C. G. Reagan was an officer during the American Civil War, a state legislator, and prosecuting attorney in Arkansas.

He was a Captain of the Confederate States Army Company 'K' during the American Civil War.

He was a prosecuting attorney for the Eighth Circuit beginning in 1865.

He served in the Arkansas Senate in the 20th and 21st sessions from November 10, 1874, until March 8, 1877, representing the 24th district, for Benton and Madison counties.

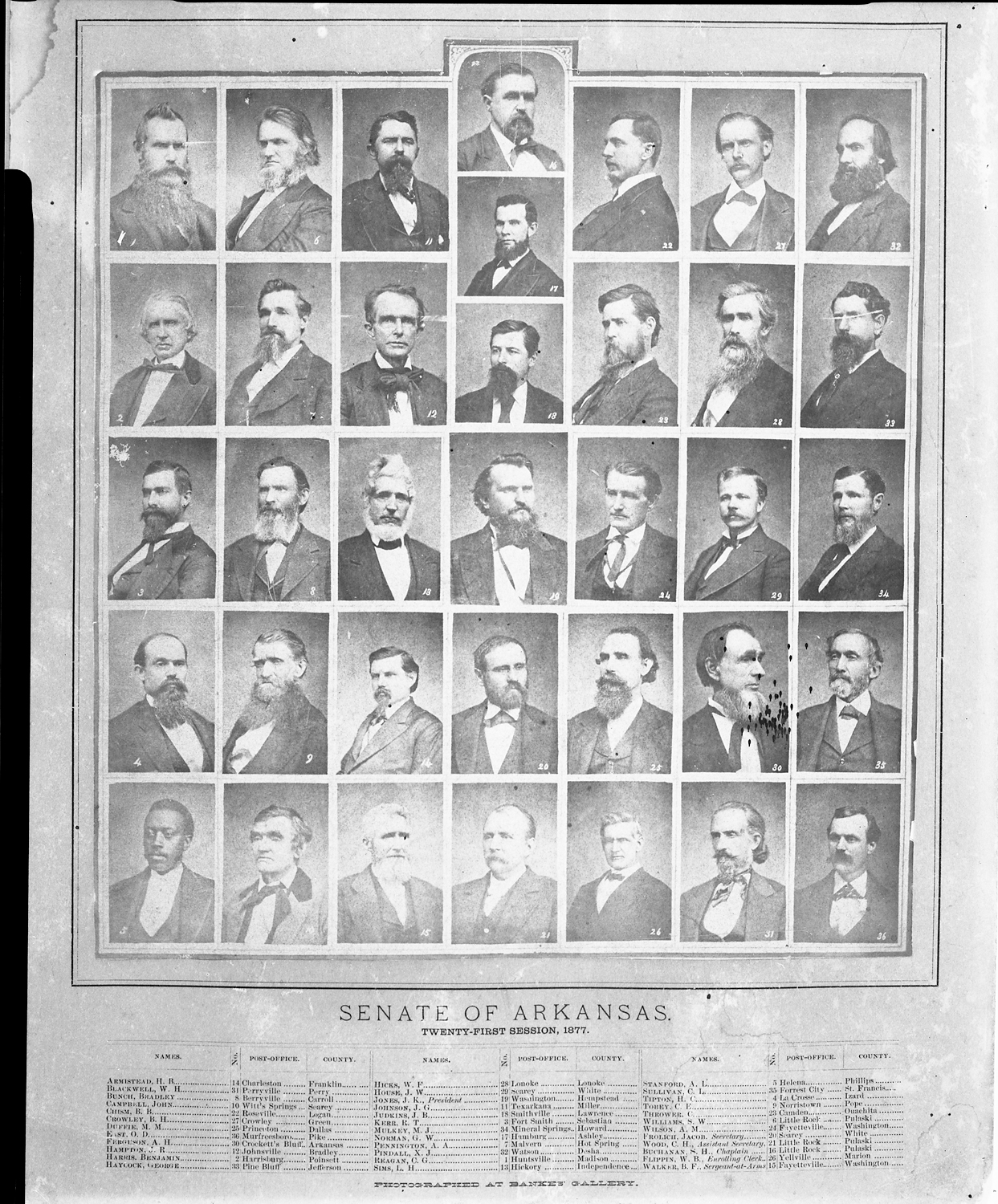
1877 Arkansas Senate composite of photographs

In the 1877 composite photo of Arkansas senators, his post office is listed as in Huntsville, Arkansas in Madison County, Arkansas.
