= Kentucky Township =

- Kentucky Township, Jefferson County, Kansas
- Kentucky Township, Madison County, Arkansas
- Kentucky Township, Newton County, Arkansas
- Kentucky Township, Saline County, Arkansas
- Kentucky Township, White County, Arkansas
