= Arkansas Highway 295 =

State highway in Arkansas, United States

Highway 295

Route information
- Maintained by ArDOT
- Existed: April 24, 1963–present

Section 1
- Length: 5.50 mi (8.85 km)
- South end: CR 4035 at Brannon
- North end: AR 16 at Crosses

Section 2
- Length: 3.07 mi (4.94 km)
- South end: AR 16 at Combs
- North end: CR 5445

Section 3
- Length: 4.71 mi (7.58 km)
- South end: CR 5395 at Japton
- North end: AR 74 at Drake's Creek

Section 4
- Length: 10.88 mi (17.51 km)
- South end: AR 74 at Wesley
- North end: US 412

Location
- Country: United States
- State: Arkansas

Highway system
- Arkansas Highway System; Interstate; US; State; Business; Spurs; Suffixed; Scenic; Heritage
← AR 294	→ AR 296

Highway 295 (AR 295, Ark. 295, and Hwy. 295) is a designation for four north–south state highways in Madison County, Arkansas. One segment of 5.50 miles (8.85 km) runs from Ozark National Forest at Brannon north to Highway 16 at Crosses. A second segment of 3.07 miles (4.94 km) runs northeast from Combs until it continues as Madison County Road 4554 (CR 4554). The third segment runs 4.71 miles (7.58 km) north as a continuation of CR 5395 at Japton through Georgetown to Highway 74 at Drake's Creek. A fourth segment of 10.88 miles (17.51 km) begins at Highway 74 at Wesley and runs north to U.S. Route 412 (US 412).

== Route description ==
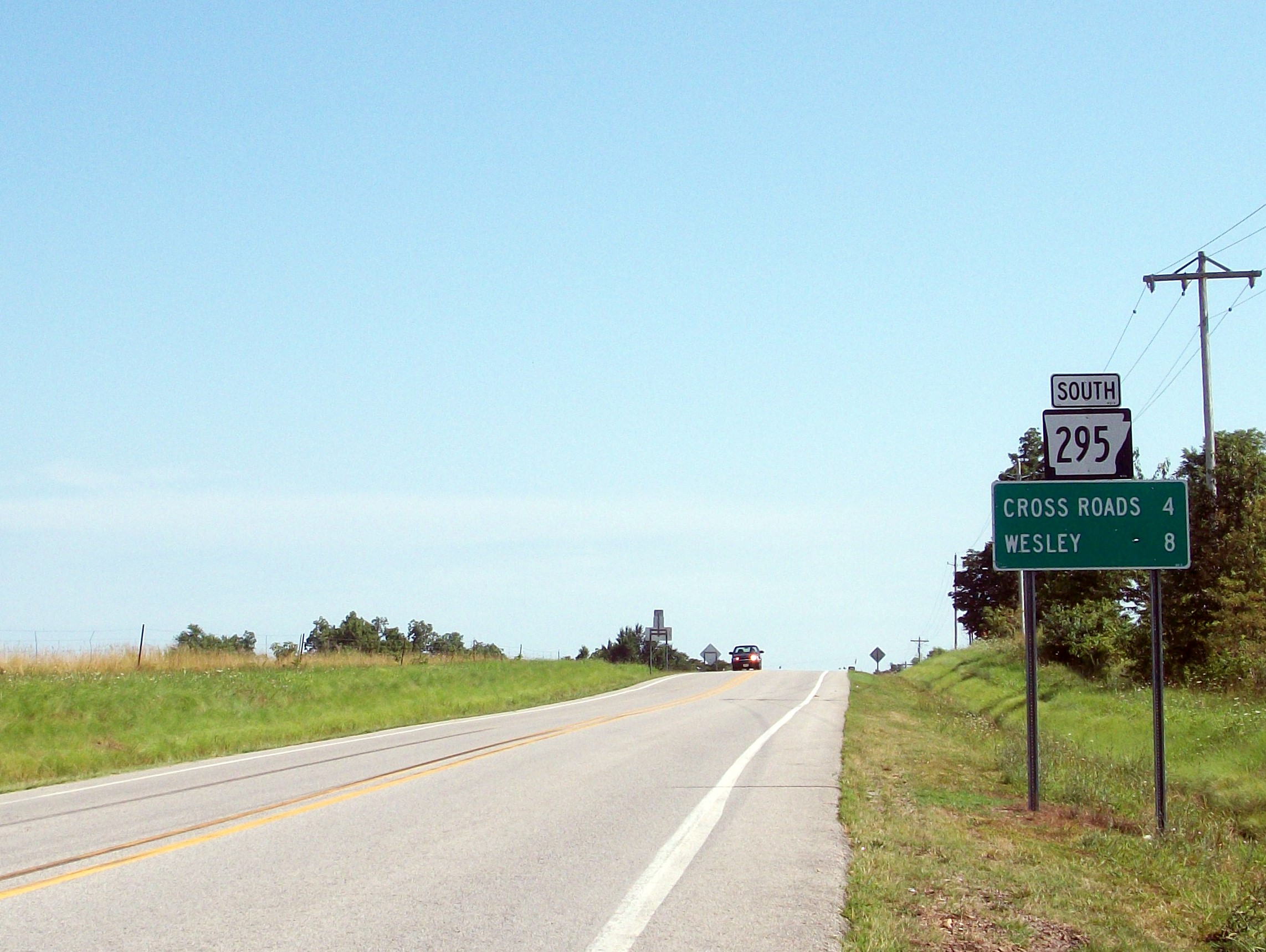
Highway 295 south of the Highway 45 junction

=== Ozark National Forest to Crosses ===
The route runs north from County Road 4035 at Brannon in the Ozark National Forest to Highway 16 at Crosses, where it terminates. The route does not intersect any other state highways.

=== Combs to CR 5445 ===
Highway 295 begins at Highway 16 at Combs and runs northeast until state maintenance ends and the route continues north as County Road 5445. The route parallels Greasy Creek during its entire length and does not intersect any other state highways.

=== Japton to Drake's Creek ===
Highway 295 begins as a continuation of County Road 5395 at Japton and runs northwest. The route passes through Georgetown before a junction with Highway 74 at Drake's Creek, where it terminates. The route does not intersect any other state highways.

=== Wesley to US 412 ===
Highway 295 begins at Highway 74 at Wesley and runs north to intersect Highway 45 near Hindsville. The highway continues north to terminate at US 412.

== History ==
Highway 295 was added to the state highway system as part of a large transfer of county roads to the state system that took place on April 24, 1963. Initially only the portion from Highway 74 to Highway 68 (which later became US 412) was transferred to state maintenance. The sections of Highway 295 running northeast from Combs and southeast from Highway 74 were added to the state highway system on November 23, 1966. The Brannon to Crosses segment was commissioned on June 28, 1973.

== Major intersections ==
The entire route is in Madison County.

Location	mi	km	Destinations	Notes
Brannon	0.00	0.00	CR 4035	Southern terminus
Crosses	5.50	8.85	AR 16 – Fayetteville, Brashears	Northern terminus
Gap in route
Combs	0.00	0.00	AR 16 – Brashears, Fayetteville	Southern terminus
	3.07	4.94	CR 5445 north	Continuation north
Gap in route
Japton	0.00	0.00	CR 5395 south	Continuation south
Drake's Creek	3.07	4.94	AR 74 – Fayetteville, Huntsville	Northern terminus
Gap in route
Wesley	0.00	0.00	AR 74 – Huntsville, Fayetteville	Southern terminus
	8.22	13.23	AR 45 – Mayfield, Hindsville	
	10.88	17.51	US 412 – Huntsville, Springdale	Northern terminus
1.000 mi = 1.609 km; 1.000 km = 0.621 mi

== Former Hindsville spur ==
Highway 295S
- Location: Hindsville
- Length: 1.7 mi (2.7 km)
- Existed: August 25, 1965–March 19, 2009

Highway 295 Spur (AR 295S, Ark. 295S or Hwy. 295S) was a short east–west spur route in Madison County. It ran east from Highway 295 to US 412 in Hindsville. The route was deleted on March 18, 2009, following the rerouting of U.S. Route 412 around Hindsville. Running a total distance of approximately 2.2 miles (3.5 km), the spur followed part of the 1920s–1940's alignment of AR 68 (now U.S. Route 412). The route was extended to the new alignment of US 412 upon its completion.
