= Farrell Faubus =

American politician (1939–1976)

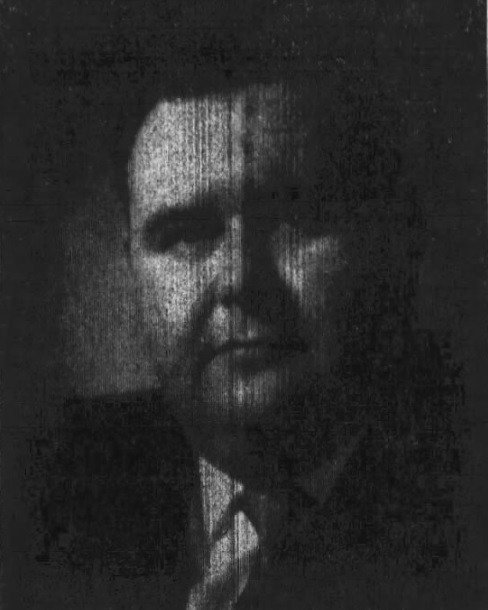
- Portrait of Faubus, c. 1968

Member of the Arkansas House of Representatives from Madison County
- In office July 14, 1961 – January 14, 1963
- Preceded by: A. C. Mowery Jr.
- Succeeded by: Ralph Buck

Personal details
- Born: Farrell Eugene Faubus; April 5, 1939; Fayetteville, Arkansas, U.S.
- Died: June 16, 1976 (aged 37); Seattle, Washington, U.S.
- Political party: Democratic
- Spouses: Martha Jo Culwell (m. 1960, divorced); Dottie Fox (m. 1975; sep. 1976)
- Children: 2
- Parents: Orval Faubus; Alta Haskins Faubus
- Education: University of Arkansas (LLB)
- Occupation: Lawyer; politician; teacher; newspaper publisher

Farrell Eugene Faubus (April 5, 1939 – June 16, 1976) was an American lawyer, newspaper publisher, and politician. The only child of longtime governor of Arkansas Orval Faubus, he was elected to the Arkansas House of Representatives on June 27, 1961, to complete the unexpired term of A. C. Mowery. After struggling with drug addiction for many years, he died of an overdose in 1976, while visiting his aunt in Seattle, Washington.

Arkansas House of Representatives
Preceded by A. C. Mowery Jr.	Member of the Arkansas House of Representatives from Madison County; 1961–1963	Succeeded by Ralph Buck
