= War Eagle Township, Madison County, Arkansas =

War Eagle Township
- Township
- Location in Arkansas
- Country: United States
- State: Arkansas
- County: Madison

Area
  - Total: 60.18 sq mi (155.9 km^{2})
  - Land: 59.76 sq mi (154.8 km^{2})
  - Water: 0.42 sq mi (1.1 km^{2})

Population (2010)
  - Total: 4,037
  - Density: 67.6/sq mi (26.1/km^{2})

War Eagle Township is one of 21 inactive townships in Madison County, Arkansas, USA. As of the 2010 census, its population was 4,037.

War Eagle Township was established before 1850, but the exact date is unknown because early county records were lost.

== Cities, towns and villages ==
- Huntsville
