= Bowen Township, Madison County, Arkansas =

Coordinates: 35.975305°N 93.722794°W

Bowen Township
- Township
- Location in Arkansas
- Country: United States
- State: Arkansas
- County: Madison

Area
  - Total: 32.12 sq mi (83.2 km^{2})
  - Land: 32.01 sq mi (82.9 km^{2})
  - Water: 0.11 sq mi (0.28 km^{2})

Population (2010)
  - Total: 486
  - Density: 15.2/sq mi (5.9/km^{2})

Bowen Township is one of 21 inactive townships in Madison County, Arkansas, USA. As of the 2010 census, its population was 486.

Bowen Township was established before 1850, but the exact date is unknown because early county records were destroyed. The township was named after a local judge.
