= Delaney, Arkansas =

Coordinates: 35.8523°N 93.9002°W

Delaney is an unincorporated community in Madison County, in the U.S. state of Arkansas.

== History ==
In the 1880s, Delaney developed as lumber trading center. A post office called Delaney was established in 1878, and remained in operation until 1966.
