= Georgetown, Madison County, Arkansas =

Georgetown, Arkansas
- Unincorporated community
- Location within Arkansas Location within the United States
- Coordinates: 35°59′44″N 93°49′53″W
- Country: United States
- State: Arkansas
- County: Madison
- Elevation: 1,378 ft (420 m)
- Time zone: UTC-6 (Central (CST))
  - Summer (DST): UTC-5 (CDT)
- GNIS feature ID: 71747

Georgetown is an unincorporated community in Madison County, Arkansas, United States.
