= Bohannan Township, Madison County, Arkansas =

Coordinates: 36.085717°N 93.821228°W

Bohannan Township
- Township
- Location in Arkansas
- Country: United States
- State: Arkansas
- County: Madison

Area
  - Total: 17.2 sq mi (45 km^{2})
  - Land: 17.14 sq mi (44.4 km^{2})
  - Water: 0.06 sq mi (0.16 km^{2})

Population (2010)
  - Total: 631
  - Density: 36.8/sq mi (14.2/km^{2})

Bohannan Township is one of 21 inactive townships in Madison County, Arkansas, United States. As of the 2010 census, its population was 631.
