= Venus Township, Madison County, Arkansas =

Coordinates: 35.939655°N 93.605466°W

Venus Township
- Township
- Location in Arkansas
- Country: United States
- State: Arkansas
- County: Madison

Area
  - Total: 36.78 sq mi (95.3 km^{2})
  - Land: 36.72 sq mi (95.1 km^{2})
  - Water: 0.06 sq mi (0.16 km^{2})

Population (2010)
  - Total: 244
  - Density: 6.6/sq mi (2.5/km^{2})

Venus Township is one of 21 inactive townships in Madison County, Arkansas, USA. As of the 2010 census, its population was 244.
