= White River Township, Madison County, Arkansas =

Coordinates: 35.948524°N 93.892882°W

White River Township
- Township
- Location in Arkansas
- Country: United States
- State: Arkansas
- County: Madison

Area
  - Total: 29.32 sq mi (75.9 km^{2})
  - Land: 29.25 sq mi (75.8 km^{2})
  - Water: 0.07 sq mi (0.18 km^{2})

Population (2010)
  - Total: 248
  - Density: 8.5/sq mi (3.3/km^{2})

White River Township is one of 21 inactive townships in Madison County, Arkansas, USA. As of the 2010 census, its population was 248.
