= Richland Township, Madison County, Arkansas =

Coordinates: 36.022251°N 93.835944°W

Richland Township
- Township
- Location in Arkansas
- Country: United States
- State: Arkansas
- County: Madison

Area
  - Total: 26.37 sq mi (68.3 km^{2})
  - Land: 26.3 sq mi (68 km^{2})
  - Water: 0.07 sq mi (0.18 km^{2})

Population (2010)
  - Total: 567
  - Density: 21.6/sq mi (8.3/km^{2})

Richland Township is one of 21 inactive townships in Madison County, Arkansas, USA. As of the 2010 census, its population was 567.

Richland Township was established before 1850, but the exact date is unknown because early county records were lost.
