= Witter, Arkansas =

- Unincorporated community
- Location within Arkansas Location within the United States
- Coordinates: 35°56′15″N 93°41′01″W
- Country: United States
- State: Arkansas
- County: Madison
- Elevation: 1,431 ft (436 m)
- Time zone: UTC-6 (Central (CST))
  - Summer (DST): UTC-5 (CDT)
- ZIP code: 72776
- Area code: 479
- GNIS feature ID: 78794

Witter is an unincorporated community in Madison County, Arkansas, United States. Witter is located on Arkansas Highway 23, 11 miles (18 km) south-southeast of Huntsville. Witter has a post office with ZIP code 72776. It is approximately 40 miles (64 km) from Fayetteville, Arkansas's second-largest city.
