= Purdy Township, Madison County, Arkansas =

Coordinates: 36.088293°N 93.592540°W

Purdy Township
- Township
- Location in Arkansas
- Country: United States
- State: Arkansas
- County: Madison

Area
  - Total: 14.03 sq mi (36.3 km^{2})
  - Land: 13.99 sq mi (36.2 km^{2})
  - Water: 0.04 sq mi (0.10 km^{2})

Population (2010)
  - Total: 314
  - Density: 22.4/sq mi (8.6/km^{2})

Purdy Township is one of 21 inactive townships in Madison County, Arkansas, USA. As of the 2010 census, its population was 314.
