= Marble Township, Madison County, Arkansas =

Coordinates: 36.131296°N 93.598757°W

Marble Township
- Township
- Location in Arkansas
- Country: United States
- State: Arkansas
- County: Madison

Area
  - Total: 16.49 sq mi (42.7 km^{2})
  - Land: 16.32 sq mi (42.3 km^{2})
  - Water: 0.17 sq mi (0.44 km^{2})

Population (2010)
  - Total: 318
  - Density: 19.5/sq mi (7.5/km^{2})

Marble Township is one of 21 inactive townships in Madison County, Arkansas, USA. As of the 2010 census, its population was 318.

Marble Township was established between the years 1850 and 1860, but the exact date is unknown since early county records were lost.
