= Mill Creek Township, Madison County, Arkansas =

Mill Creek Township
- Township
- Location in Arkansas Mill Creek Township (the United States)
- Coordinates: 35.845829°N 93.826426°W
- Country: United States
- State: Arkansas
- County: Madison

Area
  - Total: 64.71 sq mi (167.6 km^{2})
  - Land: 64.59 sq mi (167.3 km^{2})
  - Water: 0.12 sq mi (0.31 km^{2})

Population (2010)
  - Total: 610
  - Density: 9.4/sq mi (3.6/km^{2})

Mill Creek Township is one of 21 inactive townships in Madison County, Arkansas, USA. As of the 2010 census, its population was 610.
