= Little Rock (poem) =

"Little Rock" is a bilingual poem published by Cuban writer Nicolás Guillén in 1958. The text is a direct denunciation of the race-based segregation present within the United States and written after the Little Rock Crisis emerged during the Civil Rights Movement. As a satirical claim, the poem written in both English and Spanish serves as an appeal to imagine how a changing world would be without race differences. As part of the anthology La paloma del vuelo popular (The dove of popular flight), the composition is fully representative of the "black poetry" he used to write, just as the use of names and real situations at the same time gives a qualitative value where applied.

As seen in the verses, the references to Little Rock city and the Arkansas governor Faubus turn into metaphors for qualifying segregation actions:

In that Faubus world

under that hard Faubus sky of gangrene, the black children can

not attend school together with whites

a world of white schools for whites

a world all Rock and all Little

a world all Yanquee and all Faubus

As a piece of literature, the poem was a response to the Little Rock events, in the same way as was "Fables of Faubus" by jazzist Charles Mingus. The coherence of Butler's vindication can be found in later works in which he «continued to rail against the rabid racism of the United States. His ironic El Gran Zoo (The Great Zoo) is caustic in its critic of "Lynch Law" (a law that is satirized in the verse "[...] sons of Lynch their playmates" of "Little Rock").

== See also ==
- Governor Faubus
- Racial segregation in the United States
