= Silver Springs, New York =

- Village
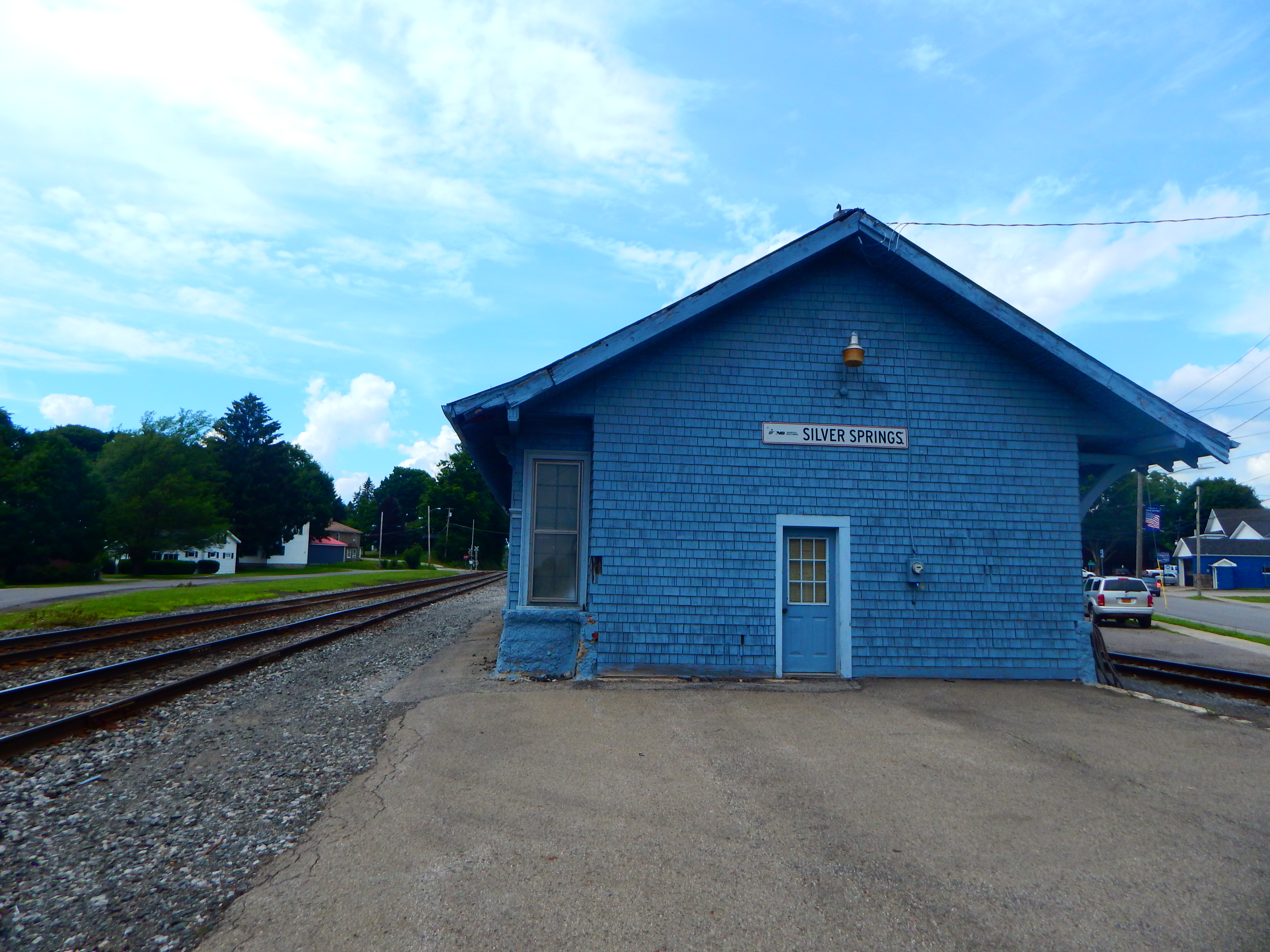
- The former Erie Railroad station in Silver Springs in June 2015.

- Location within the state of New York
- Coordinates: 42°39′32″N 78°5′6″W
- Country: United States
- State: New York
- County: Wyoming
- Incorporated: 1895
- Named after: Local creek

Area
  - Total: 0.98 sq mi (2.54 km^{2})
  - Land: 0.95 sq mi (2.47 km^{2})
  - Water: 0.027 sq mi (0.07 km^{2})
- Elevation: 1,414 ft (431 m)

Population (2020)
  - Total: 689
  - Density: 723.5/sq mi (279.34/km^{2})
- Time zone: UTC-5 (Eastern (EST))
  - Summer (DST): UTC-4 (EDT)
- ZIP code: 14550
- Area code: 585
- FIPS code: 36-67466
- GNIS feature ID: 0965285
- Website: www.wyomingco.net/towns/villageofsilversprings.htm

Silver Springs is a village in Wyoming County, New York, United States. As of the 2020 census, Silver Springs had a population of 689.

The Village of Silver Springs is within the Town of Gainesville, and is located on Route 19A.

Silver Springs is home to the world's largest collection of Beavis and Butt-Head memorabilia.

== History ==
The Village of Silver Springs was incorporated in 1895 and had formerly been East Gainesville.

Silver Springs is located at 42°39′32″N 78°5′6″W (42.658791, -78.084875).

According to the United States Census Bureau, the village has a total area of 1.0 square mile (2.6 km^{2}), of which 0.9 square miles (2.3 km^{2}) is land and 0.04 square miles (0.10 km^{2}) (3.09%) is water.

== Demographics ==
Historical population
Census	Pop.	Note	%±
1900	667		—
1910	974		46.0%
1920	1,155		18.6%
1930	879		−23.9%
1940	766		−12.9%
1950	830		8.4%
1960	726		−12.5%
1970	823		13.4%
1980	801		−2.7%
1990	852		6.4%
2000	844		−0.9%
2010	782		−7.3%
2020	689		−11.9%
U.S. Decennial Census

As of the census of 2000, there were 844 people, 341 households, and 221 families residing in the village. The population density was 892.2 inhabitants per square mile (344.5/km^{2}). There were 370 housing units at an average density of 391.1 per square mile (151.0/km^{2}). The racial makeup of the village was 98.10% White, 0.24% African American, 0.47% Native American, 0.12% Asian, and 1.07% from two or more races. Hispanic or Latino of any race were 0.95% of the population.

There were 341 households, out of which 31.7% had children under the age of 18 living with them, 49.3% were married couples living together, 10.9% had a female householder with no husband present, and 34.9% were non-families. 29.3% of all households were made up of individuals, and 15.0% had someone living alone who was 65 years of age or older. The average household size was 2.46 and the average family size was 3.02.

In the village, the population was spread out, with 23.8% under the age of 18, 7.2% from 18 to 24, 31.0% from 25 to 44, 23.6% from 45 to 64, and 14.3% who were 65 years of age or older. The median age was 38 years. For every 100 females, there were 89.7 males. For every 100 females age 18 and over, there were 84.8 males?

The median income for a household in the village was $34,338, and the median income for a family was $43,750. Males had a median income of $31,842 versus $22,557 for females. The per capita income for the village was $15,993. About 6.1% of families and 8.3% of the population were below the poverty line, including 7.7% of those under age 18 and 7.9% of those age 65 or over.

=== Public school ===
- Letchworth High School
