= Wesley, Arkansas =

- Census-designated place
- Location within Arkansas Location within the United States
- Coordinates: 36°01′45″N 93°54′59″W
- Country: United States
- State: Arkansas
- County: Madison

Area
  - Total: 1.387 sq mi (3.59 km^{2})
  - Land: 1.369 sq mi (3.55 km^{2})
  - Water: 0.018 sq mi (0.047 km^{2})
- Elevation: 1,280 ft (390 m)

Population (2020)
  - Total: 161
- Time zone: UTC-6 (Central (CST))
  - Summer (DST): UTC-5 (CDT)
- ZIP code: 72773
- Area code: 479
- GNIS feature ID: 2805697
- FIPS code: 05-74090

Wesley is an unincorporated community and census-designated place (CDP) in western Madison County, Arkansas, United States. Wesley is located at the junction of Arkansas highways 74 and 295, 13 miles (21 km) by road west-southwest of Huntsville. Wesley has a post office with ZIP code 72773. It was first listed as a CDP in the 2020 census with a population of 161.

== History ==
Wesley was platted in 1872. The first postmaster gave the community his last name.

== Demographics ==
Historical population
Census	Pop.	Note	%±
2020	161		—
U.S. Decennial Census; 2020

=== 2020 census ===
Wesley CDP, Arkansas – Demographic Profile (NH = Non-Hispanic) Note: the US Census treats Hispanic/Latino as an ethnic category. This table excludes Latinos from the racial categories and assigns them to a separate category. Hispanics/Latinos may be of any race.
Race / Ethnicity	Pop 2020	% 2020
White alone (NH)	150	93.17%
Black or African American alone (NH)	2	1.24%
Native American or Alaska Native alone (NH)	0	0.00%
Asian alone (NH)	0	0.00%
Pacific Islander alone (NH)	0	0.00%
Some Other Race alone (NH)	0	0.00%
Mixed Race/Multi-Racial (NH)	4	2.48%
Hispanic or Latino (any race)	5	3.11%
Total	161	100.00%
