= Victor, Arkansas =

- Unincorporated community
- Victor's position in Arkansas Victor, Arkansas (the United States)
- Coordinates: 35°39′2″N 93°00′10″W
- Country: United States
- State: Arkansas
- County: Pope
- Township: Freeman
- Elevation: 886 ft (270 m)
- Time zone: UTC-6 (Central (CST))
  - Summer (DST): UTC-5 (CDT)
- ZIP code: 72837
- Area code: 479
- GNIS feature ID: 78656

Victor (formerly Morning Shade) is an unincorporated community in Freeman Township, Pope County, Arkansas, United States. It is located on Victor Road within the Ozark National Forest.
