= Wharton Township, Madison County, Arkansas =

Coordinates: 36.008463°N 93.619431°W

Whorton Township
- Township
- Location in Arkansas
- Country: United States
- State: Arkansas
- County: Madison

Area
  - Total: 34.31 sq mi (88.9 km^{2})
  - Land: 34.16 sq mi (88.5 km^{2})
  - Water: 0.15 sq mi (0.39 km^{2})

Population (2010)
  - Total: 418
  - Density: 12.2/sq mi (4.7/km^{2})

Whorton Township is one of 21 inactive townships in Madison County, Arkansas, USA. As of the 2010 census, its population was 418.
