= Luber School =

- U.S. National Register of Historic Places
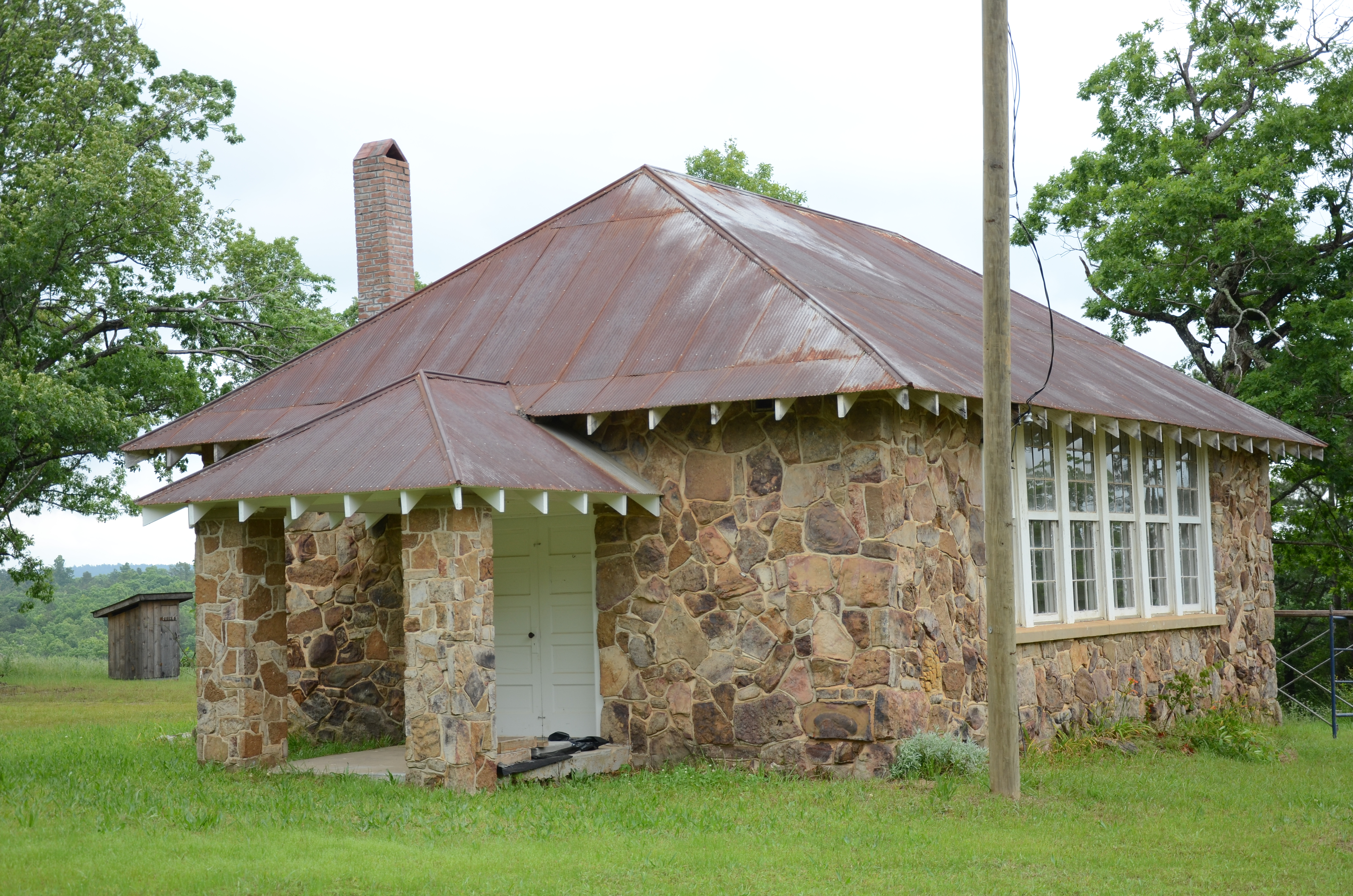

- Location within Arkansas Location within the United States
- Location: Co. Rd. 214, Luber, Arkansas
- Coordinates: 35°46′11″N 92°5′15″W
- Area: less than one acre
- Built: 1930
- Architectural style: Bungalow/craftsman
- MPS: Public Schools in the Ozarks MPS
- NRHP reference No.: 92001124
- Added to NRHP: September 4, 1992

The Luber School is a historic one-room schoolhouse building in rural central-southern Stone County, Arkansas. It is located at the northern corner of Luber Road (County Road 25) and County Road 214 in the community of Luber, south-southeast of Mountain View. The school is a single story rectangular stone structure, with a hip roof that has exposed rafter ends in the Craftsman style. A hip-roofed porch projects to the south, supported by square columns, and shelters the main double-door entrance. The school was built by the small rural community in 1930, just before the full effects of the Great Depression and a drought ruined the area's economy.

Its schoolyard is enclosed on three sides by a low rock wall.

The building was listed on the National Register of Historic Places in 1992.

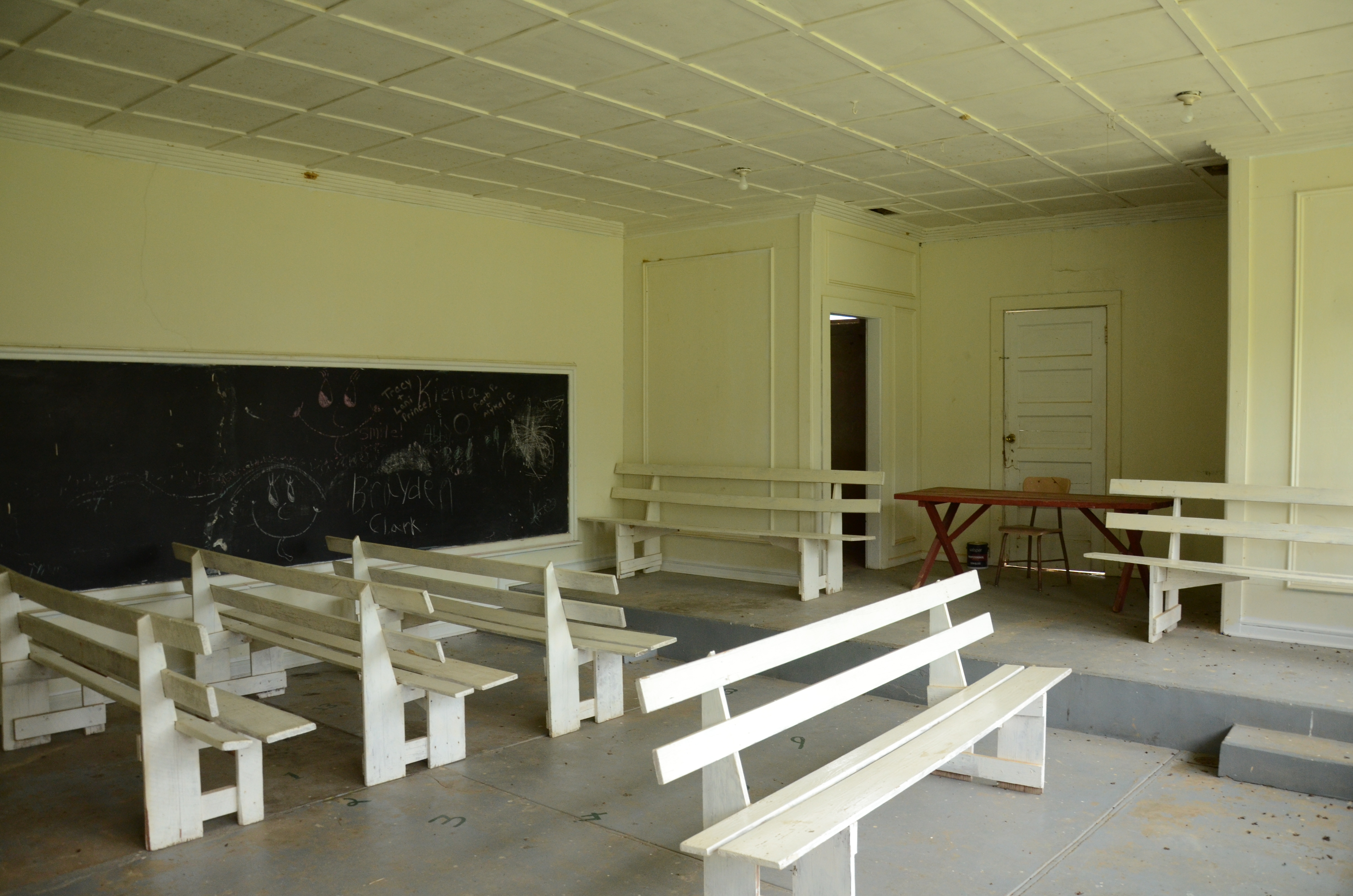
Luber School interior

== See also ==
- National Register of Historic Places listings in Stone County, Arkansas
