= Japton Township, Madison County, Arkansas =

Coordinates: 35.955531°N 93.793701°W

Japton Township
- Township
- Location in Arkansas
- Country: United States
- State: Arkansas
- County: Madison

Area
  - Total: 25.6 sq mi (66 km^{2})
  - Land: 25.53 sq mi (66.1 km^{2})
  - Water: 0.07 sq mi (0.18 km^{2})

Population (2010)
  - Total: 441
  - Density: 17.3/sq mi (6.7/km^{2})

Japton Township is one of 21 inactive townships in Madison County, Arkansas, USA. As of the 2010 census, its population was 441.
