= Alabam Township, Madison County, Arkansas =

Township in Arkansas, United States

Coordinates: 36.191194°N 93.669170°W

Alabam Township
- Township
- Location in Arkansas
- Country: United States
- State: Arkansas
- County: Madison

Area
  - Total: 57.9 sq mi (150 km^{2})
  - Land: 57.57 sq mi (149.1 km^{2})
  - Water: 0.33 sq mi (0.85 km^{2})

Population (2010)
  - Total: 1,261
  - Density: 21.9/sq mi (8.5/km^{2})

Alabam Township is one of 21 inactive townships in Madison County, Arkansas, USA. As of the 2010 census, its population was 1,261.
