= Lakeside, Arkansas =

Coordinates: 34°32′12″N 92°15′56″W

- Unincorporated community
- Interactive map of Lakeside, Arkansas
- Country: United States
- State: Arkansas
- County: Saline County

Lakeside is an unincorporated community in southeastern Saline County, Arkansas, United States. The community is located three miles west of Woodson and twelve miles south of Little Rock on US Route 65. Lakeside is on the east shore of Ferguson Lake.

The community is part of the Little Rock–North Little Rock–Conway Metropolitan Statistical Area.
