= Freeman Township, Pope County, Arkansas =

Freeman Township
- Township
- Location in Arkansas
- Coordinates: 35°39′10″N 93°04′06″W
- Country: United States
- State: Arkansas
- County: Pope
- Established: 1873

Area
  - Total: 119.78 sq mi (310.2 km^{2})
  - Land: 119.78 sq mi (310.2 km^{2})
  - Water: 0.0 sq mi (0 km^{2})
- Elevation: 1,240 ft (380 m)

Population (2010)
  - Total: 102
  - Density: 0.9/sq mi (0.35/km^{2})
- Time zone: UTC-6 (CST)
  - Summer (DST): UTC-5 (CDT)
- GNIS feature ID: 69703

Freeman Township is one of nineteen current townships in Pope County, Arkansas, USA. As of the 2020 census, its unincorporated population was 164.

== Geography ==
According to the United States Census Bureau, Freeman Township covers an area of 119.78 square miles (310.2 km^{2}); all of this land.
