= Luber, Arkansas =

- Unincorporated community
- Location within Arkansas Location within the United States
- Coordinates: 35°45′56″N 92°05′02″W
- Country: United States
- State: Arkansas
- County: Stone
- Elevation: 1,207 ft (368 m)
- Time zone: UTC-6 (Central (CST))
  - Summer (DST): UTC-5 (CDT)
- Area code: 870
- GNIS feature ID: 58097

Luber is an unincorporated community in Stone County, Arkansas, United States. Luber is located on unmarked gravel roads, 7.3 miles (11.7 km) south-southeast of Mountain View. The Luber School, which is listed on the National Register of Historic Places, is located in Luber.
