= Kings River Township, Madison County, Arkansas =

Coordinates: 36.035554°N 93.503218°W

Kings River Township
- Township
- Location in Arkansas
- Country: United States
- State: Arkansas
- County: Madison

Area
  - Total: 63.47 sq mi (164.4 km^{2})
  - Land: 63.23 sq mi (163.8 km^{2})
  - Water: 0.24 sq mi (0.62 km^{2})

Population (2010)
  - Total: 769
  - Density: 12.2/sq mi (4.7/km^{2})

Kings River Township is one of 21 inactive townships in Madison County, Arkansas, USA. As of the 2010 census, its population was 769.

Kings River Township was established before 1850, but the exact date is unknown because early county records were lost. The township takes its name from the Kings River within its borders.
