= California Township, Madison County, Arkansas =

Coordinates: 36.255402°N 93.770360°W

California Township
- Township
- Location in Arkansas
- Country: United States
- State: Arkansas
- County: Madison

Area
  - Total: 85.03 sq mi (220.2 km^{2})
  - Land: 84.85 sq mi (219.8 km^{2})
  - Water: 0.18 sq mi (0.47 km^{2})

Population (2010)
  - Total: 1,303
  - Density: 15.4/sq mi (5.9/km^{2})

California Township is one of 21 inactive townships in Madison County, Arkansas, USA. As of the 2010 census, its population was 1,303.

California Township was established between the years 1850 and 1860, but the exact date is unknown since early county records were lost.
