= Letchworth High School, Gainesville =

Letchworth High School

Location
- 5550 School Rd; Gainesville, New York 14066; United States
- Coordinates: 42°37′46″N 78°6′54″W

Information
- Type: Public
- School district: Letchworth Central School District
- Superintendent: Todd Campbell
- NCES School ID: 361713001516
- Principal: Paul Rogers
- Teaching staff: 29.33 (on an FTE basis)
- Grades: 9-12
- Enrollment: 256 (2021-2022)
- Student to teacher ratio: 8.73
- Campus: Rural: Distant
- Color(s): Red and White
- Mascot: Legends
- Yearbook: Legend
- Website: www.letchworth.k12.ny.us

Letchworth High School is a public high school in Gainesville, New York. It is part of the Letchworth Central School District and serves the towns of Gainesville, Pike, Castile, and Eagle, and the villages of Silver Springs and Bliss.

== Letchworth library ==
The mission of the Letchworth Central Middle and High School Library Media Program is to "ensure that students and staff are effective and discriminating life-long users of information." Effective use of information requires access to information in traditional, up-to-date, and future methods of technologies. It is essential that the school library media program be integrated into the existing curriculum of every classroom, since "no one part of the system can achieve satisfactory results without the cooperation of other parts of the whole."

== Teachers ==
The Student-Teacher Ratio is 12. Average years teaching is 13, Average years teaching in district is 11, First-year teachers 3%. 24% of teachers have a bachelor's degree and 76% have a master's degree with 1% having a doctorate degree.

== Students ==
Student Ethnicity for 2004-2005 was 99% White, non-Hispanic and 1% African American.
