= Lincoln Township, Madison County, Arkansas =

Coordinates: 35.902011°N 93.686265°W

Lincoln Township
- Township
- Location in Arkansas
- Country: United States
- State: Arkansas
- County: Madison

Area
  - Total: 24.98 sq mi (64.7 km^{2})
  - Land: 24.92 sq mi (64.5 km^{2})
  - Water: 0.07 sq mi (0.18 km^{2})

Population (2010)
  - Total: 229
  - Density: 9.2/sq mi (3.6/km^{2})

Lincoln Township is one of 21 inactive townships in Madison County, Arkansas, USA. As of the 2010 census, its population was 229.
