= Lost Corner, Arkansas =

- Unincorporated community
- Lost Corner's position in Arkansas. Lost Corner, Arkansas (the United States)
- Coordinates: 35°34′18″N 92°50′03″W
- Country: United States
- State: Arkansas
- County: Pope
- Elevation: 1,683 ft (513 m)
- Time zone: UTC-6 (Central (CST))
  - Summer (DST): UTC-5 (CDT)
- GNIS feature ID: 57097

Lost Corner is an unincorporated community in Pope County, Arkansas, United States. The community changed its name from Okay to avoid confusion with a community in Howard County with the same name. Lost Corner was selected because of the backwoods location of the community.

Lost Corner consists of a few farms in Pope County northeast of Hector (Pope County) and is near the Van Buren County line. It is located on a ridge between the south fork of the Little Red River to the east and the Illinois Bayou to the west.
