= SS Letchworth =

Letchworth was the name of two steamships of the Watergate Steamship Co Ltd:

- SS Letchworth (1924), bombed and sunk in the Thames Estuary on 1 November 1940
- SS Letchworth (1942), ex Empire Caxton
