= Lamar Township, Madison County, Arkansas =

Coordinates: 36.032938°N 93.909403°W

Lamar Township
- Township
- Location in Arkansas
- Country: United States
- State: Arkansas
- County: Madison
- Established: 1878

Area
  - Total: 28.14 sq mi (72.9 km^{2})
  - Land: 28.01 sq mi (72.5 km^{2})
  - Water: 0.13 sq mi (0.34 km^{2})

Population (2010)
  - Total: 949
  - Density: 33.9/sq mi (13.1/km^{2})

Lamar Township is one of 21 inactive townships in Madison County, Arkansas, USA. As of the 2010 census, its population was 949.
