= Kentucky Township, Madison County, Arkansas =

Coordinates: 35.822760°N 93.677824°W

Kentucky Township
- Township
- Location in Arkansas
- Country: United States
- State: Arkansas
- County: Madison
- Established: 1885

Area
  - Total: 45.55 sq mi (118.0 km^{2})
  - Land: 45.51 sq mi (117.9 km^{2})
  - Water: 0.04 sq mi (0.10 km^{2})

Population (2010)
  - Total: 265
  - Density: 5.8/sq mi (2.2/km^{2})

Kentucky Township is one of 21 inactive townships in Madison County, Arkansas, USA. As of the 2010 census, its population was 265.
