= Valley Township, Madison County, Arkansas =

Coordinates: 35.850483°N 93.918223°W

Valley Township
- Township
- Location in Arkansas
- Country: United States
- State: Arkansas
- County: Madison

Area
  - Total: 37.41 sq mi (96.9 km^{2})
  - Land: 37.24 sq mi (96.5 km^{2})
  - Water: 0.17 sq mi (0.44 km^{2})

Population (2010)
  - Total: 517
  - Density: 13.9/sq mi (5.4/km^{2})

Valley Township is one of 21 inactive townships in Madison County, Arkansas, United States. As of the 2010 census, its population was 517.

Valley Township was established between the years 1850 and 1860, but the exact date is unknown since early county records were lost.
