= Combs, Arkansas =

- Unincorporated community
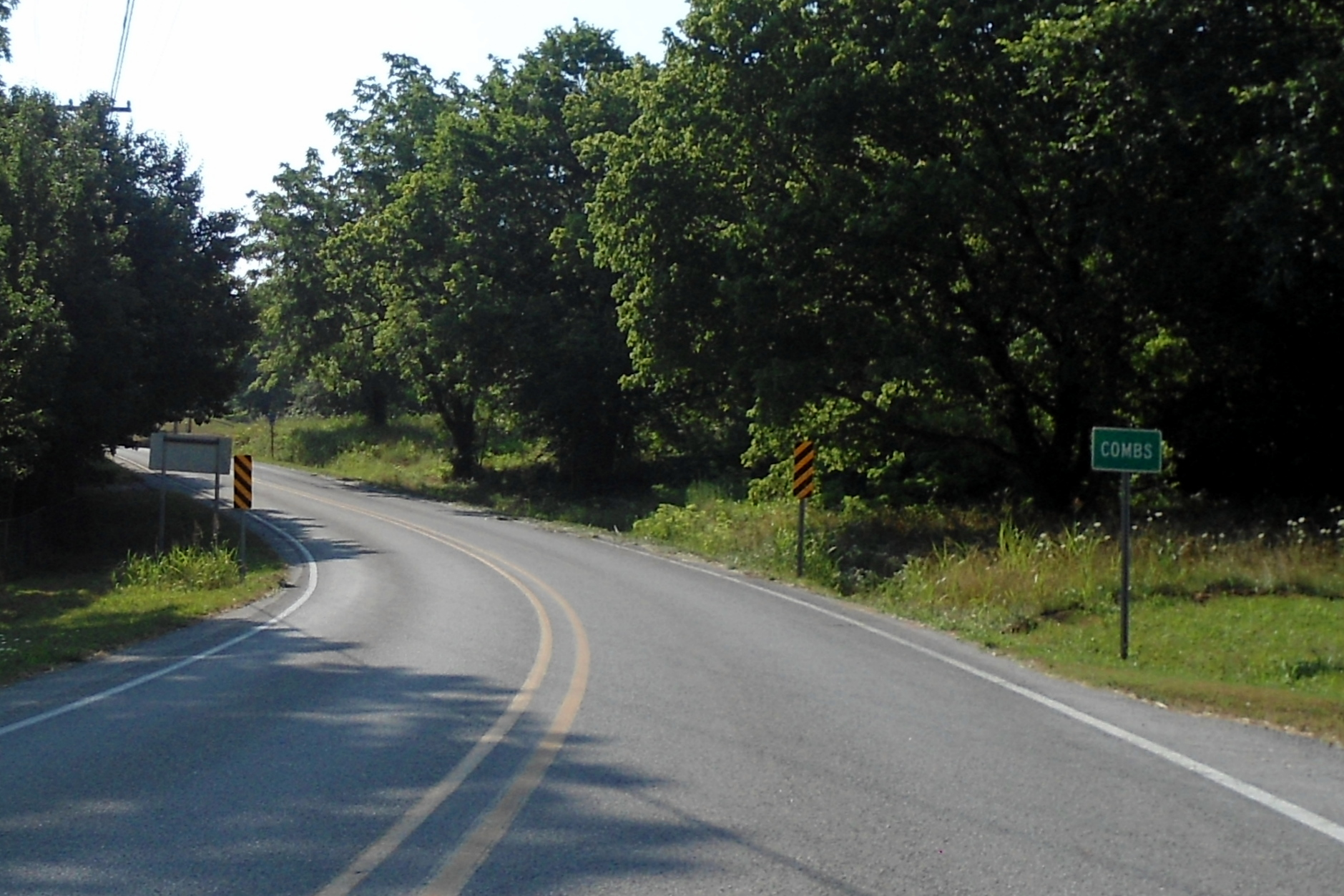
- Entrance to Combs on Highway 16

- Location within Arkansas Location within the United States
- Coordinates: 35°49′32″N 93°50′12″W
- Country: United States
- State: Arkansas
- County: Madison
- Elevation: 1,430 ft (440 m)
- Time zone: UTC-6 (Central (CST))
  - Summer (DST): UTC-5 (CDT)
- GNIS feature ID: 71205

Combs is an unincorporated community in southern Madison County, Arkansas, United States. It is located on Arkansas Highway 16 at the southern terminus of AR 295. The community is within the Ozark-St. Francis National Forest and just south of the upper White River. The community of Brashears is about two miles east on route 16. The population was 431 as of the 2021 census, the overwhelming majority of which was white.

== History ==
A post office was established at Combs in 1888. The community has the name of Captain Hiram Hite Combs (1832–1917), a first settler.
