= Madison County, Arkansas =

County in Arkansas, United States

- County
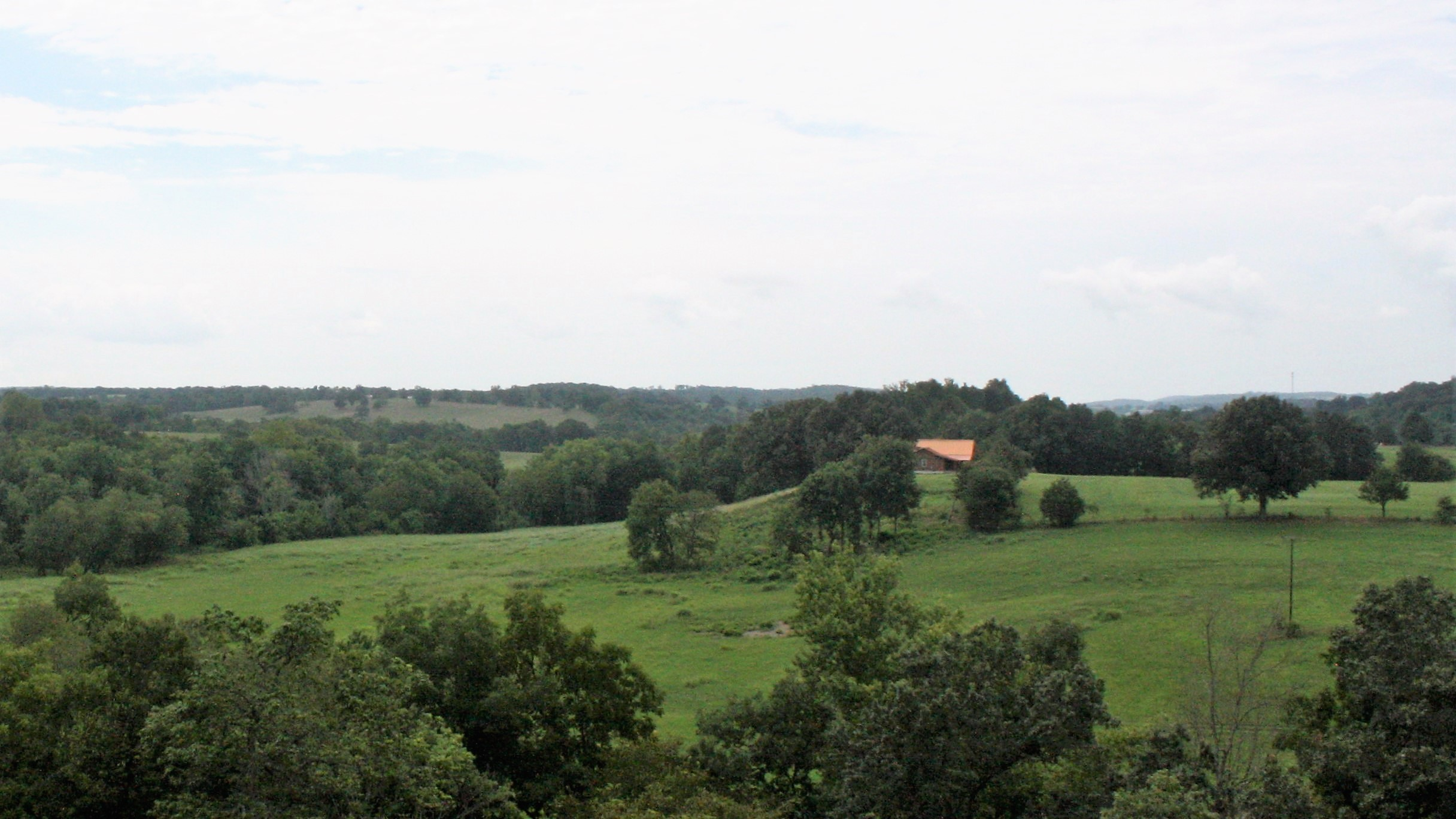
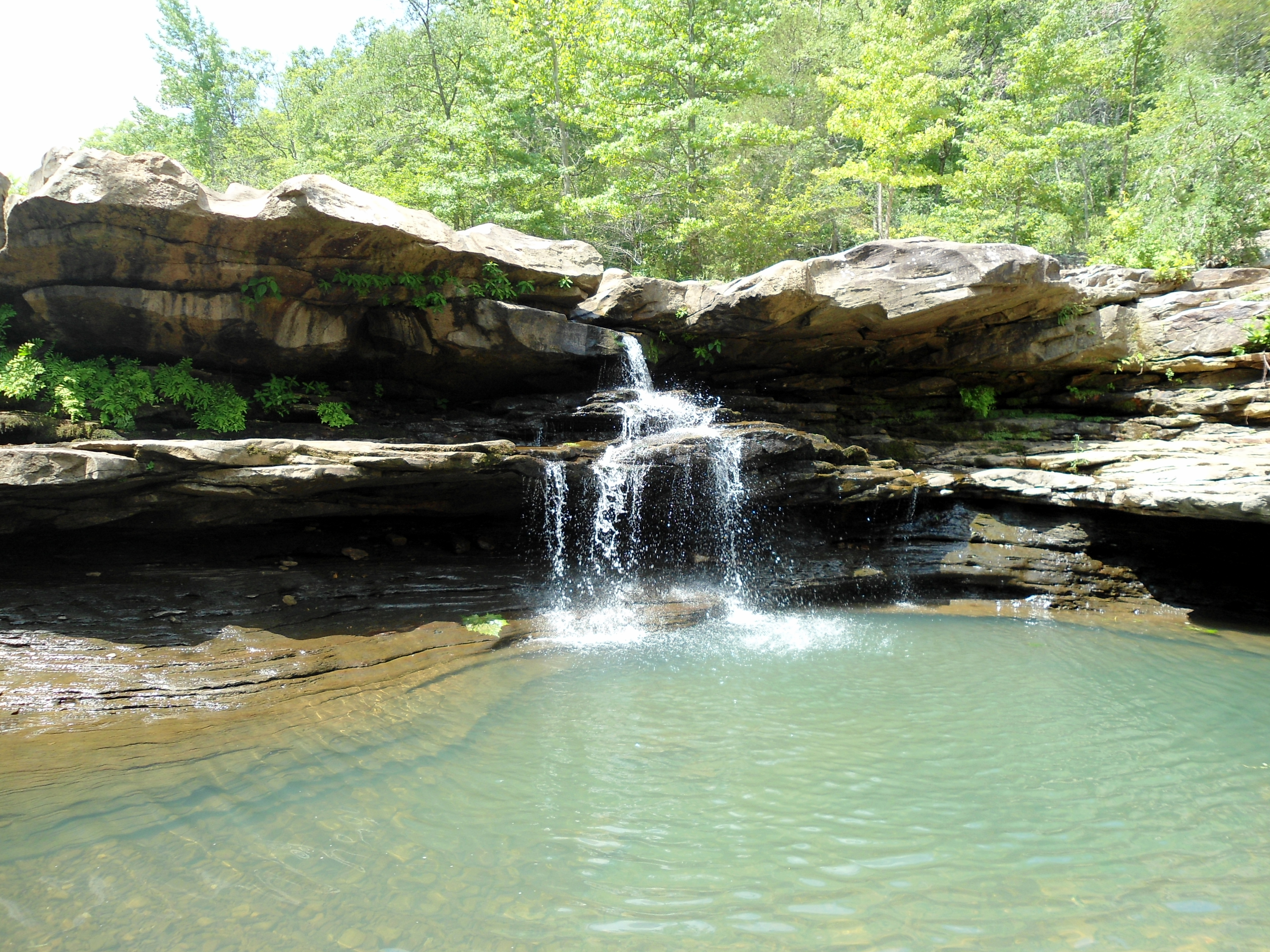
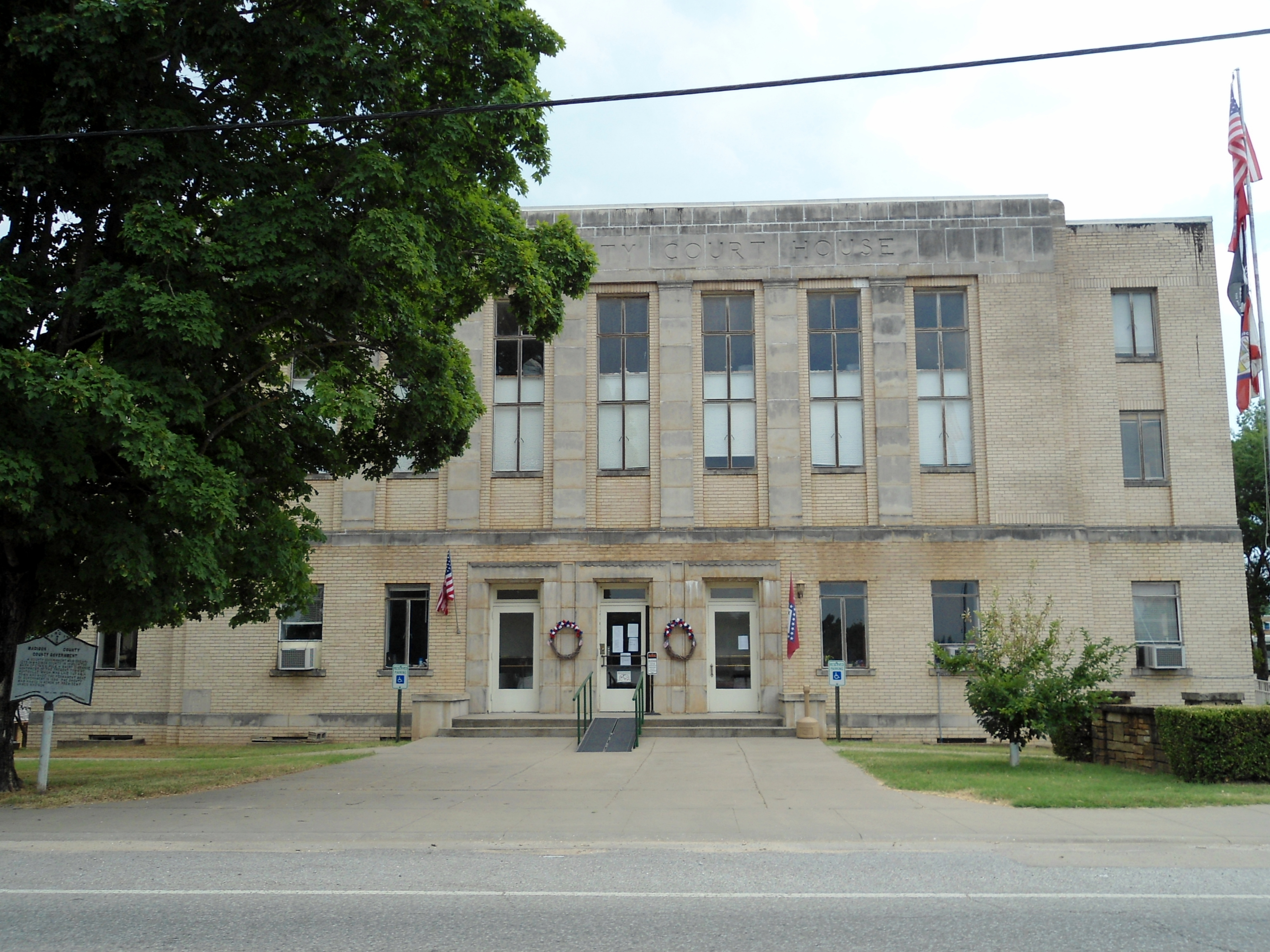
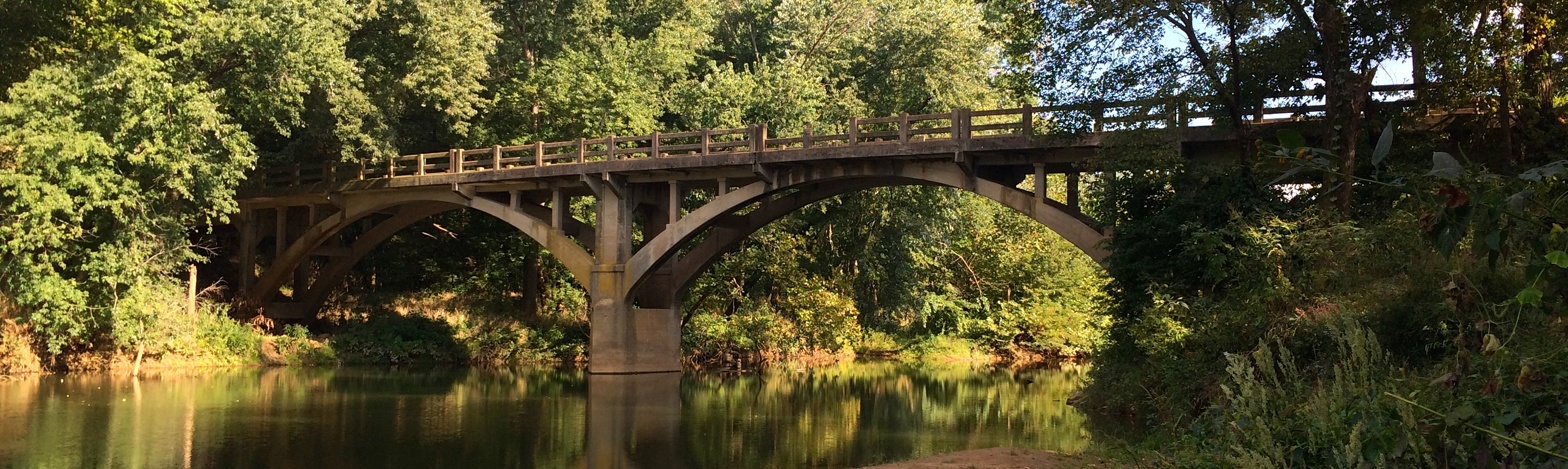
- Clockwise from top: A rural scene in Madison County near Forum, Madison County Courthouse in Huntsville, War Eagle Creek Bridge, Kings River Falls and swimming hole at the Kings River Falls Natural Area

- Flag Seal

- Location within the U.S. state of Arkansas
- Coordinates: 36°01′38″N 93°41′45″W
- Country: United States
- State: Arkansas
- Founded: September 30, 1836
- Named for: Madison County, Alabama
- Seat: Huntsville
- Largest city: Huntsville

Area
  - Total: 837 sq mi (2,170 km^{2})
  - Land: 834 sq mi (2,160 km^{2})
  - Water: 2.8 sq mi (7.3 km^{2}) 0.3%

Population (2020)
  - Total: 16,521
  - Estimate (2025): 18,410 ▲
  - Density: 19.8/sq mi (7.65/km^{2})
- Time zone: UTC−6 (Central)
  - Summer (DST): UTC−5 (CDT)
- Congressional district: 3rd
- Website: madisoncountyar.gov

Madison County is a county located in the U.S. state of Arkansas. As of the 2020 census, the population was 16,521. The county seat is Huntsville. The county was formed on September 30, 1836, and named for Madison County, Alabama, the home of some early settlers. They also named the county seat after Madison County in Alabama's county seat, Huntsville. Madison County is part of the Northwest Arkansas region.

== Geography ==
According to the U.S. Census Bureau, the county has a total area of 837 square miles (2,170 km^{2}), of which 834 square miles (2,160 km^{2}) is land and 2.8 square miles (7.3 km^{2}) (0.3%) is water.

=== Adjacent counties ===
- Carroll County (north)
- Newton County (east)
- Johnson County (southeast)
- Franklin County (south)
- Crawford County (southwest)
- Washington County (west)
- Benton County (northwest)

=== Protected areas ===
- Hobbs State Park – Conservation Area (part)
- Ozark National Forest (part)
- White Rock Wildlife Management Area (part)
- Withrow Springs State Park

== Demographics ==
Historical population
Census	Pop.	Note	%±
1840	2,775		—
1850	4,823		73.8%
1860	7,740		60.5%
1870	8,231		6.3%
1880	11,455		39.2%
1890	17,402		51.9%
1900	19,864		14.1%
1910	16,056		−19.2%
1920	14,918		−7.1%
1930	13,334		−10.6%
1940	14,531		9.0%
1950	11,734		−19.2%
1960	9,068		−22.7%
1970	9,453		4.2%
1980	11,373		20.3%
1990	11,618		2.2%
2000	14,243		22.6%
2010	15,717		10.3%
2020	16,521		5.1%
2025 (est.)	18,410	▲	11.4%
U.S. Decennial Census; 1790–1960 1900–1990; 1990–2000 2010

=== 2020 census ===
As of the 2020 census, the county had a population of 16,521. The median age was 42.8 years. 22.8% of residents were under the age of 18 and 19.8% of residents were 65 years of age or older. For every 100 females there were 100.4 males, and for every 100 females age 18 and over there were 99.1 males age 18 and over.

The racial makeup of the county was 86.4% White, 0.2% Black or African American, 1.4% American Indian and Alaska Native, 0.6% Asian, 1.5% Native Hawaiian and Pacific Islander, 2.9% from some other race, and 7.0% from two or more races. Hispanic or Latino residents of any race comprised 5.4% of the population.

<0.1% of residents lived in urban areas, while 100.0% lived in rural areas.

There were 6,437 households in the county, of which 31.0% had children under the age of 18 living in them. Of all households, 53.4% were married-couple households, 18.8% were households with a male householder and no spouse or partner present, and 21.7% were households with a female householder and no spouse or partner present. About 26.3% of all households were made up of individuals and 12.5% had someone living alone who was 65 years of age or older.

There were 7,611 housing units, of which 15.4% were vacant. Among occupied housing units, 78.1% were owner-occupied and 21.9% were renter-occupied. The homeowner vacancy rate was 1.1% and the rental vacancy rate was 7.5%.

=== 2000 census ===
As of the 2000 census, there were 14,243 people, 5,463 households, and 4,080 families residing in the county. The population density was 7/km^{2} (18/mi^{2}). There were 6,537 housing units at an average density of 3/km^{2} (7.8/mi^{2}). The racial makeup of the county was 95.94% White, 0.11% Black or African American, 1.22% Native American, 0.06% Asian, 0.09% Pacific Islander, 1.47% from other races, and 1.10% from two or more races. 3.06% of the population were Hispanic or Latino of any race.

There were 5,463 households, out of which 33.90% had children under the age of 18 living with them, 63.00% were married couples living together, 7.90% had a female householder with no husband present, and 25.30% were non-families. 22.40% of all households were made up of individuals, and 10.40% had someone living alone who was 65 years of age or older. The average household size was 2.59 and the average family size was 3.03.

In the county, the population was spread out, with 26.80% under the age of 18, 7.50% from 18 to 24, 27.00% from 25 to 44, 24.30% from 45 to 64, and 14.40% who were 65 years of age or older. The median age was 38 years. For every 100 females, there were 99.70 males. For every 100 females age 18 and over, there were 97.30 males.

The median income for a household in the county was $27,895, and the median income for a family was $32,910. Males had a median income of $24,911 versus $18,786 for females. The per capita income for the county was $14,736. About 14.70% of families and 18.60% of the population were below the poverty line, including 24.60% of those under age 18 and 18.00% of those age 65 or over.

== Government ==
=== Government ===
The county government is a constitutional body granted specific powers by the Constitution of Arkansas and the Arkansas Code. The quorum court is the legislative branch of the county government and controls all spending and revenue collection. Representatives are called justices of the peace and are elected from county districts every even-numbered year. The number of districts in a county vary from nine to fifteen, and district boundaries are drawn by the county election commission. The Madison County Quorum Court has nine members. Presiding over quorum court meetings is the county judge, who serves as the chief operating officer of the county. The county judge is elected at-large and does not vote in quorum court business, although capable of vetoing quorum court decisions.

Madison County, Arkansas Elected countywide officials
Position	Officeholder	Party
County Judge	Larry Garret	Republican
County Clerk	Austin Boatright	Republican
Circuit Clerk	Tiffany McDaniel	Republican
Sheriff	Ronnie Boyd	Republican
Treasurer	Amanda Born	Republican
Collector	Chera Glenn	Republican
Assessor	Christal Odgen	Republican
Coroner	Douglas Rabold	Republican
Surveyor	Jim Cagle	(Unknown)

The composition of the Quorum Court following the 2024 elections is 9 Republicans. Justices of the Peace (members) of the Quorum Court following the elections are:

- District 1: Bob Rawson (R) of Hindsville
- District 2: Cord Riley (R) of Hindsville
- District 3: Jason Yates (R) of Huntsville
- District 4: Sam Roddy (R) of Huntsville
- District 5: Wendy Pettz (R) of Huntsville
- District 6: Shannon Fancher (R) of Huntsville
- District 7: Joe Wilson (R) of Wesley
- District 8: Jeff Marley (R) of Elkins
- District 9: Michael Keck (R) of Huntsville

Additionally, the townships of Madison County are entitled to elect their own respective constables, as set forth by the Constitution of Arkansas. Constables are largely of historical significance as they were used to keep the peace in rural areas when travel was more difficult. The township constables as of the 2024 elections are:

- North Township: Gary Martin (R)
- South Township: Wes Walters (R)

=== Politics ===
During the Secession Convention of 1861, Arkansas voted to leave the Union and join the Confederate States of America. When Chairman David Walker called for a second vote seeking a unanimous decision, only Madison County representative Isaac Murphy refused to change his vote. Murphy would later be appointed Governor of Arkansas during Reconstruction under Abraham Lincoln's conciliatory policy.

Madison County is strongly Republican, and voted for the Republican candidate several times even when Arkansas was part of the "Solid South". A Democrat has carried the county only four times since 1940.

United States presidential election results for Madison County, Arkansas
Year	Republican		Democratic		Third party(ies)	
Year	No.	%	No.	%	No.	%
1896	1,260	42.25%	1,689	56.64%	33	1.11%
1900	1,289	46.52%	1,475	53.23%	7	0.25%
1904	1,160	50.94%	1,072	47.08%	45	1.98%
1908	1,541	50.28%	1,441	47.01%	83	2.71%
1912	786	38.91%	932	46.14%	302	14.95%
1916	1,332	47.78%	1,456	52.22%	0	0.00%
1920	1,715	53.10%	1,463	45.29%	52	1.61%
1924	1,263	46.85%	1,335	49.52%	98	3.64%
1928	2,760	61.33%	1,717	38.16%	23	0.51%
1932	2,197	43.12%	2,803	55.01%	95	1.86%
1936	1,484	46.86%	1,679	53.02%	4	0.13%
1940	2,107	48.91%	2,196	50.97%	5	0.12%
1944	2,120	54.25%	1,788	45.75%	0	0.00%
1948	2,201	51.22%	2,041	47.50%	55	1.28%
1952	2,868	57.51%	2,110	42.31%	9	0.18%
1956	2,525	53.54%	2,186	46.35%	5	0.11%
1960	2,445	58.20%	1,702	40.51%	54	1.29%
1964	1,997	42.26%	2,715	57.45%	14	0.30%
1968	2,320	47.14%	1,574	31.98%	1,028	20.89%
1972	3,372	64.09%	1,889	35.91%	0	0.00%
1976	2,502	46.09%	2,926	53.91%	0	0.00%
1980	3,180	54.50%	2,434	41.71%	221	3.79%
1984	3,516	61.65%	2,133	37.40%	54	0.95%
1988	3,067	58.72%	2,106	40.32%	50	0.96%
1992	2,238	42.41%	2,415	45.76%	624	11.82%
1996	2,303	43.01%	2,504	46.76%	548	10.23%
2000	3,387	60.18%	2,055	36.51%	186	3.30%
2004	3,873	60.67%	2,421	37.92%	90	1.41%
2008	3,972	62.77%	2,144	33.88%	212	3.35%
2012	4,263	64.91%	2,099	31.96%	206	3.14%
2016	4,928	72.04%	1,588	23.21%	325	4.75%
2020	5,658	76.97%	1,563	21.26%	130	1.77%
2024	5,885	78.46%	1,491	19.88%	125	1.67%

== Transportation ==
=== Major highways ===
- U.S. Highway 412
- Highway 12
- Highway 16
- Highway 21
- Highway 23
- Highway 45
- Highway 74
- Highway 127
- Highway 295
- Highway 303
- Highway 980

=== Airport ===
The Huntsville Municipal Airport is a public-use airport located two nautical miles (4 km) southwest of the central business district of Huntsville.

== Communities ==
=== City ===
- Huntsville (county seat)

=== Towns ===
- Hindsville
- St. Paul

=== Census-designated places ===
- Kingston
- Wesley

=== Unincorporated communities ===
- Aurora
- Clifty
- Combs
- Delaney
- Forum
- Japton
- Marble
- Pettigrew
- Weathers
- Witter

=== Townships ===
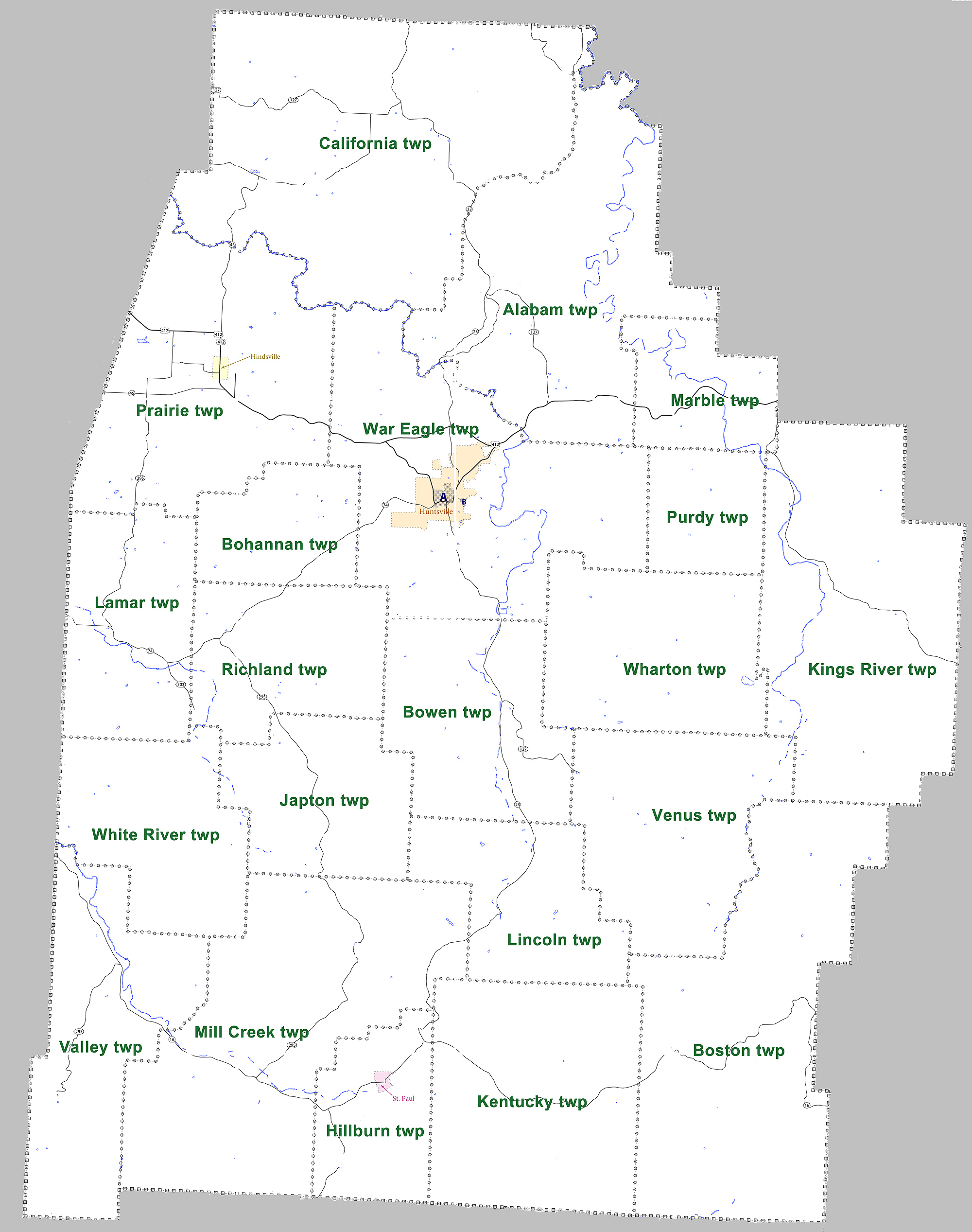
Townships in Madison County, Arkansas as of 2010

Townships in Arkansas are the divisions of a county. Each township includes unincorporated areas; some may have incorporated cities or towns within part of their boundaries. Arkansas townships have limited purposes in modern times. However, the United States census does list Arkansas population based on townships (sometimes referred to as "county subdivisions" or "minor civil divisions"). Townships are also of value for historical purposes in terms of genealogical research. Each town or city is within one or more townships in an Arkansas county based on census maps and publications. The townships of Madison County are listed below; listed in parentheses are the cities, towns, and/or census-designated places that are fully or partially inside the township.

Township	FIPS code	ANSI code (GNIS ID)	Population center(s)	Pop. (2010)	Pop. density (/mi^{2})	Pop. density (/km^{2})	Total area (mi^{2})	Total area (km^{2})	Land area (mi^{2})	Land area (km^{2})	Water area (mi^{2})	Water area (km^{2})	Geographic coordinates
Alabam	05-90009	00068839		1,261	21.90	8.46	57.903	150.0	57.572	149.1	0.331	0.8573	36.191194°N 93.669170°W
Bohannan	05-90392	00068840		631	36.81	14.21	17.202	44.55	17.140	44.39	0.062	0.1606	36.085717°N 93.821228°W
Boston	05-90414	00068841		168	2.54	0.98	66.351	171.8	66.267	171.6	0.084	0.2176	35.849404°N 93.576730°W
Bowen	05-90426	00068842		486	15.18	5.86	32.123	83.20	32.013	82.91	0.110	0.2849	35.975305°N 93.722794°W
California	05-90426	00068842		1,303	15.36	5.93	85.034	220.2	84.848	219.8	0.186	0.4817	36.255402°N 93.770360°W
Hilburn	05-91722	00068844	St. Paul	310	16.39	6.33	18.942	49.06	18.914	48.99	0.028	0.07252	35.797425°N 93.760126°W
Japton	05-91902	00068845		441	17.28	6.67	25.603	66.31	25.528	66.12	0.075	0.1942	35.955531°N 93.793701°W
Kentucky	05-92028	00068846		265	5.82	2.25	45.546	118.0	45.508	117.9	0.038	0.09842	35.822760°N 93.677824°W
Kings River	05-92055	00068847		769	12.16	4.69	63.474	164.4	63.229	163.8	0.245	0.6345	36.035554°N 93.503218°W
Lamar	05-92103	00068848		949	33.88	13.08	28.138	72.88	28.010	72.55	0.128	0.3315	36.032938°N 93.909403°W
Lincoln	05-92208	00068849		229	9.19	3.55	24.982	64.70	24.920	64.54	0.062	0.1606	35.902011°N 93.686265°W
Marble	05-92367	00068850		318	19.48	7.52	16.398	42.47	16.323	42.28	0.166	0.4299	36.131296°N 93.598757°W
Mill Creek	05-92481	00068851		610	9.44	3.65	64.711	167.6	64.590	167.3	0.121	0.3134	35.845829°N 93.826426°W
Prairie	05-93000	00068852	Hindsville	1,632	31.40	12.12	52.182	135.2	51.976	134.6	0.206	0.5335	36.140250°N 93.870069°W
Purdy	05-93048	00068853		314	2.45	8.67	14.029	36.33	13.989	36.23	0.040	0.1036	36.088293°N 93.592540°W
Richland	05-93144	00068854		567	21.56	8.32	26.372	68.30	26.299	68.11	0.073	0.1891	36.022251°N 93.835944°W
Valley	05-93759	00068855		517	13.88	5.36	37.414	96.90	37.235	96.44	0.179	0.4636	35.850483°N 93.918223°W
Venus	05-93792	00068856		244	6.65	2.53	36.783	95.27	36.717	95.10	0.066	0.1709	35.939655°N 93.605466°W
War Eagle	05-93888	00068857	Huntsville	4,037	67.55	26.08	60.177	155.9	59.762	154.8	0.415	1.075	36.091926°N 93.717540°W
Wharton	05-93976	01986189		418	12.24	4.72	34.308	88.86	34.160	88.47	0.148	0.3833	36.008463°N 93.619431°W
White River	05-94017	00068859		248	8.48	3.27	29.317	75.93	29.255	75.77	0.062	0.1606	35.948524°N 93.892882°W
Source: "Census 2010 U.S. Gazetteer Files: County Subdivisions in Arkansas". U.S. Census Bureau, Geography Division. Archived from the original on May 31, 2014. Source: "Census 2010 U.S. Gazetteer Files". U.S. Census Bureau, Geography Division.

== Notable residents ==
- Orval E. Faubus (1910–1994), governor of Arkansas during the desegregation days, was from the Combs community near Huntsville. He is buried in Combs Cemetery.
- Ronnie Hawkins, rockabilly singer. His backing band, The Hawks, later played with Bob Dylan and eventually became The Band.
- Danny L. Patrick, Republican member of the Arkansas House of Representatives from Madison and Carroll counties from 1967 to 1970.
- John Selman, outlaw and lawman, best known for killing John Wesley Hardin in 1895, was born in Madison County.
- Charles Whorton Jr., Democrat Member of the Arkansas House of Representatives 1991 to1998, Madison County Judge 1973 to 1988, Madison County Clerk 1955 to 1972
- George William Fullerton (1923–2009), He is credited with design contributions that led to the manufacture of the first mass-produced solid-body electric guitar.

== See also ==
- Cooks Venture, former poultry company with presence in the county
- List of lakes in Madison County, Arkansas
- National Register of Historic Places listings in Madison County, Arkansas
