= War Eagle (disambiguation) =

War Eagle is the battle cry, yell, or motto of Auburn University.

War Eagle may also refer to:

== Places in the United States ==
- War Eagle, Arkansas, an unincorporated community
- War Eagle, West Virginia, an unincorporated community in Mingo County
- War Eagle Creek, a river in Arkansas
  - War Eagle Bridge, a historic bridge in War Eagle, Arkansas
  - War Eagle Creek Bridge, a bridge crossing the War Eagle Creek in Madison County, Arkansas
  - War Eagle Mill, a working gristmill located on War Eagle Creek
- War Eagle Field, a former airfield in the Mojave Desert

== People ==
- War Eagle (American football), Native American football player
- War Eagle (Dakota Leader), a Yankton Sioux Chief
- John War Eagle

== Other ==
- War Eagle Conference, an athletic conference in Iowa
- "War Eagle," an episode of the drama series Longmire
- War Eagle, Arkansas (film), a 2007 film
