= Arkansas Highway 127 =

State highway in Arkansas

Highway 127

Route information
- Maintained by ArDOT
- Existed: c. 1927-1928–present

Section 1
- Length: 4.13 mi (6.65 km)
- South end: End state maintenance at CR 3345
- North end: AR 23 at Aurora

Section 2
- Length: 4.86 mi (7.82 km)
- South end: US 412 at Old Alabam
- North end: AR 23 at Forum

Section 3
- Length: 8.58 mi (13.81 km)
- West end: AR 12 at Lookout
- East end: AR 12 northeast of Clifty

Section 4
- Length: 5.82 mi (9.37 km)
- South end: Buckhorn Cir at Lost Bridge Village
- North end: US 62 in Garfield

Location
- Country: United States
- State: Arkansas
- Counties: Madison, Benton

Highway system
- Arkansas Highway System; Interstate; US; State; Business; Spurs; Suffixed; Scenic; Heritage
| ← AR 126 | → AR 128 |

Highway 127 (AR 127, Ark. 127, and Hwy. 127) is a designation for four state highways in Northwest Arkansas. One route of 4.13 miles (6.65 km) begins at Madison County Road 3345 (CR 3345) and runs northwest to Highway 23 at Aurora. A second route of 4.86 miles (7.82 km) begins at US Highway 412 (US 412) at Old Alabam and runs north to Highway 23 at Forum. A third route of 8.58 miles (13.81 km) begins at Highway 12 and runs north to Highway 12 near Clifty. A fourth route of 5.82 miles (9.37 km) begins at Lost Bridge Village and runs north to US Highway 62 in Garfield. Highway 127 Spur is a spur route of 0.25 miles (0.40 km) near the southern terminus of the Lost Bridge Village route that provides access to Lost Bridge Marina. All routes are maintained by the Arkansas State Highway and Transportation Department (AHTD).

== Route description ==
=== Aurora ===
The route begins state maintenance at Madison CR 3345 near a junction with Madison CR 3225. Highway 127 winds northwest to Aurora, where it terminates at Highway 23, the Pig Trail Scenic Byway. The route was built in 1985.

=== Old Alabam to Forum ===
It runs northwest from US 412 near Old Alabam to AR 23 in Forum near Withrow Springs State Park.

=== Lookout to Clifty ===
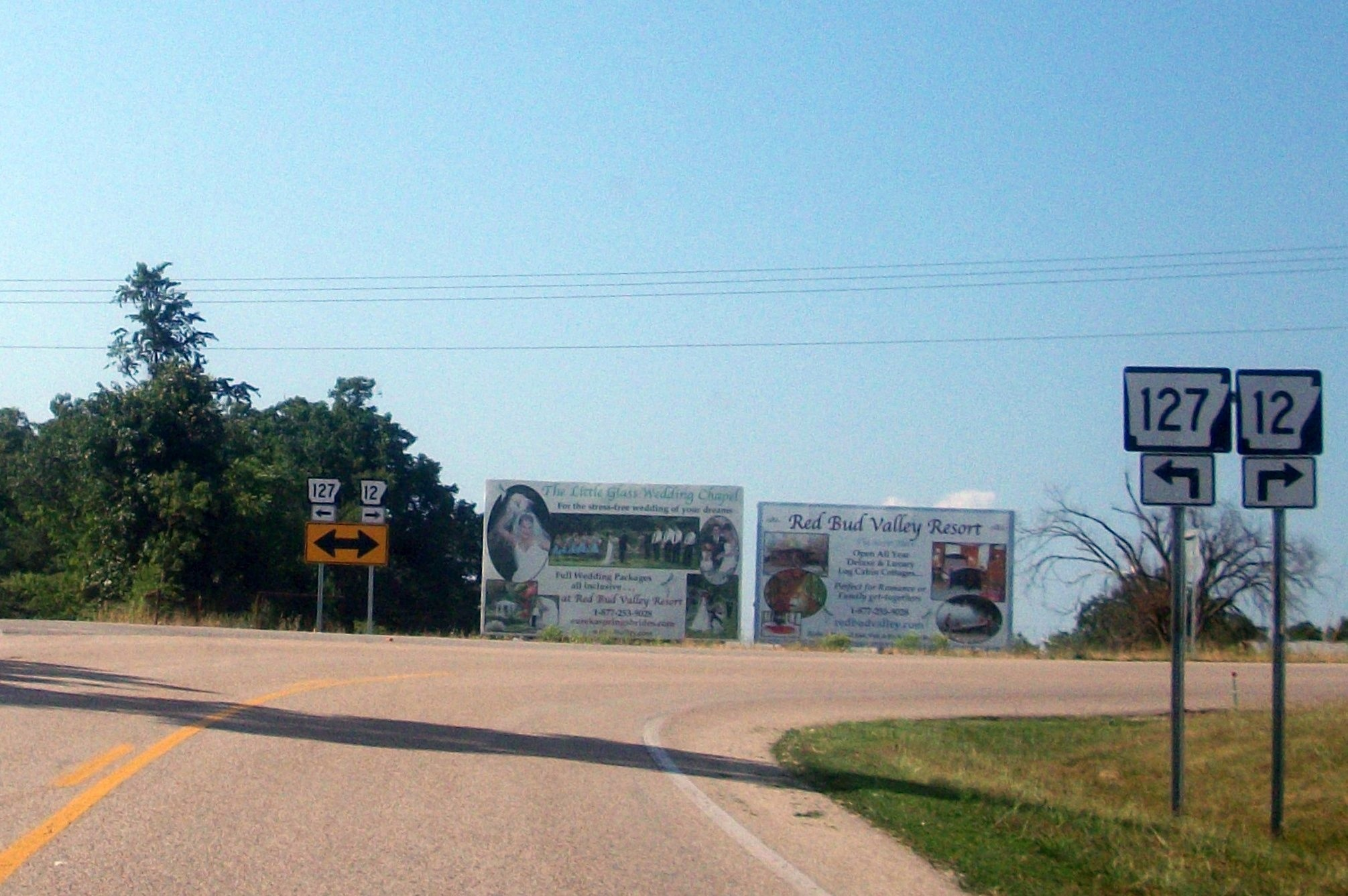
Highway 127 and Highway 12 split near Clifty.

It runs east from AR 12 at Lookout near Hobbs State Park to terminate at AR 12 northeast of Clifty.

=== Lost Bridge Village to Garfield ===
It runs north from Lost Bridge Village to US 62 in Garfield.

== History ==
Highway 127 was first designated between 1927 and September 1, 1928, by renumbering State Road 19 between Old Alabam and Forum. A second segment of Highway 127 was created from Highway 12 to Beaver Lake on August 25, 1965. The highway was rerouted on June 7, 1995, at the request of the Benton county judge to connect to Highway 12 on both ends, and the former alignment was turned back to county maintenance. The segment of Highway 127 between Garfield and Lost Bridge Village was created on November 23, 1966. The Aurora segment was created on June 28, 1973, pursuant to Act 9 of 1973 by the Arkansas General Assembly. The act directed county judges and legislators to designate up to 12 miles (19 km) of county roads as state highways in each county.

== Major intersections ==
| County | Location | mi | km | Destinations | Notes |
|---|---|---|---|---|---|
| Madison | | 0.00 | 0.00 | End state maintenance at CR 3345 | Southern terminus |
| Madison | Aurora | 4.13 | 6.65 | AR 23 (Pig Trail Scenic Byway) – Huntsville, Ozark | Northern terminus |
| Madison | Gap in route | | | | |
| Madison | Old Alabam | 0.00 | 0.00 | US 412 – Alpena, Huntsville | Southern terminus |
| Madison | Forum | 4.86 | 7.82 | AR 23 (Pig Trail Scenic Byway) – Huntsville, Eureka Springs | Northern terminus |
| Madison | Gap in route | | | | |
| Madison | | 0.00 | 0.00 | AR 12 – Clifty | Southern terminus |
| Benton | Lookout | 8.58 | 13.81 | AR 12 – Clifty, Rogers | Northern terminus |
| Benton | Gap in route | | | | |
| Benton | Lost Bridge Village | 0.00 | 0.00 | End state maintenance at Buckhorn Circle | Southern terminus |
| Benton | Lost Bridge Village | | | AR 127S south | AR 127S northern terminus |
| Benton | Garfield | 5.82 | 9.37 | US 62 (Marshall St) | Northern terminus |
1.000 mi = 1.609 km; 1.000 km = 0.621 mi

== Spur route ==
Highway 127S
- Location: Lost Bridge Use Area
- Length: 0.25 mi (400 m)
- Existed: August 27, 1969–present

Highway 127 Spur (AR 127S, Ark. 127S, and Hwy. 127S) is a short spur route in Lost Springs Village of 0.25 miles (0.40 km).

=== Route description ===
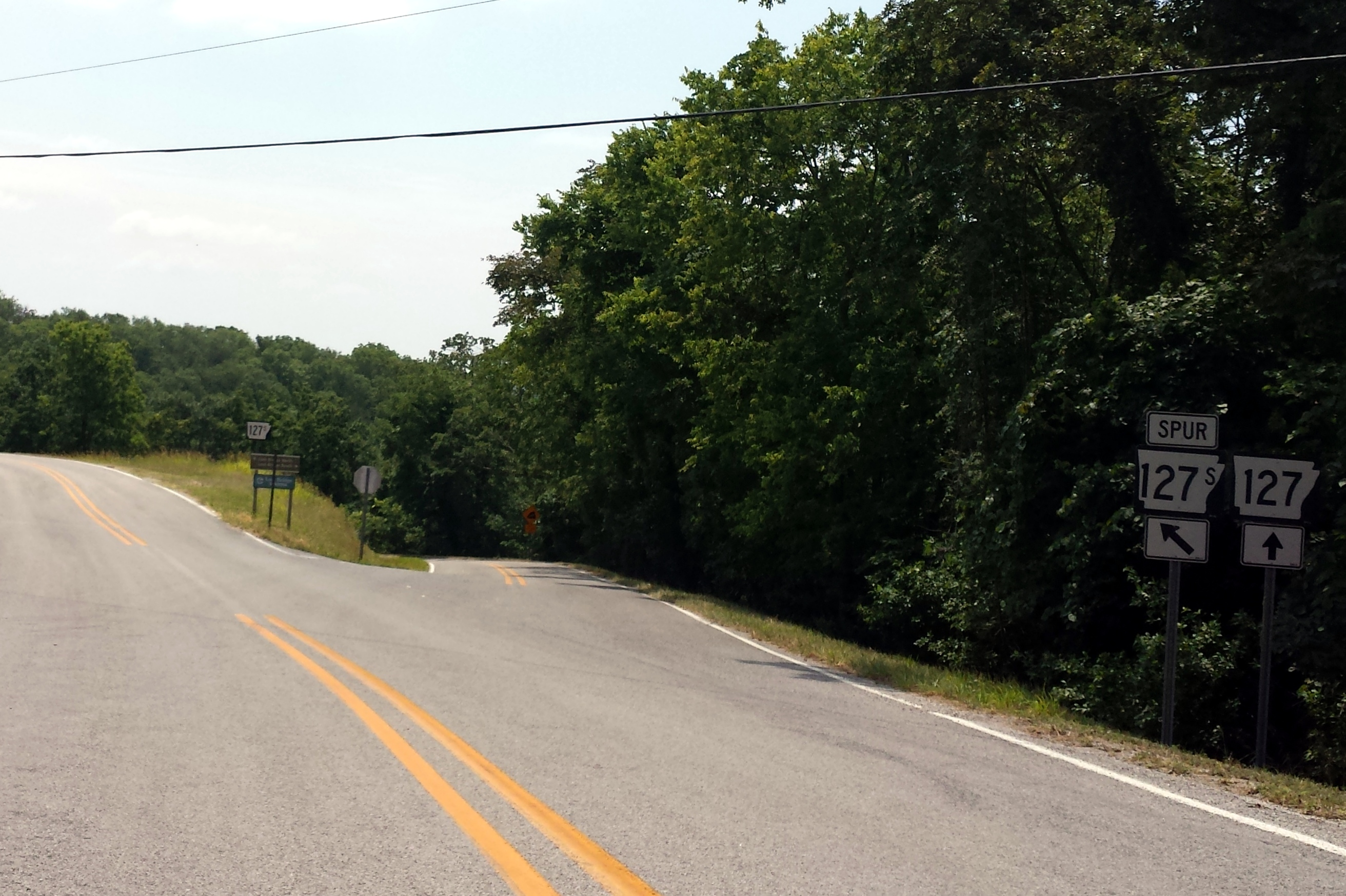
Highway 127 and Highway 127S split near Beaver Lake

The route begins at Highway 127 near Lost Bridge Marina, southeast of Garfield and ends at the north access road to Lost Bridge Public Use Area.

=== History ===
The spur route was created by the Arkansas State Highway Commission on August 27, 1969.

=== Major intersections ===
The entire route is in Lost Bridge Village, Benton County.

| mi | km | Destinations | Notes |
|---|---|---|---|
| 0.00 | 0.00 | AR 127 – Garfield | Northern terminus |
| 0.25 | 0.40 | End state maintenance at Marina Rd/Pine Log Rd | Southern terminus |
1.000 mi = 1.609 km; 1.000 km = 0.621 mi

== See also ==
- List of state highways in Arkansas
