= Arkansas Highway 23 =

Highway in Arkansas

Highway 23
- Pig Trail Scenic Byway

Route information
- Maintained by ArDOT
- Length: 133.9 mi (215.5 km)
- Existed: 1926–present

Major junctions
- South end: US 71 near Elm Park
- AR 10 in Booneville; US 64 in Ozark; I-40 in Ozark; US 412 in Huntsville; US 62 in Eureka Springs
- North end: Route P at the Missouri state line near Holiday Island

Location
- Country: United States
- State: Arkansas
- Counties: Scott, Logan, Franklin, Madison, Carroll

Highway system
- Arkansas Highway System; Interstate; US; State; Business; Spurs; Suffixed; Scenic; Heritage
← AR 22	→ AR 24

Arkansas Highway 23 (AR 23) is a north–south state highway in north Arkansas. The route runs 133.9 miles (215.5 km) from U.S. Route 71 (US 71) north of Elm Park north to the Missouri state line through Ozark and Eureka Springs. Between Highway 16 at Brashears and Interstate 40 (I-40) north of Ozark, Highway 23 winds through the Ozark National Forest and is designated as the Pig Trail Scenic Byway due to its steep hills and hairpin turns. The route has a strong connection with the University of Arkansas Razorbacks, connecting fans in Central Arkansas with the Northwest Arkansas area.

== Route description ==
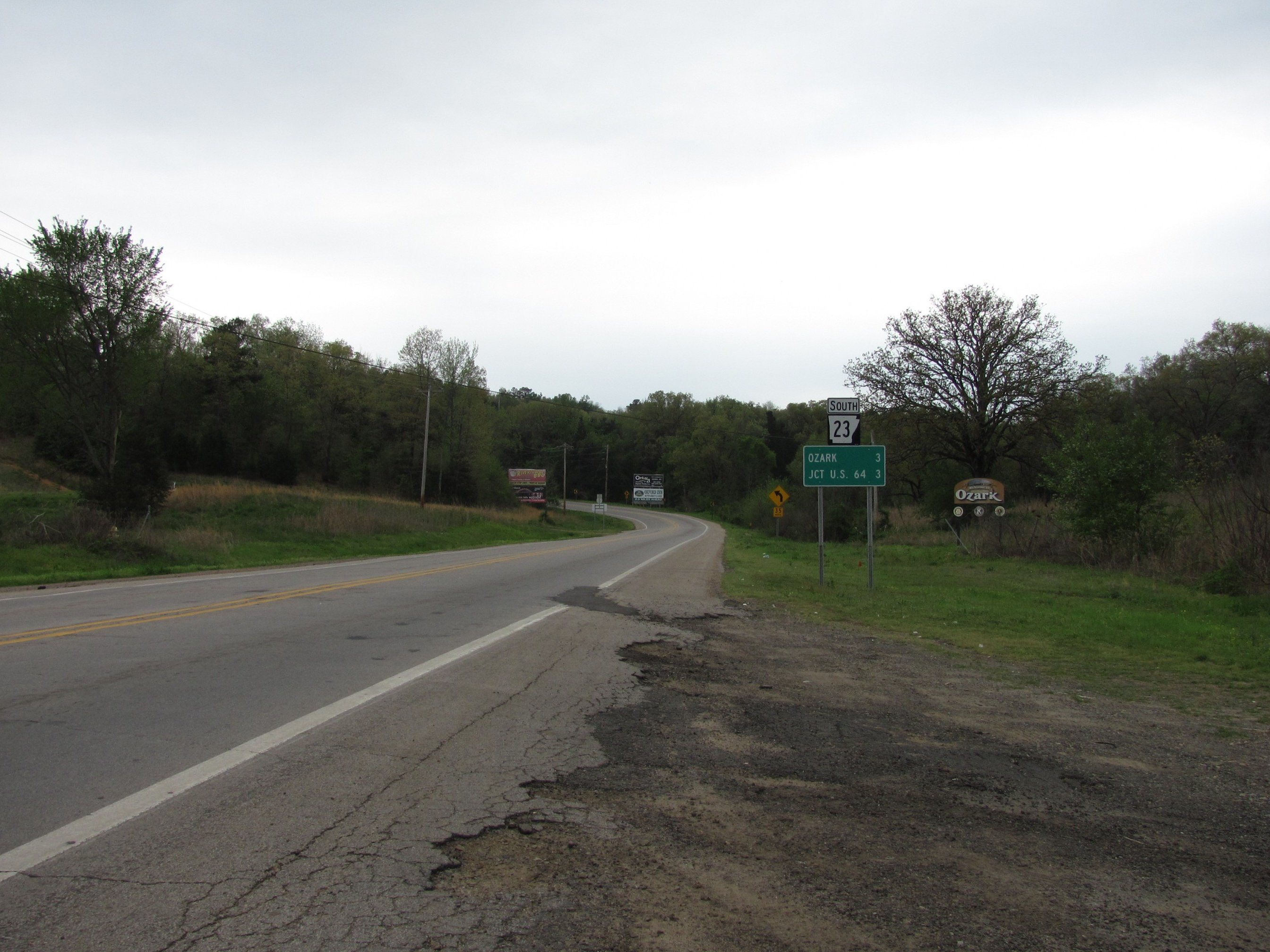
Southbound in Ozark, Arkansas

Highway 23 begins at US 71 north of Elm Park and runs northeast to Booneville. The route intersects Highway 116 south of Booneville then crosses Highway 10 in Booneville before continuing north into Franklin County. Highway 23 travels through the Ouachita National Forest, winding through mountains and through thick woods.

Highway 23 eventually meets Highway 22 in Caulksville and Highway 41 near Chismville after which the route runs north across the Arkansas River to Ozark. Highway 23 meets US 64 in downtown Ozark and I-40 north of town. The route next enters Ozark National Forest. Highway 23 meets Highway 16 north of the forest west St. Paul where the two roads run concurrent.

Northeast of St Paul, Highway 23 and Highway 16 split and Highway 23 continues north through Madison County, meeting Highway 74 south of Huntsville and US 412B in Huntsville. North of town, Highway 23 crosses US 412. Highway 23 next passes Withrow Springs State Park, Highway 127 and Highway 12 before intersecting US 62 in Eureka Springs. Highway 23 and US 62 have a short concurrency before 23 turns north, passing Highway 187 near Holiday Island before terminating at the Missouri state line, where it continues as Supplemental Route P.

== Huntsville city route ==
Highway 23C
- Location: Huntsville
- Length: 0.23 mi (370 m)

Arkansas Highway 23C (AR 23C) is an unsigned city route in Huntsville. The route is 0.23 miles (0.37 km) beginning at Highway 23. It travels north and turns east, continuing west as US 412B. After briefly traveling to the east, the highway terminates at Highway 23 near the beginning of a concurrency with US 412B.

== Highway 23W ==
Highway 23W
- Location: Withrow Springs State Park
- Length: 2.65 mi (4.26 km)
- Existed: November 22, 1966–present

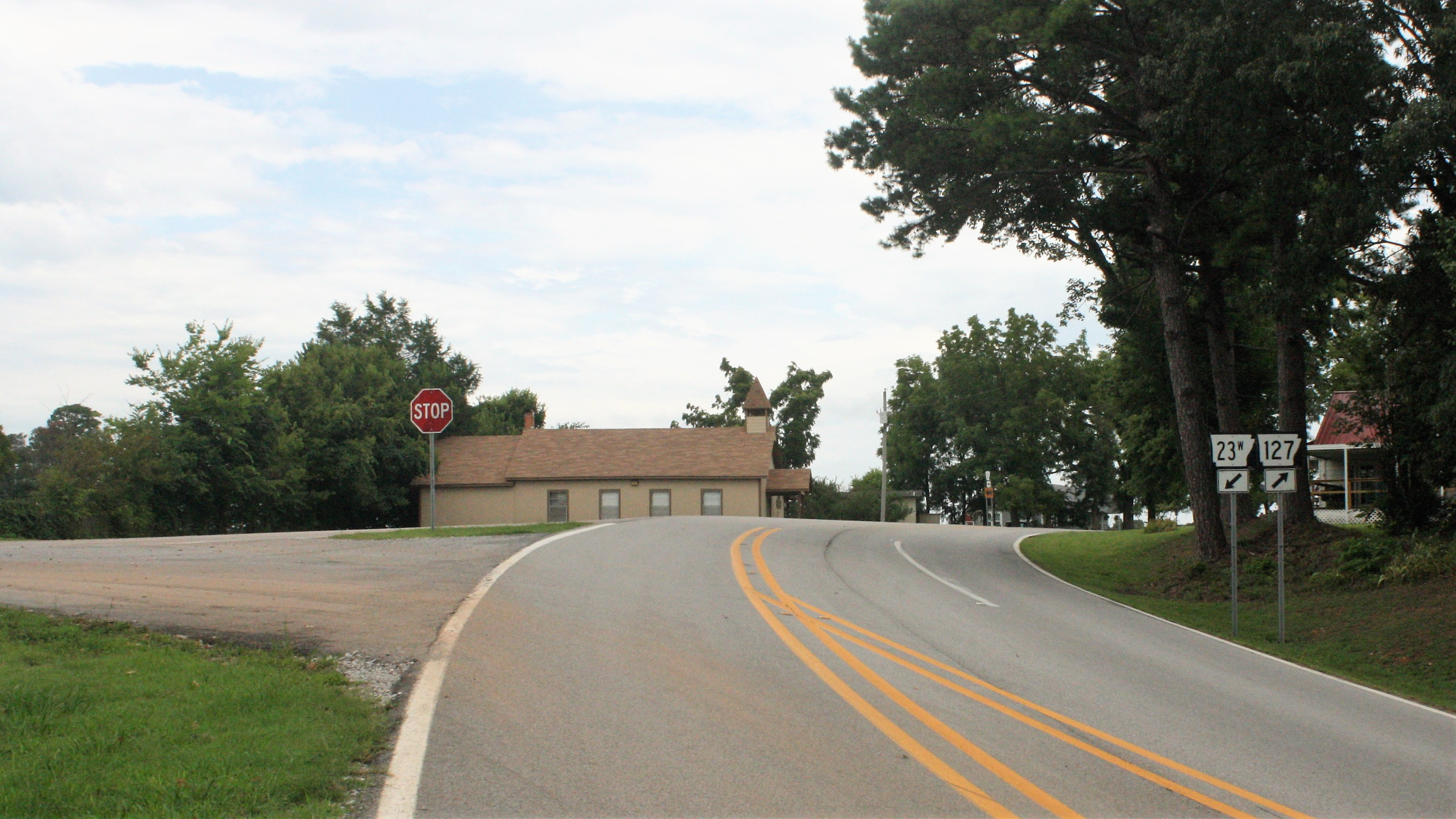
Northern terminus of Highway 23W at Forum. Highway 23W continues south (left) from this point.

Arkansas Highway 23W (AR 23W) is a 2.65-mile (4.26 km) long north–south loop west of Highway 23 in the northwestern part of the U.S. state of Arkansas. Its southern terminus is at Highway 23 south of Withrow Springs State Park. Its northern terminus is at an intersection with Highway 23 just south of Highway 127 at Forum, 7 miles (11 km) north of Huntsville. The highway serves as the primary north-south access road to the state park.

== Major intersections ==
Mile markers reset at some concurrencies.

County	Location	mi	km	Destinations	Notes
Scott		0.0	0.0	US 71 – Waldron, Fort Smith	Southern terminus
Logan		13.5	21.7	AR 116 east – Booneville Human Development Center	Western terminus of AR 116
Logan	Booneville	15.5	24.9	AR 217 south (East Magazine Street)	Northern terminus of AR 217
Logan	Booneville	15.9	25.6	AR 10 (Main Street) – Mount Magazine State Park	
Logan		17.0	27.4	AR 116 east	Western terminus of AR 116
Logan	Chismville	22.7	36.5	AR 217 north – Charleston	Southern terminus of AR 217
Logan		23.1	37.2	AR 41 north – Branch	Southern terminus of AR 41
Franklin	No major junctions				
Logan	Caulksville	29.7	47.8	AR 398	
Logan	Caulksville	31.1	50.1	AR 22 – Fort Smith, Paris	
Franklin		35.4	57.0	AR 288 to AR 41 – Roseville	
Franklin		41.7	67.1	AR 96 west – Cecil	Eastern terminus of AR 96
Franklin	Webb City	43.2	69.5	AR 309 south – Mount Magazine State Park	Northern terminus of AR 309
Franklin				Ozark Bridge over Arkansas River	
Franklin	Ozark	44.5	71.6	US 64 east – Clarksville	Southern end of US 64 concurrency
Franklin	Ozark	0.0	0.0	US 64 west – Alma	Northern end of US 64 concurrency
Franklin	Ozark	1.1	1.8	AR 96 east (Airport Road) – Airport	Western terminus of AR 96
Franklin	Ozark	3.2	5.1	I-40 – Fort Smith, Little Rock	Exit 35 on I-40
Franklin	White Oak	4.8	7.7	AR 352 east	Western terminus of AR 352
Franklin	Cass	17.2	27.7	AR 215 north	Southern terminus of AR 215
Madison	Brashears	27.7	44.6	AR 16 west – Fayetteville	Southern end of AR 16 concurrency
Madison		31.5	50.7	AR 16 east – Pettigrew	Northern end of AR 16 concurrency
Madison	Aurora	45.0	72.4	AR 127 south	Northern terminus of AR 127
Madison		47.8	76.9	AR 74 east – Kingston	Western terminus of AR 74
Madison	Huntsville	52.2	84.0	To US 412B west – Huntsville Business District	Access via AR 23C
Madison	Huntsville	52.5	84.5	US 412B west – Huntsville Business District	Southern end of US 412B concurrency
Madison	Huntsville	0.0	0.0	US 412B east – Alpena	Northern end of US 412B concurrency
Madison		1.9	3.1	US 412 to US 62 – Springdale	Interchange
Madison		4.2	6.8	Withrow Springs State Park	Access via AR 23W north
Madison	Forum			Withrow Springs State Park	Access via AR 23W south
Madison	Forum			AR 127 south – Alabam	Northern terminus of AR 127
Madison		15.7	25.3	AR 12 west to AR 127 – Clifty	Eastern terminus of AR 12
Carroll	Eureka Springs	25.9	41.7	US 62 east – Harrison	Southern end of US 62 concurrency
Carroll	Eureka Springs	0.0	0.0	US 62 west – Beaver Dam, Rogers, Bentonville	Northern end of US 62 concurrency
Carroll		4.6	7.4	AR 187 south – Beaver	Northern terminus of AR 187
Carroll		11.0	17.7	Route P north	Continuation into Missouri
1.000 mi = 1.609 km; 1.000 km = 0.621 mi: Concurrency terminus

== Gallery ==
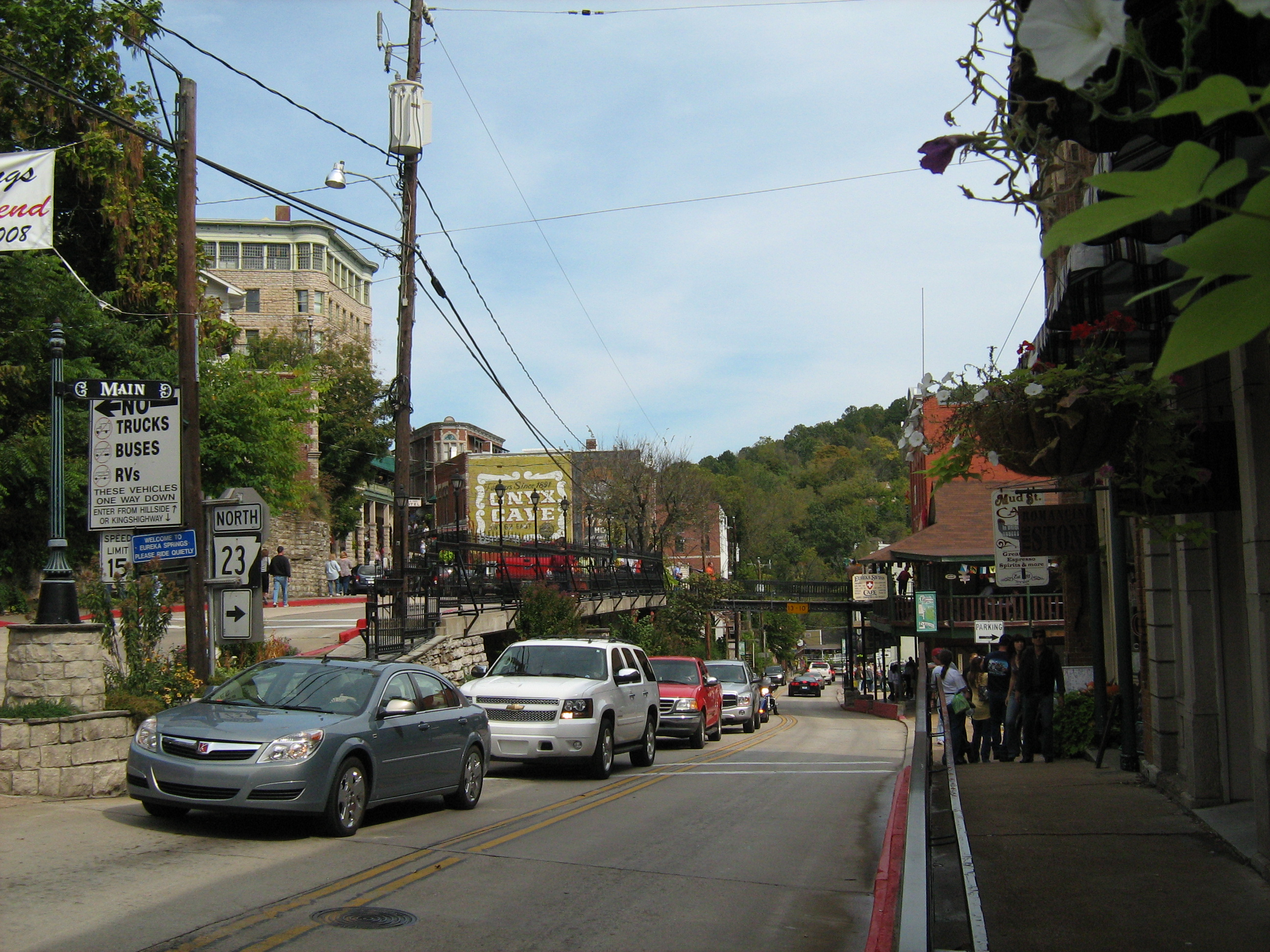
Eureka Springs, AR

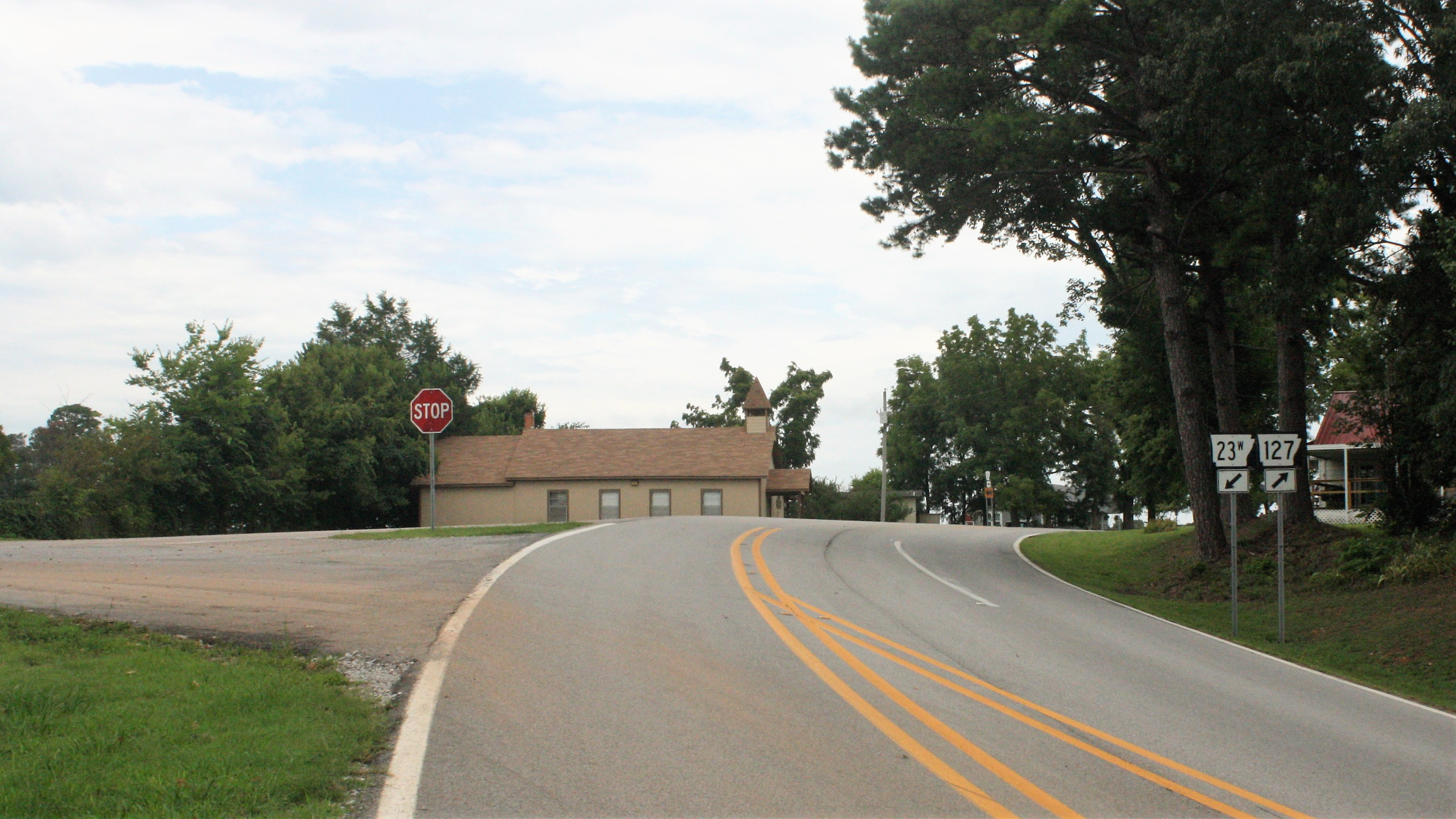
Northern Terminus of 23W

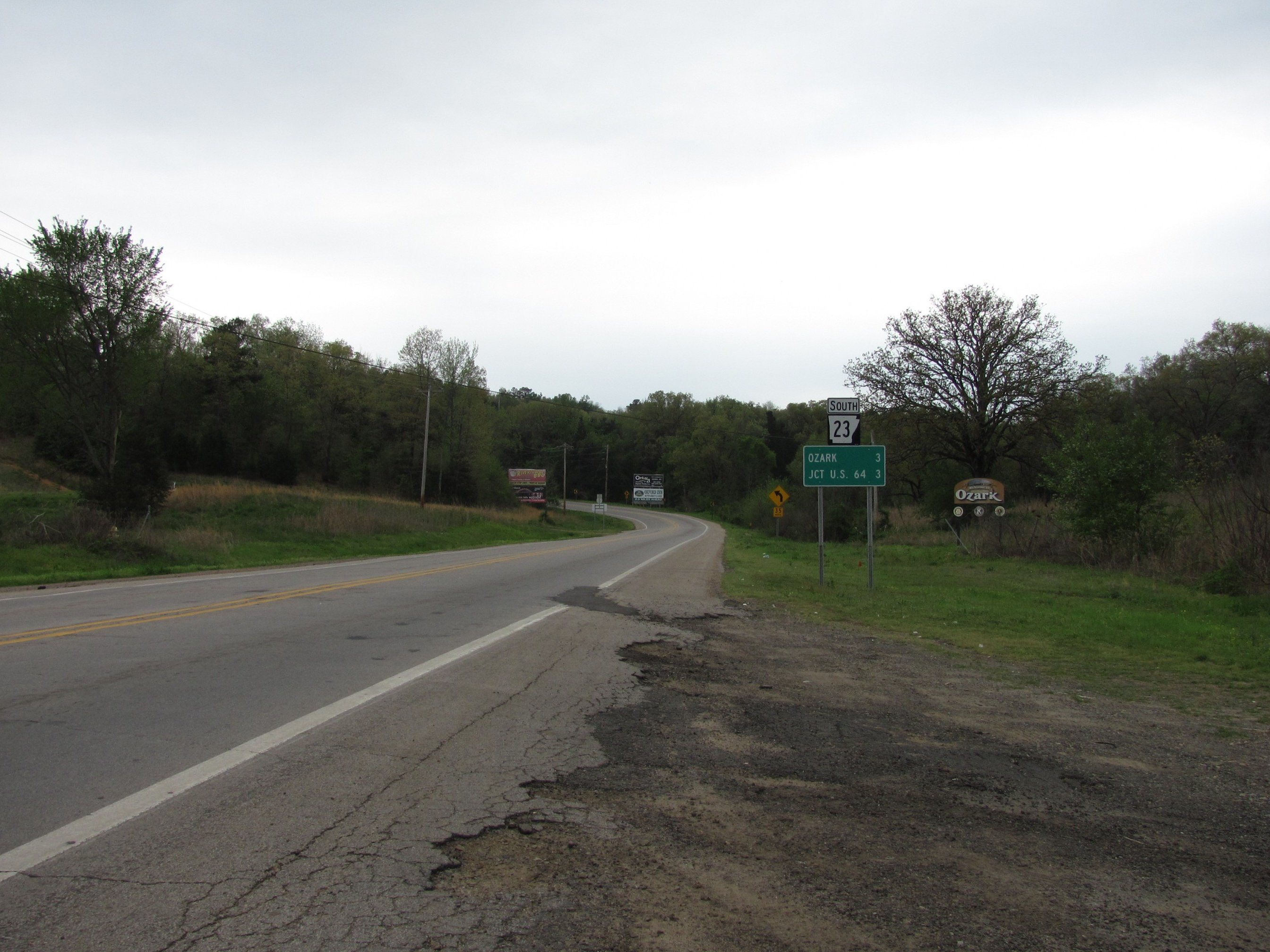
Ozark, AR

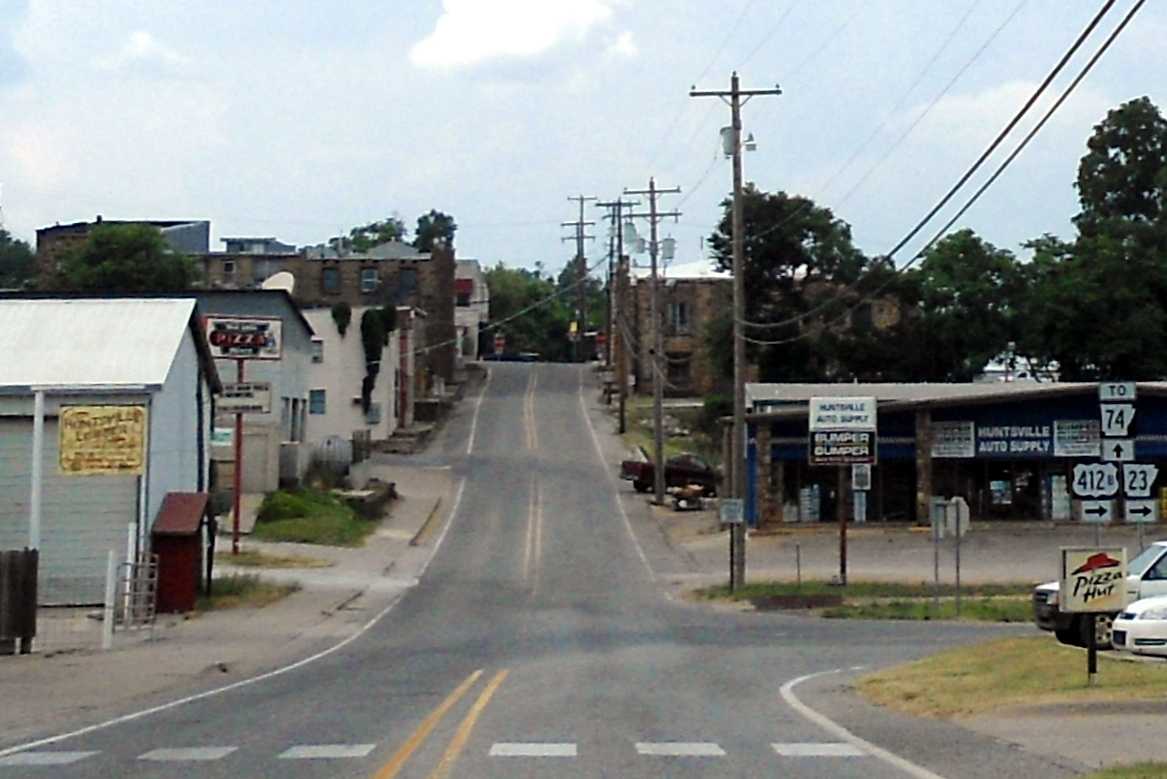
Huntsville, AR

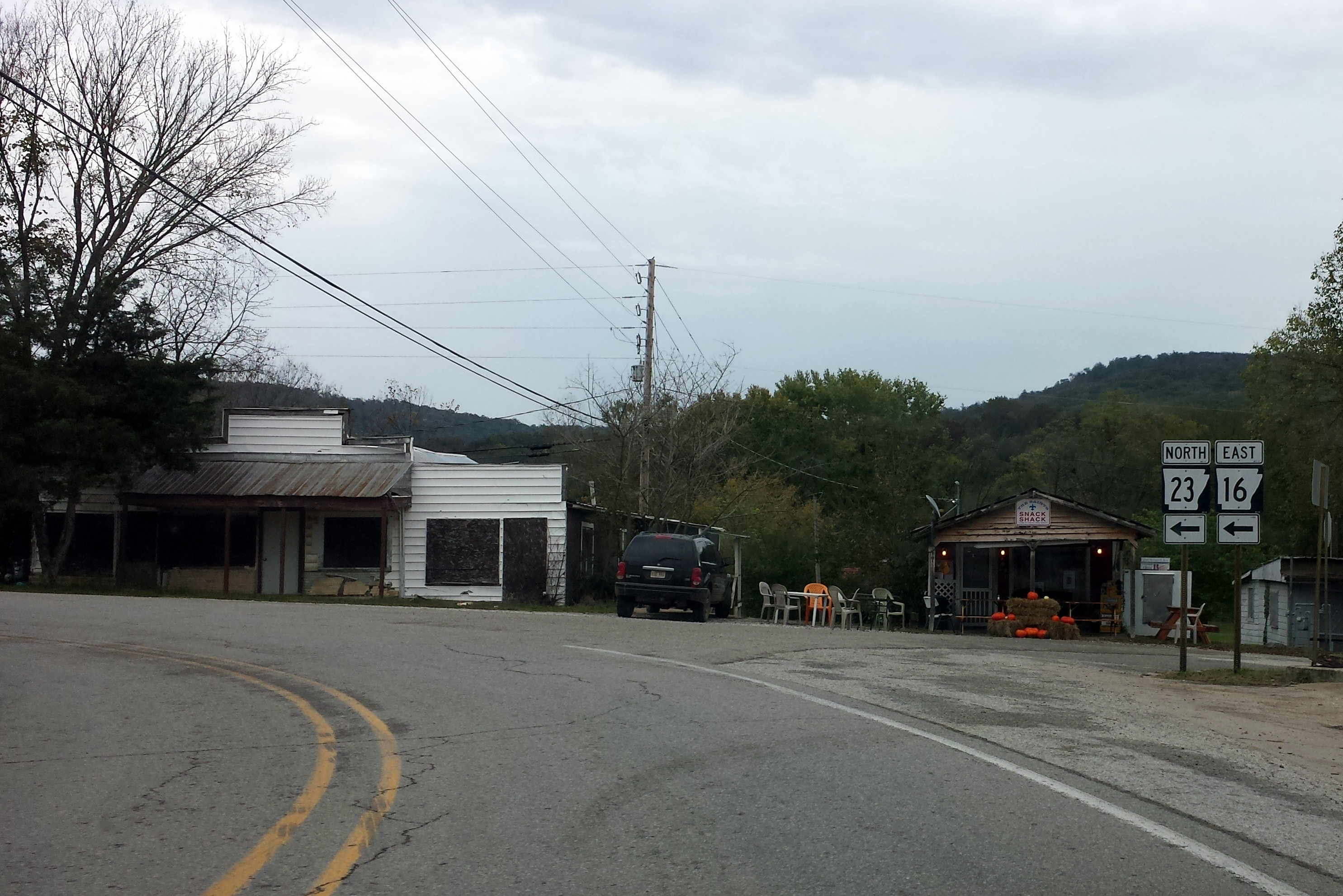
St. Paul, AR

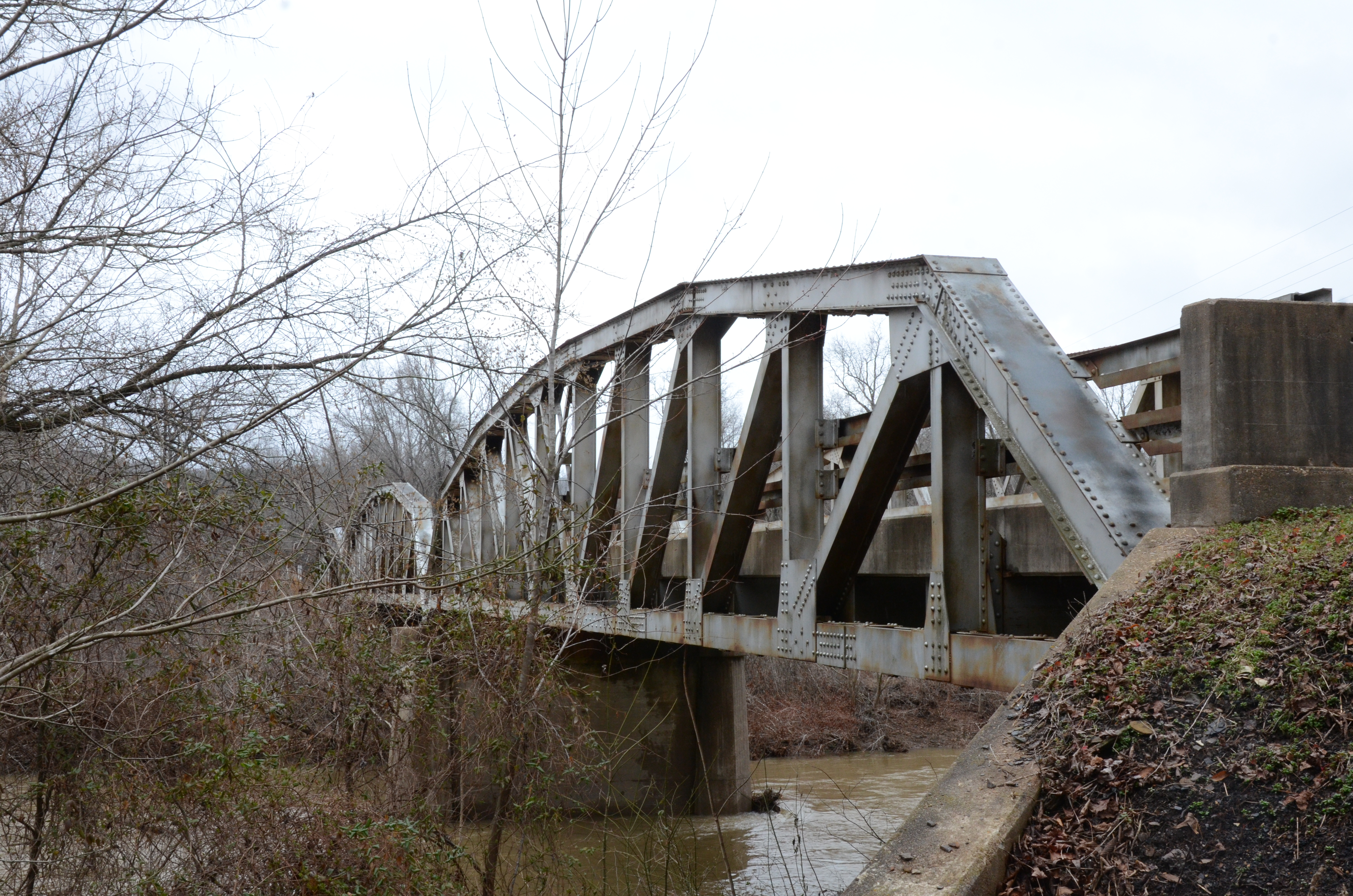
Mulberry River Bridge

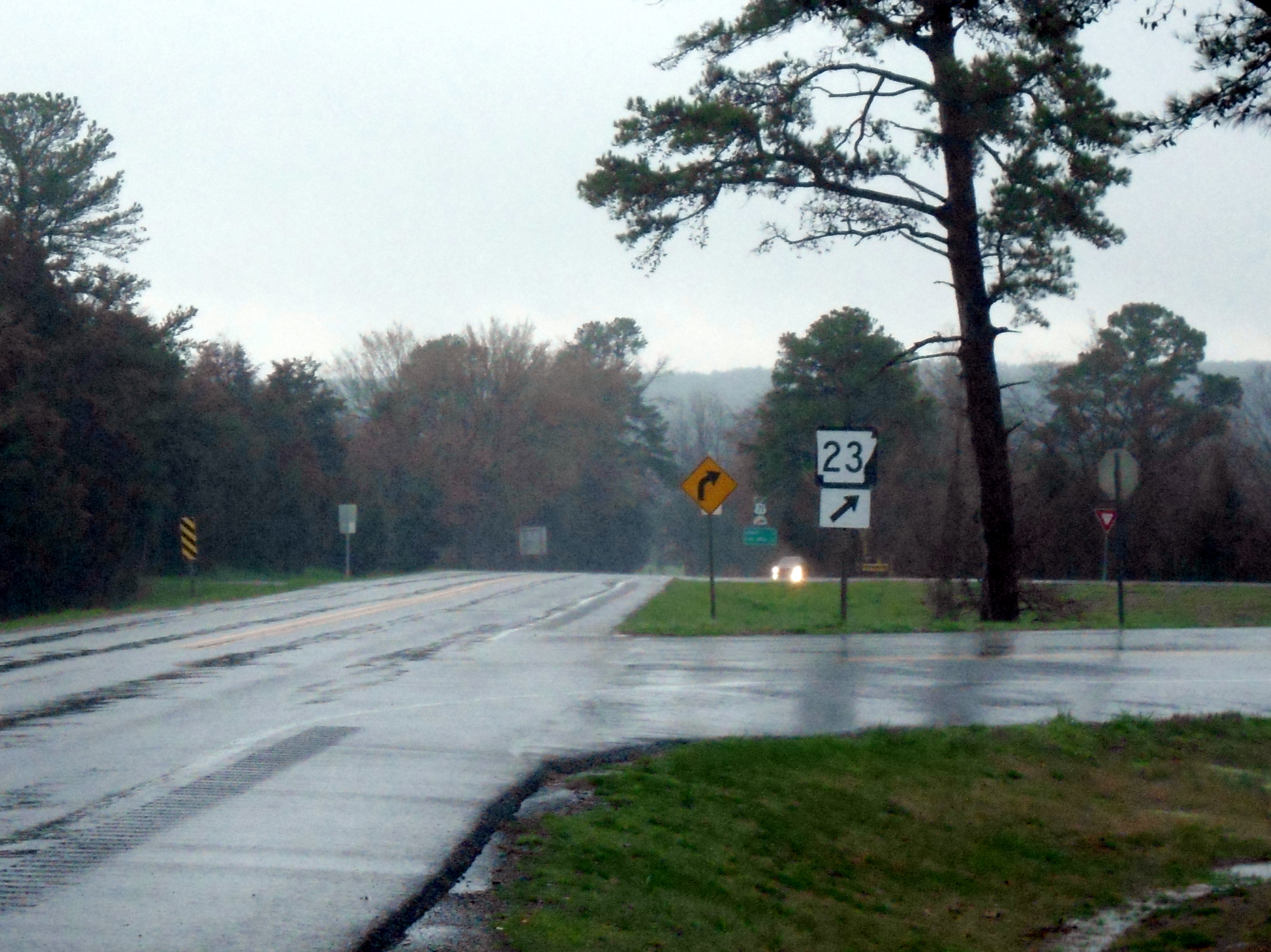
Southern terminus
