= War Eagle Creek Bridge =

- U.S. National Register of Historic Places
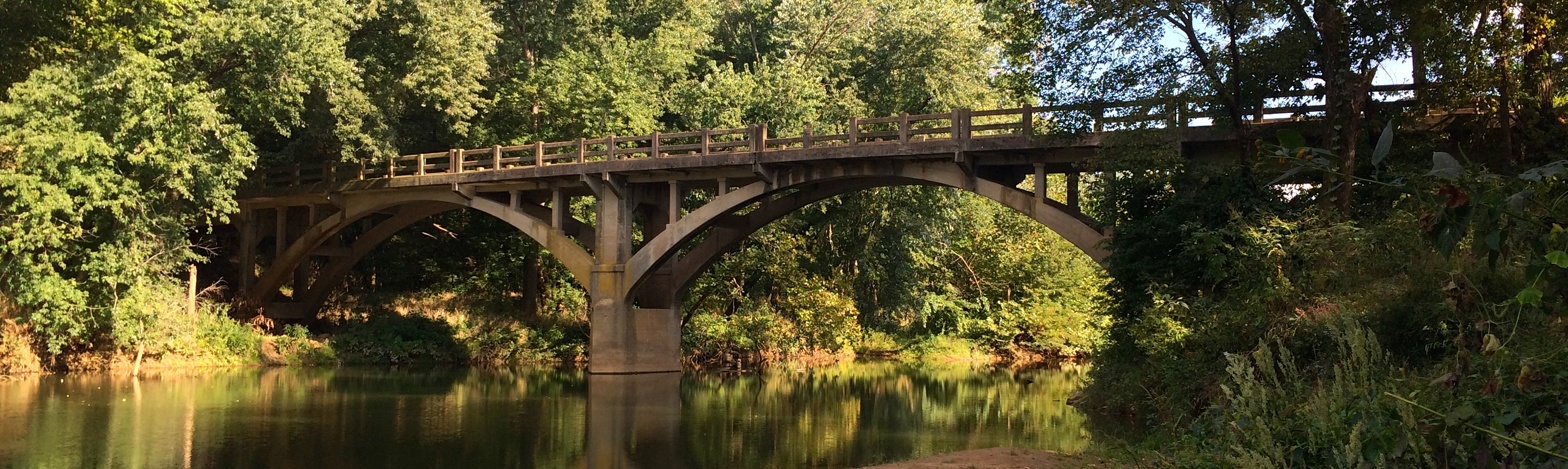

- Location within Arkansas Location within the United States
- Nearest city: Old Alabam, Arkansas
- Coordinates: 36°7′24″N 93°41′39″W
- Area: less than one acre
- Built: 1925
- Built by: Meyer & Greenwald Const. Co.
- Architectural style: Open Spandrel Arch Bridge
- MPS: Historic Bridges of Arkansas MPS
- NRHP reference No.: 07001430
- Added to NRHP: January 24, 2008

The War Eagle Creek Bridge is a historic bridge in northern Madison County, Arkansas. It carries County Road 1650 across War Eagle Creek northeast of Huntsville, and just north of creek crossing of United States Route 412. The bridge is a two-span open-spandrel concrete arch bridge, with a total length of 206 feet (63 m). Each arch spans 70 feet (21 m), and they are mounted on concrete abutments and a central pier. Built in 1925–26, it is the county's only known surviving example of this bridge type.

The bridge was listed on the National Register of Historic Places in 2008.

== See also ==
- National Register of Historic Places listings in Madison County, Arkansas
- List of bridges on the National Register of Historic Places in Arkansas
