= Alabam, Arkansas =

Unincorporated community in Arkansas, US

Coordinates: 36°09′09″N 93°40′53″W

Alabam is an unincorporated community in Madison County, Arkansas, United States. The community is located on Arkansas Highway 127, approximately six miles northeast of Huntsville. The community of Old Alabam is about one mile south at the intersection of Highway 127 and U.S. Route 412. Alabam is on a broad ridge between War Eagle Creek to the southwest and the Kings River to the northeast.
