= Illinois Steel Bridge Company =

The Illinois Steel Bridge Company was an American manufacturer of bridges based in Jacksonville, Illinois. It is credited as builder of a number of bridges and other structures that are listed on the National Register of Historic Places.

Works include (with variations in attribution):

- Duncan Mills Bridge, W of Havanna, Lewistown, Illinois (Illinois Steel Bridge Co.), NRHP-listed
- Third Street Bridge, Waverly, Iowa (Illinois Steel Bridge Co.), NRHP-listed
- State Highway 27 Bridge at the Guadalupe River, US 87, .13 mi. S of jct. with US 183, Cuero, Texas (Illinois Steel Bridge Company), NRHP-listed
- State Highway 71 Bridge at the Colorado River, TX 71, .8 mi E of jct. with FM 609, La Grange, Texas (Illinois Steel Bridge Company, et al.), NRHP-listed
- State Highway 78 Bridge at the Red River, OK 78, across the Red River at the OK-TX state line, Ravenna, Texas and Ravenna, Oklahoma (Illinois Steel Bridge Company, et al.), NRHP-listed
- War Eagle Bridge, carries CR 98 over War Eagle Creek, War Eagle, Arkansas (Illinois Steel Bridge Co.), NRHP-listed
- Matsell Bridge, in Springville, Iowa, carries the Matsell Park Road for 303 feet (92 m) over the Wapsipinicon River
