= 8th Missouri Cavalry Regiment =

- Active: 6 Aug. 1862 – 20 July 1865
- Country: United States
- Allegiance: (United States) Union; Missouri
- Branch: Union Army
- Type: Cavalry
- Size: Regiment
- Part of: Army of the Frontier
- Engagements: American Civil War; Battle of Prairie Grove (1862); Battle of Van Buren (1862); Battle of Brownsville (1863); Battle of Bayou Meto (1863); Battle of Bayou Fourche (1863)

Commanders
- Notable commanders: Washington F. Geiger; Elias Briggs Baldwin

8th Missouri Cavalry Regiment was a cavalry unit from Missouri that served in the Union Army during the American Civil War. The regiment was formed between 6 August and 15 September 1862. The regiment fought at Prairie Grove and Van Buren in 1862. The unit participated in Frederick Steele's expedition to Little Rock in 1863, fighting at Brownsville, Bayou Meto, and Bayou Fourche. From 1863 to 1865, the regiment remained in Arkansas, going on expeditions to suppress Confederate raiders and other occupation duties. The unit was mustered out of service on 20 July 1865. In January 1863, the regiment committed what has become known as the Huntsville Massacre.

== Huntsville massacre ==
After the Battle of Prairie Grove the regiment was ordered to occupy the town of Huntsville, Arkansas. On January 10, 1863, nine southern men who had been detained for some days for reasons unknown were ordered executed by Lieutenant Colonel Elias Briggs Baldwin, for reasons that still today are unclear. Eight of the men would be killed, with the ninth being left as dead, but surviving. At the time of the incident, most of the regiment had moved on toward the Mississippi River with only a small detachment remaining in Huntsville. Baldwin would later be arrested for the murders and transported back to Springfield for trial, but due to witnesses being displaced or otherwise unable to make the trip to Springfield, and the members of the regiment who were present during the event being on active duty elsewhere, Baldwin was released with the charges dropped and dismissed from the army. It would be the only punishment ever carried out in response to the murders.

By the time Baldwin was arrested, the 8th Regiment was on the move in pursuit of Confederate Major General Sterling Price. The regiment would take part in numerous expeditions in and around Arkansas, and took part in the capture of Little Rock in September 1863. They remained in Little Rock until March 1864, when they were sent to Duvall's Bluff, Arkansas. They spent the remainder of the war securing Arkansas, during which time they engaged Confederate forces and Guerrilla bands in several minor skirmishes, but with no major actions.

== Organizations ==
Organized at Springfield, Mo., August 6 to September 15, 1862. Attached to 2nd Brigade, 3rd Division, Army of the Frontier, Dept. of Missouri, to June, 1863. 1st Brigade, 1st Cavalry Division, District of Southeast Missouri, Dept. of Missouri, to August, 1863. 1st Brigade, 1st Cavalry Division, Arkansas Expedition, to December, 1863. 2nd Brigade, 1st Cavalry Division, Army of Arkansas, to January, 1864, and 7th Army Corps, Dept. of Arkansas, to May, 1864. 3rd Brigade, 2nd Division, 7th Army Corps, to September, 1864. 3rd Brigade, Cavalry Division, 7th Army Corps, to February, 1865. 2nd Brigade, Cavalry Division, 7th Army Corps, to March, 1865. 1st Separate Cavalry Brigade, 7th Army Corps, to July, 1865.

== History ==
SERVICE.--Springfield, Mo., August 9, 1862. Blount's Campaign in Missouri and Arkansas October 17-December 27. Battle of Prairie Grove, Ark., December 7. Expedition from Fayetteville to Huntsville December 21–23. Expedition over Boston Mountains to Van Buren December 27–29. Bloomfield, Mo., May 12, 1863. Join Davidson's Division at Pilot Knob, Mo., June, 1863, and march to Clarendon on White River, Ark. Steele's Expedition against Little Rock, Ark., August I-September 10. Grand Prairie August 17. Brownsville August 25. Bayou Metoe or Reed's Bridge August 27. Reconnaissance from Brownsville August 29. Ferry's Landing September 7. Bayou Fourche and capture of Little Rock September 10. Pursuit of Price September 11–14. Near Little Rock September 11. Duty at Little Rock until March, 1864. Duvall's Bluff December 1 and December 12, 1863 (Detachments). Indian Bay February 16, 1864. Clarendon March 15. Fitzhugh's Woods, near Augusta, April 1 (Detachment). Cache River Cotton Plant April 21–22. Operations against Shelby north of the Arkansas River May 13–31. Stony Point May 20. Searcy June 3 (Detachment). Bealer's Ferry, Little Red River, June 6 (Detachment). Expedition from Little Rock to Little Red River August 6–16. Jones' Hay Station and Long Prairie August 24. Expedition in pursuit of Shelby August 27-September 6. Expedition from Lewisburg to Strahan Landing November 26-December 2. Expedition from Brownsville to Augusta January 4–27 (Detachment). Duty in the Dept. of Arkansas until July. Mustered out July 20, 1865.

Regiment lost during service 1 Officer and 26 Enlisted men killed and mortally wounded and 3 Officers and 352 Enlisted men by disease. Total 382.

== See also ==
- List of Missouri Union Civil War units
