= Aurora, Arkansas =

- Unincorporated community
- Location within Arkansas Location within the United States
- Coordinates: 35°59′50″N 93°42′10″W
- Country: United States
- State: Arkansas
- County: Madison
- Elevation: 1,355 ft (413 m)
- Time zone: UTC-6 (Central (CST))
  - Summer (DST): UTC-5 (CDT)
- GNIS feature ID: 57294

Aurora is an unincorporated community in Madison County, Arkansas, United States. It is located south of Huntsville at the junction of AR 127 and AR 23. The community lies on the banks of War Eagle Creek.

The first store at Aurora opened in 1874.
