= Elias Briggs Baldwin =

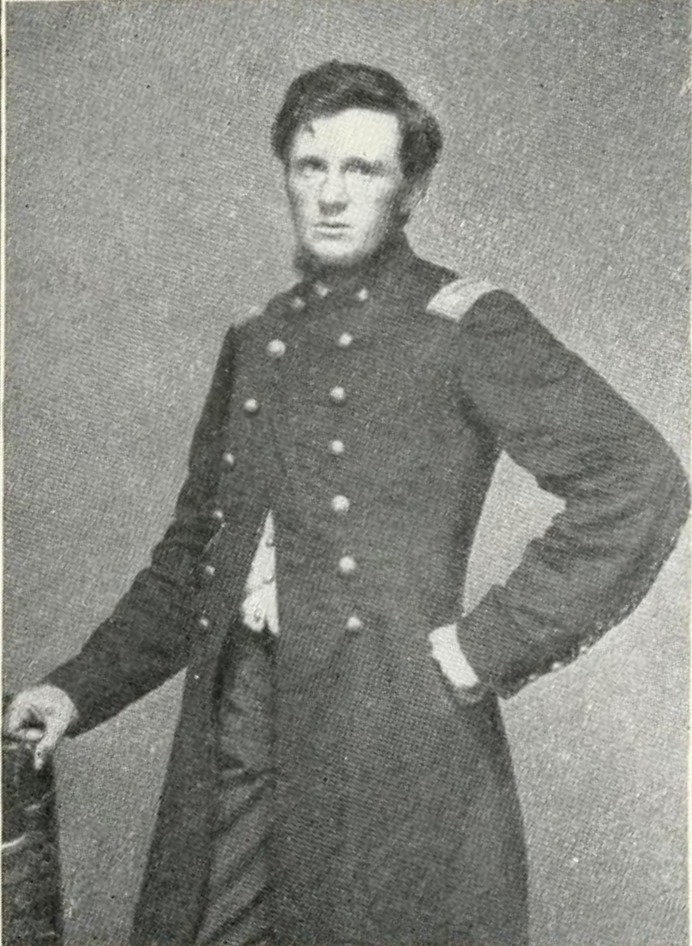
- Baldwin as a Lieutenant Colonel in the 8th Missouri Cavalry Regiment
- Born: June 17, 1834; Dutchess County, New York
- Died: March 26, 1921 (aged 86); Oswego, Kansas
- Military career
- Allegiance: (United States) United States; Union
- Branch: United States Army; Union Army
- Rank: Lieutenant colonel
- Unit: 36th Illinois Infantry Regiment
- Commands: 8th Regiment Missouri Volunteer Cavalry
- Conflicts: American Civil War

Elias Briggs Baldwin (June 17, 1834 – March 26, 1921) was a Union Army lieutenant colonel, later Provost Marshal, and pioneer of Labette County, Kansas. He is best remembered for his part in the Huntsville massacre, which occurred on January 10, 1863, near Huntsville, Arkansas.

== Biography ==
Baldwin was born in Dutchess County, New York, and was raised on the family farm there. He attended high school in Red Creek, New York, and later taught school in both Rhode Island and Connecticut. On April 13, 1861, he joined the Union Army along with his four brothers, one of whom would be killed in action at the Battle of Resaca. He was initially elected as captain for Company C, 36th Regiment, Illinois Volunteer Infantry. The regiment was dispatched to Missouri, and in February 1862, he was made quartermaster. In August, he was promoted to lieutenant colonel over the 8th Regiment Missouri Volunteer Cavalry.

On January 10, 1863, while serving under the command of Union General Francis Herron in Huntsville, Arkansas, Baldwin had nine local men executed for reasons that remain unknown; an event which has become known as the "Huntsville massacre." Baldwin was later arrested for that event and charged with "violation of the 6th Article of War for the murder of prisoners of war." He was transported to Springfield, Missouri and was held for trial. However, many of the witnesses were found to be on active duty and unable to attend the trial, and many local civilian witnesses had been displaced or were otherwise unable to make the trip to Springfield, leading to the charges being dropped. Nevertheless, Baldwin was dismissed from the army. By 1870, he was residing in Labette County, Kansas. He died in Oswego, Kansas on March 26, 1921.
