= Forum, Arkansas =

- Unincorporated community
- Location within Arkansas Location within the United States
- Coordinates: 36°10′54″N 93°42′54″W
- Country: United States
- State: Arkansas
- County: Madison
- Elevation: 1,377 ft (420 m)
- Time zone: UTC-6 (Central (CST))
  - Summer (DST): UTC-5 (CDT)
- GNIS feature ID: 57765

Forum is an unincorporated community in Madison County, Arkansas, United States. It is located at the intersection of Arkansas highways 23, 23W and 127 near Withrow Springs State Park.
