= Old Alabam, Arkansas =

- Unincorporated community
- Location within Arkansas Location within the United States
- Coordinates: 36°08′04″N 93°40′47″W
- Country: United States
- State: Arkansas
- County: Madison
- Elevation: 1,368 ft (417 m)
- Time zone: UTC-6 (Central (CST))
  - Summer (DST): UTC-5 (CDT)
- GNIS feature ID: 52982

Old Alabam is an unincorporated community in Madison County, Arkansas, United States. It is located on AR 127 near U.S. Route 412. The community is about 4.5 miles northeast of Huntsville and one mile south of the community of Alabam.
