= Third Street Bridge (Waverly, Iowa) =

- Third Street Bridge (FHWA No. 012250)
- U.S. National Register of Historic Places
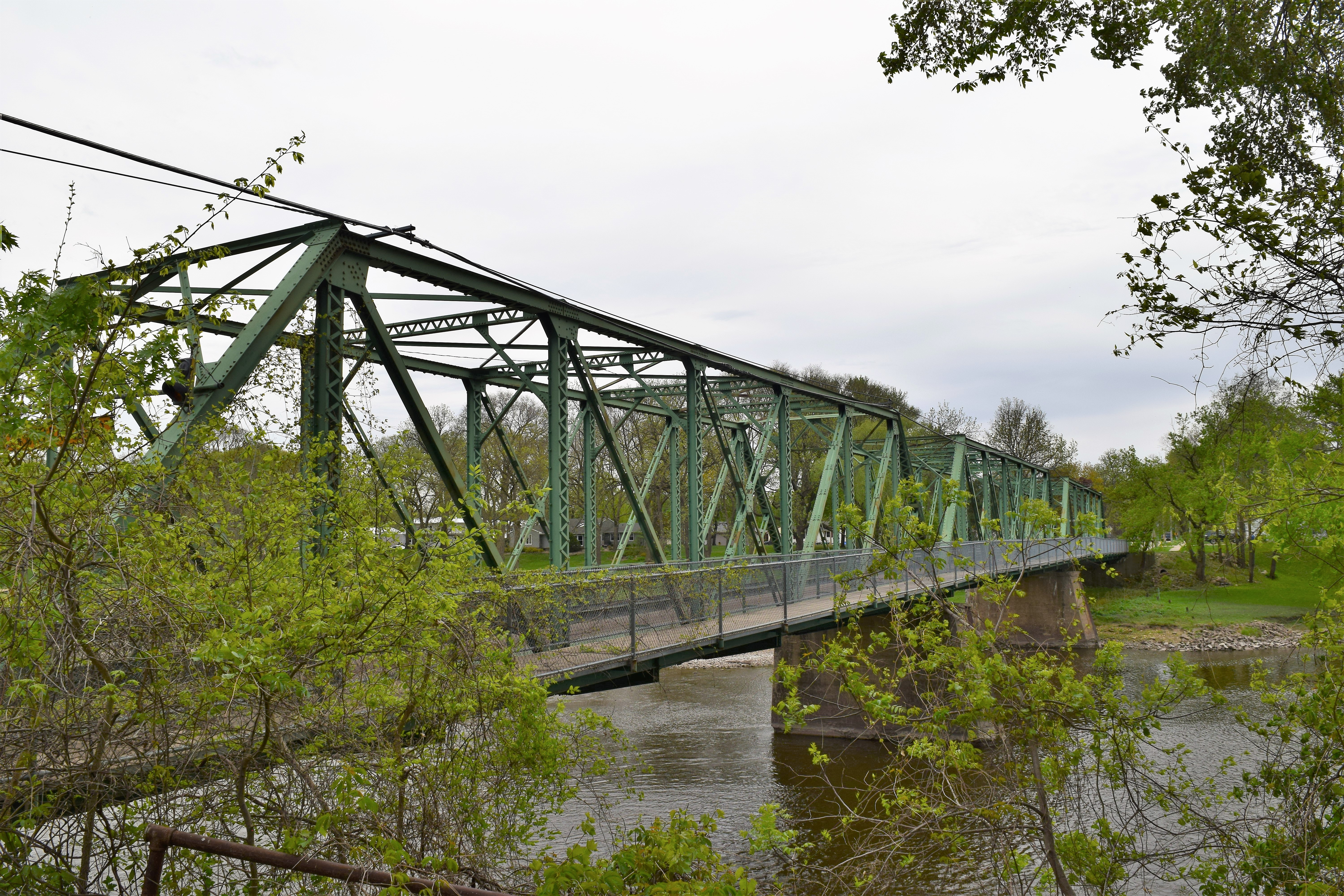

- Location within Iowa Location within the United States
- Location: 3rd St SE over the Cedar River between 5th & 6th Aves SE, Waverly, Iowa
- Coordinates: 42°43′14.9″N 92°28′00.8″W
- Built: 1917
- Built by: Illinois Steel Bridge Company
- Architect: Iowa State Highway Commission
- Architectural style: Riveted Pratt through truss
- NRHP reference No.: 100002485
- Added to NRHP: May 31, 2018

The Third Street Bridge, also known as the Brookwood Park Bridge and the Harmon Street Bridge, was a historic structure located in Waverly, Iowa, United States. It spans the Cedar River for 363 feet (111 m). This Riveted Pratt through truss was designed by the Iowa State Highway Commission and constructed by the Illinois Steel Bridge Company of Jacksonville, Illinois in 1917. It is composed of three spans. The truss' were painted green in 1962, and the bridge received major renovations in 1983. It was closed to traffic in February 2015 "after a certified inspector examining the bridge Friday for an annual inspection found the trusses connecting bearings, sidewalk support brackets, and two stringers in the south bridge span have severely corroded." It was listed on the National Register of Historic Places in 2018. The Third Street Bridge is one of three bridges installed by the Illinois Steel Bridge Company that is still standing in Iowa.
