= Huntsville massacre =

- Part of the American Civil War
- Location: 36.08761124°N 93.73662152°W; Huntsville, Arkansas
- Date: January 10, 1863
- Target: Confederate soldiers/sympathizers
- Attack type: Extrajudicial executions, mass murder, state terrorism
- Weapon: Firearms
- Deaths: 8
- Injuries: 1
- Perpetrators: (United States) Company G, 8th Regiment Missouri Volunteer Cavalry: Elias Briggs Baldwin

The Huntsville massacre was the Civil War killing of eight men (a ninth survived), including three Confederate officers, by Union soldiers on January 10, 1863, outside Huntsville, Arkansas. The commanding officer resigned and faced charges, but they were dropped after witnesses for a trial could not be produced. A few months before, Confederates had ambushed 25 Union troops escorting prominent local politician Isaac Murphy's daughters back home, killing most. Murphy's daughters were also robbed repeatedly and constantly harassed.

The event was nearly lost until a historian wrote about it in a historical quarterly in 1974. More research has been published on this topic, and a memorial to the victims was erected in 2006.

== Background ==
In 1862, after the Battle of Pea Ridge in Arkansas, Isaac Murphy of Huntsville received death threats and was forced to flee his home. He had represented Madison County in the Arkansas House of Representatives and was the body's lone voted against secession before the war, having been elected with 85% support on a Unionist platform. He was with the Army in Missouri. By the fall of 1862, his daughters wished to visit him in Pea Ridge, Arkansas, where Murphy had taken a civilian position on General Curtis's staff. The Union Army escorted them back home to Huntsville.

Two miles from town, the escort of 25 soldiers sent the daughters to town ahead with a driver and set up camp to rest. 300 Confederate troops confronted the daughters, demanding to know the size of their escort; the girls refused but relented after the Confederates threatened to kill the driver, though only stole the girls' money. The Confederates, greatly outnumbering the escort, attacked the Union soldiers; eighteen men were killed, but seven survived the ambush.

After the Battle of Prairie Grove, Union General Francis Herron was ordered to take his 5,000 troops northeast to the Mississippi River, where he would connect with the army under the command of General Ulysses S. Grant in the push for Vicksburg. While Herron's troops passed through Huntsville, they were told that Murphy's daughters were being constantly harassed by locals and had their money and personal property stolen by Confederates. Murphy's daughters were not the only ones, as Confederates targeted Unionist families near Huntsville, “stripp[ing them] of everything but what was on their bodies, leaving them destitute.” Within days Union soldiers had arrested several men, but no official charges were filed.

== Executions ==
In the early morning hours of January 10, 1863, nine men who had been arrested were taken from where they were being detained by members of Company G, 8th Regiment Missouri Volunteer Cavalry, under the command of Lieutenant Colonel Elias Briggs Baldwin. The men were Chesley Hood Boatright, William Martin Berry, Hugh Samuel Berry, John William Moody, Askin Hughes, John Hughes, Watson P. Stevens, Robert Coleman Young, and Bill Parks. Hugh Samuel Berry and Askin Hughes were captains in the Confederate Army and home on leave. John William Moody was a Confederate officer with the Fourth Regiment, Arkansas Cavalry, and a former US Marshal. William Berry was father to Hugh and brother to James R. Berry, who was son-in-law to Isaac Murphy. All were shot, but at least two survived. Hugh Berry was "of right mind" and identified the perpetrators; he died three days later. Bill Parks was left for dead but survived the shooting and later moved to Mississippi.

The reason for the executions is unknown: whether for perjured Oaths of Allegiance to the Union, or in retaliation for the Confederate ambush of the Union escort, or for Isaac Murphy's daughters being harassed, or from another unknown cause, no documentation has been discovered.

Hugh Berry, who had survived several days, was asked what happened and who did it. He responded, "Men of the 8th Missouri Regiment. But Johnson, Ham and Murphy had it done." He was referring to the attorneys Isaac Murphy, E.D. Ham, and Union Colonel James M. Johnson. Although Baldwin had ordered his forces to shoot the prisoners, Berry did not mention him.

Word of the executions spread quickly. Baldwin was arrested and charged by the Union Army with "violation of the 6th Article of War for the murder of prisoners of war." He was transported to Springfield, Missouri and held for a court martial. As many witnesses were on active military duty and unable to attend the trial, and several civilian witnesses were displaced or unable to travel to Springfield, the U.S. Army dropped the charges and discharged Baldwin.

== Aftermath ==
Two local colleges closed that had been affiliated with the Masons. The local Masonic chapter believed that Isaac Murphy had something to do with the executions, and several of those executed were members of the Masons.

Murphy's daughters and wife had operated the Plain View Female Seminary, and Murphy headed Huntsville Institute. The Masons chapter ended the financial support of both schools, forcing them to close.

Murphy continued his political career; he was elected governor in 1863 and stayed in office during the first years of Reconstruction in Arkansas and died in 1882. Colonel James Johnson was elected U.S. Representative from Arkansas, though never served as Congress would not seat representatives from Arkansas, and later Lieutenant Governor and Secretary of State of the state and died 1913. E. D. Ham won election as a District Attorney and Circuit Judge and died in 1905. Short of Baldwin's arrest and dismissal from the army on less-than-honorable circumstances, no one was punished for the deaths of the Confederates. (Baldwin died 1921)

For decades afterward, locals in the area commemorated the event by annually decorating the site with flowers, but few spoke publicly about it. In 1974, the historian John I. Smith published several articles about the murders in the Northwest Arkansas Times since he had uncovered accounts of the massacre while researching a biography on Isaac Murphy. On September 30, 2006, a monument commemorating the event was dedicated at the execution site.

== Additional sources ==
- Joy Russell and Kevin Hatfield, "The Huntsville Massacre—The Civil War Forever Changes a Community." Madison County Musings 25 (Winter 2006): 174–192.
- Joy Russell and Dr. Kevin Hatfield, "The Huntsville Massacre-—The Civil War Forever Changes a Community." (2006), Huntsville Lodge No. 364. pdf
- The Huntsville Massacre. Huntsville, AR : Madison County Genealogical and Historical Society, 2007.
- Smith, John "The Huntsville Massacre." Carroll County Historical Quarterly 19 (Summer–Fall 1974): 10–12.
