= Arkansas Highway 116 =

State highway in Arkansas, United States

Highway 116

Route information
- Maintained by ArDOT

Section 1
- Length: 3.40 mi (5.47 km)
- West end: AR 23 near Booneville
- East end: AR 10 near Booneville

Section 2
- Length: 1.02 mi (1.64 km)
- West end: AR 23 near Booneville
- East end: Booneville Human Development Center near Booneville

Location
- Country: United States
- State: Arkansas
- Counties: Logan

Highway system
- Arkansas Highway System; Interstate; US; State; Business; Spurs; Suffixed; Scenic; Heritage
← AR 115	→ AR 117

Highway 116 (AR 116, Ark. 116, and Hwy. 116) is a designation for two east–west state highways in Logan County. A northern route of 3.40 miles (5.47 km) runs east from Highway 23 encircling the northeastern quadrant of Booneville and ending at Highway 10. A second route of 1.02 miles (1.64 km) begins at Highway 23 and runs east to the Booneville Human Development Center.

== Route description ==
=== Booneville ===
Highway 116 begins at Highway 23 north of Booneville near Lake Booneville. The route runs east before turning south and terminating at Highway 10. The average daily traffic counts from the Arkansas State Highway and Transportation Department (AHTD) for 2010 show that about 600 vehicles per day (VPD) use Highway 116.

=== Booneville Human Development Center ===
Highway 116 begins at Highway 23 south of Booneville. The route winds southeast to the former Arkansas Tuberculosis Sanatorium Historic District, which was listed on the National Register of Historic Places in 2006. Today the property is the Booneville Human Development Center managed by the Arkansas Department of Human Services. Traffic counts from the AHTD in 2010 indicate that the average daily traffic volume on this segment of Highway 116 is 1128 vehicles per day.

== Major intersections ==
The entire route is in Logan County.

Location	mi	km	Destinations	Notes
	0.00	0.00	AR 23	Western terminus
	3.40	5.47	AR 10	Eastern terminus
Highway 116 begins south of Booneville
	0.00	0.00	AR 23	Western terminus
	1.02	1.64	Booneville Human Development Center	Eastern terminus
1.000 mi = 1.609 km; 1.000 km = 0.621 mi
