= Arky Vaughan =

American baseball player (1912–1952)

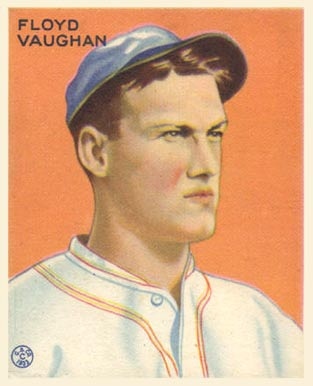
- Vaughan in 1933
- Shortstop
- Born: March 9, 1912; Clifty, Arkansas, U.S.
- Died: August 30, 1952 (aged 40); Eagleville, California, U.S.
- Batted: Left Threw: Right

MLB debut
- April 17, 1932, for the Pittsburgh Pirates

Last MLB appearance
- September 22, 1948, for the Brooklyn Dodgers

MLB statistics
- Batting average: .318
- Hits: 2,103
- Home runs: 96
- Runs batted in: 926
- Stats at Baseball Reference

Teams
- Pittsburgh Pirates (1932–1941); Brooklyn Dodgers (1942–1943, 1947–1948)

Career highlights and awards
- 9× All-Star (1934–1942); NL batting champion (1935); NL stolen base leader (1943); Pittsburgh Pirates Hall of Fame

Member of the National

Baseball Hall of Fame
- Induction: 1985
- Election method: Veterans Committee

Joseph Floyd "Arky" Vaughan (March 9, 1912 – August 30, 1952) was an American professional baseball player. He played 14 seasons in Major League Baseball, between 1932 and 1948, for the Pittsburgh Pirates and Brooklyn Dodgers, primarily as a shortstop. He was elected to the National Baseball Hall of Fame in 1985.

== Minor leagues ==
Born in Clifty, Arkansas, Vaughan got his nickname early in life, despite leaving Arkansas before his first birthday. He grew up in Fullerton, California.

Vaughan made his professional debut in 1931 at age 19 for the minor league Wichita Aviators of the Western League, where he hit .338 with 21 home runs. When the Aviators became affiliated with the Chicago Cubs after the season, Vaughan was acquired by the Tulsa Oilers, who were affiliated with the Pittsburgh Pirates. On April 7, 1932, Vaughan was acquired from the Oilers by the Pirates.

== Major league career ==
=== Pittsburgh Pirates ===
==== Rookie year ====
Vaughan began the 1932 season as the backup to the Pirates' starting shortstop, Tommy Thevenow. Through the first 13 games of the season, Vaughan appeared only twice, once as a late-game replacement for Thevenow and once as a pinch-hitter. However, Thevenow was still suffering the effects of a season-ending ankle injury he had suffered in 1931, which opened up the door for Vaughan to take over the job. When Thevenow returned at the end of May after missing a month, he found himself in a reserve role.

Vaughan, who was the youngest player in the National League in 1932, wound up playing 129 games overall that year, all but one at shortstop. He finished with a .318 batting average and 61 runs batted in (RBIs) in his rookie season. His defense was a bit shaky, though, as he led the league in errors with 46. His year was impressive enough to garner a modicum of support for Most Valuable Player, finishing 23rd in the voting.

==== Establishing himself ====
Vaughan solidified his position as the Pirates' starting shortstop in 1933. Improving on almost all of his offensive statistics, Vaughan played in 152 games, batting .314 with 97 RBI, seventh- and fifth-best in the NL respectively. He also led the league with 19 triples. He finished in the league top five in on-base percentage (.388, 3rd), slugging percentage (.478, 5th) and walks (64, 4th). Although he led the league in errors again with an identical 46 to the previous year, due to his increased playing time his fielding percentage improved a bit from .934 to .945. For the second straight year, he finished 23rd in the MVP voting.

Vaughan took his game up another notch in 1934. While finishing fourth in the race for the batting title at .333, he led the league in OBP at .431, helped by his league-leading walk total of 94. Although he dropped from fifth to sixth in slugging, the raw number improved to .511. His performance earned him a spot on the NL All-Star team, the first of what would be nine straight selections. His defense continued to improve as well, as his error total dropped to 41, no longer the most in the league, and his fielding percentage rose again to .951. For the third straight year, he finished 23rd in the MVP voting.

==== 1935 ====
In 1935, Vaughan had what is universally recognized as his best season. Vaughan not only posted career bests in the three Triple Crown categories, he led all of baseball with a .385 average, a .491 on-base percentage, and a 1.098 OPS. His 190 Adjusted OPS as of 2011 still ranks as one of the top 100 single-season scores of all time. His .607 slugging percentage led the NL, as did his 97 walks. His 19 home runs were eighth in the league, his only time in the top ten, and his 99 RBI were sixth. He also earned the first of his six starts in the All-Star Game. Defensively, he finished in the top half of the league in fielding percentage for the first time while finishing second in both putouts and assists.

Although he was third in National League MVP voting behind Gabby Hartnett and Dizzy Dean, he was named Player of the Year by The Sporting News. The season has been called the best ever by a shortstop other than Honus Wagner.

==== Remaining Pirates career ====
Over the next six seasons, Vaughan continued to be one of the best-hitting shortstops in the game, batting over .300 in every season, and regularly being at or near the top of the league in most offensive categories. By the time Vaughan reached the age of 25, he had accumulated 1,057 hits, the 18th highest total for a 25-year-old in MLB history. He also continued to improve defensively, as he led the league in total chances in 1938–39 while finishing in the top three in fielding percentage four times. He again finished third in the MVP voting in 1938, when the Pirates finished second and had their best record during his tenure with the team.

In 1940, Vaughan was appointed team captain by new manager Frankie Frisch. Although he led the league in runs scored and triples again, he slumped to a career-low .300 batting average. This prompted Frisch to replace Vaughan as starting shortstop with Alf Anderson to start the 1941 season. However, Anderson didn't hit, and Vaughan was quickly back in the starting lineup. In the 1941 All-Star Game, Vaughan hit two home runs, but was upstaged by a ninth-inning, three-run homer by American Leaguer Ted Williams. Vaughan finished the year batting .316 in 106 games. That would be his last year with the Pirates who wouldn't see a star as bright as Vaughan for almost two decades. The fans were outraged at his trade to Brooklyn and his mysterious death years later helped coin the phrase "The Ghost of Arky" when times got tough.

=== Brooklyn Dodgers ===
==== A new position ====
On December 12, 1941, after a decade as the Pirates' starting shortstop, Vaughan was traded to the Brooklyn Dodgers for Pete Coscarart, Luke Hamlin, Babe Phelps, and Jimmy Wasdell. It is believed that this trade was in part prompted due to bad feelings between Vaughan and Frisch. Since Pee Wee Reese was already at shortstop for the Dodgers, the plan was to move Vaughan to third base.

Vaughan's tenure with the Dodgers got off to a rough start, as he failed to hit .300 for the first time in his career, finishing at .277 with just two home runs. He also established new lows in several other categories, including a career-worst .348 OBP. He still managed to make the All-Star team as the starter at third base, and actually finished third in the league in fielding percentage, but the season was a disappointment overall.

==== Clash of personalities ====
With Reese drafted into World War II, Vaughan was moved back to shortstop in 1943. He rebounded on offense, raising his average over .300 once again at .305 and leading the league in runs scored and, for the first and only time, stolen bases with 20.

However, the season was marred by an incident that would nearly lead to the end of Vaughan's career. On July 10, temperamental manager Leo Durocher suspended pitcher Bobo Newsom for insubordination after Newsom complained about catcher Bobby Bragan dropping a third strike. Durocher subsequently fed false claims to the press that Newsom had thrown an illegal spitball after being instructed not to. According to teammate Billy Herman, after reading Durocher's comments about Newsom, Vaughan went into the manager's office, took off his uniform, and "threw it in Durocher's face". After the season, Vaughan left the team, retiring to his ranch. He went on to sit out the next three years.

==== Comeback ====
After Durocher was suspended before the 1947 season, Vaughan decided to try a comeback. Serving as something of a utility player, Vaughan played in 64 games and batted .325. He played in his only World Series that season, which the Dodgers lost to the New York Yankees. Vaughan appeared in three games in the 1947 World Series, all as a pinch hitter, reaching base twice on a walk and a double.

Even with Durocher's suspension over, Vaughan returned to the Dodgers in a similar capacity in 1948. However, after batting a career-low .244 in 65 games, he was released at the end of the season. He played the 1949 season with Pacific Coast League's San Francisco Seals before retiring for good.

=== Legacy ===
Vaughan retired with 1,173 runs scored, 96 home runs, 926 RBI, 118 steals, a .318 batting average, .406 on-base percentage and .453 slugging percentage. As of 2019, his .385 batting average, .491 OBP, and 1.098 OPS in 1935 are all Pittsburgh team records, and the batting average is a 20th-century record for National League shortstops. Vaughan is the 26th greatest non-pitcher in major league history, according to win shares. He hit for the cycle twice in his career as a member of the Pirates. In 14 seasons, he hit .300 or better 12 times, only missing the mark in 1942 and 1948.

Vaughan was inducted into the National Baseball Hall of Fame in 1985, following which Vaughan's daughter Patricia received this brief, handwritten congratulatory letter:

I was a substitute tackle on the Fullerton High School championship 130-pound team and remember Arky as our star halfback – fast, hard-nosed and even then a real professional.

Sincerely,
Richard Nixon

As early as July 1972, Nixon, then the President of the United States, had named Vaughan the starting shortstop on his "All-Time" National League All-Star Team's pre-war (1925–1945) component, citing as his "sentimental reason" their high school connection while stating his belief that "most experts would include Arky on a team if he were rated on hitting ability alone". In 1981, Lawrence Ritter and Donald Honig included Vaughan in their book The 100 Greatest Baseball Players of All Time. In his New Historical Baseball Abstract, published in 2001, Bill James rated Vaughan as the second-best shortstop in major league history, behind fellow Pirate and mentor Honus Wagner. In his 2021 book, The Baseball 100, Joe Posnanski places Vaughan at number 61 on a list of the 100 all-time greatest baseball players. Posnanski called Vaughan "the least-known great Major League Baseball player," stating: "He was so quiet and modest. He was not colorful in the ways that entertain sportswriters. He was simply a great baseball player with strong values."

== Personal life ==
Vaughan married his wife, Margaret, in 1931, and they had four children.

After leaving the Seals, Vaughan bought a ranch in Eagleville, California, where he retired to fish, hunt, and tend cattle. On August 30, 1952, Vaughan was fishing in nearby Lost Lake, with his friend Bill Wimer. According to a witness, Wimer stood up in the boat, causing it to capsize, and both men drowned. In Joe Posnanski's characterization of the incident, an eyewitness saw Vaughan swim back to assist his companion. Their bodies were recovered the next day. Vaughan was 40.

Vaughan's nephew Glenn Vaughan had a brief major league career with the Houston Colt .45s in 1963.

== See also ==
- List of Major League Baseball career hits leaders
- List of Major League Baseball career runs scored leaders
- List of Major League Baseball career triples leaders
- List of Major League Baseball batting champions
- List of Major League Baseball annual runs scored leaders
- List of Major League Baseball annual stolen base leaders
- List of Major League Baseball annual triples leaders
- List of Major League Baseball players to hit for the cycle

Achievements
Preceded by Chuck Klein; Charlie Gehringer	Hitting for the cycle June 24, 1933; July 19, 1939	Succeeded by Mickey Cochrane; Harry Craft
