= Brashears, Arkansas =

- Unincorporated community
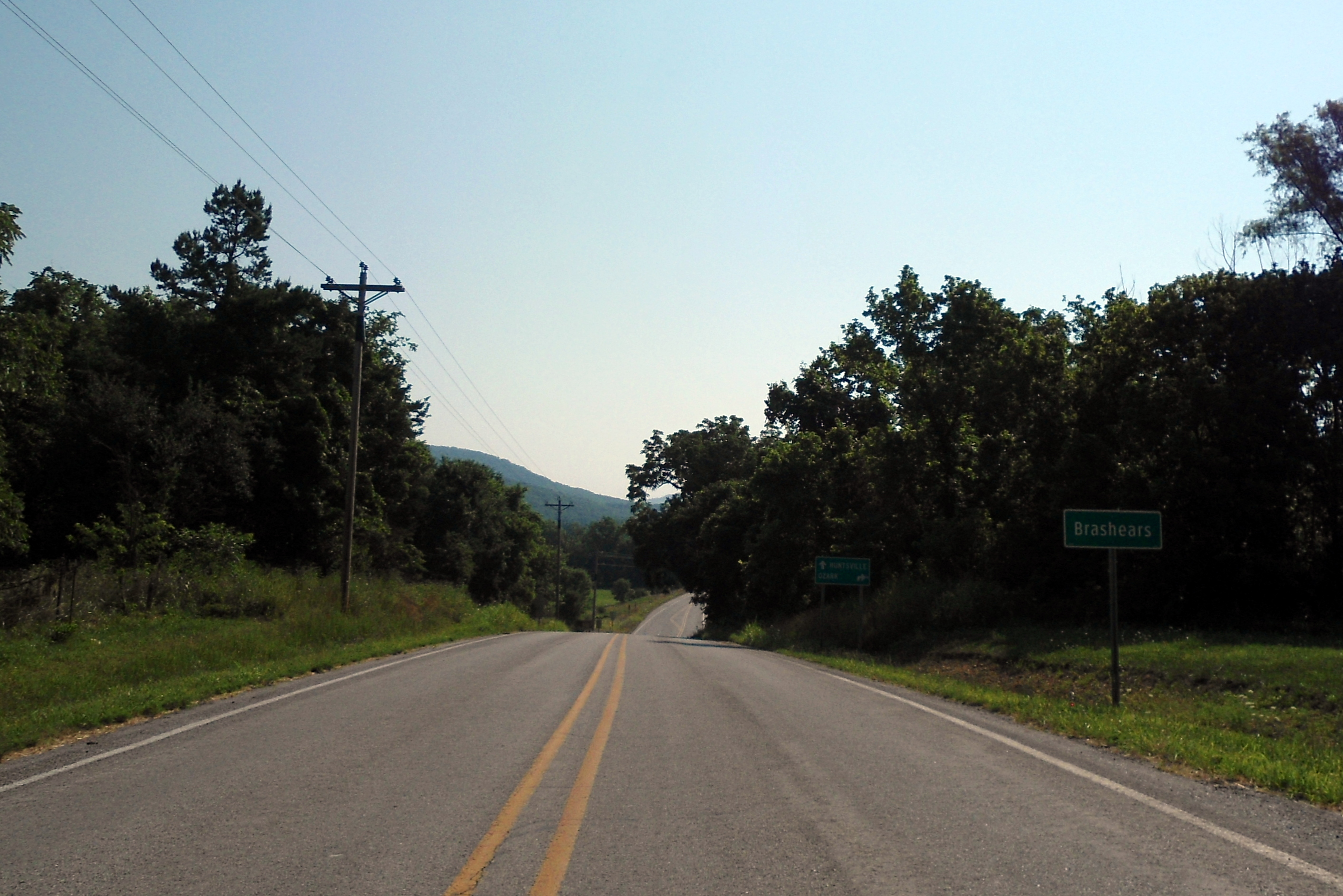
- Entrance to Brashears on Highway 16

- Location within Arkansas Location within the United States
- Coordinates: 35°48′42″N 93°47′45″W
- Country: United States
- State: Arkansas
- County: Madison
- Elevation: 1,483 ft (452 m)
- Time zone: UTC-6 (Central (CST))
  - Summer (DST): UTC-5 (CDT)
- GNIS feature ID: 66390

Brashears (also known as Brashears Junction) is an unincorporated community in Madison County, Arkansas, United States. It is located at the junction of AR 16 and AR 23. The community is within the Ozark-St. Francis National Forest and just south of the upper White River. The community of Combs is about two miles west on route 16 and St. Paul is about two miles east.
