= War Eagle Mill =

Historic replica building in Arkansas

Coordinates: 36°16′1.9″N 93°56′35.2″W

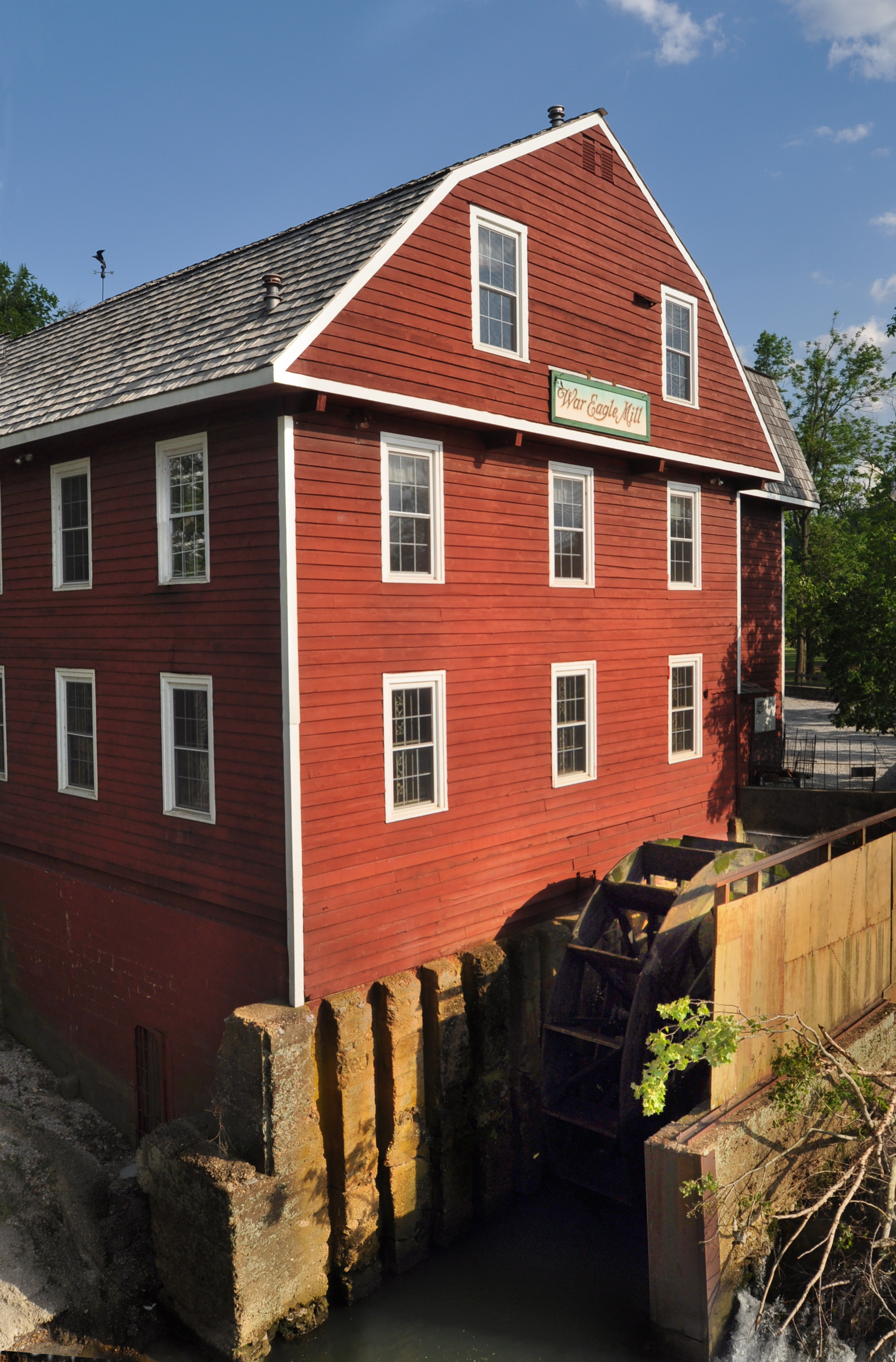
War Eagle Mill as reconstructed in 1973.

War Eagle Mill is a working gristmill in Benton County, Arkansas. A mill has been located on the site as early as 1832, but was destroyed three times, and last rebuilt in 1973. The mill currently operates as an undershot gristmill, and houses a store and restaurant. The mill is located approximately 10 miles (16 kilometers) east of the city of Rogers in War Eagle, Arkansas.

== Historic mills at the site ==
=== First mill ===
Sylvanus and Cathryn Blackburn moved to the War Eagle Valley in 1832 and built a mill next to War Eagle Creek. In 1848 a flood pushed the mill into the river, washing it downstream and completely destroying it.

=== Second mill ===
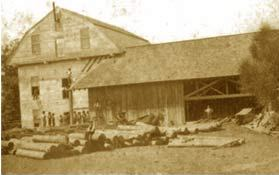
1860 photo of the second mill, with sawmill addition

The Blackburns rebuilt the mill and expanded it to include a sawmill. Business prospered as the local population increased. After 1860, with the Civil War, northwest Arkansas residents were caught between strongly Confederate Arkansans to the south and Union-supporting Missourians just a few miles north. The Blackburns' five sons enlisted in the Confederate Army, while the Blackburns took the rest of their family to Texas, returning four years later.

In 1862, the Union Army moved into northern Arkansas and the War Eagle Valley, and used the mill to grind grain. As the Confederate Army advanced into the area, the Union Army concentrated near Pea Ridge, Arkansas. Confederate soldiers used the mill for two days, but burned it down to prevent it from being used again by the Union. After the Battle of Pea Ridge, the surrounding country was laid waste by the retreating Confederates and bands of looters. Many residents abandoned their homesteads and fled.

=== Third mill ===
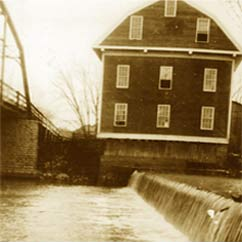
The third mill, which existed from 1873 to 1924, seen here in 1920.

After the war ended in 1865, the Blackburn family returned to find only their house still standing. Sylvanus' son, James Austin Cameron (J.A.C.) Blackburn, reconstructed the mill again by 1873. J.A.C. decided to expand mill production by adding a more powerful grinding machine run by a turbine engine instead of a water wheel. Their sawmill, reportedly the largest in Arkansas, led J.A.C. to become known as the "Lumber King" of northwest Arkansas. Lumber cut at the War Eagle sawmill was used to build much of Fayetteville, Arkansas—including Old Main on the University of Arkansas campus. After winning a seat in the Arkansas Senate, J.A.C. sold the mill to the Kilgore family who operated it until 1924 when the mill burned down. This fire left only the foundation and remnants of the building.

== Present mill ==
In 1973, Jewel Medlin purchased the property. His wife Leta and daughter Zoe Medlin Caywood found blueprints and rebuilt the mill for the third time. The design was modified slightly to bring back the undershot water wheel that had been used over 100 years earlier. War Eagle Mill is the only working watermill in Arkansas, and is powered by an 18-foot cypress water wheel. Organic grain, cereal and flour products are milled and sold commercially on site.

== See also ==
- War Eagle Bridge
- List of historic gristmills
