= Elm Park, Arkansas =

- Unincorporated community
- Elm Park's position in Arkansas. Elm Park, Arkansas (the United States)
- Coordinates: 35°1′17″N 94°7′9″W
- Country: United States
- State: Arkansas
- County: Scott
- Township: Tomlinson
- Elevation: 554 ft (169 m)
- Time zone: UTC-6 (Central (CST))
  - Summer (DST): UTC-5 (CDT)
- Area code: 870
- GNIS feature ID: 71557

Elm Park is an unincorporated community in Tomlinson Township, Scott County, Arkansas, United States. It is located on U.S. Highway 71, with Arkansas Highway 23 running north and Arkansas Highway 378 running west from the community.

== History ==
The first permanent settlement at Elm Park was made in the 1840s.
