= War Eagle Bridge =

- U.S. National Register of Historic Places
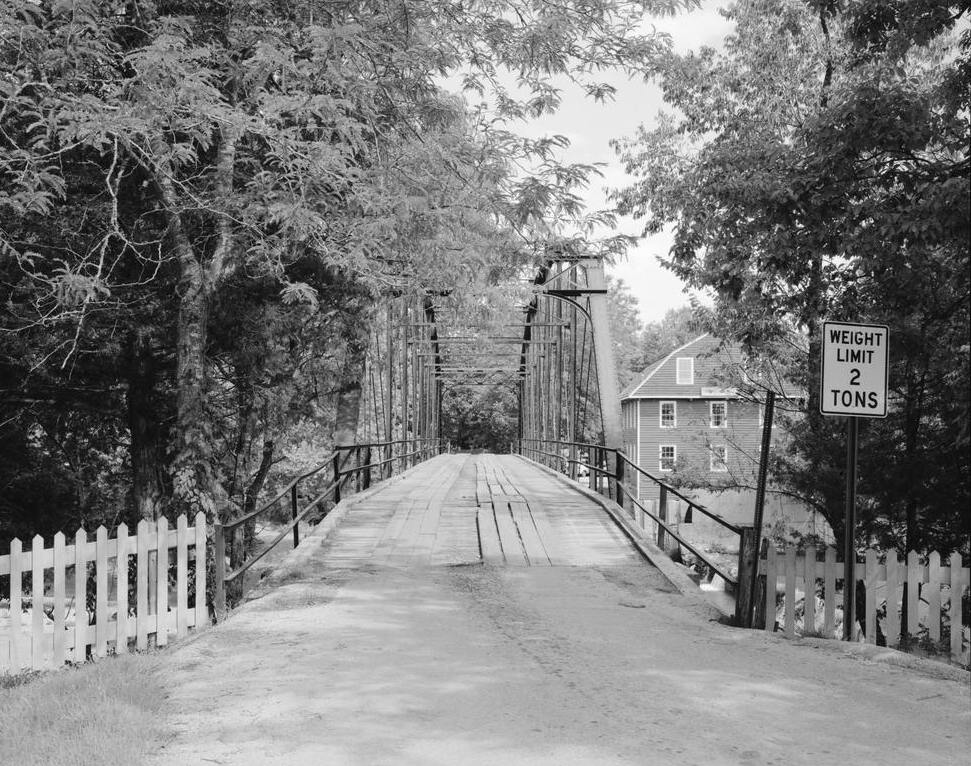
- War Eagle Bridge and mill, 1988

- Location within Arkansas Location within the United States
- Location: War Eagle, Arkansas, 11045 War Eagle Mill Road (CR 98) off AR 12
- Coordinates: 36°16′3″N 93°56′36″W
- Area: less than one acre
- Built: 1907
- Built by: Illinois Steel Bridge Co.
- Architectural style: Parker through truss
- NRHP reference No.: 85003497
- Added to NRHP: November 19, 1985

The War Eagle Bridge is a historic bridge in War Eagle, Arkansas, United States, that is listed on the National Register of Historic Places.

== Description ==
The one-lane steel truss bridge is located on War Eagle Road (County Road 98), passing over the War Eagle Creek. It was built in 1907 and adjoins the War Eagle Mill.

The construction plans and drawings, contract, and correspondence are available at the Benton County Courthouse.

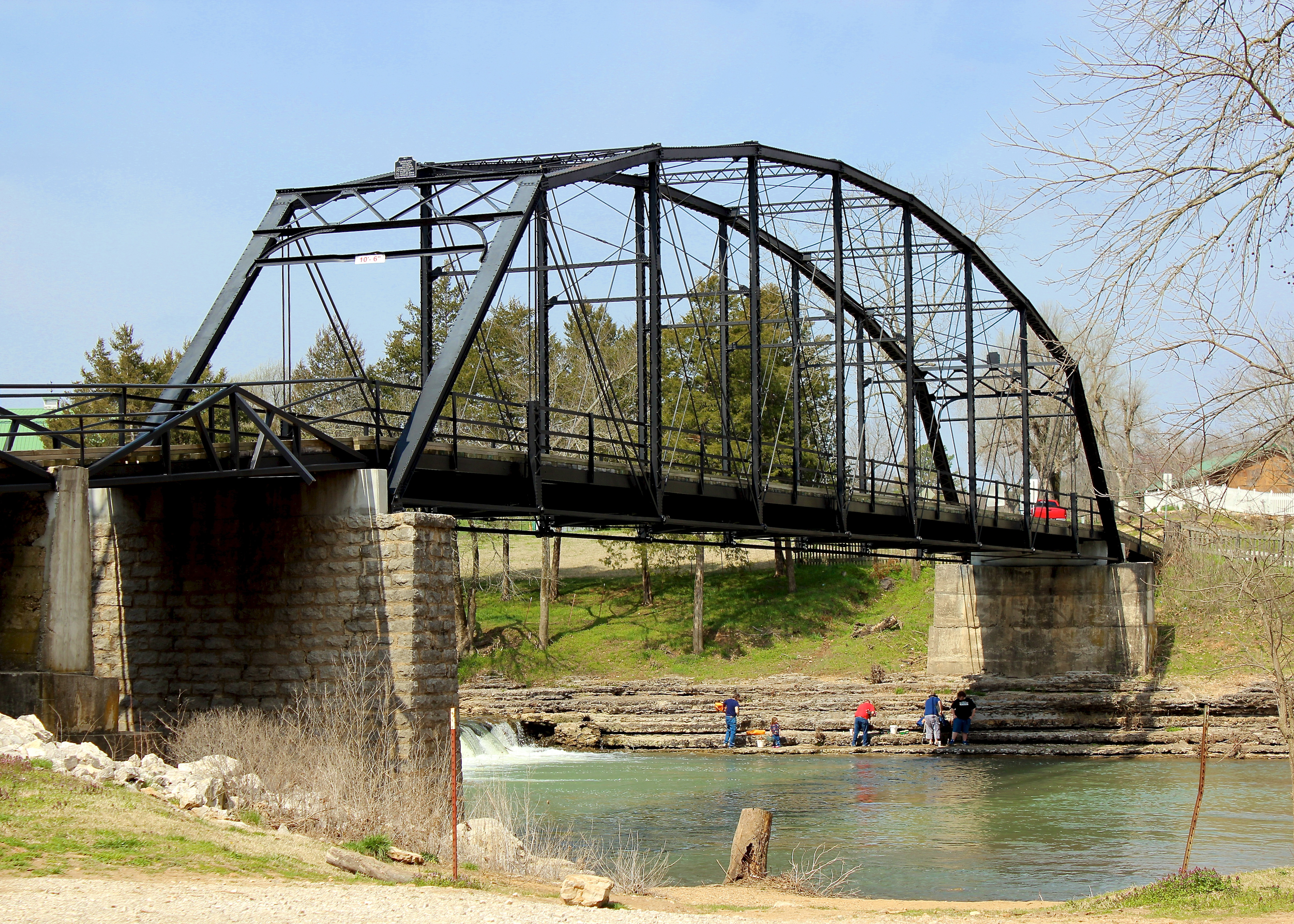
The War Eagle Bridge, April 2013

== History ==
The bridge occupies the site of a ford that has been used since the 1830s. Sylvanus Blackburn built a two-story log house near the west side and a mill on the east side of the ford in 1832. By the early twentieth century the mill was producing 40 barrels of flour per day, creating a need for better access to local markets.

The bridge was constructed in 1907 by the Illinois Steel Bridge Company of Jacksonville, Illinois, for a contracted amount of $4,790 (equivalent to $1,654,771 in 2025). It is the only Parker truss bridge in northwest Arkansas, and one of only seventeen steel truss bridges in the state. It has a span of 182 feet (55 m), and an approach of 40 feet (12 m) on the east side of the bridge. The stone range work pier and abutment on the eastern end and wooden planking for the bridge flooring were provided locally. The stone pier and abutment were replaced with a concrete structure in 1982.

The bridge was listed on the National Register of Historic Places on November 19, 1985.

== See also ==
- List of bridges documented by the Historic American Engineering Record in Arkansas
- List of bridges on the National Register of Historic Places in Arkansas
- National Register of Historic Places listings in Benton County, Arkansas
