= War Eagle, Arkansas =

War Eagle, Arkansas Wareagle, War Eagle Mills
- Unincorporated community
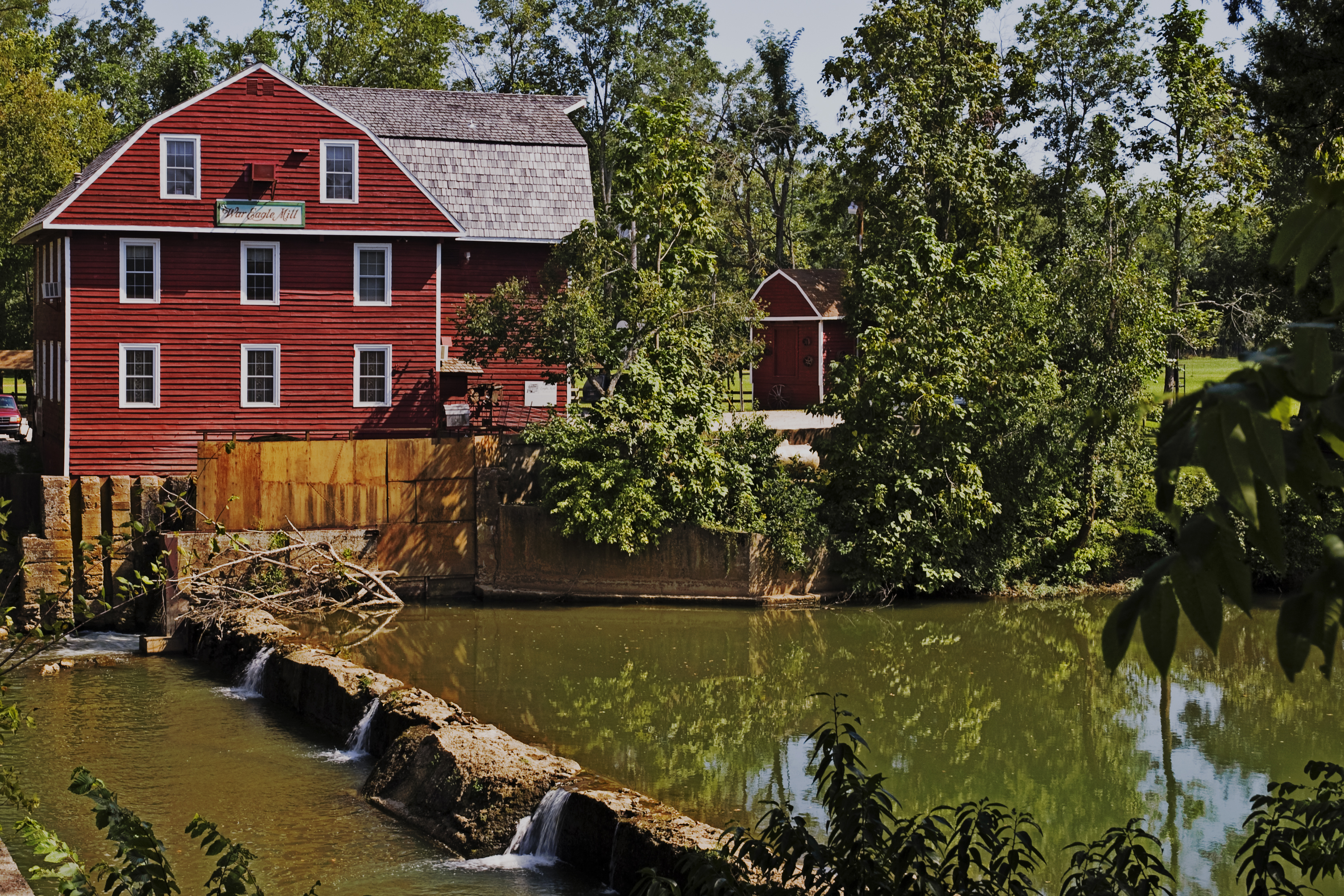
- War Eagle Mill

- Location within Arkansas
- Coordinates: 36°16′04″N 93°56′28″W
- Country: United States
- State: Arkansas
- County: Benton
- Elevation: 1,178 ft (359 m)
- GNIS feature ID: 78688

War Eagle is an unincorporated community in Benton County, Arkansas, United States. It is the location of (or is the nearest community to) War Eagle Bridge, which carries CR 98 over War Eagle Creek and is listed on the National Register of Historic Places.

Variant names were "Blackburn Mill", "Wareagle", and "War Eagle Mills". The community takes its name from War Eagle Mill, a local gristmill on War Eagle Creek. A post office called War Eagle Mills was established in 1876, the name was changed to Wareagle in 1894, and the post office closed in 1967.

Since 1954, War Eagle has hosted the Ozark Arts & Crafts Fair, also known as the War Eagle Fair.
