= Clifty, Arkansas =

- Unincorporated community
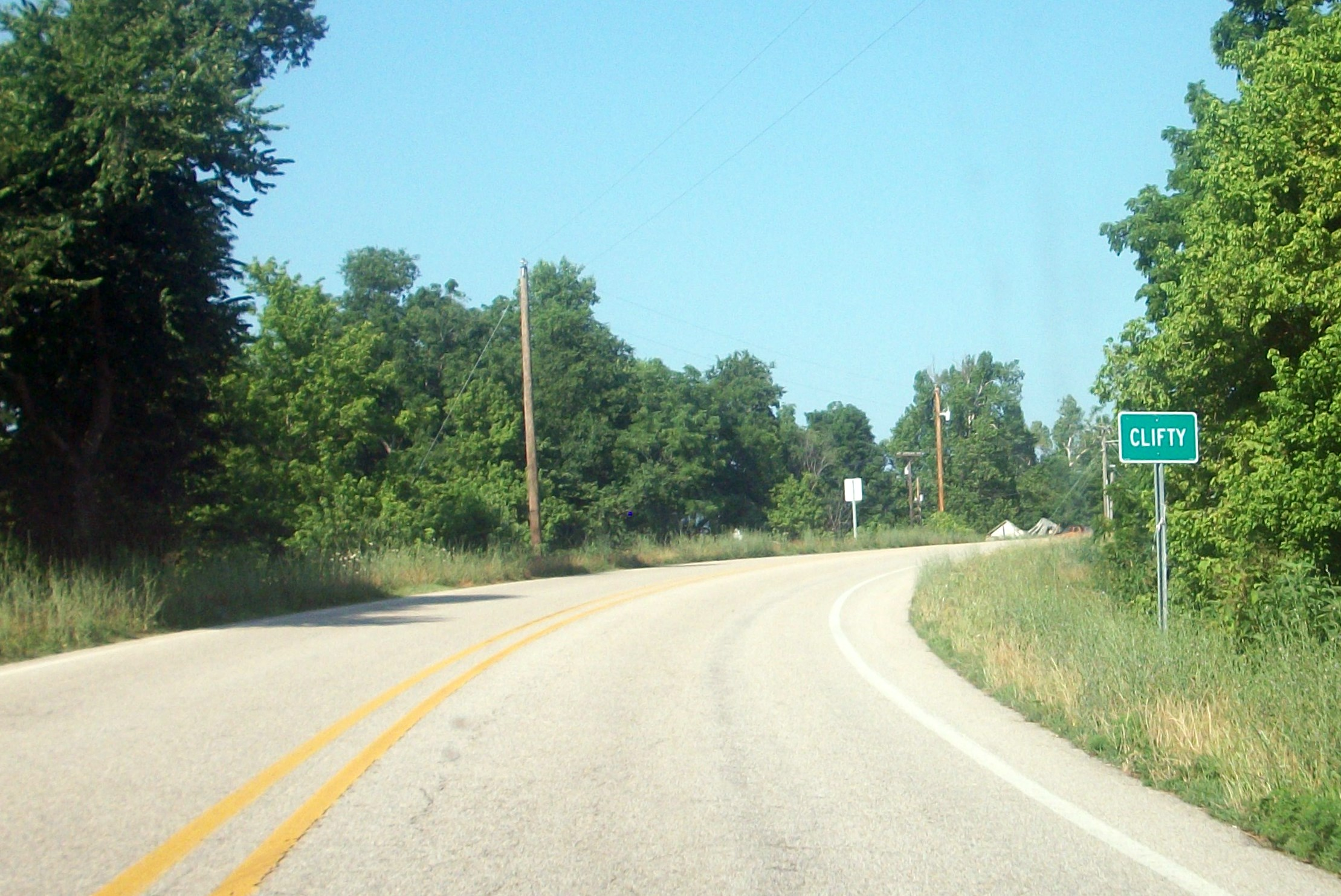
- Entrance to Clifty on Highway 12

- Location within Arkansas Location within the United States
- Coordinates: 36°14′14″N 93°47′47″W
- Country: United States
- State: Arkansas
- County: Madison
- Elevation: 1,414 ft (431 m)
- Time zone: UTC-6 (Central (CST))
  - Summer (DST): UTC-5 (CDT)
- GNIS feature ID: 57556

Clifty is an unincorporated community in Madison County, Arkansas, United States. It is located on Arkansas Highway 12.

The Hall of Fame baseball player Arky Vaughan was born in Clifty.
