= Withrow Springs State Park =

Park in Arkansas, USA

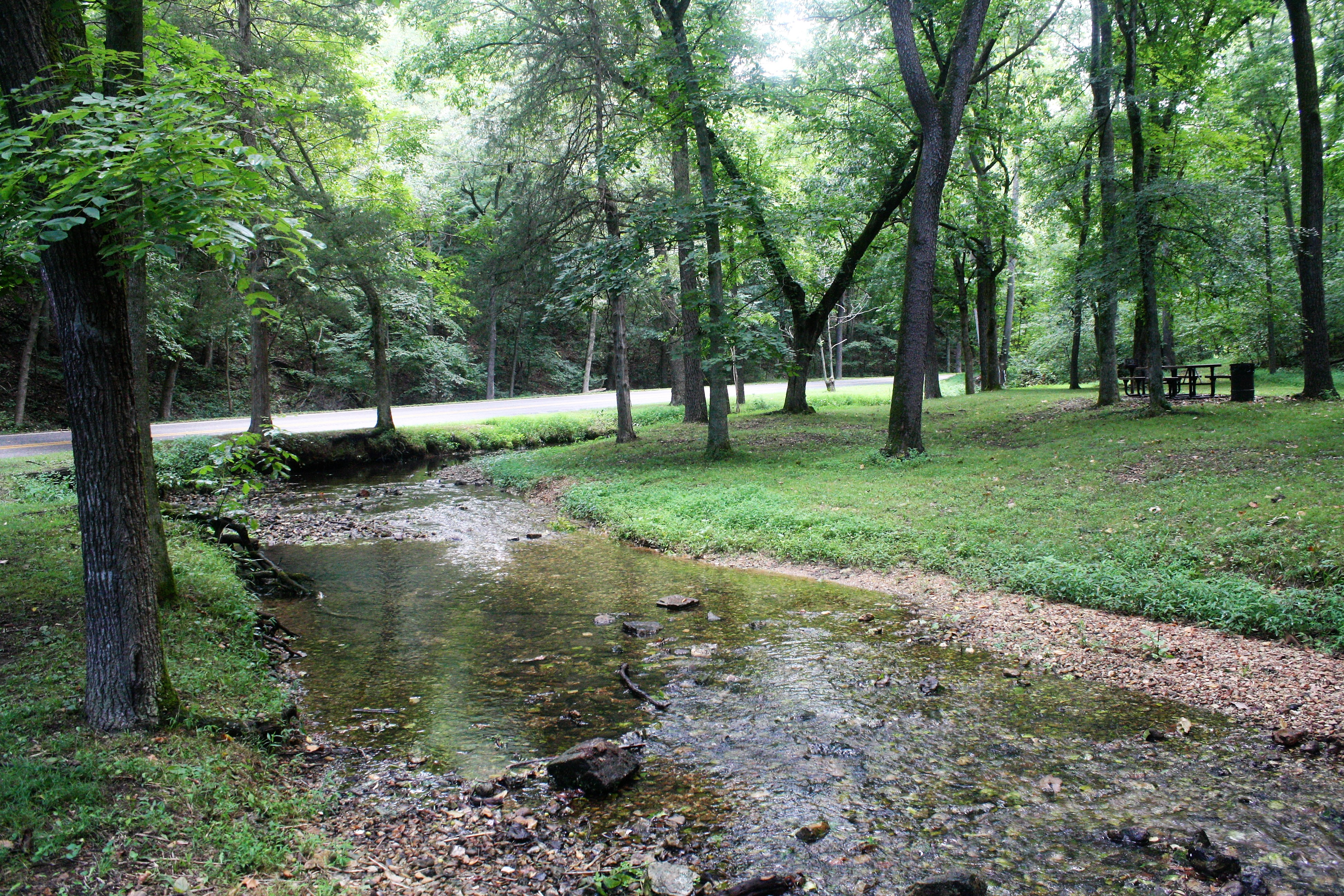

- Location within Arkansas Location within the United States
- Interactive map of Withrow Springs State Park
- Location: Madison County, Arkansas, United States
- Coordinates: 36°09′17″N 93°44′11″W
- Area: 786 acres (318 ha)
- Elevation: 1,375 feet (419 m)
- Established: 1965
- Administrator: Arkansas Department of Parks, Heritage, and Tourism
- Website: Official website
- Arkansas State Parks

Withrow Springs State Park is a 786-acre (318 ha) public recreation area with campgrounds and hiking trails located five miles (8.0 km) north of Huntsville, Arkansas, that serves as a put-in for float trips on War Eagle Creek.
