= War Eagle Creek =

Stream in the American state of Arkansas

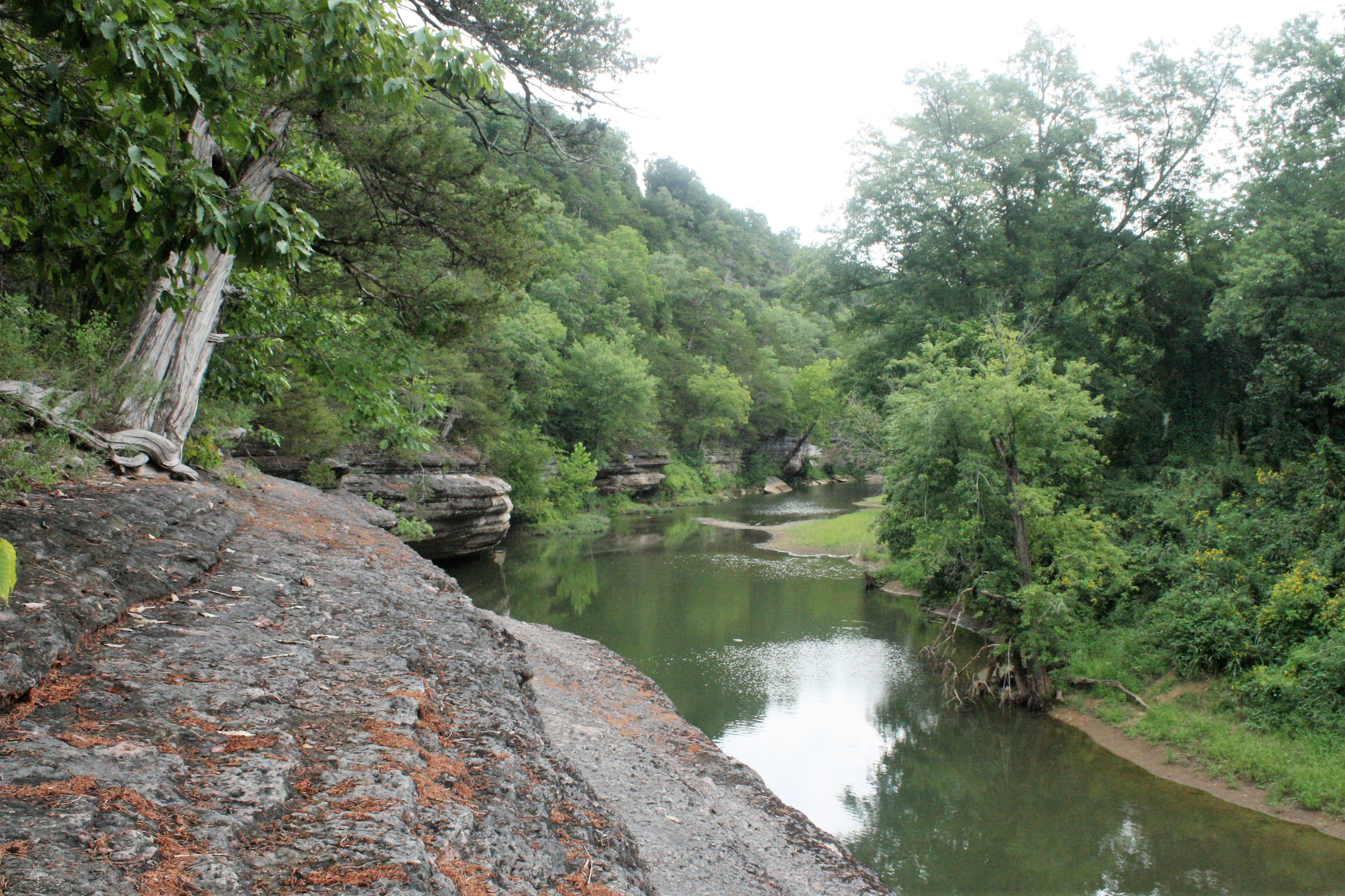
- War Eagle Creek at Withrow Springs State Park

- Location of the mouth of the War Eagle Creek in Arkansas
- Etymology: War Eagle, a Native American chiefton

Location
- Country: United States
- State: Arkansas

Physical characteristics
- Source
  - coordinates: 35°50′28″N 93°37′10″W
- Mouth
  - coordinates: 36°13′47″N 93°59′53″W
- Discharge
  - location: Hindsville, AR
  - average: 299 cu/ft. per sec.

Basin features
- Progression: White River—Mississippi River
- River system: Mississippi River
- Bridges: Eagle Creek Bridge
- GNIS feature ID: 56034

War Eagle Creek is a stream in Benton, Washington and Madison counties of northwest Arkansas, United States, that is a tributary of the White River.

== Description ==
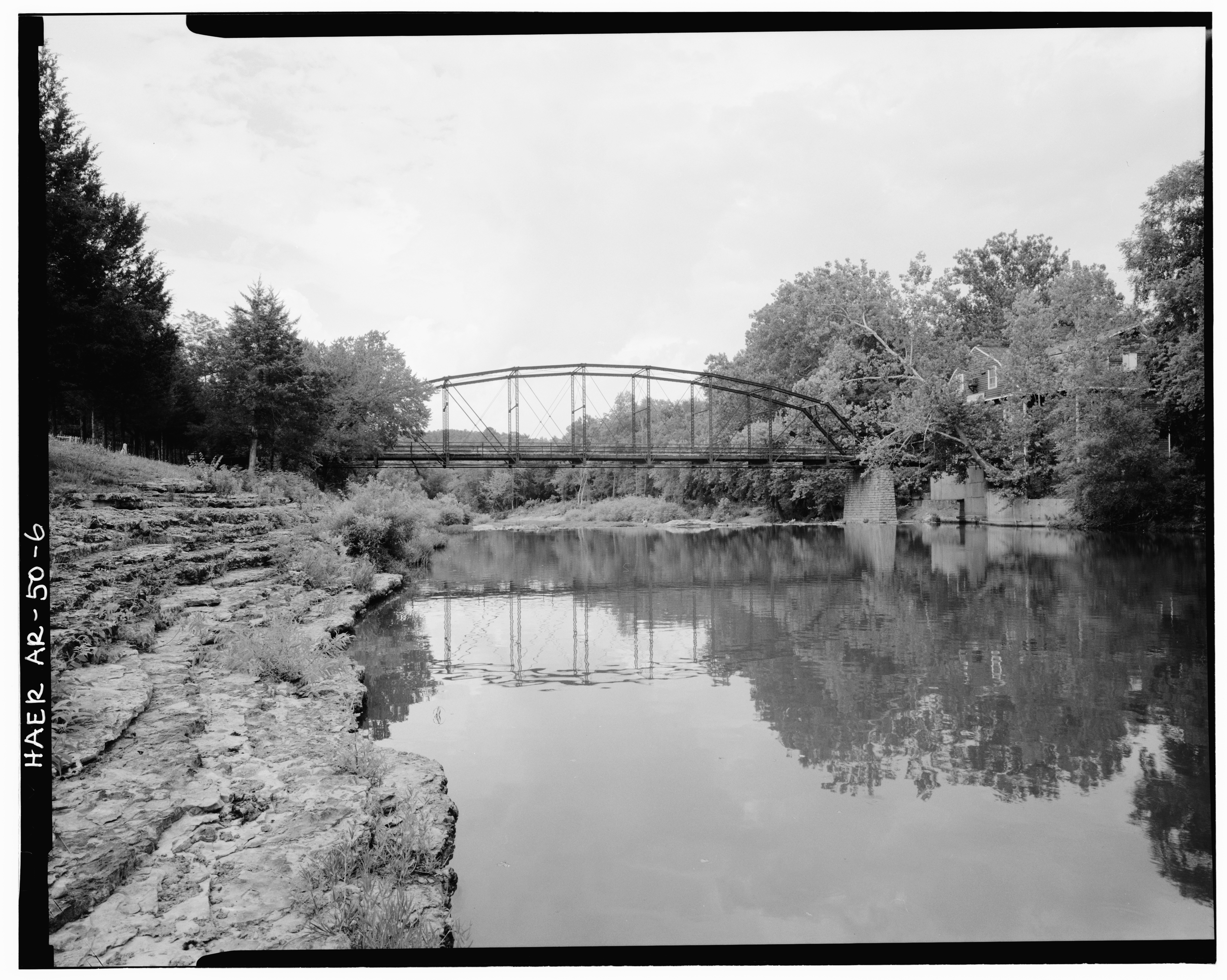
War Eagle Creek, as it passes under the War Eagle Bridge

The stream source area is in Madison County in the Boston Mountains just west of the community of Boston and north of Arkansas Route 16 at an elevation of about 2,100 feet (640 m). The stream flows northwest passing under and then running parallel to Arkansas Route 23 passing the communities of Witter and Aurora. It flows past the east side of Huntsville and crosses under U.S. Route 412 northeast of Harmony. It turns to the northwest as passes the south side of Withrow Springs State Park and under Route 23 again. It continues passing under Arkansas Highway 45 to the north of Hindsville and passes through the northeast corner of Washington County and into Benton County. The stream passes under Arkansas Highway 303 just west of War Eagle and makes a sharp turn (incised meander) to the south. The stream enters the waters of Beaver Lake just prior to re-entering Washington County. Prior to the creation of Beaver Lake, the stream entered the White River about three miles to the west-southwest.

The creek has the name of War Eagle, an Indian chieftain.

== See also ==
- List of rivers of Arkansas
