= Huntsville, Arkansas =

- City
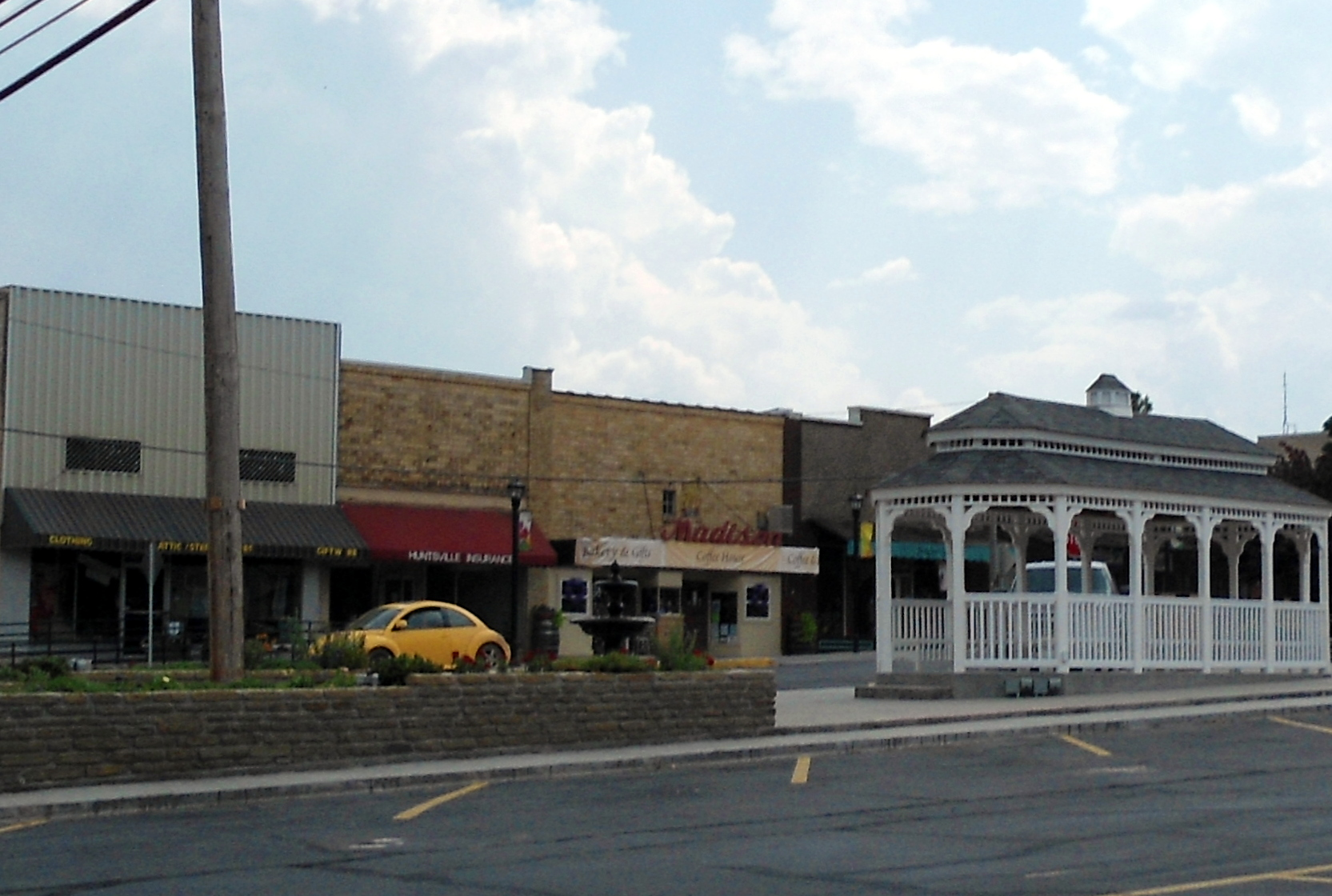
- Huntsville Commercial Historic District

- Flag Logo
- Motto: "Crossroads of the Ozarks"
- Location in Madison County, Arkansas
- Coordinates: 36°05′55″N 93°44′11″W
- Country: United States
- State: Arkansas
- County: Madison

Government
  - Mayor: Travis Dotson

Area
  - Total: 5.40 sq mi (13.98 km^{2})
  - Land: 5.38 sq mi (13.94 km^{2})
  - Water: 0.019 sq mi (0.05 km^{2})
- Elevation: 1,486 ft (453 m)

Population (2020)
  - Total: 2,879
  - Estimate (2025): 3,576 ▲
  - Density: 535.0/sq mi (206.55/km^{2})
- Time zone: UTC-6 (Central (CST))
  - Summer (DST): UTC-5 (CDT)
- ZIP code: 72740
- Area code: 479
- FIPS code: 05-33970
- GNIS feature ID: 2404747
- Website: www.huntsvillearkansas.org

Huntsville is a city in and the county seat of Madison County, Arkansas, United States. The population was 2,867 at the 2020 census, up from 2,346 in 2010. During the American Civil War in 1862, it was the site of what became known as the Huntsville Massacre. Huntsville is part of the Northwest Arkansas region.

== History ==
The city is named after Huntsville, Alabama, the hometown of some early settlers.

In 1863, eight suspected Confederate sympathizers were extrajudicially executed by the Union Army, one survived. Huntsville incorporated as a town after the Civil War in 1877. The community was incorporated as a city on July 16, 1925.

== Geography ==
Huntsville is located north of the center of Madison County in the northwest part of the Arkansas Ozarks. Via U.S. Route 412 it is 28 miles (45 km) east of Springdale and 47 miles (76 km) west of Harrison.

According to the United States Census Bureau, the city has a total area of 5.4 square miles (14 km^{2}), of which 0.02 square miles (0.05 km^{2}), or 0.33%, are water. Town Branch flows northward through the east side of the city, ending at Holman Creek in the northern part of the city. Holman Creek flows north into War Eagle Creek, which continues northwest to the White River east of Springdale.

== Demographics ==
Historical population
Census	Pop.	Note	%±
1850	255		—
1860	251		−1.6%
1870	224		−10.8%
1880	312		39.3%
1890	362		16.0%
1930	602		—
1940	776		28.9%
1950	1,010		30.2%
1960	1,050		4.0%
1970	1,287		22.6%
1980	1,394		8.3%
1990	1,605		15.1%
2000	1,931		20.3%
2010	2,346		21.5%
2020	2,879		22.7%
2025 (est.)	3,576	▲	24.2%
U.S. Decennial Census

=== 2020 census ===
Huntsville racial composition
Race	Number	Percentage
White (non-Hispanic)	2,086	72.46%
Black or African American (non-Hispanic)	12	0.42%
Native American	34	1.18%
Asian	7	0.24%
Pacific Islander	222	7.71%
Other/Mixed	150	5.21%
Hispanic or Latino	368	12.78%

As of the 2020 census, Huntsville had a population of 2,879. The median age was 33.2 years. 30.0% of residents were under the age of 18 and 17.5% of residents were 65 years of age or older. For every 100 females there were 84.9 males, and for every 100 females age 18 and over there were 83.6 males age 18 and over.

0.0% of residents lived in urban areas, while 100.0% lived in rural areas.

There were 1,003 households in Huntsville, of which 41.7% had children under the age of 18 living in them. Of all households, 38.3% were married-couple households, 19.0% were households with a male householder and no spouse or partner present, and 33.4% were households with a female householder and no spouse or partner present. About 31.5% of all households were made up of individuals and 15.8% had someone living alone who was 65 years of age or older.

There were 1,116 housing units, of which 10.1% were vacant. The homeowner vacancy rate was 2.2% and the rental vacancy rate was 7.0%.

=== Income and poverty ===
The median income for a household in the city was $34,167, and the median income for a family was $48,952. Males had a median income of $26,929 versus $19,766 for females. The per capita income for the city was $14,686. About 29.0% of the population were below the poverty line, including 32.1% of those under age 18 and 16.7% of those age 65 or over.

== Government ==
Mayor–city council

Huntsville operates within the mayor–city council form of government. The mayor is elected by a citywide election to serve as the chief executive officer (CEO) of the city by presiding over all city functions, policies, rules and laws. Once elected, the mayor also allocates duties to city employees. The Huntsville mayoral election in coincidence with the election of the president of the United States. Mayors serve four-year terms and can serve unlimited terms. The city council is the unicameral legislative of the city, consisting of eight aldermen. Also included in the council's duties is balancing the city's budget and passing ordinances. Two aldermen are elected from each of the city's four wards.

Travis Dotson, Mayor

Abraham Travis Dotson has served Huntsville through multiple elected and appointed roles, beginning as a Planning Commissioner in 2019 and Alderman for Ward 1 in 2021 before being elected Mayor in 2023. His background includes 15 years with the City of Fayetteville and recognition as the Huntsville Chamber of Commerce’s 2017 Business Person of the Year. As Mayor, he is focused on responsible growth, strong city services, and a collaborative approach to community leadership.

Kevin Shinn, Fire Chief

Kevin Shinn has been the fire chief for the City of Huntsville since 2015. Shinn has been a member of the Huntsville Fire Department since 1985 and has served as a Captain and Assistant Chief before being promoted to Chief.

Huntsville Fire Department

The Huntsville Fire Department was organized shortly after WWII and formally recognized by the Insurance Services Office, the organization that establishes Public Protection Classifications, and the state of Arkansas in 1953. Since its inception, it has been staffed by volunteers within the community to respond to emergency situations ranging from fires to medical calls, to water rescues, vehicle extrications, and high angle rope rescues.

The members pride themselves on being aggressive with fire attacks, compassionate with medical assists, and ready to meet the challenges of those in imminent danger.

The Huntsville Fire Department is currently a combination fire department and holds an ISO Public Protection Classification of 3.

Joshua Herring, Police Chief

Joshua Herring has been the City of Huntsville Police Chief since 2025.

Huntsville Police Department

The Huntsville Police Department was established in 1985 and currently employs 13 full-time uniformed officers and two office staff members.

== Economy ==
Top Employers Huntsville Economic Development
#	Employer
1	Butterball, LLC
2	Huntsville School District
3	Ducommun
4	Walmart Stores Inc.
5	Lew Thompson & Sons, Inc.
6	Packers Sanitation Services, Inc.
7	Anderson Gas & Propane, Inc.
8	Meadowview Healthcare & Rehab
9	Kingston School District
10	McDonald's (fast food)

== Education ==
About 28% of students were proficient in reading on state assessments, according to recent reported data. 23% of students within the Huntsville School District are proficient in math. ACT reading, English, and math scores are consistently below state averages.

The Huntsville School District provides public elementary and secondary education leading to graduation at Huntsville High School.

The Huntsville Public Library, part of the Madison Carroll and Madison Library System, is located at 827 N. College Street, which provides patrons of the library system access to print books, publications, multimedia content, internet access, public computer access, as well as access to an Interlibrary loan system.

== Infrastructure ==
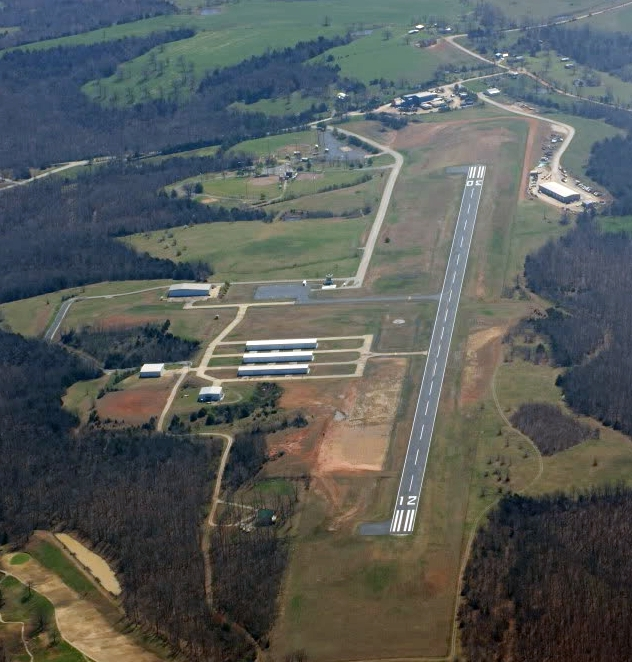
Huntsville Municipal Airport

=== Transportation ===
==== Major highways ====
- U.S. Route 412
- U.S. Route 412 Business
- Highway 23
- Highway 74

==== Aviation ====
The Huntsville Municipal Airport is a city-owned, public-use airport located two nautical miles (4 km) southwest of Huntsville's central business district.

== Notable people ==
- Joe Berry, Major League Baseball pitcher for the Chicago Cubs, Philadelphia Athletics, and Cleveland Indians
- Orval E. Faubus, 36th governor of Arkansas during the desegregation days; lived in Huntsville as a youth, having been born in the nearby Combs community
- Ronnie Hawkins, legendary rockabilly musician; his band The Hawks later became The Band; born in Huntsville
- Gary Miller, Republican congressman from California; born in Huntsville
- Isaac Murphy, politician who lived and worked in Huntsville; elected as governor in 1863 after Union occupation of Little Rock
- Danny L. Patrick, Republican member of the Arkansas House of Representatives from Madison and Carroll counties from 1967 to 1970; taught school in Huntsville from 1964 to 1971
