= List of places in Arkansas: M =

Arkansas State Seal

This list of current cities, towns, unincorporated communities, and other recognized places in the U.S. state of Arkansas whose name begins with the letter M. It also includes information on the number and names of counties in which the place lies, and its lower and upper zip code bounds, if applicable.

| Name of place | Number of counties | Principal county | Lower zip code | Upper zip code |
|---|---|---|---|---|
| Mabelvale | 1 | Pulaski County | 72103 | |
| Maberry | 1 | Woodruff County | 72036 | |
| McAlmont | 1 | Pulaski County | 72117 | |
| McArthur | 1 | Desha County | 71654 | |
| McCaskill | 1 | Hempstead County | 71847 | |
| McClelland | 1 | Woodruff County | 72006 | |
| McClendons Corner | 1 | Mississippi County | | |
| McCormick | 1 | Poinsett County | 72472 | |
| McCreanor | 1 | Lonoke County | | |
| McCrory | 1 | Woodruff County | 72101 | |
| McDonald | 1 | Cross County | 72373 | |
| McDougal | 1 | Clay County | 72441 | |
| Macedonia | 1 | Columbia County | 71753 | |
| Macedonia | 1 | Conway County | 72063 | |
| Macedonia | 1 | Yell County | 72833 | |
| McElroy | 1 | Cross County | | |
| Macey | 1 | Craighead County | 72447 | |
| McFadden | 1 | Jackson County | 72347 | |
| McFerrin | 1 | Mississippi County | 72370 | |
| McGehee | 1 | Desha County | 71654 | |
| McGintytown | 1 | Faulkner County | 72058 | |
| McGlendon Mill | 1 | Union County | | |
| McGregor | 1 | Woodruff County | | |
| McHue | 1 | Independence County | 72501 | |
| McJester | 1 | Cleburne County | 72121 | |
| McKamie | 1 | Lafayette County | 71860 | |
| McKennon Ford | 1 | Carroll County | | |
| McKinney | 1 | Bradley County | 71671 | |
| McKinney | 1 | Miller County | | |
| McKnight | 1 | Columbia County | | |
| Macks | 1 | Jackson County | 72112 | |
| McManus | 1 | Cross County | | |
| McMillan Corner | 1 | Chicot County | 71653 | |
| McNab | 1 | Hempstead County | 71838 | |
| McNair | 1 | Washington County | | |
| McNeil | 1 | Columbia County | 71752 | |
| Macon | 1 | Pulaski County | 72076 | |
| Macon Lake | 1 | Chicot County | 71653 | |
| McPhearson | 1 | Baxter County | 72519 | |
| McRae | 1 | White County | 72102 | |
| Madding | 1 | Jefferson County | 72004 | |
| Maddox | 1 | Garland County | | |
| Madison | 1 | St. Francis County | 72359 | |
| Magazine | 1 | Logan County | 72943 | |
| Magic Springs | 1 | Searcy County | 72676 | |
| Magnesia Springs | 1 | Columbia County | | |
| Magness | 1 | Independence County | 72553 | |
| Magnet | 1 | Hot Spring County | | |
| Magnet Cove | 1 | Hot Spring County | 72104 | |
| Magnolia | 1 | Columbia County | 71753 | |
| Main Street | 1 | Pulaski County | 72119 | |
| Majors | 1 | Clark County | | |
| Mallet Town | 1 | Conway County | 72157 | |
| Mallory | 1 | Crittenden County | | |
| Mallory Spur | 1 | Crittenden County | | |
| Malloy | 1 | Union County | | |
| Malvern | 1 | Hot Spring County | 72104 | |
| Malvern & Freeo Valley Junction | 1 | Hot Spring County | | |
| Mammoth Spring | 1 | Fulton County | 72554 | |
| Mandalay | 1 | Mississippi County | 72442 | |
| Mandeville | 1 | Miller County | 71801 | |
| Manfred | 1 | Montgomery County | 71935 | |
| Mangrum | 1 | Craighead County | 72414 | |
| Manila | 1 | Mississippi County | 72442 | |
| Manning | 1 | Dallas County | 71763 | |
| Mansfield | 2 | Scott County | 72944 | |
| Mansfield | 2 | Sebastian County | 72944 | |
| Manson | 1 | Randolph County | 72455 | |
| Many Islands | 1 | Fulton County | | |
| Maple | 1 | Carroll County | | |
| Maple Corner | 1 | Phillips County | | |
| Maple Grove | 1 | Poinsett County | 72472 | |
| Maple Springs | 1 | Independence County | | |
| Marble | 1 | Madison County | 72740 | |
| Marble Falls | 1 | Newton County | | |
| Marcella | 1 | Stone County | 72555 | |
| Marche | 1 | Pulaski County | 72117 | |
| Marcus | 1 | Hot Spring County | | |
| Marianna | 1 | Lee County | 72360 | |
| Marie | 1 | Mississippi County | 72395 | |
| Marion | 1 | Crittenden County | 72364 | |
| Marked Tree | 1 | Poinsett County | 72365 | |
| Marmaduke | 1 | Greene County | 72443 | |
| Marsena | 1 | Searcy County | | |
| Marshall | 1 | Searcy County | 72650 | |
| Mars Hill | 1 | Lafayette County | 71860 | |
| Mars Hill | 1 | Pope County | | |
| Martindale | 1 | Pulaski County | 72205 | |
| Martin Spring | 1 | Johnson County | | |
| Martinville | 2 | Conway County | 72039 | |
| Martinville | 2 | Faulkner County | 72039 | |
| Marvell | 1 | Phillips County | 72366 | |
| Marvinville | 1 | Yell County | 72842 | |
| Mary Spur | 1 | Phillips County | | |
| Marysville | 1 | Union County | 71753 | |
| Mason Valley | 1 | Benton County | 72712 | |
| Masonville | 1 | Desha County | 71654 | |
| Massard | 1 | Sebastian County | 72906 | |
| Maumee | 1 | Searcy County | | |
| Maumelle | 1 | Pulaski County | 72118 | |
| Maumelle New Town | 1 | Pulaski County | 72118 | |
| Maumelle Ordnance Plant | 1 | Pulaski County | | |
| Maxville | 1 | Sharp County | 72521 | |
| Mayfield | 1 | Washington County | 72701 | |
| Mayflower | 1 | Faulkner County | 72106 | |
| Maynard | 1 | Randolph County | 72444 | |
| Maysville | 1 | Benton County | 72747 | |
| Mayton | 1 | Miller County | | |
| Mayview | 1 | Arkansas County | | |
| Mazarn | 1 | Montgomery County | 71933 | |
| Meadowcliff | 1 | Pulaski County | | |
| Meadow Cliff | 1 | St. Francis County | 72335 | |
| Meadowlark | 1 | Pulaski County | | |
| Meadow Park | 1 | Pulaski County | | |
| Meadows | 1 | Crawford County | | |
| Medina | 1 | Arkansas County | | |
| Medlock | 1 | Columbia County | | |
| Meeks Settlement | 1 | Clark County | | |
| Meg | 1 | Franklin County | 72949 | |
| Melbourne | 1 | Izard County | 72556 | |
| Mellwood | 1 | Phillips County | 72367 | |
| Melrose | 1 | Stone County | 72550 | |
| Mena | 1 | Polk County | 71953 | |
| Mendenhall | 1 | Nevada County | | |
| Meneshea | 1 | Crittenden County | | |
| Menifee | 1 | Conway County | 72107 | |
| Meridian | 1 | Ashley County | 71635 | |
| Meroney | 1 | Lincoln County | 71643 | |
| Merrivale | 1 | Pulaski County | 72204 | |
| Mersman | 1 | Cross County | | |
| Mesa | 1 | Prairie County | 72041 | |
| Metalton | 1 | Carroll County | 72616 | |
| Meto | 1 | Lonoke County | | |
| Meyers | 1 | Garland County | | |
| Mickles | 1 | Yell County | | |
| Mid-America | 1 | Garland County | 71913 | |
| Middlebrook | 1 | Randolph County | 72444 | |
| Middleton | 1 | Conway County | 72027 | |
| Midland | 1 | Sebastian County | 72945 | |
| Midway | 1 | Baxter County | 72651 | |
| Midway | 1 | Clark County | | |
| Midway | 1 | Hot Spring County | 71941 | |
| Midway | 1 | Howard County | 71852 | |
| Midway | 1 | Jackson County | | |
| Midway | 1 | Jefferson County | | |
| Midway | 1 | Lafayette County | 71845 | |
| Midway | 1 | Lee County | | |
| Midway | 1 | Logan County | 72865 | |
| Midway | 1 | Marion County | | |
| Midway | 1 | Mississippi County | | |
| Midway | 1 | Nevada County | 71857 | |
| Midway | 1 | St. Francis County | | |
| Midway | 1 | White County | | |
| Midway | 1 | White County | | |
| Midway Corner | 1 | Crittenden County | 72376 | |
| Milford | 1 | Sevier County | 71846 | |
| Mill Creek | 1 | Pope County | 72801 | |
| Mill Creek | 1 | Sebastian County | 72906 | |
| Miller | 1 | Greene County | | |
| Miller | 1 | Little River County | 71836 | |
| Millers | 1 | Crittenden County | | |
| Millers Bluff | 1 | Ouachita County | 71751 | |
| Millerville | 1 | Grant County | | |
| Mill Ford | 1 | Bradley County | | |
| Milligan Ridge | 1 | Mississippi County | 72442 | |
| Milltown | 1 | Sebastian County | 72936 | |
| Millville | 1 | Ouachita County | | |
| Millwood | 1 | Little River County | | |
| Milo | 1 | Ashley County | 71646 | |
| Milrose | 1 | Sevier County | | |
| Milton Ford | 1 | Franklin County | | |
| Mineola | 1 | Howard County | | |
| Mineral | 1 | Sevier County | 71841 | |
| Mineral Springs | 1 | Franklin County | | |
| Mineral Springs | 1 | Howard County | 71851 | |
| Minorca | 1 | Randolph County | 72444 | |
| Minturn | 1 | Lawrence County | 72445 | |
| Mist | 1 | Ashley County | 71646 | |
| Mitchell | 1 | Clay County | | |
| Mitchell | 1 | Fulton County | 72583 | |
| Mitchell Mill | 1 | Greene County | | |
| Mitchellville | 1 | Desha County | 71639 | |
| Mixon | 1 | Logan County | 72927 | |
| Moark | 1 | Clay County | 72422 | |
| Modoc | 1 | Phillips County | 72333 | |
| Moffit | 1 | Washington County | 72753 | |
| Moko | 1 | Fulton County | 72557 | |
| Monarch | 1 | Marion County | 72687 | |
| Monette | 1 | Craighead County | 72447 | |
| Monkey Run | 1 | Baxter County | 72635 | |
| Monnie Springs | 1 | Pulaski County | | |
| Monroe | 1 | Monroe County | 72108 | |
| Montana | 1 | Johnson County | 72840 | |
| Monte Ne | 1 | Benton County | 72756 | |
| Monte Ne Shores | 1 | Benton County | | |
| Monterey | 1 | Cross County | 72373 | |
| Monticello | 1 | Drew County | 71655 | |
| Montongo | 1 | Drew County | 71655 | |
| Montreal | 1 | Sebastian County | 72945 | |
| Montrose | 1 | Ashley County | 71658 | |
| Moore | 1 | Newton County | 72856 | |
| Moorefield | 1 | Independence County | 72501 | |
| Moores Mill | 1 | Bradley County | | |
| Moran | 1 | Mississippi County | | |
| Moreland | 1 | Pope County | 72849 | |
| Morgan | 1 | Pulaski County | | |
| Morganton | 1 | Van Buren County | 72013 | |
| Morning Star | 1 | Garland County | 71913 | |
| Morning Star | 1 | Greene County | | |
| Morning Star | 1 | Hot Spring County | | |
| Morning Star | 1 | Searcy County | 72650 | |
| Morning Sun | 1 | White County | 72143 | |
| Moro | 1 | Lee County | 72368 | |
| Moro Bay | 1 | Bradley County | 71651 | |
| Morrilton | 1 | Conway County | 72110 | |
| Morris | 1 | Nevada County | | |
| Morrison Bluff | 1 | Logan County | 72863 | |
| Morriston | 1 | Fulton County | 72559 | |
| Morrow | 1 | Washington County | 72749 | |
| Morton | 1 | Woodruff County | 72101 | |
| Mosby | 1 | Phillips County | 72367 | |
| Mosby Spur | 1 | Phillips County | | |
| Moscow | 1 | Jefferson County | 71659 | |
| Mosley | 1 | Yell County | 72834 | |
| Mossville | 1 | Newton County | 72641 | |
| Mound City | 1 | Crittenden County | | |
| Mounds | 1 | Cross County | | |
| Mounds | 1 | Greene County | 72450 | |
| Mountainburg | 1 | Crawford County | 72946 | |
| Mountain Crest | 1 | Franklin County | 72727 | |
| Mountain Fork | 1 | Polk County | 71953 | |
| Mountain Grove | 1 | Franklin County | | |
| Mountain Home | 1 | Baxter County | 72653 | |
| Mountain Home | 1 | White County | 72121 | |
| Mountain Pine | 1 | Garland County | 71956 | |
| Mountain Springs | 1 | Lonoke County | | |
| Mountain Top | 1 | Franklin County | 72949 | |
| Mountain Valley | 1 | Garland County | 71901 | |
| Mountain View | 1 | Stone County | 72560 | |
| Mount Carmel | 1 | Independence County | | |
| Mount Elba | 1 | Cleveland County | | |
| Mount Gayler | 1 | Crawford County | 72959 | |
| Mount George | 1 | Yell County | 72833 | |
| Mount Hersey | 1 | Newton County | 72685 | |
| Mount Holly | 1 | Union County | 71758 | |
| Mount Ida | 1 | Montgomery County | 71957 | |
| Mount Judea | 1 | Newton County | 72655 | |
| Mount Moriah | 1 | Hot Spring County | | |
| Mount Moriah | 1 | Nevada County | | |
| Mount Moriah | 1 | Pike County | 71958 | |
| Mount Olive | 1 | Bradley County | 71647 | |
| Mount Olive | 1 | Faulkner County | | |
| Mount Olive | 1 | Izard County | 72556 | |
| Mount Olive | 1 | Poinsett County | | |
| Mount Olive | 1 | Washington County | 72727 | |
| Mount Pilgrim | 1 | Pulaski County | | |
| Mount Pisgah | 1 | White County | 72143 | |
| Mount Pleasant | 1 | Fulton County | | |
| Mount Pleasant | 1 | Izard County | 72561 | |
| Mount Pleasant | 1 | Miller County | | |
| Mount Pleasant | 1 | Nevada County | | |
| Mount Sherman | 1 | Newton County | 72641 | |
| Mount Tabor | 1 | Drew County | 71655 | |
| Mount Tabor | 1 | Garland County | 71934 | |
| Mount Vernon | 1 | Faulkner County | 72111 | |
| Mount Vernon | 1 | Johnson County | 72840 | |
| Mount Zion | 1 | Cleveland County | | |
| Mozart | 1 | Desha County | | |
| Mozart | 1 | Stone County | 72051 | |
| Muddyfork | 1 | Howard County | 71852 | |
| Mud Lake | 1 | St. Francis County | | |
| Muir | 1 | Mississippi County | | |
| Mulberry | 1 | Crawford County | 72947 | |
| Muller | 1 | Ashley County | | |
| Mulligan | 1 | Poinsett County | | |
| Murfreesboro | 1 | Pike County | 71958 | |
| Murphy's Corner | 1 | Jackson County | 72112 | |
| Murray | 1 | Newton County | 72666 | |
| Murta | 1 | Lawrence County | | |
| Mustin Lake | 1 | Ouachita County | 71701 | |
| Myersville | 1 | Izard County | | |
| Myron | 1 | Izard County | 72513 | |

== Townships ==
| Name of place | Number of counties | Principal county | Lower zip code | Upper zip code |
|---|---|---|---|---|
| McFall Township | 1 | Arkansas County | | |
| McGavock Township | 1 | Mississippi County | | |
| McHue Township | 1 | Independence County | | |
| McIlroy Township | 1 | Franklin County | | |
| McJester Township | 1 | Cleburne County | | |
| McKennon Township | 1 | Johnson County | | |
| McLaren Township | 1 | Conway County | | |
| McNeil Township | 1 | Columbia County | | |
| McRae Township | 1 | White County | | |
| Madison Township | 1 | Grant County | | |
| Madison Township | 1 | Howard County | | |
| Madison Township | 1 | St. Francis County | | |
| Magazine Township | 1 | Yell County | | |
| Magness Township | 1 | Independence County | | |
| Magness Township | 1 | Lonoke County | | |
| Magnet Township | 1 | Hot Spring County | | |
| Magnolia Township | 1 | Columbia County | | |
| Main Shore Township | 1 | Greene County | | |
| Mammoth Spring Township | 1 | Fulton County | | |
| Manchester Township | 1 | Dallas County | | |
| Marais Saline Township | 1 | Ashley County | | |
| Marble Township | 1 | Madison County | | |
| Marble Township | 1 | Saline County | | |
| Marble City Township | 1 | Newton County | | |
| Marcella Township | 1 | Stone County | | |
| Marie Saline Township | 1 | Ashley County | | |
| Marion Township | 1 | Bradley County | | |
| Marion Township | 1 | Drew County | | |
| Marion Township | 1 | Lawrence County | | |
| Marion Township | 1 | Ouachita County | | |
| Marion Township | 1 | Phillips County | | |
| Marion Township | 1 | Sebastian County | | |
| Marion Township | 1 | White County | | |
| Marrs Hill Township | 1 | Washington County | | |
| Marshall Township | 1 | White County | | |
| Marshell Township | 1 | Independence County | | |
| Mars Hill Township | 1 | Lafayette County | | |
| Martin Township | 1 | Conway County | | |
| Martin Township | 1 | Pope County | | |
| Mason Township | 1 | Yell County | | |
| Mason Valley Township | 1 | Benton County | | |
| Matney Township | 1 | Baxter County | | |
| Matthews Township | 1 | Faulkner County | | |
| Maumee Township | 1 | Searcy County | | |
| Maumelle Township | 1 | Craighead County | | |
| Maumelle Township | 1 | Perry County | | |
| Maxey Township | 1 | Crawford County | | |
| Mazarn Township | 1 | Garland County | | |
| Mazarn Township | 1 | Montgomery County | | |
| Melton Township | 1 | Jefferson County | | |
| Merry Green Township | 1 | Grant County | | |
| Middle Township | 1 | Franklin County | | |
| Midway Township | 1 | Hot Spring County | | |
| Mill Township | 1 | Baxter County | | |
| Mill Township | 1 | Garland County | | |
| Mill Bayou Township | 1 | Arkansas County | | |
| Mill Creek Township | 1 | Ashley County | | |
| Mill Creek Township | 1 | Franklin County | | |
| Mill Creek Township | 1 | Izard County | | |
| Mill Creek Township | 1 | Lincoln County | | |
| Mill Creek Township | 1 | Madison County | | |
| Mill Creek Township | 1 | Polk County | | |
| Mill Creek Township | 1 | Scott County | | |
| Mill Creek Township | 1 | Sevier County | | |
| Miller Township | 1 | Cleveland County | | |
| Miller Township | 1 | Franklin County | | |
| Mine Creek Township | 1 | Hempstead County | | |
| Mineral Township | 1 | Sevier County | | |
| Mineral Springs Township | 1 | Howard County | | |
| Mississippi Township | 1 | Crittenden County | | |
| Mississippi Township | 1 | Desha County | | |
| Mississippi Township | 1 | Sebastian County | | |
| Missouri Township | 1 | Clark County | | |
| Missouri Township | 1 | Nevada County | | |
| Missouri Township | 1 | Pike County | | |
| Mitchell Township | 1 | Cross County | | |
| Monroe Township | 1 | Mississippi County | | |
| Monroe Township | 1 | Sevier County | | |
| Montgomery Township | 1 | Hot Spring County | | |
| Montgomery Township | 1 | Monroe County | | |
| Montgomery-Smalley Township | 1 | Monroe County | | |
| Montrose Township | 1 | Ashley County | | |
| Mont Sandels Township | 1 | Sebastian County | | |
| Mooney Township | 1 | Phillips County | | |
| Moorefield Township | 1 | Independence County | | |
| Moreland Township | 1 | Pope County | | |
| Morgan Township | 1 | Cleburne County | | |
| Morgan Township | 1 | Franklin County | | |
| Morgan Township | 1 | Lawrence County | | |
| Morgan Township | 1 | Sharp County | | |
| Moro Township | 1 | Bradley County | | |
| Moro Township | 1 | Calhoun County | | |
| Morris Township | 1 | Arkansas County | | |
| Morrow Township | 1 | Washington County | | |
| Mound City Township | 1 | Crittenden County | | |
| Mountain Township | 1 | Cleburne County | | |
| Mountain Township | 1 | Crawford County | | |
| Mountain Township | 1 | Faulkner County | | |
| Mountain Township | 1 | Franklin County | | |
| Mountain Township | 1 | Howard County | | |
| Mountain Township | 1 | Logan County | | |
| Mountain Township | 1 | Pike County | | |
| Mountain Township | 1 | Polk County | | |
| Mountain Township | 1 | Scott County | | |
| Mountain Township | 1 | Van Buren County | | |
| Mountain Township | 1 | Yell County | | |
| Mountainburg Township | 1 | Crawford County | | |
| Mountain Home Township | 1 | Baxter County | | |
| Mount Calm Township | 1 | Fulton County | | |
| Mount Ida Township | 1 | Montgomery County | | |
| Mount Olive Township | 1 | Izard County | | |
| Mount Pisgah Township | 1 | White County | | |
| Mount Pleasant Township | 1 | Scott County | | |
| Mount Pleasant Township | 1 | Searcy County | | |
| Mount Vernon Township | 1 | Benton County | | |
| Mount Vernon Township | 1 | Faulkner County | | |
| Mount Vernon Township | 1 | Searcy County | | |
| Muddy Fork Township | 1 | Howard County | | |
| Muddy Fork Township | 1 | Pike County | | |
| Mulberry Township | 1 | Crawford County | | |
| Mulberry Township | 1 | Franklin County | | |
| Mulberry Township | 1 | Johnson County | | |
| Murray Township | 1 | Newton County | | |
| Myatt Township | 1 | Fulton County | | |
