= Midway, Arkansas =

Midway, Arkansas may refer to any one of many locations in the U.S. state of Arkansas:

- Midway, Baxter County, Arkansas, an unincorporated community and census-designated place in Baxter County
- Midway, Clark County, Arkansas, an unincorporated community in Clark County
- Midway, Hot Spring County, Arkansas, a town in Hot Spring County
- Midway, Howard County, Arkansas, an unincorporated community in Howard County
- Midway (ghost town), Howard County, Arkansas, a ghost town in Howard County
- Midway, Jackson County, Arkansas, an unincorporated community in Jackson County
- Midway, Jefferson County, Arkansas, an unincorporated community in Jefferson County
- Midway, Lafayette County, Arkansas, an unincorporated community in Lafayette County
- Midway, Lee County, Arkansas, an unincorporated community in Lee County
- Midway, Logan County, Arkansas, an unincorporated community in Logan County
- Midway, Marion County, Arkansas, an unincorporated community in Marion County
- Midway, Mississippi County, Arkansas, an unincorporated community in Mississippi County
- Midway, Nevada County, Arkansas, an unincorporated community in Nevada County
- Midway, St. Francis County, Arkansas, an unincorporated community in St. Francis County
- Midway (near Bald Knob), White County, Arkansas, an unincorporated community in White County near the city of Bald Knob
- Midway (near Pleasant Plains), White County, Arkansas, an unincorporated community in White County near the town of Pleasant Plains
