= List of tornadoes in Cleveland County, Oklahoma =

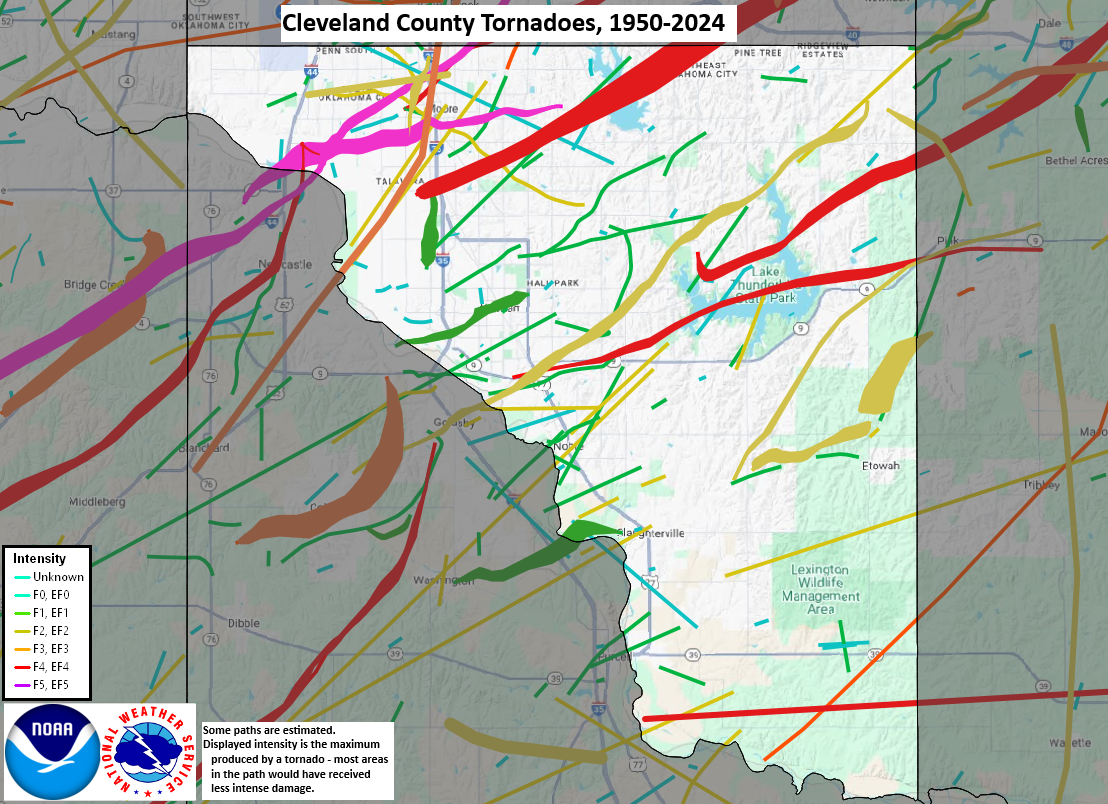
Cleveland County, Oklahoma Tornadoes (1950–2024)

This is a list of tornadoes reported in Cleveland County, Oklahoma. Cleveland County is located in Tornado Alley and experiences tornadoes frequently. The city of Moore is located within the county and has been impacted by four violent tornadoes in recent history; they struck in 1999, 2003, 2010, and 2013. It is one of two places on earth with the most tornadoes per square mile. According to the National Centers for Environmental Information, since reliable records began in 1950, 120 tornadoes have impacted the county, causing at least $2.77 billion (USD not adjusted for inflation) in damages. Tornadoes before February 1, 2007, are rated on the Fujita scale while tornadoes after February 1, 2007, are rated on the Enhanced Fujita scale. Records from before 1950 are based largely on the work of historical tornado expert Thomas P. Grazulis, who documents significant tornadoes: those rated F2 or higher or which caused at least one fatality. The most recent tornado in Cleveland County, rated EF0 tornado, was on June 6, 2025.

== Tornadoes ==
=== Before 1950 ===
- April 25, 1893: Two tornadoes caused damage in Norman and Moore. The first tornado, rated F2 by Grazulis, formed near Goldsby and destroyed 10 homes on the southern side of Norman. The second tornado “swept away at least 30 homes,” killing 31 people and injuring more than 100 others and was 1.25 miles (2.01 km) wide. Grazulis rated this tornado F4.
- April 8, 1896: A tornado, rated F3 by Grazulis, destroyed three homes and damaged three others in the small community of Linden east of Norman. Three people were injured. One house was reportedly blown completely off its foundation.
- May 16, 1910: A tornado "wrecked" four homes northeast of Norman, killing one person and injuring another. Grazulis assigned a rating of F2.
- March 28, 1924: A long-track, violent tornado traveled 50 miles (80 km) across Cleveland, Lincoln and Pottawatomie Counties, killing eight people and injuring 80. In Cleveland county, 25 farms suffered damage with seven people injured. The most significant damage was in Shawnee, where five people were killed and 200 homes were damaged or destroyed. Three people were killed in the destruction of a school south of Prague. Grazulis rated this tornado F4.
- June 9, 1937: A tornado impacted Canadian County and Cleveland County, moving from near Union City to west of Moore. It caused severe damage to at least eight farms, killing four people and injuring seven others. Grazulis conservatively assigned an F3 rating but stated it likely reached F4 intensity. This was likely either a tornado family or a multiple vortex tornado. One home was destroyed by another possible tornado south of Norman.
- September 26, 1945: A tornado, rated F2 by Grazulis, moved from south of Newcastle to near Norman. It destroyed several buildings, including a school at Newcastle and damaged planes at Naval Air Station Norman.
- April 30, 1949: A tornado, rated F3 by Grazulis, moved from near Stella to east of Meeker in Lincoln County, killing three people and injuring eight. The deaths were near Shawnee Lake and Meeker.

=== 1950–1999 ===
- February 2, 1951: A tornado rated F0 caused $250 (1951 USD) in damage.
- April 5, 1951: A tornado rated F2 caused $25,000 (1951 USD) in damage through Moore, Oklahoma.
- March 13, 1953: A strong F2 tornado, during the Tornado outbreak of March 12–15, 1953, moved through rural areas northwest of Etowah and south of Lake Thunderbird, destroying trees and badly demolishing a farmstead. There were no casualties although there was $2,500 (1953 USD) in damage.
- May 26, 1955: A tornado rated F1 during the 1955 Great Plains tornado outbreak caused $250 (1955 USD) in damage along a 11.6 miles (18.7 km) path through the county.
- April 28, 1956: A long-track F1 tornado impacted Grady County and McClain County before entering Cleveland County, causing $250 (1956 USD) in damage to Norman, Oklahoma.
- September 14, 1957: A short lived F4 tornado that impacted the southern portions of Cleveland County, causing $250,000 (1957 USD) in damage.
- April 28, 1960: Four F2 tornadoes impacted the county during the Tornado outbreak of April 28–30, 1960, causing $500,000 (1960 USD) in damage. The first and third tornado impacted Moore, Oklahoma damaging or destroying dozens of structures, while the second tornado destroyed an oil drilling rig in the eastern portion of the county. The fourth tornado was nearly half a mile wide and it killed three people, injured one other person, and caused $25,000 (1960 USD) in damage.
- May 4, 1960: An F2 tornado during the May 1960 tornado outbreak sequence impacted Noble, Oklahoma and caused $2,500 (1960 USD) in damage.
- May 5, 1960: Three F3 tornadoes impacted the southern and eastern portions of the county during the May 1960 tornado outbreak sequence, causing $750,000 (1960 USD) in damage.
- May 19, 1960: An extremely brief and small F2 tornado impacted the city of Moore, causing $25,000 (1960 USD) in damage. The National Weather Service's storm event details on this tornado mention the path length was less than 1 mile and the tornado had a width of 33 yards (30 m).
- May 6, 1961: An extremely brief F0 tornado impacted the city of Moore during the tornado outbreak sequence of May 3–9, 1961.
- May 7, 1961: An extremely brief F0 tornado impacted the city of Moore during the tornado outbreak sequence of May 3–9, 1961.
- April 27, 1962: A brief F0 tornado impacted the city of Norman, causing $25,000 (1962 USD) in damage.
- September 11, 1963: A brief F1 tornado touched down near Noble, causing $2,500 (1963 USD) in damage.
- April 3, 1964: An extremely brief F0 tornado impacted Norman.
- August 31, 1965: An extremely brief F0 tornado impacted Oklahoma City.
- May 17, 1966: An extremely brief F0 tornado impacted Norman, causing $2,500 (1966 USD) in damage.
- July 23, 1966: A brief F0 tornado occurred near Noble which was observed by oil rig workers.
- October 5, 1970: A strong F2 tornado occurred south of Slaughterville, causing $25,000 (1970 USD) in damage and leaving one person injured.
- June 4, 1973: An extremely brief F0 tornado impacted Norman, causing $2,500 (1973 USD) in damage.
- November 19, 1973: Two F3 tornadoes touch down in the county. The first tornado impacts downtown Moore, with winds up to 175 miles per hour (282 km/h), killing three people, injuring 28 others, and causing $2.5 million (1973 USD) in damage. The second tornado impacts northern Moore and the southern portions of Oklahoma City, causing an additional $2.5 million (1973 USD) in damage.
- February 18, 1974: An extremely brief “horseshoe-shaped” F0 tornado occurred and was photographed south of Slaughterville.
- August 1, 1974: A brief F1 tornado impacts the city of Moore, causing $250,000 (1974 USD) in damage along its 1 mile (1.6 km) path.
- March 10, 1977: A F1 tornado impacts downtown Noble, causing $250,000 (1977 USD) in damage as it destroyed two trailers, two outbuildings, and a barn. Five homes, two apartment buildings, and a school were also damaged by the tornado.
- May 21, 1977: A brief F0 tornado impacts the north side of Norman, causing $2,500 (1977 USD) in damage as it damaged outbuildings and homes.
- April 10, 1979: Two short-lived F2 tornadoes, during the 1979 Red River Valley tornado outbreak, occur south of Noble, with the first tornado causing $2,500 (1979 USD) in damage and the second tornado causing $25,000 (1979 USD) in damage.
- August 19, 1979: An extremely brief F0 tornado touched down near Noble, causing $2,500 (1979 USD) in damage as it destroyed a nearly completed barn.
- May 17, 1981: Two short-lived F1 tornadoes touch down in the county, with the first tornado impacting the south portion of Norman, close to the University of Oklahoma campus and the second tornado impacting south of Lake Thunderbird, causing $30 (1981 USD) in damage.
- June 30, 1981: An extremely brief F1 tornado touched down in Norman, causing $250,000 (1981 USD) in damage as it damaged a city block. A mechanic shop sustained $50,000 in damage and one mechanic was injured by this 7 yards (6.4 m) wide tornado that had a path of 0.3 miles (0.48 km). Despite the rating being an F1 tornado, the National Weather Service notes this tornado as a “significant tornado in Cleveland County”, meaning the rating may be at least an F2 on the Fujita scale.
- May 13, 1983: An extremely brief F0 tornado occurred north of Lexington.
- November 18, 1983: An extremely brief F1 tornado impacted Norman just east of the University of Oklahoma campus, causing an estimated $4,500 (1983 USD) in damage as it overturned two cars and uprooted large trees.
- March 28, 1988: An extremely brief F1 tornado impacted Oklahoma City, causing $250,000 (1988 USD) in damage.
- September 23, 1988: A F1 tornado occurred in Cleveland County causing damage along a path of 30 to 80 miles (48 to 129 km). Numerous outbuildings were destroyed and several homes were damaged. One two-story home had its roof completely removed by the tornado and it was shifted off its foundation.
- May 2, 1991: A brief F1 tornado impacted Moore, causing an estimated $350,000 (1991 USD) in damage.
- March 24, 1996: An F0 tornado occurs in Cleveland County, causing minimal damage.
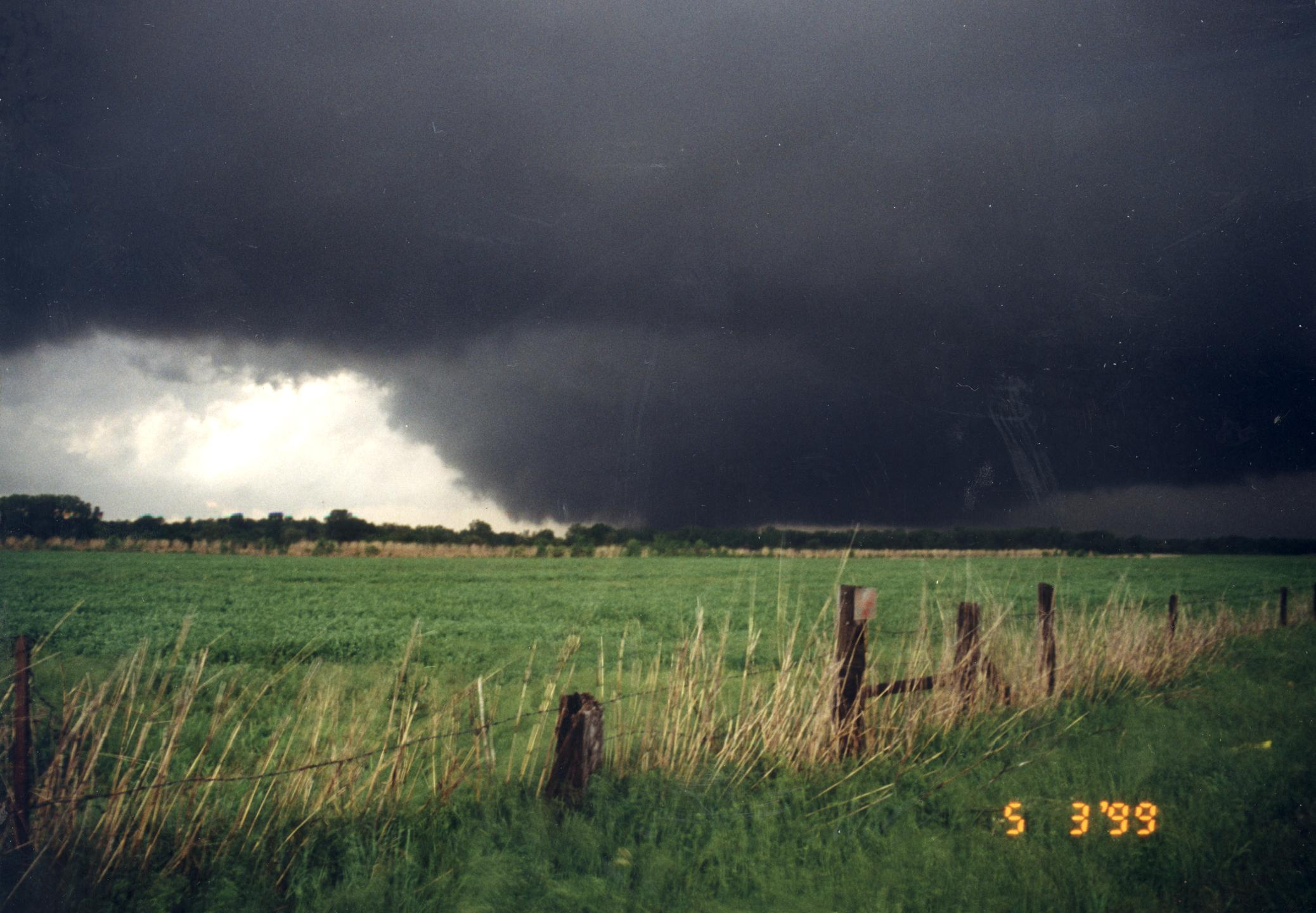
- 1999 Bridge Creek-Moore F5 tornado.
  May 3, 1999: Two tornadoes, during the 1999 Oklahoma tornado outbreak, impact Cleveland County. The first tornado, the 1999 Bridge Creek–Moore tornado was rated F5 as it caused significant damage across multiple counties in Oklahoma with winds peaking at 134.5 ± 10 m/s (301 ± 22 mph), the fastest ever recorded on Earth. In Cleveland County, the tornado was F5 intensity as it caused catastrophic damage to Moore. The tornado killed 36 people, injured 583 others, and caused $1 billion in damage (1999 USD), with Moore sustaining $450 million of that damage. The second tornado was a short-lived F0 tornado that caused $1,000 (1999 USD) in damage in the eastern portions of Cleveland County.
- May 4, 1999: An F0 tornado, during the 1999 Oklahoma tornado outbreak, touched down east of Moore and caused $1,000 (1999 USD) in damage.

=== 2000–present ===
- May 8, 2003: Two tornadoes impact Cleveland County. The first tornado was rated F0 and it caused $500,000 (2003 USD) in damage to the eastern side of Moore. The second tornado, the Moore—Oklahoma City tornado was rated F4 and caused $370 million (2003 USD) in damage across Cleveland County and Oklahoma County. F3 damage occurred in Cleveland County with the F4 damage occurring in Oklahoma County.
- June 9, 2004: A brief F0 tornado touched down near Lake Stanley Draper and caused $5,000 (2004 USD) in damage.
- May 7, 2008: An EF0 tornado, during the tornado outbreak sequence of May 7–15, 2008, impacted McClain County and Cleveland County south of Norman, causing $25,000 (2008 USD) in damage.
- May 13, 2009: A brief EF0 tornado occurred near Lake Stanley Draper, where it damaged trees and caused an unknown amount of damage to a boat dock and small structures.
- June 12, 2009: A low-end EF1 tornado impacted the eastern portion of Norman, damaging numerous trees and a few homes sustained an unknown amount of roof damage.
- May 10, 2010: Seven tornadoes, during the tornado outbreak of May 10–13, 2010, impacted Cleveland County. The first tornado, the Moore–Choctaw tornado, was an EF4 tornado that impacted Norman and Moore at EF3 intensity, before continuing into Oklahoma County at EF4 intensity. The second tornado was an EF1 tornado that caused damage in Moore. The third tornado caused minor roof and tree damage at EF1 intensity just east of Moore. The fourth tornado, the Norman–Little Axe, Oklahoma tornado, rated EF4, that impacted the southern portion of Norman before moving into Pottawatomie County. The tornado touched down a few hundred yards away from the National Weather Center located on the University of Oklahoma campus. The fifth tornado was an anticyclonic tornado that impacted the southern portion of Norman, near the University of Oklahoma campus at EF1 intensity. The sixth tornado impacted the eastern portion of Cleveland County at EF2 intensity, before moving into Pottawatomie County one minute before the Norman–Little Axe EF4 moved into Pottawatomie County. The seventh tornado caused only tree damage at EF0 intensity in the southeastern portion of Cleveland County.
- May 24, 2011: The Chickasha–Blanchard–Newcastle tornado was an EF4 tornado that impacted Grady County, McClain County, and the western portion of Cleveland County. The tornado was dissipating as it entered Cleveland County to the east of Moore, so only some minor EF0 damage to trees, barns, and outbuildings occurred in the county.
- April 13, 2012: A 600 yards (550 m) wide EF1 tornado, during the tornado outbreak of April 13–16, 2012, impacted downtown Norman, injuring 20 people, causing minor damage to buildings and damage to numerous trees and power lines.

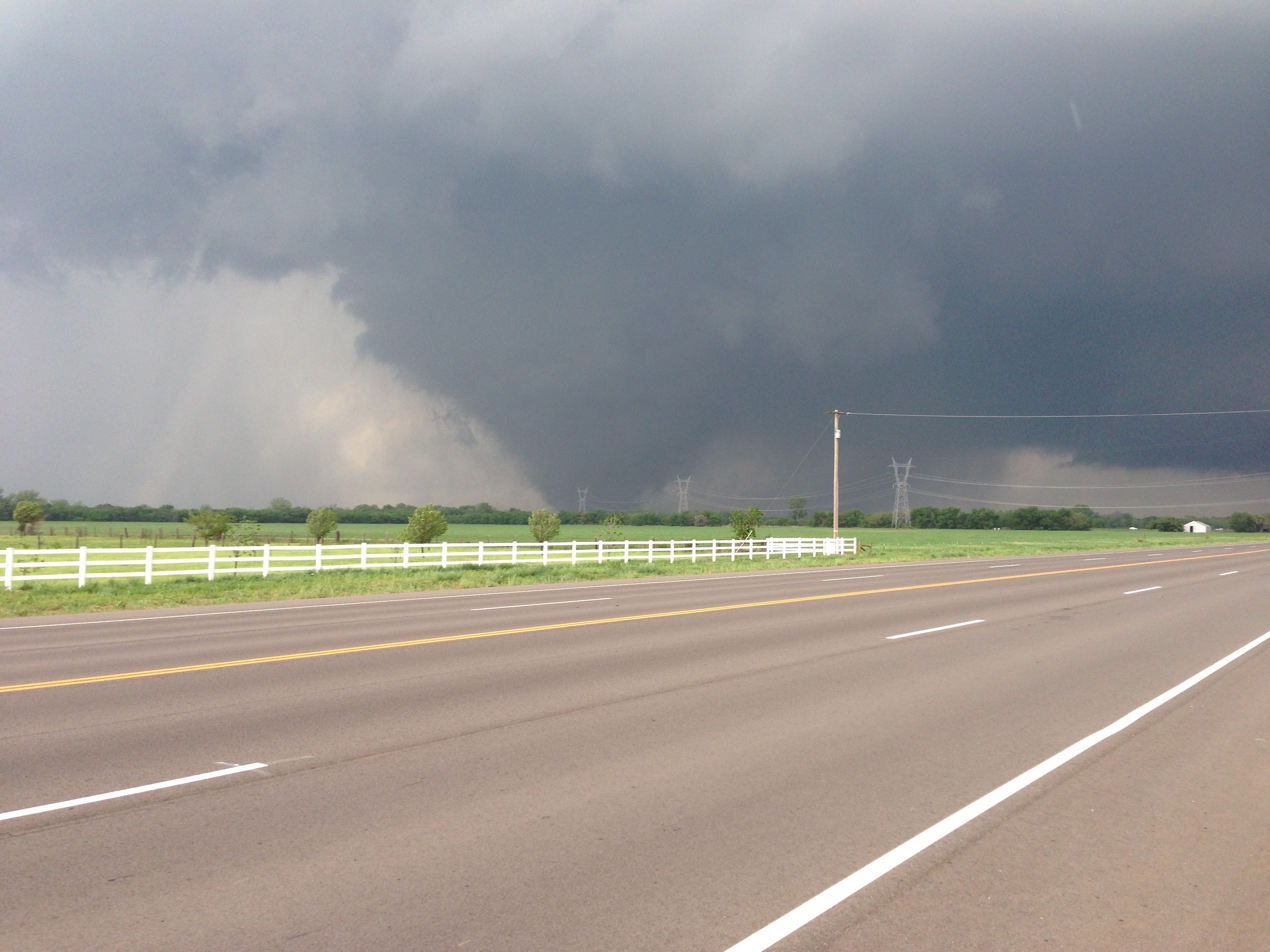
The 2013 Moore tornado approaching the city of Moore.

- May 19, 2013: The Lake Thunderbird–Bethel Acres-Shawnee tornado was an EF4 tornado that impacted the eastern portion of the county near Lake Thunderbird, significantly damaging numerous homes at EF3 intensity. The tornado then moved into Pottawatomie County and grew to EF4 intensity as it continued damaging or destroying homes and mobile homes.
- May 20, 2013: The 2013 Moore tornado was an EF5 tornado that caused catastrophic damage to the city of Moore. This tornado damaged or destroyed hundreds of structures, killed 24 people, and injured 212 others along a 17 miles (27 km) path. This tornado caused an estimated $2 billion (2013 USD) in damage.
- May 29, 2013: An extremely brief EF1 tornado, during the tornado outbreak of May 26–31, 2013, that caused $40,000 (2013 USD) in damage a single home in Norman.
- May 31, 2013: A brief EF1 tornado, during the tornado outbreak of May 26–31, 2013, impacted the area around South Lakes Park causing $100,000 (2013 USD) in damage to several homes, trees, and power lines.
- March 25, 2015: An EF2 tornado impacted southern portions of Oklahoma City and portions of Moore, injuring seven people. The tornado had a discontinuous path of 11.21 miles (18.04 km) where numerous homes and business sustained minor to moderate damage. This tornado caused $50 million (2015 USD) in damage.
- May 5, 2015: Two tornadoes, an EF0 and an EF1, impacted the county during the tornado outbreak sequence of May 5–10, 2015. The first tornado caused only damage to trees and fences. The second tornado impacted the northern portions of Norman and southern portions of Moore, damaging numerous homes, trees, and power lines. HVAC equipment was damaged and light poles were downed at the Norman Healthplex hospital.
- May 19, 2015: An EF0 tornado occurred northeast of Lexington and procured no known damage.
- May 9, 2016: An EFU tornado occurred near Lake Thunderbird.
- October 21, 2017: A short-lived EF0 that impacted the southern portion of Norman near the University of Oklahoma, causing tree damage and $2,000 (2017 USD) in damage to fences.
- May 2, 2018: Two tornadoes, an EF1 and an EF0, impacted the county during a tornado outbreak. The EF1 tornado impacted Norman, causing mostly tree damage and $10,000 (2018 USD) in damage to a home and an outbuilding that experienced significant roof damage. The EF0 tornado caused only tree damage north of Lexington.
- October 9, 2018: Two short-lived tornadoes, an EF0 and an EF1, impacted the county east of Norman and Moore and caused $95,000 (2018 USD) in damage. A few structures sustained damage with one sustaining significant roof damage and numerous trees were damaged or snapped.
- May 21, 2019: Four tornadoes impacted the county during the tornado outbreak of May 20–23, 2019, with two rated EF0 and two rated EF1 that caused $10,000 (2019 USD) in damage. The first tornado, rated EF0, impacted Noble and the other three tornadoes impacted east of Norman with all four tornadoes causing mostly tree damage with damage to a barn and an outbuilding.
- May 25, 2019: An extremely brief EF0 tornado during the tornado outbreak of May 25–30, 2019 damaged a few structures, causing $10,000 (2019 USD) in damage and the tornado damaged multiple trees east of Norman.
- May 4, 2020: A brief EF1 tornado east of Lexington damaged multiple trees and the roof of a mobile home, causing $20,000 (2020 USD) in damage.
- July 11, 2020: An extremely brief EF0 tornado damaged numerous trees and the roof of a home. This tornado was embedded within the large area of damaging winds and NWS meteorologists observed a narrow path of enhanced damage with evidence of a convergence and rotation to determine this was a tornado.
- October 26, 2021: An EF1 tornado that damaged the roofs of two barns, damaged the soffit to a carport at a home and damaged trees along a 6.6 miles (10.6 km) path, which started in Norman. $25,000 (2021 USD) in damage occurred from this tornado.
- December 13, 2022: An EF2 tornado, during the Tornado outbreak of December 12–15, 2022, impacted the town of Wayne in McClain County before briefly crossing into Cleveland County.
- February 26, 2023: An EF2 tornado impacted Norman injuring 12 people during the February 2023 derecho and tornado outbreak. The tornado would cause $50.2 million (2023 USD) in damage. Another tornado touched down on the NE edge of the county, it would be rated EF1.
- April 19, 2023: An EF0 tornado occurred in the northern portion of the county, before moving into Oklahoma County, where it impacts Tinker Air Force Base. A second tornado, an EF2 occurred north of Etowah.
- April 27, 2024: An EF1 tornado formed east of Interstate 35 in Norman, causing minor damage to University of Oklahoma Westheimer Airport, before lifting 7 minutes later. Part of the Tornado outbreak sequence of April 25–28, 2024.
- May 6, 2024: An EF1 tornado touched down east of Will Rogers World Airport in far northern Cleveland County, causing minor damage to southern Oklahoma City across its 5-mile path. Part of the Tornado outbreak of May 6–9, 2024.
- November 3, 2024: An intense EF3 tornado occurred an hour after midnight in southeastern Oklahoma City where several homes lost roofs, with major damage occurring across several neighborhoods. An EF0 tornado also occurred in western Norman, causing minor damage. Part of the Tornado outbreak of November 2–5, 2024.
- November 4, 2024: A storm chaser observed a weak EF0 tornado that did minor damage to a shed to the east of Lexington. Part of the Tornado outbreak of November 2–5, 2024.
- June 6, 2025: A high-end EF0 tornado inflicted some roof damage to a home east of Lexington.
- January 8, 2026: An EF-1 tornado started in another county but crossed into Cleveland significantly damaging an outbuilding north of Lexington before dissipating shortly after crossing US 77. An EF0 tornado damaged to houses in Norman. Later that day, an EF-1 touched down in Stella, causing damage before crossing into a different county.

== See also ==
- List of Rhode Island tornadoes
- List of Connecticut tornadoes
- Tornado outbreak of May 18–21, 2013
