= Tornado outbreak of March 12–15, 1953 =

Weather event in the United States

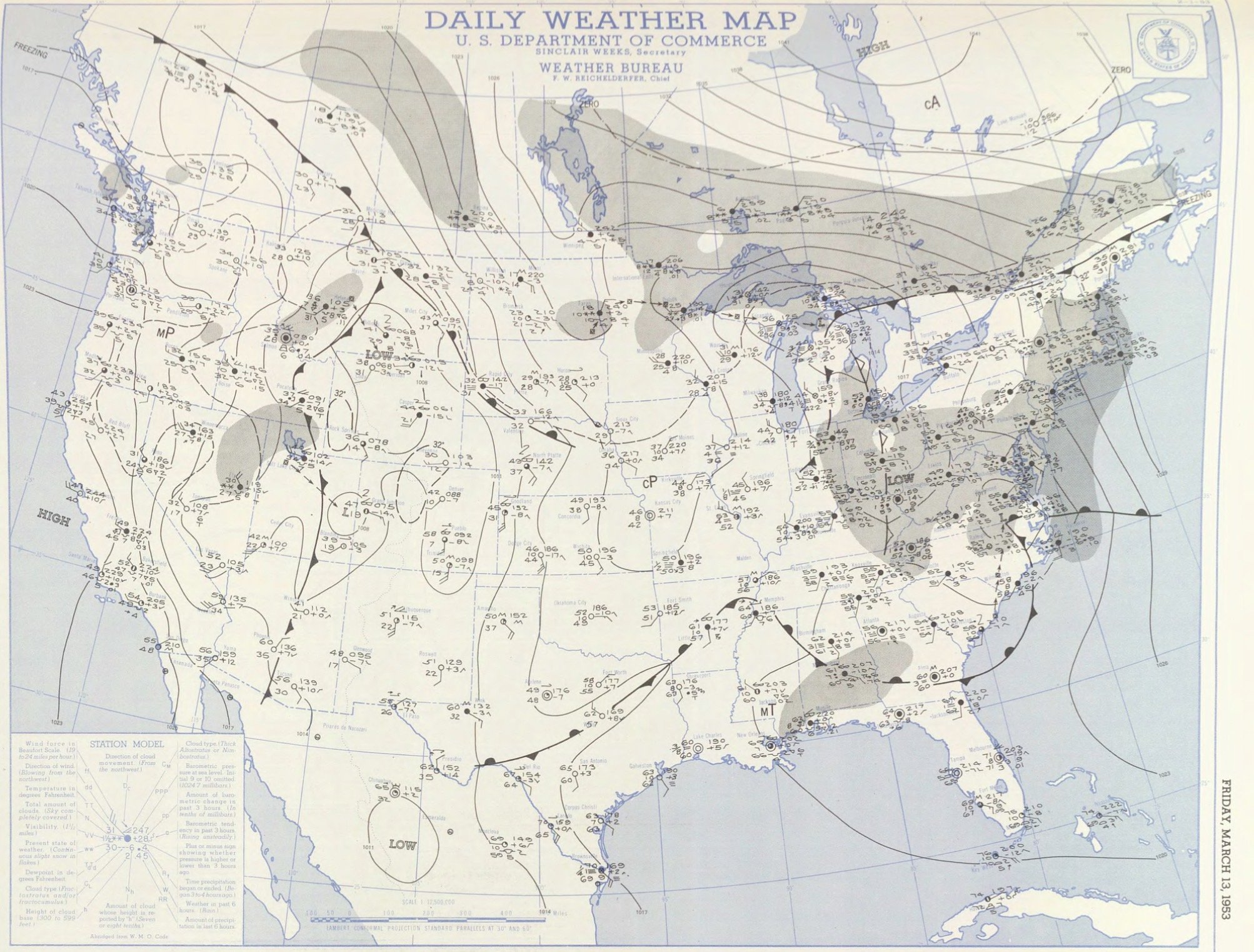
- Surface weather analysis on March 13, showing the low pressure system over the Great Lakes

Meteorological history
- Formed: March 12, 1953
- Dissipated: March 15, 1953

Tornado outbreak
- Tornadoes: 23
- Max. rating: F4 tornado
- Duration: 3 days, 4 hours, 20 minutes
- Largest hail: 3.25 inches (8.3 cm); Dyersburg, Tennessee on March 14.

Overall effects
- Casualties: 21 fatalities (+1 non-tornadic), 72 injuries (+4 non-tornadic)
- Damage: $6.835 million (1953 USD) $82.3 million (2025 USD)
- Areas affected: Great Plains, Mississippi Valley, Southeastern United States
- Part of the tornado outbreaks of 1953

A widespread and deadly tornado outbreak affected the Great Plains, Mississippi Valley, and Southeast between March 12–15, 1953. At least 23 tornadoes were confirmed with the strongest one reaching F4 intensity and striking O'Brien, Texas on Friday the 13th. Overall, 21 people were killed, 72 others were injured, and damages were estimated at $6.835 million (1953 USD). (Note: An outbreak is generally defined as a group of at least six tornadoes (the number sometimes varies slightly according to local climatology) with no more than a six-hour gap between individual tornadoes. An outbreak sequence, prior to (after) the start of modern records in 1950, is defined as a period of no more than two (one) consecutive days without at least one significant (F2 or stronger) tornado.) There were additional casualties from non-tornadic events as well.

== Meteorological synopsis ==
Unusually warm weather surged into the Eastern United States on March 12. A jet stream dip, as well as the presence of a southeastward-moving surface low pressure system that had formed over Montana on March 12 led to creation of widespread strong to severe thunderstorms throughout the region along an unusual eastward moving warm front and dryline on March 13. Starting in Central Plains, this area of severe and tornadic thunderstorms pushed eastward, producing damaging winds, large hail, and tornadoes to a total of 16 states before the low, which had turned northeastward, moved into Wisconsin and was replaced by a surface anti-cyclone on March 15.

== Confirmed tornadoes ==
Confirmed tornadoes by Fujita rating
FU	F0	F1	F2	F3	F4	F5	Total
0	1	4	11	6	1	0	23

=== March 12 event ===
List of confirmed tornadoes – Thursday, March 12, 1953 (Note: All dates are based on the local time zone where the tornado touched down; however, all times are in Coordinated Universal Time and dates are split at midnight CST/CDT for consistency.) (Note: Prior to 1994, only the average widths of tornado paths were officially listed.)
F#	Location	County / Parish	State	Start Coord.	Time (UTC)	Path length	Max. width	Summary
F2	Northeastern Carthage	Panola	TX	32.17°N 94.33°W	22:30–?	2 mi (3.2 km)	80 yd (73 m)	A tornado accompanied by non-damaging moderate hail struck residential areas on the northeastern side of Carthage. Homes lost their roofs, a garage was wrecked, and buildings and vehicles were damaged. Two people were injured and damages totaled $25,000 (1953 USD).

=== March 13 event ===
List of confirmed tornadoes – Friday, March 13, 1953
F#	Location	County / Parish	State	Start Coord.	Time (UTC)	Path length	Max. width	Summary
F4	SSE of Jud to O'Brien to E of Knox City	Haskell, Knox	TX	33.28°N 99.95°W	20:00–22:15	13.9 mi (22.4 km)	50 yd (46 m)	17 deaths – See section on this tornado – A total of 25 people were injured and losses totaled $5 million (1953 USD).
F2	SSE of Rush Springs to SSW of Middleberg	Grady	OK	34.77°N 97.95°W	23:15–23:35	23.6 mi (38.0 km)	100 yd (91 m)	This long-tracked, strong tornado moved through a good portion of Grady County causing major damage, although most of the property damage came out of the southern and eastern portions of Rush Springs, where marble to golf-ball sized hail also caused damage. There, a total of 81 homes incurred damage, two of which were unroofed. A quonset hut also sustained damage, the first known occurrence of this type of structure being damaged by wind, although none of the cattle inside were injured. One person in town was thrown 300 feet (91 m) and injured as well. The tornado briefly lifted after moving away from Rush Springs before being observed again ripping up fences and trees near Blanchard, although no buildings were hit there. Losses totaled $25,000 (1953 USD).
F3	Bradley	Grady	OK	34.88°N 97.7°W	00:19–00:29	1 mi (1.6 km)	100 yd (91 m)	1 death – An intense tornado struck Bradley, destroying the business district of the town. In all, eight homes, a telephone office, and the local post office were destroyed. A high school along its with gymnasium as well as 15 other homes were wrecked or damaged as well. Four barns were also unroofed, destroyed, or otherwise damaged. Eight people were injured and damages totaled $250,000 (1953 USD).
F2	N of Washington	McClain	OK	35.07°N 97.48°W	00:45–01:00	2 mi (3.2 km)	100 yd (91 m)	A strong tornado unroofed a school and multiple homes. A stone structure and cotton gin were destroyed, and 30 other structures sustained damage. Two people were injured and damages totaled $250,000 (1953 USD). Advance warning allowed many residents to shelter in their basements or cellars before the tornado hit.
F2	Eastern Norman	Cleveland	OK	35.18°N 97.25°W	01:30–?	1.3 mi (2.1 km)	250 yd (230 m)	A strong tornado moved through rural areas northwest of Etowah and south of Lake Thunderbird, destroying trees and badly demolishing a farmstead. There were no casualties although there was $2,500 (1953 USD) in damage. Grazulis did not list this tornado as an F2 or stronger.
F3	NE of Burneyville to Earl to NNE of Tishomingo	Love, Marshall, Carter, Johnston	OK	33.92°N 97.27°W	01:30–03:00	45.3 mi (72.9 km)	200 yd (180 m)	2 deaths – A long-tracked, intense tornado, which was likely a tornado family, started just north of the Red River and moved northeastward unroofing several buildings on a farmstead. It lifted for a little while, passing over Lake Murray before coming down just southeast of Durwood 3 miles (4.8 km) east of Dickson, where it quickly reached its peak intensity and killed two people. It heavily damaged or destroyed 11 more farmsteads, including two that sustained high-end F3-level damage, as it moved through Earl, which is just northwest of Mannsville. Only pieces of some walls were left standing on some homesites and a man was seriously injured after he was thrown out of the storm cave he was in while trying to hold the door the closed. The tornado then passed between Troy and Ravia causing some additional damage before dissipating. There was $50,000 (1953 USD) in damage and 11 people were injured. The tornado may have actually started at 23:30 UTC, two hours earlier than officially documented. Heavy rain and hail also accompanied the tornado and 2.5 inches (64 mm) of rain was recorded in Wapanucka after the tornado dissipated.
F2	NW of Monroe	Le Flore	OK	35°N 94.53°W	04:00–?	0.1 mi (0.16 km)	100 yd (91 m)	A brief but strong tornado struck a farmstead on the northwest side of Monroe. A barn and two chicken houses were destroyed, injuring a cow and killing 30-35 chickens, including some that had their feathers blown off. A farmhouse on the property was also shifted 5 feet (1.5 m) off of its foundation. There were no casualties, but $2,500 (1953 USD) in damage was inflicted. Grazulis did not list this tornado as an F2 or stronger.

=== March 14 event ===
List of confirmed tornadoes – Saturday, March 14, 1953
F#	Location	County / Parish	State	Start Coord.	Time (UTC)	Path length	Max. width	Summary
F3	Chismville to Northwestern Clarksville to W of Strawberry	Logan, Franklin, Johnson	AR	35.22°N 93.95°W	06:30–?	40.1 mi (64.5 km)	880 yd (800 m)	A large, long-tracked, intense tornado, which may have been a tornado family, first touched down in Chismville, damaging five homes and destroying a church. It then weakened and skipped northeastward through rural areas and forest, passing between Caulksville and Carbon City before moving through Gray Rock and Kalamazoo. After crossing the Arkansas River west of Lake Dardanelle and hitting Hinkle, the tornado touched down solidly and intensified again as it moved through Shady Grove and struck the northwest side of Clarksville destroying three airplanes and four hangars at the Clarksville Airport and damaging a tile factory. It then moved through Ludwig before dissipating west of Strawberry. Considerable tree damage occurred along the path as well. Despite occurring in the early morning hours, there were no casualties, although there was $250,000 (1953 USD) in damage. Grazulis classified this tornado as an F2.
F2	W of Mountain View to Melbourne to LaCrosse to Myron	Stone, Izard	AR	35.88°N 92.23°W	06:30–07:00	36.2 mi (58.3 km)	333 yd (304 m)	See section on this tornado – There was $250,000 (1953 USD) in damage.
F3	Sills to Mill Creek to Dover	Yell, Pope	AR	35.28°N 93.28°W	07:30–?	12.2 mi (19.6 km)	880 yd (800 m)	This large tornado touched down in Sills east of Delaware on the south shore of the Arkansas River before immediately crossing it as a tornadic waterspout, clipping the Delaware Park Public Use Area in Riverside as well as Goose Island as it moved north-northeast. The tornado then made landfall south of London, turned northeast, and caused it worst damage as it passed near Bunker Hill and Mill Creek, damaging or destroying numerous homes, barns, and outbuildings. It then moved through more rural areas before moving into the southwest side of Dover. The tornado then dissipated in the central part of Dover shortly thereafter. In all, 18 homes, two barns, and many outbuildings were destroyed and 56 other homes were damaged. Unlike the previous early morning tornadoes, seven people were injured, two seriously, and there was $5,000 (1953 USD) in damage.
F2	NE of Altitude	Prentiss	MS	34.67°N 88.43°W	20:30–?	3.3 mi (5.3 km)	10 yd (9.1 m)	1 death – A strong tornado touched down east of Altitude and caused major damage as it moved northeastward through the Hills Chapel settlement along MS 364. Two homes were destroyed, one of which caught fire, and eight farms and six other homes were damaged. Losses totaled $25,000 (1953 USD).
F1	E of Dameron	Lincoln	MO	39.22°N 90.75°W	23:00–?	0.2 mi (0.32 km)	10 yd (9.1 m)	A building under construction northeast of Elsberry was destroyed, injuring a man working inside and leaving behind $25,000 (1953 USD) in damage. A tree also fell on a car while other buildings sustained roof damage, although this was not likely related to the tornado.
F2	WNW of Stanton to Southeastern Brownsville to Wellwood to Poplar Corner	Haywood	TN	35.47°N 89.45°W	23:45–00:05	24.8 mi (39.9 km)	33 yd (30 m)	A strong tornado accompanied by small hail touched down west-northwest of Bird Bower and tracked northeastward through Southeastern Brownsville before passing through of Wellwood and Poplar Corner and dissipating. In all, two homes and seven farm buildings were destroyed while three homes and 14 other farm buildings were damaged. Eight people were injured, 10 families were impacted, and losses totaled $25,000 (1953 USD).
F2	SSE of Deanburg to Henderson to Middle Fork to Stegall	Chester, Henderson	TN	35.37°N 88.78°W	00:00–00:18	24 mi (39 km)	100 yd (91 m)	A strong tornado touched down in the Chickasaw State Park northeast of Silerton and moved northeastward. It passed directly through Sanford Hill and Henderson, damaging or destroying 60 homes and other buildings. Losses totaled $50,000 (1953 USD) and two people were injured in Henderson County. In all, three homes and 17 farm buildings were destroyed while 21 other homes and 19 other buildings were damaged. This tornado struck areas that had been hit just under one year earlier by a longer-tracked F4 tornado.
F1	N of Dyersburg	Dyer	TN	36.08°N 89.38°W	00:30–?	0.2 mi (0.32 km)	10 yd (9.1 m)	A brief tornado moved through northern side of Dyersburg, causing $25,000 (1953 USD) in damage. Most of the damage from the storm actually came from hail up to 3.25 inches (8.3 cm) in diameter, which damaged roofs in Newbern and Dyersburg.
F1	Northern Ripley	Lauderdale	TN	35.75°N 89.53°W	01:00–?	0.2 mi (0.32 km)	10 yd (9.1 m)	This brief, but destructive tornado hit areas just north of Downtown Ripley. One home and two farm buildings were destroyed, eight other homes were damaged, and losses totaled $25,000 (1953 USD). Grazulis classified this tornado as an F2.
F3	Neely to Jackson to Lawrence to ESE of Spring Creek	Madison	TN	35.53°N 88.97°W	01:30–02:00	24.7 mi (39.8 km)	100 yd (91 m)	An intense tornado touched down east of Denmark and moved northeastward through the northwest side of Downtown Jackson as well as Lawrence before dissipating well north of Claybrook. Four homes and 12 farm buildings destroyed with five other homes and five more farm buildings were damaged. Three people were injured, 10 families were impacted, and total losses reached $25,000 (1953 USD). Grazulis classified this tornado as an F2.
F2	NE of Oakdale to Nashville to SSW of Greendale	Washington, Jefferson, Marion	IL	38.4°N 89.47°W	02:00–?	42.3 mi (68.1 km)	200 yd (180 m)	A strong, long-tracked tornado caused major damage as it just barely missed several towns along its path with the heaviest damage occurring in Washington County. One home and several other structures were destroyed or damaged. Losses totaled $250,000 (1953 USD).
F2	E of Martin	Weakley	TN	36.33°N 88.77°W	03:15–?	0.3 mi (0.48 km)	600 yd (550 m)	A brief but large, strong tornado struck a neighborhood east of Martin. Six farm buildings were destroyed while 11 other farm buildings and five homes were damaged. One person was injured and losses totaled $25,000 (1953 USD).
F0	New Goshen	Vigo	IN	39.58°N 87.47°W	04:00–?	0.1 mi (0.16 km)	100 yd (91 m)	A brief, funnel-less, weak tornado just missed New Goshen, lifting and carrying a garage off its foundation, twisting trees, and causing only $250 (1953 USD) in damage. A characteristic "roar" heard by witnesses helped confirm that the event was indeed a tornado.
F1	N of Bridgeton	Parke	IN	39.65°N 87.18°W	04:00–?	0.1 mi (0.16 km)	100 yd (91 m)	A brief tornado embedded within an area of straight-line winds, hail, heavy rain, and lightning just missed Bridgeton, touching down just north of Big Raccoon Creek and west-northwest of Bridgeton Covered Bridge. The tornado briefly moved northeast through farmlands north of the town in the direction of Snow Hill before dissipating. A house was moved off its foundation with some of its shutters and shingles ripped off and thrown some distance away. Damage from the tornado, which was not immediately confirmed at the time it occurred, was estimated at only $30 (1953 USD) as 95% of the damage came from the wind.

=== March 15 event ===
List of confirmed tornadoes – Sunday, March 15, 1953
F#	Location	County / Parish	State	Start Coord.	Time (UTC)	Path length	Max. width	Summary
F3	ESE of Bailey to Northern Wilson to Macclesfield to Crisp	Nash, Wilson, Edgecombe	NC	35.77°N 78.1°W	02:00–02:50	30.1 mi (48.4 km)	27 yd (25 m)	See section on this tornado – One person was injured and damage was estimated at $250,060 (1953 USD).

=== Jud–O'Brien–Southeastern Knox City, Texas ===
Jud–O'Brien– Southeastern Knox City, Texas
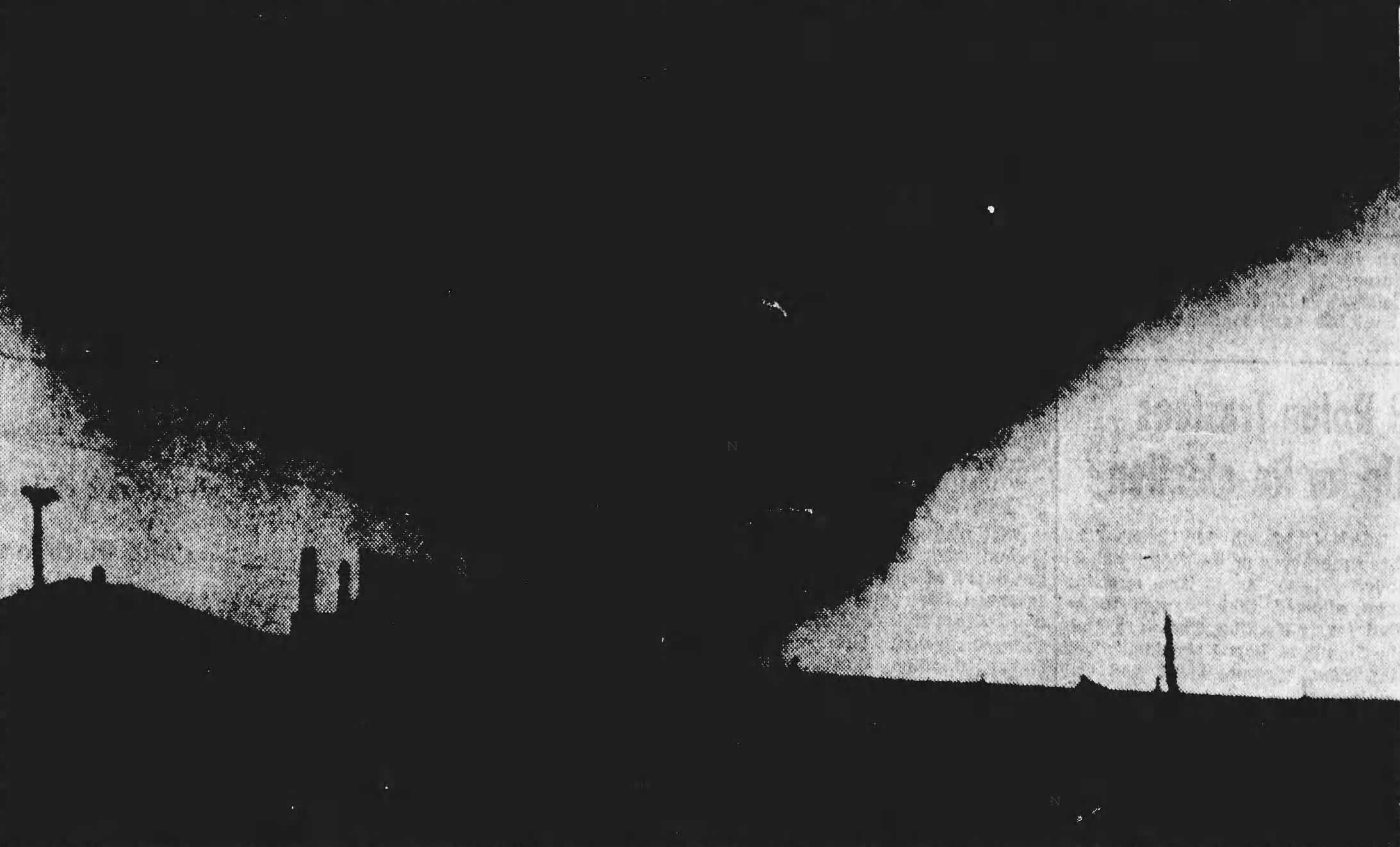
- The tornado between Jud and O'Brien

Tornado outbreak
- Max. rating: F4 tornado

Overall effects
- Fatalities: 17
- Injuries: 25
- Damage: $5 million (1953 USD)

This violent F4 tornado first touched down in Jud and almost immediately became violent. Five people died when their home in the town was obliterated. The tornado then swept northeast, passing west of Rochester, where four more people were killed in another destroyed home. The tornado then continued through open terrain before moving directly through O'Brien, causing catastrophic damage and three more fatalities. Throughout Haskell County, the tornado killed 12, injured 20, and caused $2.5 million in damage.

The tornado then moved into Knox County, where some of the most intense damage occurred. It struck several neighborhoods in Southeastern Knox City, which sustained almost total destruction. Many homes were swept away along an eight block stretch through the city and in rural areas nearby while many others were destroyed or damaged. In all, 139 homes in Knox City were damaged or destroyed, killing five and injuring another five. As the tornado moved out the east side of town, it quickly weakened and ultimately dissipated shortly thereafter. Along with the casualties, there was $2.5 million in damage in Knox County.

The tornado was on the ground for at least 15 minutes, traveled 13.9 miles (22.4 km), was 50 yards (46 m) wide, and caused $5 million in damage. (Note: The CDNS report says the tornado traveled 18 miles (29 km) and was 500 yards (460 m) wide).) Along its path, the tornado destroyed 33 homes, damaged 139 others, and destroyed 43 other buildings. A total of 17 people were killed and 25 (possibly 60) others were injured, all severely.

=== Allison–Melbourne–LaCrosse–Myron, Arkansas ===
Allison–Melbourne–LaCrosse–Myron, Arkansas
F2 tornado
- on the Fujita scale

Overall effects
- Damage: $250,000 (1953 USD)

Around the same time the F3 tornado touched down well to its southwest, this second long-tracked, strong F2 tornado touched down west of Mountain View just southeast of the joint towns of Newnata and Big Springs, which sustained some damage. It moved northeast, striking the joint rural community of Allison and Sylamore along the White River and inflicting moderate damage. The tornado then continued northeast over the Brandenburg Mountain, just missing Lone Star before moving directly through Melbourne, where moderate to severe damage was inflicted to multiple structures and homes. It then moved out of Melbourne and hit the northwest side of Lacrosse, where more damage was observed. The tornado then moved back into rural areas of Izard County and reached its peak intensity as it passed southeast of Franklin and into Myron. It caused severe damage and destroyed multiple structures before it abruptly weakened and dissipated as it was approaching Ash Flat from the southwest.

The tornado was on the ground for at least 30 minutes, traveled 36.2 miles (58.3 km), was 333 yards (304 m) wide, and caused $250,000 (1953 USD) in damage. A total of 22 homes were extensively damaged or destroyed and three barns were destroyed as well. Similar to the previous tornado however, there were no casualties from this early-morning tornado.

=== Bailey–Northern Wilson–Macclesfield–Crisp, North Carolina ===
Bailey–Northern Wilson–Macclesfield–Crisp, North Carolina
F3 tornado
- on the Fujita scale

Overall effects
- Injuries: 1
- Damage: $250,060 (1953 USD)

This narrow but long-tracked, intense F3 tornado touched down southeast of Bailey in Nash County and moved southeast, damaging five homes and 10 other buildings with seven families being affected. As it moved into Wilson County west-southwest of Sims, it turned east and strengthened as it moved towards the northern side of Wilson. It then struck several neighborhoods there, causing heavy damage, especially on east side of the area where it reached its peak strength. A total of 16 homes were severely damaged, a school sustained so much damage ($30,000) that it was forced to close, one person was injured and 16 families were impacted. Local officials stated that it was the worst storm to hit the area since 1929. Moving east, the tornado exited Wilson into rural areas of Wilson County damaging mostly farmlands. It then moved through the rural community of Wilbanks, damaging the homes in the area. The tornado then began to weaken as it moved into Edgecombe County and directly into Macclesfield, causing severe damage. The tornado then moved into Crisp, causing some additional damage before dissipating east of town. Damage along this final portion included the destruction of a home and another building with damage being inflicted to three other homes and four families were affected as well.

The tornado was on the ground for at least 50 minutes, traveled 30.1 miles (48.4 km), was 27 yards (25 m) wide, and caused $250,060 (1953 USD) in damage, with $70,000 coming from Wilson alone. It caused no fatalities, but did injure one person. Grazulis classified this tornado as an F2.

== Non-tornadic impacts ==
On March 12, small, but abundant 1/4 in (0.64 cm) hail caused heavy damage to planes at the Little Rock Municipal Airport while also damaging a commercial greenhouse. The next day, Oklahoma was pelted by numerous severe thunderstorms that produced considerable hail and wind damage across mainly the southern and eastern portions of the state. In Elmer many roofs and windows were damaged, a barn was blown down, and the roof of an abandoned school was blown off. Even worst damage occurred in Lawton, where high winds and 1–2-inch-diameter (2.5–5.1 cm) hail damaged every roof, broke many windows, and dented many vehicles in town while nearby Fort Sill saw extensive damage to airplanes and buildings. Losses in the area alone was estimated at $2 million (1953 USD). The town of Red Oak also suffered heavy wind damage while multiple roads and bridges in the area were washed out by heavy rainfall as well. On the cold side of the system, heavy snow caused a man to die of exposure after he got lost near Esterbrook, Wyoming.

The severe weather outbreak in Oklahoma continued into the early-morning hours of March 14 with lightning striking and damaging church in Tulsa. By that time, the outbreak had begun to shift into Arkansas with severe thunderstorms inflicting hail damage to numerous areas Van Buren County. That afternoon, more hail damage was inflicted to roofs and neon signs in Harrisburg. Widespread hail and wind damage also occurred across Illinois and Missouri while a tenant home in the Lepanto-Rivervale, Arkansas area was destroyed by strong winds. That night, a thundersquall caused some wind damage in Jefferson Parish, Louisiana while a barn with stored grain in Boone Township, Indiana was destroyed by high winds as well, although a tornado may have been involved. On the south side of Wayne, Arkansas, a severe storm also caused wind damage to a drive-in theatre and hail damage to several car.

Early on March 15, a lightning strike sparked a fire that destroyed a barn and stored crops and killed livestock near Granville, Ohio. That night in Fort Meade, Maryland, lightning struck a home, damaging two rooms, with the family of four inside being treated for shock. Later, another severe storm in Hopewell, Virginia partially ripped the roof off of a radio station, buckled rafters at a partially constructed church, which also saw its basement roof crack open, damaged nearly 100 homes damaged, caused minor power failures, and uprooted trees. Farther north, a glaze of ice due to freezing rain disrupted 63 long-distance phone circuits in North-Central Wisconsin.

== See also ==
- List of North American tornadoes and tornado outbreaks
- 2011 Super Outbreak
- Tornado outbreak of April 27–30, 2014
