= Mill Creek, Arkansas =

Mill Creek, Arkansas may refer to:

- Mill Creek, Pope County, Arkansas
- Mill Creek, Sebastian County, Arkansas, a place in Arkansas
