= Moore, Oklahoma tornado =

The phrase "Moore, Oklahoma tornado" may refer to the:

- 1999 Bridge Creek–Moore tornado
- 2003 Moore–Choctaw tornado
- 2010 Moore–Choctaw–Harrah tornado
- 2013 Moore tornado

See List of Cleveland County, Oklahoma tornadoes for other tornadoes that have impacted Moore, Oklahoma.
