= John Thrasher Homestead =

Historic house in Arkansas, United States

- U.S. National Register of Historic Places
- Location within Arkansas Location within the United States
- Nearest city: Midway, Arkansas
- Coordinates: 35°30′5″N 91°36′50″W
- Area: less than one acre
- Built: 1885
- Architect: John Thrasher
- Architectural style: Vernacular double-pen
- MPS: White County MPS
- NRHP reference No.: 91001362
- Added to NRHP: July 23, 1992

The John Thrasher Homestead was a historic homestead in rural White County, Arkansas. It was located north of Bald Knob and southwest of the crossroads hamlet of Midway, down a lane west of United States Route 167. It was a 1 1/2-story saddlebag frame house, originally built as a single-pen structure with exterior chimney c. 1885. This was later enlarged by enclosing the chimney and adding a second pen on its other side. It was, despite deteriorating condition when surveyed in 1992, one of the finest examples of this type of design in the county.

The house was listed on the National Register of Historic Places in 1992. It has been listed as destroyed in the Arkansas Historic Preservation Program database.

== See also ==
- National Register of Historic Places listings in White County, Arkansas
