= Blunt House Livestock Barn =

- U.S. National Register of Historic Places
- Location within Arkansas Location within the United States
- Nearest city: Midway, Arkansas
- Coordinates: 35°31′0″N 91°38′13″W
- Area: less than one acre
- Built: 1920
- Built by: Albert Blunt
- Architectural style: Transverse crib barn
- MPS: White County MPS
- NRHP reference No.: 91001363
- Added to NRHP: July 10, 1992

The Blunt House Livestock Barn is a historic barn in rural White County, Arkansas. It is located on the north side of County Road 94 (Babb Road), west of the hamlet of Midway. It is a wood-frame structure 1 1/2 stories in height, with a gambrel roof and a shed-roof ha storage extension to the east. It is finished in board-and-batten siding; its roof is corrugated metal. Built c. 1920, it is the county's best example of barns built between about 1914 and 1939. The barn is somewhat rare, as gambrel roofs were not commonly used in barn construction in the county before 1930.

The barn was listed on the National Register of Historic Places in 1992.

== See also ==
- National Register of Historic Places listings in White County, Arkansas
