= Milltown Bridge =

Milltown Bridge may refer to:

- Milltown Bridge, Dublin, one of two bridges over the River Dodder at Milltown in Dublin, Ireland
- Milltown Bridge (Milltown, Arkansas), a bridge in Arkansas in the United States recorded in the National Register of Historic Places
- Milltown International Bridge, a bridge crossing the border between Canada and the United States
