= O'Brien, Texas =

- City
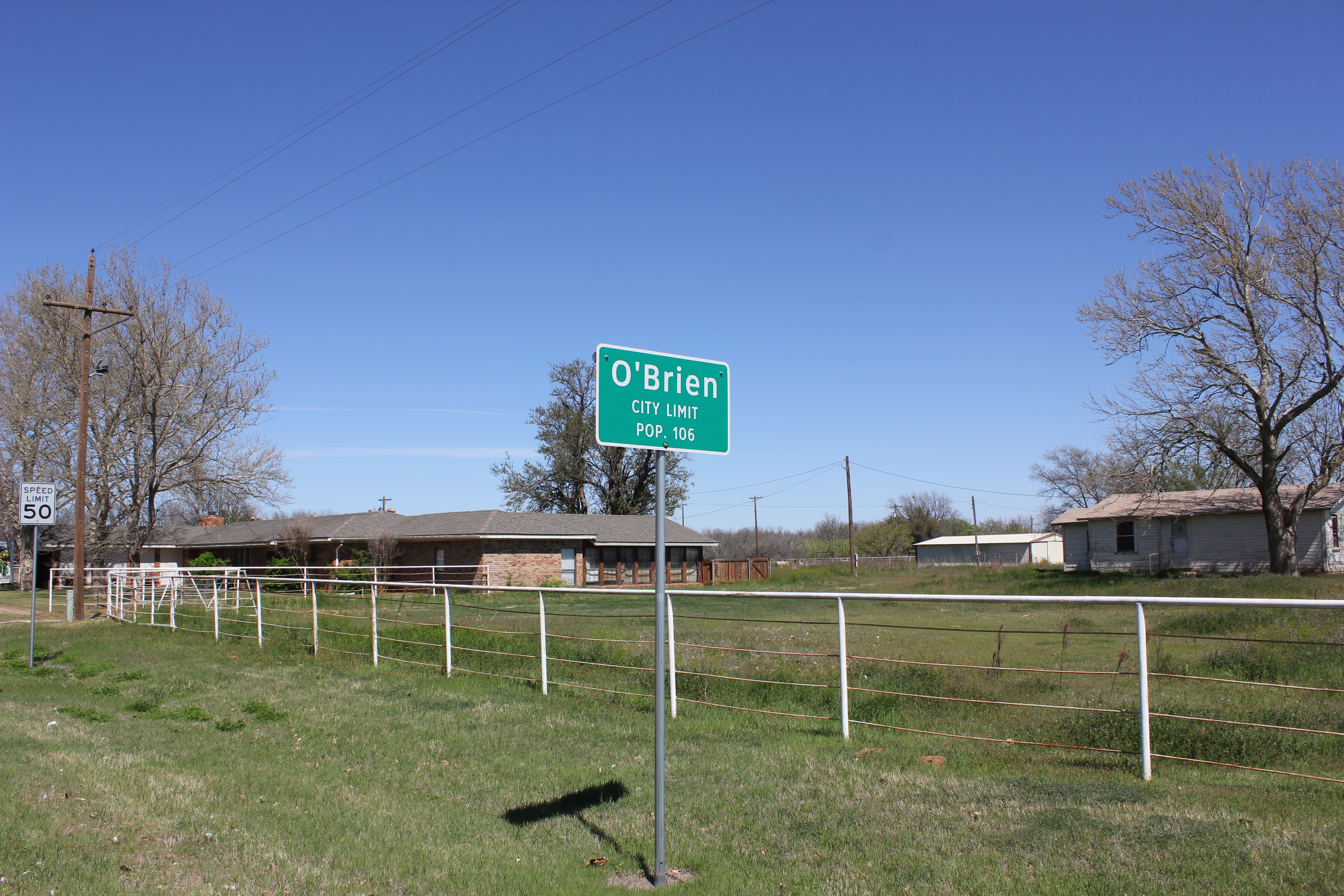

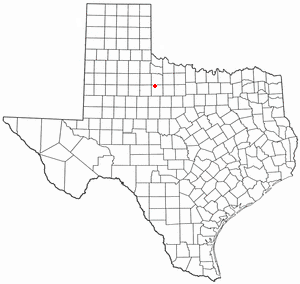
- Location of OBrien, Texas

- Coordinates: 33°22′38″N 99°50′37″W
- Country: United States
- State: Texas
- County: Haskell

Area
  - Total: 0.50 sq mi (1.30 km^{2})
  - Land: 0.50 sq mi (1.30 km^{2})
  - Water: 0 sq mi (0.00 km^{2})
- Elevation: 1,575 ft (480 m)

Population (2020)
  - Total: 91
  - Density: 180/sq mi (70/km^{2})
- Time zone: UTC-6 (Central (CST))
  - Summer (DST): UTC-5 (CDT)
- ZIP code: 79539
- Area code: 940
- FIPS code: 48-53304
- GNIS feature ID: 2411299

O'Brien is a city in Haskell County, Texas, United States. The population was 91 at the 2020 census. O'Brien is located at the junction of Farm to Market Road 2229 and Texas State Highway 6; the nearest large city is Abilene, 70 miles to the south. The area was hit by a destructive and deadly F4 tornado on March 13, 1953.

== History ==
O'Brien was established in the early 20th century as a small agricultural community in northwestern Haskell County. The town was named after a local landowner and cotton farmer, reflecting the region’s dependence on cotton cultivation during that era.

The arrival of the Kansas City, Mexico and Orient Railway in the early 1900s spurred modest growth, as O'Brien became a shipping point for cotton and grain. By the 1920s, the town had a school, churches, and several businesses serving local farmers.

Population peaked in the mid-20th century, but mechanization of agriculture and rural depopulation led to a steady decline. A notable event in O'Brien’s history occurred on March 13, 1953, when an F4 tornado struck the area during the Tornado outbreak of March 12–15, 1953, causing fatalities and widespread destruction.

In 1972, O'Brien gained statewide attention when the local high school football team won the first six-man football state championship in Texas.

== Geography ==
According to the United States Census Bureau, the city has a total area of 0.5 square miles (1.3 km^{2}), all land.

== Demographics ==
Historical population
Census	Pop.	Note	%±
1960	287		—
1970	258		−10.1%
1980	212		−17.8%
1990	152		−28.3%
2000	132		−13.2%
2010	106		−19.7%
2020	91		−14.2%
U.S. Decennial Census; 2020 Census

=== 2020 census ===
As of the 2020 census, O'Brien had a population of 91. The median age was 56.5 years. 16.5% of residents were under the age of 18 and 39.6% of residents were 65 years of age or older. For every 100 females there were 93.6 males, and for every 100 females age 18 and over there were 100.0 males age 18 and over.

0.0% of residents lived in urban areas, while 100.0% lived in rural areas.

There were 40 households in O'Brien, of which 20.0% had children under the age of 18 living in them. Of all households, 35.0% were married-couple households, 35.0% were households with a male householder and no spouse or partner present, and 22.5% were households with a female householder and no spouse or partner present. About 47.5% of all households were made up of individuals and 25.0% had someone living alone who was 65 years of age or older.

There were 59 housing units, of which 32.2% were vacant. The homeowner vacancy rate was 2.9% and the rental vacancy rate was 21.4%.

Racial composition as of the 2020 census
Race	Number	Percent
White	61	67.0%
Black or African American	0	0.0%
American Indian and Alaska Native	2	2.2%
Asian	0	0.0%
Native Hawaiian and Other Pacific Islander	0	0.0%
Some other race	11	12.1%
Two or more races	17	18.7%
Hispanic or Latino (of any race)	44	48.4%

=== 2000 census ===
As of the 2000 census 132 people, 54 households, and 32 families resided in the city. The population density was 262.1 inhabitants per square mile (101.2/km^{2}). The 71 housing units averaged 141.0/sq mi (54.8/km^{2}). The racial makeup of the city was 61.36% White, 0.76% Native American, 37.88% from other races. Hispanics or Latinos of any race were 55.30% of the population.

Of the 54 households, 24.1% had children under the age of 18 living with them, 46.3% were married couples living together, 9.3% had a female householder with no husband present, and 40.7% were not families. About 38.9% of all households were made up of individuals, and 24.1% had someone living alone who was 65 years of age or older. The average household size was 2.44 and the average family size was 3.34.

In the city, the population was distributed as 25.0% under the age of 18, 10.6% from 18 to 24, 15.9% from 25 to 44, 23.5% from 45 to 64, and 25.0% who were 65 years of age or older. The median age was 44 years. For every 100 females, there were 71.4 males. For every 100 females age 18 and over, there were 59.7 males.

The median income for a household in the city was $17,500, and for a family was $18,750. Males had a median income of $25,000 versus $13,214 for females. The per capita income for the city was $10,422. About 22.2% of families and 18.7% of the population were living below the poverty line, including 20.0% of those under 18 and 16.7% of those over 64.

== Education ==
The City of O'Brien is served by the Knox City-O'Brien Consolidated Independent School District.

In 1972, O'Brien won the first six-man football state championship in Texas.
