= Midway Corner, Arkansas =

- Unincorporated community
- Location within Arkansas Location within the United States
- Coordinates: 35°04′07″N 90°17′37″W
- Country: United States
- State: Arkansas
- County: Crittenden
- Elevation: 203 ft (62 m)
- Time zone: UTC-6 (Central (CST))
  - Summer (DST): UTC-5 (CDT)
- Area code: 870
- GNIS feature ID: 58177

Midway Corner is an unincorporated community in Crittenden County, Arkansas, United States. Midway Corner is located on Arkansas Highway 147, 8.2 miles (13.2 km) southwest of West Memphis.
