= LaCrosse, Arkansas =

- Unincorporated community
- Nicknames: Wild Haws and J Bar J
- Location within Arkansas Location within the United States
- Coordinates: 36°05′26″N 91°50′30″W
- Country: United States
- State: Arkansas
- County: Izard
- Elevation: 778 ft (237 m)
- Time zone: UTC-6 (Central (CST))
  - Summer (DST): UTC-5 (CDT)
- Postal code: 72584
- Area code: 870
- GNIS feature ID: 77421

LaCrosse (also La Crosse, Lacrosse, Wild Haws) is an unincorporated community in Izard County, Arkansas, United States. The community is located 3 miles (4.8 km) northeast of Melbourne.
