= Slaughterville, Oklahoma =

Town in Oklahoma, US

- Town
- Motto: "Dedicated to Country Living"
- Location of Slaughterville in Cleveland County and Oklahoma
- Coordinates: 35°05′54″N 97°14′30″W
- Country: United States
- State: Oklahoma
- County: Cleveland

Area
  - Total: 39.00 sq mi (101.01 km^{2})
  - Land: 38.63 sq mi (100.05 km^{2})
  - Water: 0.37 sq mi (0.96 km^{2})
- Elevation: 1,171 ft (357 m)

Population (2020)
  - Total: 4,163
  - Density: 107.8/sq mi (41.61/km^{2})
- Time zone: UTC-6 (Central (CST))
  - Summer (DST): UTC-5 (CDT)
- FIPS code: 40-67950
- GNIS feature ID: 2413296
- Website: www.town.slaughterville.ok.us

Slaughterville is a town in Cleveland County, Oklahoma, United States, and located in the Oklahoma City metropolitan area. As of the 2020 census, the city population was 4,163, a 0.6% increase from 2010.

The community is made up of mostly homes on acreages so it has retained a rural type of land use. Much of the area is wooded and has a natural scenic outdoor appeal to residents and visitors.

== History ==
Slaughterville was named after a grocery store run by James Slaughter in the early 20th century.

The site was located in the Unassigned Lands of Indian Territory. It was opened to settlement in the Land Run of 1889. The first building was erected in the same year. The town did not incorporate until 1970, doing so at that time to avoid annexation by either Norman, Noble, or Lexington.

Slaughterville encompassed 27 square miles (70 km^{2}) at incorporation. It deannexed about 40 percent of the area during the 1980s, but later annexed more land and by 2000 had an area of 38.108 square miles (98.70 km^{2}).

The town name was the subject of controversy in 2004 when People for the Ethical Treatment of Animals (PETA) asked Slaughterville to rename the town to Veggieville, offering a donation of $20,000 of veggie burgers as incentive. Slaughterville's town council heard presentations by members of PETA and local citizens before voting against the suggestion.

== Geography ==
Slaughterville is located in southern Cleveland County. It is bordered to the north by the city of Norman and to the northwest by Noble. Part of its western border touches the Canadian River, across which is McClain County.

U.S. Route 77 passes through the town, leading north 33 miles (53 km) to the center of Oklahoma City and south 6 miles (9.7 km) to Purcell.

According to the United States Census Bureau, the town of Slaughterville has a total area of 38.5 square miles (99.6 km^{2}), of which 38.1 square miles (98.7 km^{2}) is land and 0.35 square miles (0.9 km^{2}), or 0.91%, is water.

== Demographics ==
Historical population
Census	Pop.	Note	%±
1980	1,953		—
1990	1,843		−5.6%
2000	3,609		95.8%
2010	4,137		14.6%
2020	4,163		0.6%
U.S. Decennial Census

=== 2020 census ===
As of the 2020 census, Slaughterville had a population of 4,163. The median age was 39.0 years. 26.3% of residents were under the age of 18 and 15.2% of residents were 65 years of age or older. For every 100 females there were 99.2 males, and for every 100 females age 18 and over there were 100.0 males age 18 and over.

0.0% of residents lived in urban areas, while 100.0% lived in rural areas.

There were 1,476 households in Slaughterville, of which 35.9% had children under the age of 18 living in them. Of all households, 57.6% were married-couple households, 17.5% were households with a male householder and no spouse or partner present, and 18.0% were households with a female householder and no spouse or partner present. About 18.9% of all households were made up of individuals and 7.9% had someone living alone who was 65 years of age or older.

There were 1,646 housing units, of which 10.3% were vacant. The homeowner vacancy rate was 2.9% and the rental vacancy rate was 11.9%.

Racial composition as of the 2020 census
Race	Number	Percent
White	3,299	79.2%
Black or African American	29	0.7%
American Indian and Alaska Native	266	6.4%
Asian	3	0.1%
Native Hawaiian and Other Pacific Islander	2	0.0%
Some other race	106	2.5%
Two or more races	458	11.0%
Hispanic or Latino (of any race)	272	6.5%

=== Income and poverty ===
The median income for a household in the town was $50,982, and the median income for a family was $55,023. The per capita income for the town was $20,011. About 7.4% of families and 11.4% of the population were below the poverty line, including 15.3% of those under age 18 and 3.4% of those age 65 or over.
