= Milltown Bridge (Milltown, Arkansas) =

- U.S. National Register of Historic Places
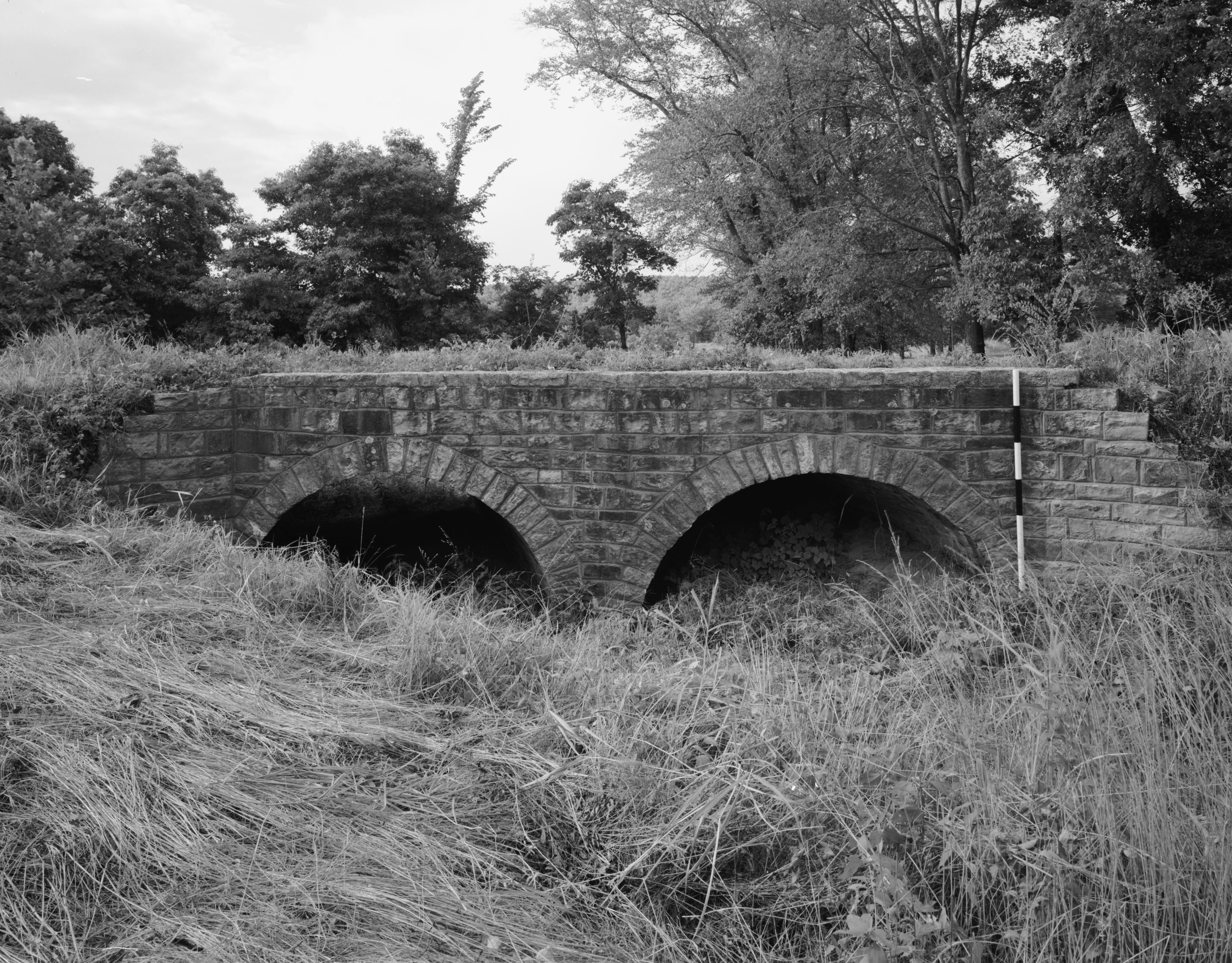
- 1988 HAER photo

- Location within Arkansas Location within the United States
- Nearest city: Milltown, Arkansas
- Coordinates: 35°9′31″N 94°10′28″W
- Area: less than one acre
- Built by: Works Progress Administration
- Architect: Works Progress Administration
- Architectural style: Closed spandrel, deck arch
- MPS: Historic Bridges of Arkansas MPS
- NRHP reference No.: 90000527
- Added to NRHP: April 6, 1990

The Milltown Bridge is a historic stone arch bridge in rural southeastern Sebastian County, Arkansas. The bridge carries County Road 77 across an unnamed brook just west of its junction with White Mountain Road. It is a two-span closed spandrel structure, with each arch spanning 10 feet (3.0 m) and a total length of 24 feet (7.3 m). The arches are formed out of rough-cut stone voussoirs. It was built in the 1930s with funding from the Works Progress Administration, and was, when listed on the National Register of Historic Places in 1990, one of only eight documented bridges of its type in the state.

== See also ==
- List of bridges documented by the Historic American Engineering Record in Arkansas
- List of bridges on the National Register of Historic Places in Arkansas
- National Register of Historic Places listings in Sebastian County, Arkansas
