= Mount Olive, Washington County, Arkansas =

Mount Olive, Arkansas
- Unincorporated community
- Mount Olive's position in Arkansas. Mount Olive, Arkansas (the United States)
- Coordinates: 36°00′06″N 93°57′05″W
- Country: United States
- State: Arkansas
- County: Washington
- Township: Richland
- Elevation: 1,588 ft (484 m)
- Time zone: UTC-6 (Central (CST))
  - Summer (DST): UTC-5 (CDT)
- ZIP code: 72753
- Area code: 479
- GNIS feature ID: 65389

Mount Olive is an unincorporated community in Richland Township in eastern Washington County, Arkansas, United States. It is located on Mount Olive Road, east of Elkins and the Mount Olive Cemetery is about one quarter mile west of the Washington-Madison county line.
