= Etowah, Oklahoma =

Town in Oklahoma, US

- Town
- Location of Etowah, Oklahoma.
- Coordinates: 35°07′15″N 97°10′07″W
- Country: United States
- State: Oklahoma
- County: Cleveland

Area
  - Total: 1.99 sq mi (5.16 km^{2})
  - Land: 1.99 sq mi (5.15 km^{2})
  - Water: 0.0039 sq mi (0.01 km^{2})
- Elevation: 1,076 ft (328 m)

Population (2020)
  - Total: 159
  - Density: 80/sq mi (30.9/km^{2})
- Time zone: UTC-6 (Central (CST))
  - Summer (DST): UTC-5 (CDT)
- FIPS code: 40-24460
- GNIS feature ID: 2412604

Etowah is a town in Cleveland County, Oklahoma, United States. The population was 159 at the 2020 census, a 72.8% increase from 2010.

== History ==
Etowah developed as a rural community east of Noble, Oklahoma along Etowah Road, emerging on the route that connected Purcell, Oklahoma and Tecumseh, Oklahoma after the Land Run of 1889 opened the surrounding Unassigned Lands to non-Native settlement.

The name was reported by historian George H. Shirk to have been adopted from a Cherokee settlement in Georgia, and is commonly traced to a Muscogee word meaning “town.”

An Etowah post office was established in 1894 and discontinued in 1907 when rural free delivery from Noble reached the area. By 1911, the settlement had about seventy-five residents and supported two general stores, a blacksmith, and a cotton oil mill. A community homecoming began in the 1930s and continued for decades.

Residents petitioned Cleveland County, Oklahoma commissioners in 1967 to incorporate Etowah; the election was never held, but the town operated with a municipal government for years. In 1983, after trustees enacted zoning ordinances, a court ruled Etowah to be an incorporated municipality based on its long, continuous operation.

Etowah remained a dispersed rural community through the twentieth century, with many residents commuting to nearby cities. The population was 122 in 2000, declined to 92 in 2010, and grew to 159 by 2020.

== Geography ==
Etowah is located in eastern Cleveland County, Oklahoma, approximately 12 miles (19 km) southeast of Norman and 8 miles (13 km) east of Noble. The town lies near the intersection of Etowah Road and 192nd Avenue SE in a predominantly rural area characterized by open farmland and scattered woodlands.

According to the United States Census Bureau, Etowah has a total area of 1.99 square miles (5.2 km^{2}), all land. The elevation is approximately 1,076 feet (328 m) above sea level.

Etowah is part of the Oklahoma City metropolitan area and is situated within the Cross Timbers ecoregion, which features a mix of prairie and oak woodlands.

== Demographics ==
Historical population
Census	Pop.	Note	%±
1990	33		—
2000	122		269.7%
2010	92		−24.6%
2020	159		72.8%
U.S. Decennial Census

=== 2020 census ===
As of the 2020 census, Etowah had a population of 159. The median age was 41.3 years. 24.5% of residents were under the age of 18 and 17.0% of residents were 65 years of age or older. For every 100 females there were 82.8 males, and for every 100 females age 18 and over there were 84.6 males age 18 and over.

0.0% of residents lived in urban areas, while 100.0% lived in rural areas.

There were 53 households in Etowah, of which 37.7% had children under the age of 18 living in them. Of all households, 52.8% were married-couple households, 11.3% were households with a male householder and no spouse or partner present, and 30.2% were households with a female householder and no spouse or partner present. About 15.1% of all households were made up of individuals and 0.0% had someone living alone who was 65 years of age or older.

There were 56 housing units, of which 5.4% were vacant. The homeowner vacancy rate was 0.0% and the rental vacancy rate was 20.0%.

Racial composition as of the 2020 census
Race	Number	Percent
White	110	69.2%
Black or African American	3	1.9%
American Indian and Alaska Native	7	4.4%
Asian	2	1.3%
Native Hawaiian and Other Pacific Islander	0	0.0%
Some other race	4	2.5%
Two or more races	33	20.8%
Hispanic or Latino (of any race)	12	7.5%

=== 2010 census ===
At the 2010 census, there were 92 people, 42 households, and 34 families in the town. The population density was 59.4 inhabitants per square mile (22.9/km^{2}). There were 50 housing units at an average density of 21.4 per square mile (8.3/km^{2}). The racial makeup of the town was 93.44% White, 0.82% Native American, and 5.74% from two or more races. Hispanic or Latino of any race were 3.28% of the population.

Of the 42 households 45.2% had children under the age of 18 living with them, 78.6% were married couples living together, and 19.0% were non-families. 19.0% of households were one person and 4.8% were one person aged 65 or older. The average household size was 2.90 and the average family size was 3.32.

The age distribution was 32.0% under the age of 18, 11.5% from 18 to 24, 32.8% from 25 to 44, 18.0% from 45 to 64, and 5.7% 65 or older. The median age was 31 years. For every 100 females, there were 121.8 males. For every 100 females age 18 and over, there were 102.4 males.

The median household income was $34,375 and the median family income was $34,375. Males had a median income of $26,786 versus $25,833 for females. The per capita income for the town was $10,190. None of the population and none of the families were below the poverty line.
