= Milltown, Arkansas =

- Unincorporated community
- Location within Arkansas Location within the United States
- Coordinates: 35°09′25″N 94°08′59″W
- Country: United States
- State: Arkansas
- County: Sebastian
- Elevation: 673 ft (205 m)
- Time zone: UTC-6 (Central (CST))
  - Summer (DST): UTC-5 (CDT)
- Area code: 479
- GNIS feature ID: 58191

Milltown is an unincorporated community in Sebastian County, Arkansas, United States. Milltown is located on Arkansas Highway 252, 7.2 miles (11.6 km) southeast of Greenwood.

The Milltown Bridge in Milltown is listed on the National Register of Historic Places.
