= Montana, Arkansas =

Unincorporated community in Arkansas, U.S.

Coordinates: 35°25′30″N 93°32′42″W

Montana is an unincorporated community in Johnson County, in the U.S. state of Arkansas.

== History ==
A post office called Montana was established in 1881 and remained in operation until 1954. The community was named after the Montana Territory.
