= Midway, Lafayette County, Arkansas =

Midway, Arkansas
- Unincorporated community
- Location within Arkansas Location within the United States
- Coordinates: 33°27′42″N 93°37′30″W
- Country: United States
- State: Arkansas
- County: Lafayette
- Elevation: 289 ft (88 m)
- Time zone: UTC-6 (Central (CST))
  - Summer (DST): UTC-5 (CDT)
- Area code: 870
- GNIS feature ID: 77652

Midway (also known as Palm) is an unincorporated community in Lafayette County, Arkansas, United States. Midway is located on Arkansas Highway 29, 7.6 miles (12.2 km) north-northwest of Lewisville.
