= Midway, Jefferson County, Arkansas =

- Unincorporated community
- Location within Arkansas Location within the United States
- Coordinates: 34°17′49″N 92°11′21″W
- Country: United States
- State: Arkansas
- County: Jefferson
- Elevation: 335 ft (102 m)
- Time zone: UTC-6 (Central (CST))
  - Summer (DST): UTC-5 (CDT)
- Area code: 870
- GNIS feature ID: 58172

Midway is an unincorporated community in Jefferson County, Arkansas, United States.

== Geography ==
Midway is located on U.S. Route 270, 11.6 miles (18.7 km) west-northwest of Pine Bluff.
