= Midway, Mississippi County, Arkansas =

Midway, Arkansas
- Unincorporated community
- Location within Arkansas Location within the United States
- Coordinates: 35°58′53″N 90°01′25″W
- Country: United States
- State: Arkansas
- County: Mississippi
- Elevation: 239 ft (73 m)
- Time zone: UTC-6 (Central (CST))
  - Summer (DST): UTC-5 (CDT)
- Area code: 870
- GNIS feature ID: 58175

Midway is an unincorporated community in Mississippi County, Arkansas, United States. Midway is located on Arkansas Highway 181, 7 miles (11 km) west-northwest of Blytheville.
