= Midway, Nevada County, Arkansas =

Midway, Arkansas
- Unincorporated community
- Location within Arkansas Location within the United States
- Coordinates: 33°48′40″N 93°27′24″W
- Country: United States
- State: Arkansas
- County: Nevada
- Elevation: 387 ft (118 m)
- Time zone: UTC-6 (Central (CST))
  - Summer (DST): UTC-5 (CDT)
- Area code: 870
- GNIS feature ID: 57116

Midway is an unincorporated community in Nevada County, Arkansas, United States. Midway is located on U.S. Route 371, 4.4 miles (7.1 km) west of Prescott.
