= Midway, Marion County, Arkansas =

Midway, Arkansas
- Unincorporated community
- Location within Arkansas Location within the United States
- Coordinates: 36°24′38″N 92°39′47″W
- Country: United States
- State: Arkansas
- County: Marion
- Elevation: 810 ft (250 m)
- Time zone: UTC-6 (Central (CST))
  - Summer (DST): UTC-5 (CDT)
- Area code: 870
- GNIS feature ID: 57117

Midway is an unincorporated community in Marion County, Arkansas, United States. Midway is 4.9 miles (7.9 km) west-northwest of Bull Shoals.
