= Midway, Jackson County, Arkansas =

- Unincorporated community
- Location within Arkansas Location within the United States
- Coordinates: 35°33′36″N 91°03′08″W
- Country: United States
- State: Arkansas
- County: Jackson
- Elevation: 230 ft (70 m)
- Time zone: UTC-6 (Central (CST))
  - Summer (DST): UTC-5 (CDT)
- Area code: 870
- GNIS feature ID: 58174

Midway is an unincorporated community in Jackson County, Arkansas, United States. Midway is located on Arkansas Highway 14, 3.3 miles (5.3 km) east of Amagon.
