= Midway, Clark County, Arkansas =

Midway, Arkansas
- Unincorporated community
- Location within Arkansas Location within the United States
- Coordinates: 34°00′48″N 93°06′39″W
- Country: United States
- State: Arkansas
- County: Clark
- Elevation: 285 ft (87 m)
- Time zone: UTC-6 (Central (CST))
  - Summer (DST): UTC-5 (CDT)
- Area code: 870
- GNIS feature ID: 64945

Midway is an unincorporated community in Clark County, Arkansas, United States. Midway is located on U.S. Route 67, 8.1 miles (13.0 km) northeast of Arkadelphia.
