= Tornado outbreak of May 10–13, 2010 =

Tornado outbreak in the United States

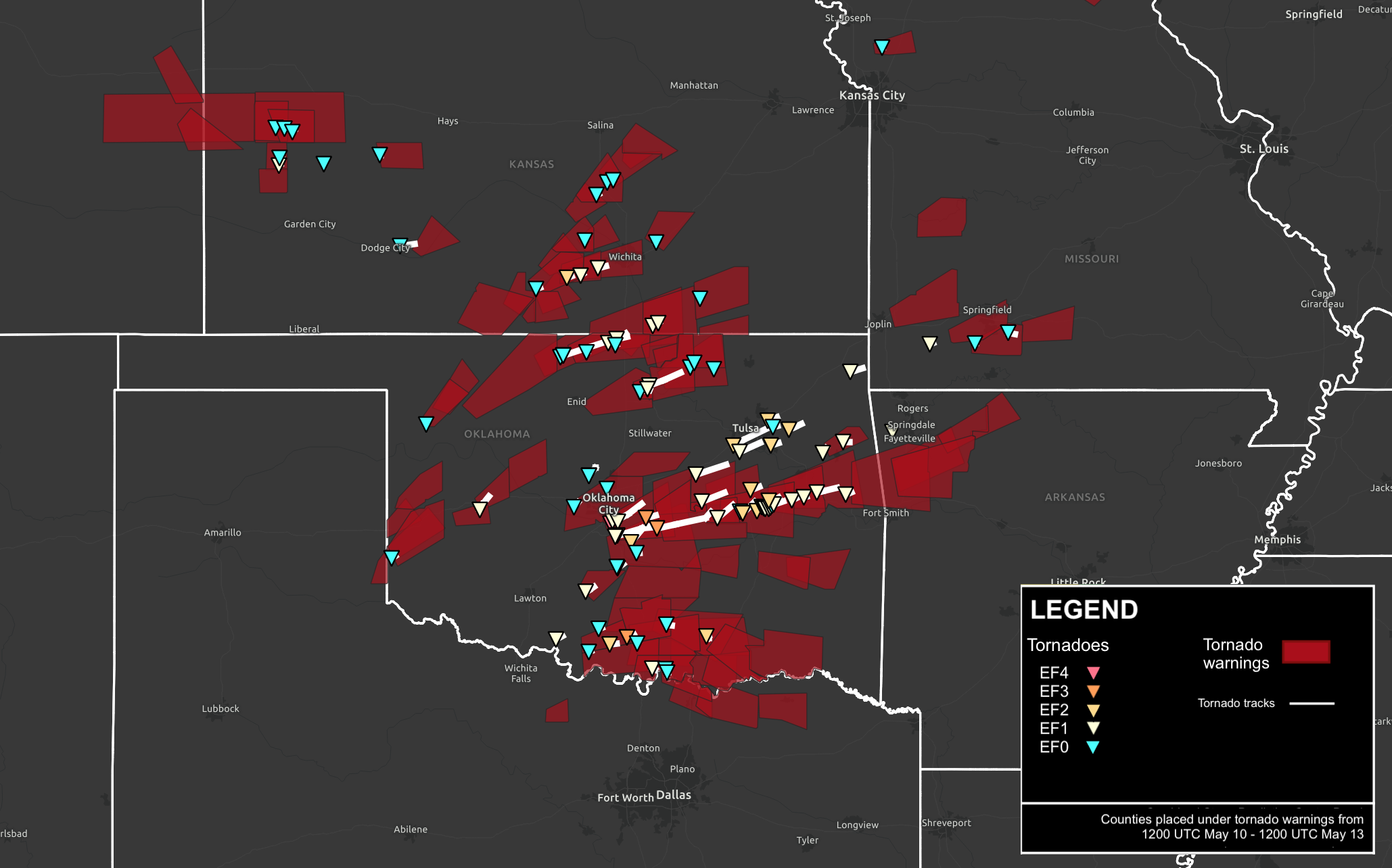
- Tornado warnings and confirmed tornadoes on May 10–13

Meteorological history
- Duration: May 10–13, 2010

Tornado outbreak
- Tornadoes: 91
- Max. rating: EF4 tornado
- Duration: ~3 days, 12 hours
- Highest winds: Tornadic - 170 mph (270 km/h) (Choctaw & Norman, Oklahoma EF4 tornadoes on May 10)

Overall effects
- Fatalities: 3 fatalities
- Injuries: 127 injuries
- Damage: >$595 million (2010 USD)
- Areas affected: High Plains, Midwestern United States
- Part of the tornado outbreaks of 2010

From May 10–13, 2010, a major tornado outbreak affected large areas of Oklahoma, Kansas, Missouri, and Arkansas, with the bulk of the activity in central and eastern Oklahoma. Over 60 tornadoes, some large and multiple-vortex in nature, affected large parts of Oklahoma and adjacent parts of southern Kansas and Missouri, with the most destructive tornadoes causing severe damage in southern suburbs of the Oklahoma City metropolitan area and just east of Norman, Oklahoma, where the fatalities were reported from both tornado tracks. The outbreak was responsible for three fatalities, all of which occurred in Oklahoma. Damage was estimated to be over $595 million in central Oklahoma alone.

Tornado activity continued to a lesser extent until May 13, with a few tornadoes occurring across parts of Oklahoma, Missouri, and Arkansas, as the system lingered for several days.

== Meteorological synopsis ==
=== May 10 ===
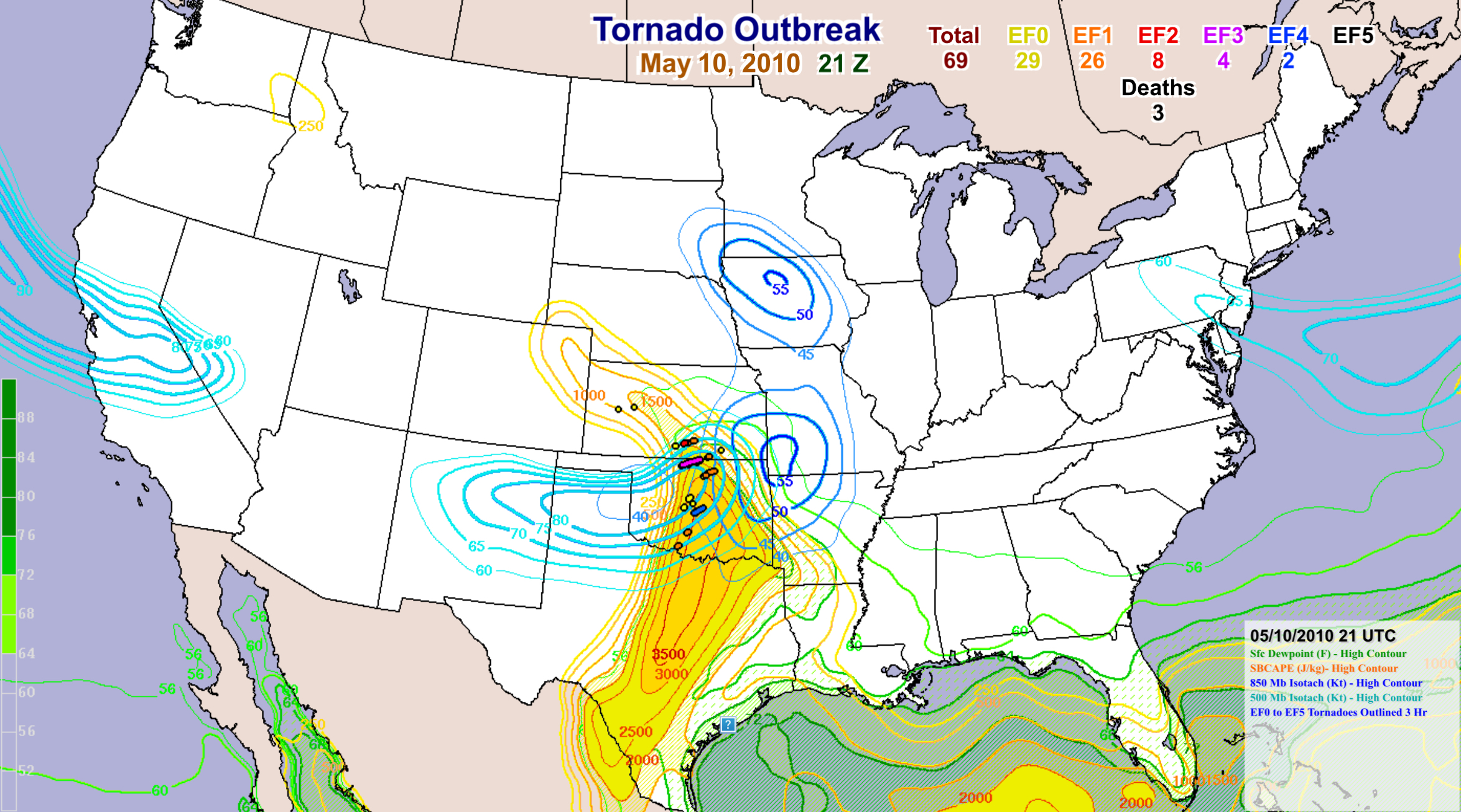
Analysis map for May 10, 2010 showing the setup for the outbreak

An intense trough with dry line activity moved across the southern Plains, especially Oklahoma and southern Kansas, on May 10. For the fourth time in less than three weeks, a high risk of severe weather was issued by the Storm Prediction Center; the high risk covered portions of Oklahoma and Kansas from the interchange of I-35, I-40 and I-44 in the Oklahoma City area, northeastward into southeastern Kansas and eastern Oklahoma; these areas were in the warm sector. Temperatures in the upper 70s to mid 80s°F (upper 20s °C), dewpoints in the upper 60s °F (near 20 °C), very strong deep layer wind shear aided by a strong 500mb jet streak and mixed-layer CAPE values well in excess of 3000 J/kg, aided in highly unstable conditions capable of explosive thunderstorm development and the likelihood of strong, long-track tornadoes with any severe thunderstorms.

Two "particularly dangerous situation" tornado watches were issued that day covering the majority of Oklahoma and portions of Arkansas, Kansas and Missouri. Strong jet stream winds above the surface permitted storm cell motions of more than 40 miles per hour (64 km/h) in many of the storms, creating even more of a dangerous situation for residents in the path of the storms as it aided in any tornadoes that touched down to track several miles in a relatively short period of time. Supercell thunderstorms erupted in the early and mid-afternoon hours in southern Kansas and northern and central Oklahoma. One supercell in northern Oklahoma produced large, multiple-vortex tornadoes that caused significant damage in Medford, Oklahoma. The National Weather Service forecast office in Norman issued the first severe thunderstorm warning of the outbreak for this particular storm at 2:11 p.m. CDT, which was quickly upgraded to a tornado warning 11 minutes later at 2:22 p.m. CDT. Hail was measured as large as 4–6 inches (10–15 centimetres) in diameter in Oklahoma and Kansas.

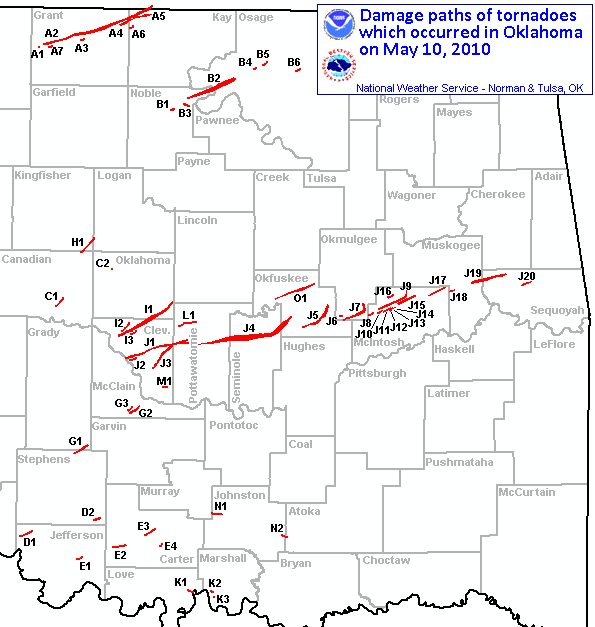
The tracks of the tornadoes across Oklahoma on May 10.

Later in the afternoon, another tornado touched down near Yukon, Oklahoma in the western part of the Oklahoma City metropolitan area, followed by numerous others in the area with a trailer park flattened near Norman, Oklahoma according to KWTV coverage with at least one fatality and many injuries reported. Within a time span of three hours from about 3:30 to 6:30 p.m. CDT (2030 to 2330 UTC), coinciding with the afternoon rush hour, a total of 39 tornadoes touched down (including most of the strongest tornadoes), with 21 tornadoes touching down in a single hour between 5:00 and 6:00 p.m. CDT at the peak of the outbreak. During that hour, there were periods that several tornadoes were on the ground simultaneously. A large grocery store along Highway 9 east of Norman and Lake Thunderbird was severely damaged by a large tornado. Early that evening, a long-lived supercell tracked parallel to Interstate 40 and produced several large and destructive tornadoes from the Oklahoma City metro area through eastern Oklahoma to nearly the Arkansas state line, finally lifting for the last time just before 9:00 p.m. CDT (0200 UTC). Initially, three people were reported to have been killed in Tecumseh, however emergency management officials later advised that there were no fatalities in Tecumseh. Due to the fast movement of the storms, the National Weather Service had, at a couple of points during the outbreak, issued polygonal severe thunderstorm and tornado warnings encompassing several counties, including one tornado warning that included the entire Oklahoma City metropolitan area and neighboring suburbs in Grady, Canadian and Cleveland counties.

The Oklahoma Department of Emergency Management reported that 103 homes were destroyed and that 70 homes had major damage from the storm. In addition, 43 businesses were destroyed, 13 barns were destroyed or damaged, and 69 homes had minor damage. The Oklahoma City Emergency Management's assessment determined that 72 dwellings or businesses were destroyed, 483 were damaged and 226 were affected in some way. The Oklahoma State Department of Health reported that 104 people were treated for injuries. A state of emergency was declared for 56 counties in Oklahoma.

=== May 11–13 ===
The surface front associated with the storm system that resulted in the May 10th outbreak stalled across the Southern Plains, and a series of smaller disturbances contributed to additional severe weather on May 12 and 13. Eight tornadoes occurred in Kansas, Oklahoma and Texas on May 12, though no significant damage resulted. Later that evening, the earlier activity formed into a mesoscale convective complex, and produced 11 tornadoes as the complex pushed into parts of southern Kansas, southwestern Missouri and northeastern Oklahoma; many of which developed without advance warning.

== Confirmed tornadoes ==
Confirmed tornadoes by Enhanced Fujita rating
EFU	EF0	EF1	EF2	EF3	EF4	EF5	Total
0	39	33	13	4	2	0	91

=== Moore–Choctaw–Harrah, Oklahoma ===
Moore–Choctaw–Harrah, Oklahoma
- The tornado as seen from Lake Stanley Draper

Meteorological history
- Formed: May 10, 2010, 5:20 p.m. CDT (UTC–05:00)
- Dissipated: May 10, 2010, 5:51 p.m. CDT (UTC–05:00)
- Duration: 31 minutes

EF4 tornado
- on the Enhanced Fujita scale
- Highest winds: ~170 mph (270 km/h)

Overall effects
- Casualties: 2 fatalities, 49 injuries

At 5:20 p.m. CDT (2220 UTC), a tornado touched down in the southern part of Moore, Oklahoma in Cleveland County near the interchange of I-35 and Indian Hills Road (exit 114) and quickly turned to the east-northeast. Initially, the damage was mostly limited to trees as it tracked across mostly undeveloped land in southeast Moore and extreme southeast Oklahoma City near Stanley Draper Lake, with a few houses sustaining minor damage. Damage increased substantially when it reached near the intersection of SE 89th Street and Hiawassee Road as it turned north-northeast through the semi-rural areas of eastern Oklahoma County.

As it approached I-40, severe damage was done to several businesses at Choctaw Road (exit 166), including a Love's Travel Stop which was destroyed and a Sonic Drive-In which was heavily damaged; employees and several motorists took shelter inside the Love's Travel Stop, they were not hurt. Two people were killed by the tornado, and 49 others were injured, including many motorists in afternoon rush hour traffic on I-40 who had their cars thrown. Numerous other houses were heavily damaged or destroyed, with a few flattened, as the tornado tracked across residential subdivisions near Choctaw and Harrah. The most severe damage was in the Deerfield West subdivision. The tornado lifted in Harrah, just northeast of Reno and Harrah Road, after being on the ground for 24 miles (39 km).

Initially, the tornado was rated EF3. However, due to additional damage surveys finding houses flattened in subdivisions that were difficult to access due to damage, it was upgraded to EF4.

=== Norman–Lake Thunderbird–Pink, Oklahoma ===
Norman–Lake Thunderbird–Pink, Oklahoma
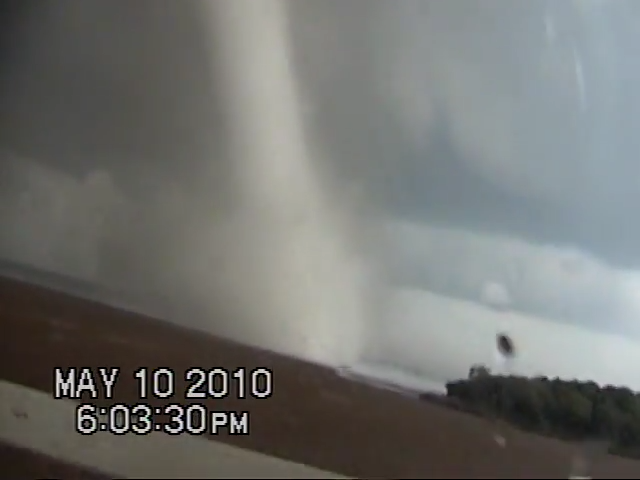
- Frame of the violent Norman tornado crossing Lake Thunderbird

Meteorological history
- Formed: May 10, 2010, 5:32 p.m. CDT (UTC–05:00)
- Dissipated: May 10, 2010, 6:05 p.m. CDT (UTC–05:00)
- Duration: 33 minutes

EF4 tornado
- on the Enhanced Fujita scale
- Highest winds: ~170 mph (270 km/h)

Overall effects
- Casualties: 1 fatality, 32 injuries

Another intense tornado developed in the southern part of Norman in Cleveland County, very close to the National Weather Center at 5:32 p.m. CDT (2232 UTC), and initially precipitated EF1 damage to some homes and businesses, breaking windows and doors, partially stripping some roofs, and destroying well-built wood fences. The tornado gradually intensified as it tracked eastward through the southeastern part of Norman towards Lake Thunderbird. The tornado crossed Lake Thunderbird, severely damaging a marina with about 300 boats in total damaged. Footage from NBC affiliate KFOR-TV's news helicopter captured footage of a van belonging to a plumbing repair company being tossed by the tornado; the man driving the van was uninjured.

The tornado then hit Little Axe Public School, causing significant damage to the property, with concrete pillars and metal bleachers thrown considerable distances. A large grocery store near Little Axe was severely damaged, its roof completely collapsed, and only a few sections of its walls remained standing. Severe damage was reported in several subdivisions in and east of Little Axe, with numerous houses destroyed or completely flattened, and trees were stripped of their bark and branches as it crossed into Pottawatomie County near the community of Pink. The tornado weakened after crossing the county line and lifted between Pink and Tecumseh just before 6:00 pm CDT after being on the ground for about 22 miles (35 km). A 27-year-old woman was killed by this tornado and her three children, initially reported as having been killed as well, were seriously injured. In total, 32 people were injured.

Like the Moore – Choctaw tornado, this was initially rated as an EF3. However, it was upgraded to EF4 in subsequent surveys after additional damage assessments found flattened houses on the eastern end of the track.

== See also ==
- Weather of 2010
- List of North American tornadoes and tornado outbreaks
- List of F4 and EF4 tornadoes
  - List of F4 and EF4 tornadoes (2010–2019)
