= Midway, Howard County, Arkansas =

- Unincorporated community
- Location within Arkansas Location within the United States
- Coordinates: 33°54′05″N 93°53′26″W
- Country: United States
- State: Arkansas
- County: Howard
- Elevation: 341 ft (104 m)
- Time zone: UTC-6 (Central (CST))
  - Summer (DST): UTC-5 (CDT)
- Area code: 870
- GNIS feature ID: 62615

Midway is an unincorporated community in Howard County, Arkansas, United States. Midway is located on Arkansas Highway 27, 4 miles (6.4 km) southwest of Nashville.
