= Noble, Oklahoma =

City in Oklahoma, US

- City
- Flag
- Location of Noble within the state of Oklahoma and Cleveland County
- Coordinates: 35°08′17″N 97°22′10″W
- Country: United States
- State: Oklahoma
- County: Cleveland

Area
  - Total: 12.97 sq mi (33.60 km^{2})
  - Land: 12.76 sq mi (33.04 km^{2})
  - Water: 0.22 sq mi (0.56 km^{2})
- Elevation: 1,175 ft (358 m)

Population (2020)
  - Total: 6,985
  - Density: 548/sq mi (211.4/km^{2})
- Time zone: UTC-6 (Central (CST))
  - Summer (DST): UTC-5 (CDT)
- ZIP code: 73068
- Area codes: 405/572
- FIPS code: 40-52150
- GNIS feature ID: 2411258
- Website: cityofnoble.org

Noble is a city in Cleveland County, Oklahoma, United States, and is part of the Oklahoma City Metropolitan Area. The population was 6,985 at the 2020 census, a 7.8% increase from 2010. Noble is Cleveland County's third-largest city behind Norman and Moore.

== History ==
On April 22, 1889, the day the first Oklahoma "Land Run" opened the Unassigned Lands in the middle of Indian Territory to settlers, J.W. Klinglesmith, Albert Rennie and several other businessmen forded the South Canadian River and laid claim to the 160-acre (65 ha) town site that was to become Noble. The town was named in honor of Secretary of the Interior John Noble, who was instrumental in opening the Unassigned Lands to settlement. The group had great plans for Noble, hoping it would become the future county seat.

The Santa Fe Railroad completed a railroad depot in Noble in August 1889. For several years, Noble was a major shipping point for cattle and other goods from both sides of the Canadian River. Business prospered even more when Charles Edwin Garee built a new suspension toll bridge across the Canadian River in 1898.

The suspension bridge washed out in 1904 and other communities began developing nearby. The last passenger train stopped in Noble in 1944 and the depot was moved.

=== Rose Rock Capital of the World ===
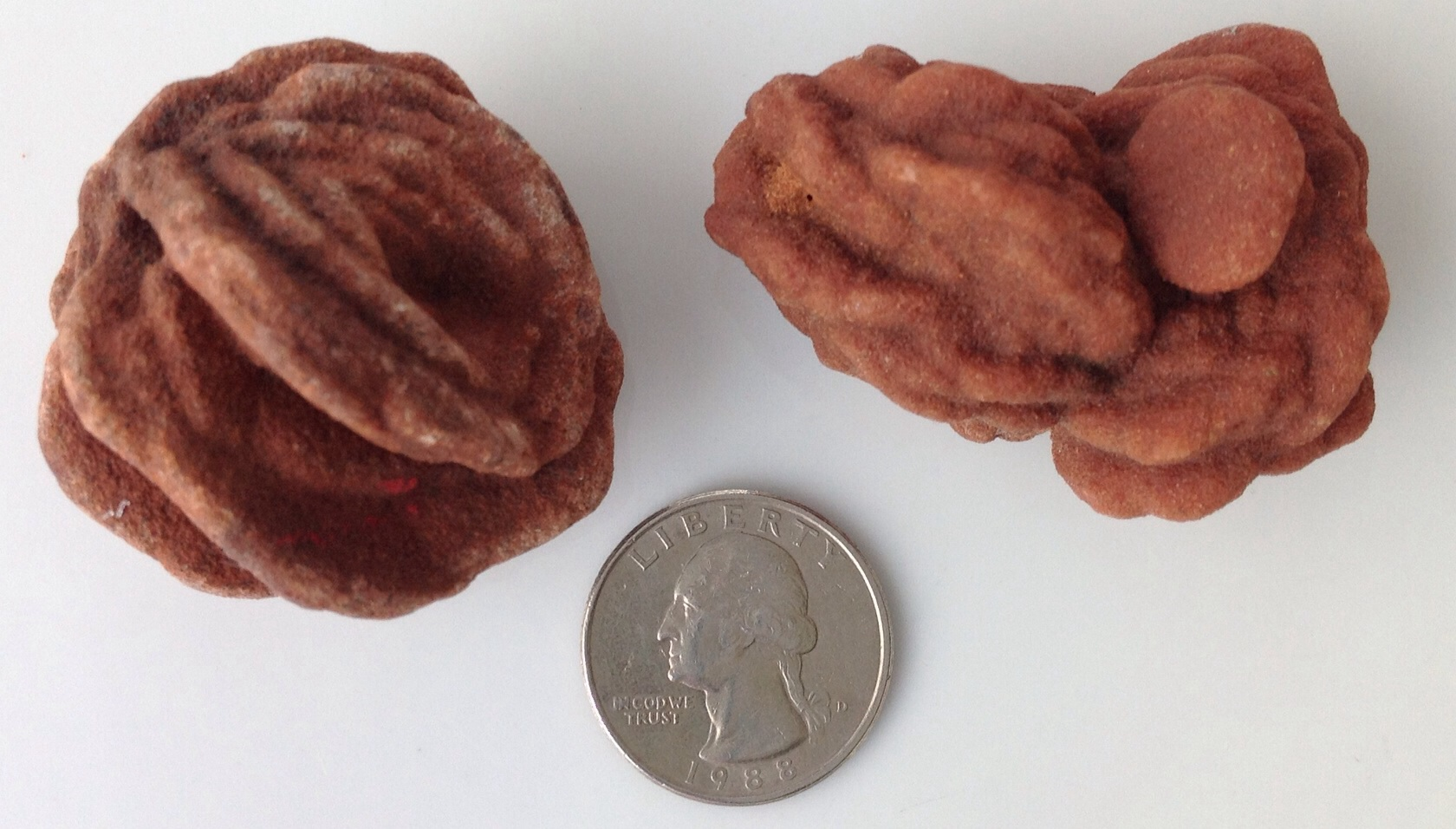
Rose rocks

Noble considers itself to be the "Rose Rock Capital of the World", as the concentration of barium sulfate in the soil is believed to be higher there than anywhere else, causing the formation of rose rocks. Similar formations are found throughout Cleveland County and the Wichita and Ouachita Mountains. Noble sets aside the first Saturday each May to celebrate its annual Rose Rock Festival. Local geologist Joe Stine and his wife opened the Timberlake Rose Rock Museum in 1986 and closed it in 2019.

== Geography ==
Noble is located along the southwest edge of Cleveland County. It is bordered to the north by Norman, to the south by Slaughterville, and to the west by the Canadian River, across which is McClain County. U.S. Route 77 passes through Noble, leading north 28 miles (45 km) to the center of Oklahoma City and south 11 miles (18 km) to Purcell.

According to the United States Census Bureau, Noble has a total area of 13.3 square miles (34.5 km^{2}), of which 13.1 square miles (33.9 km^{2}) is land and 0.23 square miles (0.6 km^{2}), or 1.72%, is water.

== Demographics ==
Historical population
Census	Pop.	Note	%±
1900	349		—
1910	403		15.5%
1920	497		23.3%
1930	463		−6.8%
1940	536		15.8%
1950	724		35.1%
1960	995		37.4%
1970	2,241		125.2%
1980	3,497		56.0%
1990	4,710		34.7%
2000	5,260		11.7%
2010	6,481		23.2%
2020	6,985		7.8%
2023 (est.)	7,739		10.8%
U.S. Decennial Census

=== 2020 census ===
As of the 2020 census, Noble had a population of 6,985. The median age was 37.4 years. 26.2% of residents were under the age of 18 and 16.4% of residents were 65 years of age or older. For every 100 females there were 91.0 males, and for every 100 females age 18 and over there were 86.9 males age 18 and over.

83.8% of residents lived in urban areas, while 16.2% lived in rural areas.

There were 2,699 households in Noble, of which 37.3% had children under the age of 18 living in them. Of all households, 49.8% were married-couple households, 14.7% were households with a male householder and no spouse or partner present, and 28.7% were households with a female householder and no spouse or partner present. About 25.7% of all households were made up of individuals and 12.4% had someone living alone who was 65 years of age or older.

There were 2,957 housing units, of which 8.7% were vacant. Among occupied housing units, 69.3% were owner-occupied and 30.7% were renter-occupied. The homeowner vacancy rate was 1.9% and the rental vacancy rate was 10.4%.

Racial composition as of the 2020 census
Race	Percent
White	79.7%
Black or African American	0.9%
American Indian and Alaska Native	5.6%
Asian	0.5%
Native Hawaiian and Other Pacific Islander	<0.1%
Some other race	1.7%
Two or more races	11.6%
Hispanic or Latino (of any race)	5.5%

=== 2010 census ===
As of the 2010 census of 2010, there were 6,480 people, 1,956 households, and 1,486 families residing in the city. The population density was 420.1 inhabitants per square mile (162.2/km^{2}). There were 2,134 housing units at an average density of 170.4 per square mile (65.8/km^{2}). The racial makeup of the city was 90.30% White, 0.19% African American, 4.87% Native American, 0.25% Asian, 0.02% Pacific Islander, 0.38% from other races, and 3.99% from two or more races. Hispanic or Latino of any race were 2.74% of the population.

There were 1,956 households, out of which 40.0% had children under the age of 18 living with them, 58.5% were married couples living together, 13.3% had a female householder with no husband present, and 24.0% were non-families. 21.0% of all households were made up of individuals, and 7.9% had someone living alone who was 65 years of age or older. The average household size was 2.63 and the average family size was 3.03.

In the city, the population was spread out, with 28.6% under the age of 18, 8.2% from 18 to 24, 31.5% from 25 to 44, 20.8% from 45 to 64, and 11.0% who were 65 years of age or older. The median age was 34 years. For every 100 females, there were 92.3 males. For every 100 females age 18 and over, there were 85.9 males.

The median income for a household in the city was $35,250, and the median income for a family was $40,533. Males had a median income of $30,417 versus $23,690 for females. The per capita income for the city was $16,732. About 4.5% of families and 6.5% of the population were below the poverty line, including 5.5% of those under age 18 and 10.8% of those age 65 or over.

== Government ==
Gary Hayes was elected mayor in March 2006. There are four City Council members and one mayor. The mayor is elected every three years, starting in 1991. Hayes ran unopposed in 2018. Gary Hayes did not run for reelection in 2021. Reverend Phil Freeman was elected mayor in 2021.

== Education ==
The Noble Public Schools' district (Independent #40 as numbered by the state) covers a huge area, stretching west to east across south-central Cleveland County between Norman and Little Axe school districts to the north and Lexington's to the south. Currently the district has three elementary schools, one middle school, and one high school.

The elementary school for children in kindergarten through first grade is the Katherine I. Daily Elementary School, named after the longtime principal. The next school in the Noble Public School system is the John Hubbard Elementary School, named for the longtime district superintendent from the 1950s-70s, and educates children in second and third grade.

Following their two years at Hubbard, children attend the Pioneer Intermediate School for fourth and fifth grades. Pioneer formerly educated sixth graders; however, they now attend the recently completed Noble Middle School. Nathan Gray is the principal and is serving his 4th year in this position.

Until recently, children went to Noble Junior High for seventh through eighth grade. However, the building that used to be the junior high is now Noble Public School's administration building. Noble Middle School was built, and educates students in sixth through eighth grade. When the superintendent, Curtis Inge, died they renamed the school The Curtis Inge Middle School.

Noble High School, with the Bears as its mascot, is where children finish their secondary education in Noble. The schools' athletic programs compete in Oklahoma's class 5A in most sports, including football, basketball, baseball, and golf. The wrestling team competes in class 4A.

Noble High is also home to many clubs, programs and extra-curricular activities, such as a class 5A marching band. Over the decades since the district and High School grew to their modern size in the 1970s, various programs in newspaper, yearbook, vocal music, Student Council, FFA and others have held statewide office and been leaders in their fields.

The Noble Public Schools Foundation Board for Academic Excellence has initiated a "50 for 50" campaign to raise $50,000 a year for endowment to benefit Noble students by funding teacher grants. As of June 2015 they have raised over $165,000.00.

The Noble Public Schools' district is far larger in area than the boundary limits of the City of Noble proper, owing to the closure and consolidation of all the original small dependent schools in the 1940s-60s. This means that students come from the north half of Slaughterville as well as Noble and unincorporated areas, and even a strip of rural south Norman. Formally dating to only 1970, the Town of Slaughterville never carved out its own school district, and its residents' children attend either Noble, Lexington, or are home-schooled.

== Notable people ==
- Al Benton, baseball player
- Bill Nations, dentist and politician
- Brandon Harper, Football Player
