= Midway, Lee County, Arkansas =

Midway, Arkansas
- Unincorporated community
- Location within Arkansas Location within the United States
- Coordinates: 34°53′36″N 90°27′15″W
- Country: United States
- State: Arkansas
- County: Lee
- Elevation: 203 ft (62 m)
- Time zone: UTC-6 (Central (CST))
  - Summer (DST): UTC-5 (CDT)
- Area code: 870
- GNIS feature ID: 58170

Midway is an unincorporated community in Lee County, Arkansas, United States. Midway is located on Midway Lake, an oxbow lake of the Mississippi River, 19.1 miles (30.7 km) east-northeast of Marianna.
