= Midway (near Pleasant Plains), White County, Arkansas =

Midway, Arkansas
- Unincorporated community
- Location within Arkansas Location within the United States
- Coordinates: 35°31′04″N 91°36′03″W
- Country: United States
- State: Arkansas
- County: White
- Elevation: 607 ft (185 m)
- Time zone: UTC-6 (Central (CST))
  - Summer (DST): UTC-5 (CDT)
- Area code: 501
- GNIS feature ID: 51943

Midway is an unincorporated community in White County, Arkansas, United States. Midway is located on U.S. Route 167, 3 miles (4.8 km) southeast of Pleasant Plains.
