= Midway, St. Francis County, Arkansas =

Midway, Arkansas
- Unincorporated community
- Location within Arkansas Location within the United States
- Coordinates: 35°07′46″N 90°34′39″W
- Country: United States
- State: Arkansas
- County: St. Francis
- Elevation: 203 ft (62 m)
- Time zone: UTC-6 (Central (CST))
  - Summer (DST): UTC-5 (CDT)
- Area code: 870
- GNIS feature ID: 83212

Midway is an unincorporated community in St. Francis County, Arkansas, United States. Midway is located at the junction of two gravel roads in northern St. Francis County, 14.65 miles (23.58 km) northeast of Forrest City.
