= Mill Creek, Pope County, Arkansas =

Mill Creek, Arkansas
- Unincorporated community
- Mill Creek's position in Arkansas. Mill Creek, Arkansas (the United States)
- Coordinates: 35°19′23″N 93°12′16″W
- Country: United States
- State: Arkansas
- County: Pope
- Elevation: 344 ft (105 m)
- Time zone: UTC-6 (Central (CST))
  - Summer (DST): UTC-5 (CDT)
- GNIS feature ID: 62076

Mill Creek is an unincorporated community in Clark Township, Pope County, Arkansas, United States.
