= Midway (near Bald Knob), White County, Arkansas =

Midway, Arkansas
- Unincorporated community
- Location within Arkansas Location within the United States
- Coordinates: 35°17′34″N 91°36′28″W
- Country: United States
- State: Arkansas
- County: White
- Elevation: 256 ft (78 m)
- Time zone: UTC-6 (Central (CST))
  - Summer (DST): UTC-5 (CDT)
- Area code: 501
- GNIS feature ID: 58173

Midway is an unincorporated community in White County, Arkansas, United States. Midway is located on Arkansas Highway 367, 2.5 miles (4.0 km) southwest of Bald Knob.
