= McClintock (disambiguation) =

McClintock is a surname.

McClintock may also refer to:

== Places ==
- M'Clintock Channel, also spelled McClintock, a waterway in Canada
- MacKlintok Island, also spelled McClintock, Franz Josef Land, Russia
- McClintock Peak, Montana
- Mount McClintock, Antarctica
- McClintock Point, Antarctica
- McClintock Ridge, Antarctica

== Arts and entertainment ==
- McLintock!, a 1963 American film starring John Wayne and Maureen O'Hara
- Phineas McClintock, pseudonym of Prison Break TV series character Michael Scofield
- Harlan "Mountain" McClintock, a character in the 1956 film Requiem for a Heavyweight

== Other uses ==
- McClintock Prize for plant genetics and genome studies
- McClintock High School, Tempe, Arizona, United States
- McClintock House (disambiguation)
- McClintock v Dept of Constitutional Affairs, a 2008 UK employment discrimination law case
- 20440 McClintock, an asteroid discovered in 1999

== See also ==
- McClintock effect, also known as menstrual synchrony, or as the dormitory effect
- SS James H. McClintock, a US ship launched in 1943
- McClintic
- McClinton (disambiguation)
