= McClintock =

McClintock, rarely MacClintock, is a surname of Scottish and Irish Gaelic origin deriving from an anglicization of a Gaelic name variously recorded as M'Ilandick, M'Illandag, M'Illandick, M'Lentick, McGellentak, Macilluntud, McClintoun, and Mac Illiuntaig from the 14th century onward. The name is found mostly in County Donegal. The surname McClinton is an anglicization of the same Gaelic name. Notable people with the surname include:

== McClintock ==
- Anne McClintock (born 1954), feminist scholar in Zimbabwe
- Barbara McClintock (1902–1992), American scientist who won the Nobel Prize for Medicine
- Barbara McClintock (illustrator) (born 1955), American artist
- Byron McClintock (1930–2022), American Abstract Expressionist artist
- Charles B. McClintock (1886–1965), American politician from Ohio
- Cynthia McClintock (born 1945), prominent American scholar of Latin America and professor of political science and international affairs
- Dan McClintock (born 1977), American professional basketball player
- David McClintock (1913–2001), English natural historian, botanist, horticulturist and author
- Eddie McClintock (born 1967), American actor
- Elizabeth McClintock (1912–2004), American botanist
- Emory McClintock (1840–1916), American actuary
- Francis Leopold McClintock (1819–1907), Irish explorer
- Frank McLintock (born 1939), Scottish footballer
- Frank A. McClintock (1921–2011), Professor of Mechanical Engineering, MIT
- Harry McClintock (1882–1957), American musical composer
- Herbert McClintock (1906–1985), Australian social realist artist
- James H. McClintock (1864–1934), American author
- Jessica McClintock (1930–2021), American clothing designer
- John McClintock (disambiguation), multiple people
- Jonas R. McClintock (1808–1879), American politician
- Kenneth McClintock (born 1957), Puerto Rican politician
- Martha McClintock (born 1947), American psychologist
- Norah McClintock (born c. 1965), Canadian author
- Peter V. E. McClintock (born 1940), British physicist
- Poley McClintock (1900–1980), American musician
- Rembrandt McClintock (c. 1901–c. 1968), Australian lithographer
- Ronald McClintock (1892-1922), British World War I flying ace
- Steven McClintock (born 1953), American musician
- Tom McClintock (born 1956), American politician (California)
- William McClintock (disambiguation), multiple people

== MacClintock ==
- Carol MacClintock (1910–1989), American musicologist and editor
- Dorcas MacClintock (1932–2023), American biologist, non-fiction author and sculptor
