= McClintock House =

McClintock House may refer to:

in the United States

(by state)

- James H. McClintock House, Phoenix, Arizona, listed on the National Register of Historic Places (NRHP) in Phoenix, Arizona
- McClintock House (43 Magnolia, Marianna, Arkansas), NRHP-listed in Lee County, also known as J.M. McClintock House
- McClintock House (82 W. Main St., Marianna, Arkansas), NRHP-listed in Lee County, also known as W.S. McClintock House
- John and Amelia McClintock House, Grafton, Illinois, NRHP-listed in Jersey County
- McClintock Hall, Wilkes-Barre, Pennsylvania, NRHP-listed in Luzerne County
