= National Register of Historic Places listings in Madison County, Arkansas =

Location of Madison County in Arkansas

This is a list of the National Register of Historic Places listings in Madison County, Arkansas.

This is intended to be a complete list of the properties and districts on the National Register of Historic Places in Madison County, Arkansas, United States. The locations of National Register properties and districts for which the latitude and longitude coordinates are included below, may be seen in a map.

There are 12 properties and districts listed on the National Register in the county.

Contents: Counties in Arkansas
- Arkansas
- Ashley
- Baxter
- Benton
- Boone
- Bradley
- Calhoun
- Carroll
- Chicot
- Clark
- Clay
- Cleburne
- Cleveland
- Columbia
- Conway
- Craighead
- Crawford
- Crittenden
- Cross
- Dallas
- Desha
- Drew
- Faulkner
- Franklin
- Fulton
- Garland
- Grant
- Greene
- Hempstead
- Hot Spring
- Howard
- Independence
- Izard
- Jackson
- Jefferson
- Johnson
- Lafayette
- Lawrence
- Lee
- Lincoln
- Little River
- Logan
- Lonoke
- Madison
- Marion
- Miller
- Mississippi
- Monroe
- Montgomery
- Nevada
- Newton
- Ouachita
- Perry
- Phillips
- Pike
- Poinsett
- Polk
- Pope
- Prairie
- Pulaski (Little Rock)
- Randolph
- St. Francis
- Saline
- Scott
- Searcy
- Sebastian
- Sevier
- Sharp
- Stone
- Union
- Van Buren
- Washington
- White
- Woodruff
- Yell

This National Park Service list is complete through NPS recent listings posted May 1, 2026.

== Current listings ==
	Name on the Register	Image	Date listed	Location	City or town	Description
1	Bank of Kingston	Bank of Kingston	March 25, 1982 (#82002122)	101 Public Sq. 36°03′03″N 93°31′05″W	Kingston	1911 commercial structure
2	Bunch Store	Bunch Store	November 26, 1999 (#99001350)	100 Public Sq. 36°03′03″N 93°31′06″W	Kingston	1890 wood frame commercial structure
3	Cannon Creek Bridge	Cannon Creek Bridge	September 22, 2004 (#04001033)	County Road 5340; 35°54′26″N 93°56′44″W	Cannon Creek	1929 curved concrete deck bridge built on former Highway 16
4	Enterprise School	Enterprise School	September 10, 1992 (#92001192)	Southeast of the junction of County Roads 8 and 192; 35°59′17″N 93°55′27″W	Thorney	1935 school with Craftsman and Colonial Revival details
5	Orval E. Faubus House		September 27, 2019 (#100004443)	640 Governors Rd. 36°05′15″N 93°43′31″W	Huntsville	
6	Huntsville Commercial Historic District	Huntsville Commercial Historic District	July 24, 2008 (#08000705)	Roughly bounded by War Eagle, Hughes, Church, and Harris Sts. 36°05′15″N 93°44′09″W	Huntsville	Historic center of economic activity in Huntsville
7	Madison County Courthouse	Madison County Courthouse	November 19, 1993 (#93001253)	1 Main St. 36°05′14″N 93°44′11″W	Huntsville	1939 restrained Art Deco structure
8	Pettigrew School	Pettigrew School	March 23, 1995 (#95000272)	North of Highway 16; 35°49′04″N 93°38′59″W	Pettigrew	1915 wood frame school
9	St. Paul School Building	St. Paul School Building	May 24, 2006 (#06000416)	200 W. 4th St. 35°49′29″N 93°45′59″W	St. Paul	1939 WPA school
10	War Eagle Creek Bridge	War Eagle Creek Bridge	January 24, 2008 (#07001430)	County Road 53 over War Eagle Creek; 36°07′24″N 93°41′39″W	Old Alabam	1925 open-spandrel concrete arch bridge
11	Wharton Creek Roadside Park		May 3, 2024 (#100010310)	South side of Arkansas Highway 74, approximately 600 feet east of Madison County Road 150; 36°02′00″N 93°40′21″W	Wharton	
12	Williams House and Associated Farmstead	Williams House and Associated Farmstead	May 18, 2001 (#01000508)	Off Highway 23; 35°50′51″N 93°44′56″W	St. Paul	1935 hand-hewn log cabin structure with 1922 outbuildings

== Former listing ==
	Name on the Register	Image	Date listed	Date removed	Location	City or town	Description
1	Alabam School		July 14, 1976 (#76000432)	May 12, 2000	S of Alabam at junction of U.S. Highway 412 and Highway 127	Old Alabam	1925 church/school

== See also ==
- List of National Historic Landmarks in Arkansas
- National Register of Historic Places listings in Arkansas
