= McClintic =

McClintic is a surname. Notable people with the surname include:

- Guthrie McClintic (1893–1961), American theatre and film director and producer
- James V. McClintic (1878–1948), American politician from Texas and Oklahoma

== Fictional characters ==
- McClintic Sphere, a character in Thomas Pynchon novel V.

== Other uses ==
- T. B. McClintic (boarding tug), a United States Public Health Service vessel of 1932, named for Dr Thomas B. McClintic (c1873-1912)

== See also ==
- McClintic-Marshall House, at Lehigh University in Pennsylvania
- McClintock (disambiguation)
