= St. Paul School District =

Defunct school district in Arkansas, United States

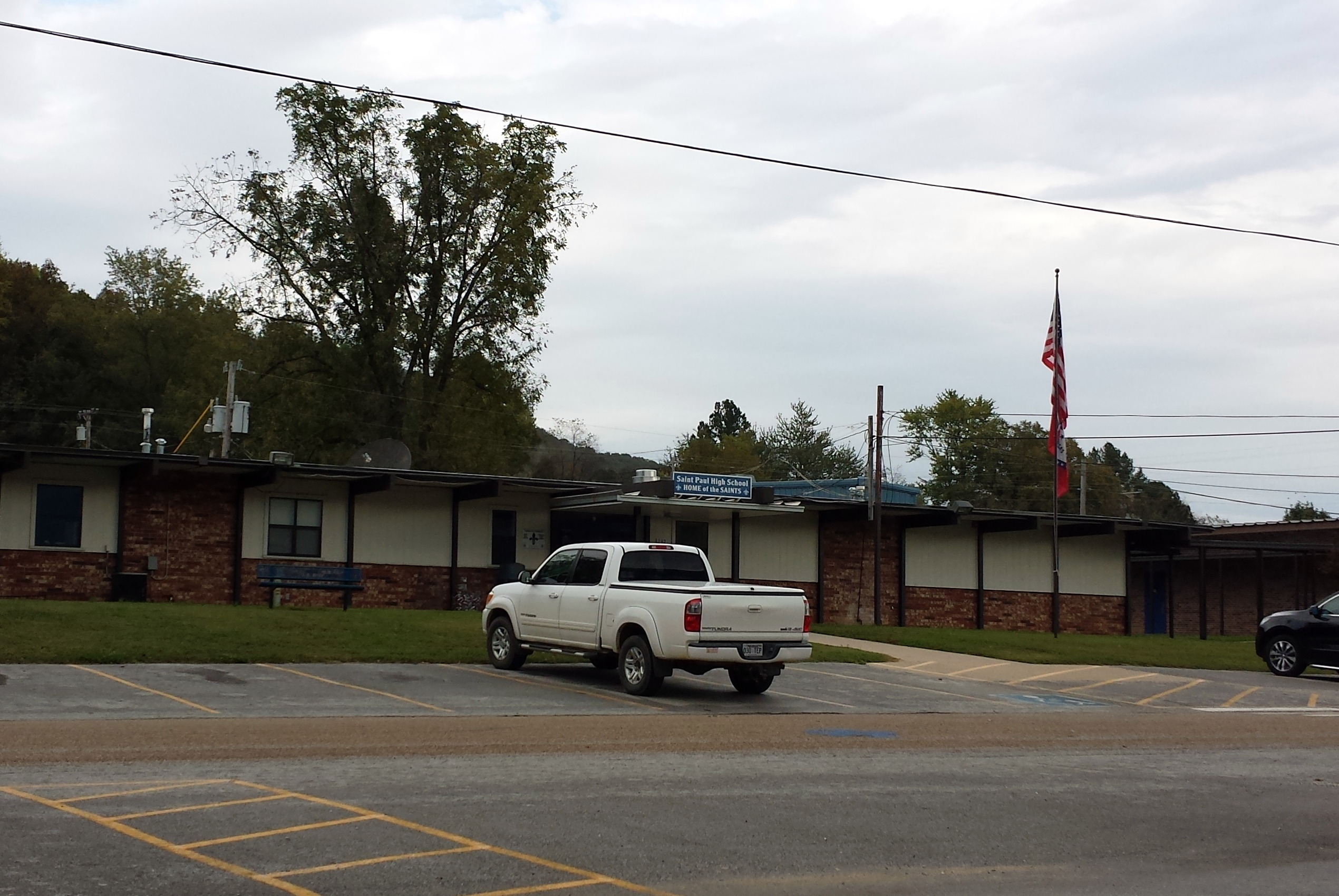
St. Paul High School

St. Paul School District No. 48 was a school district headquartered in St. Paul, Arkansas.

On July 1, 2004, the St. Paul School District was merged into the Huntsville School District.

== See also ==
- St. Paul High School (Arkansas)
- St. Paul School Building
