= Williams House and Associated Farmstead =

Historic house in Arkansas, United States

- U.S. National Register of Historic Places
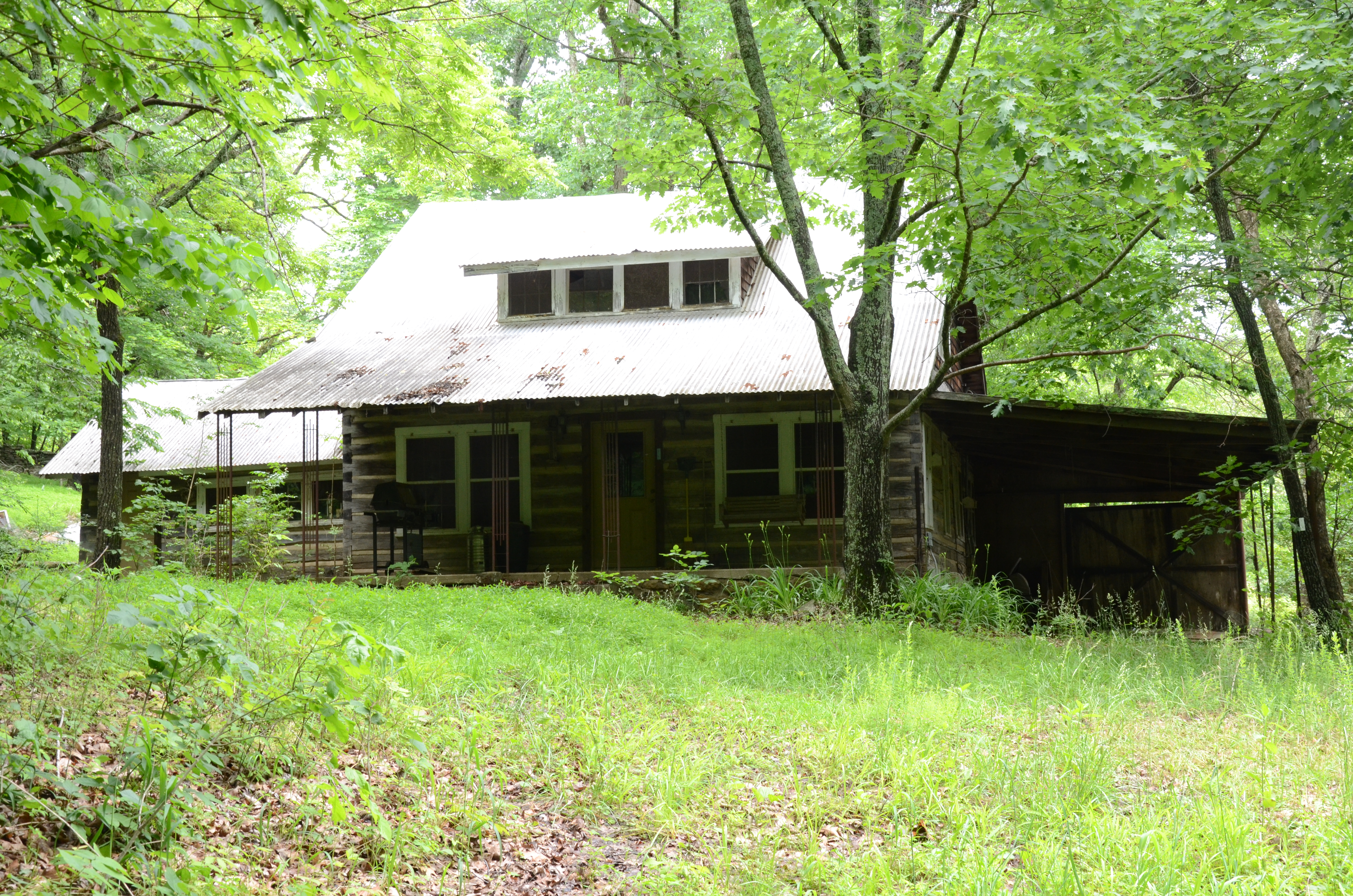

- Location within Arkansas Location within the United States
- Location: County Road 172, St. Paul, Arkansas
- Coordinates: 35°50′51″N 93°44′56″W
- Area: 20 acres (8.1 ha)
- Built: 1935
- Architect: Earl and Mack Williams
- Architectural style: Rustic Style
- NRHP reference No.: 01000508
- Added to NRHP: May 18, 2001

The Williams House and Associated Farmstead is a historic farm property in southern Madison County, Arkansas. It is located northeast of St. Paul, at the end of County Road 172. The main house is a 1 1/2-story log structure, fashioned out of hand-hewn timbers fitted together with dovetail joints and concrete chinking. The property includes a barn, smokehouse, chicken house, and privy, all of which were built around 1922–25. The house was built in 1935, and is locally unusual for the late date for the use of log construction to build a pioneer-style house.

The property was listed on the National Register of Historic Places in 2001.

== See also ==
- National Register of Historic Places listings in Madison County, Arkansas
