= Cannon Creek Bridge =

- U.S. National Register of Historic Places
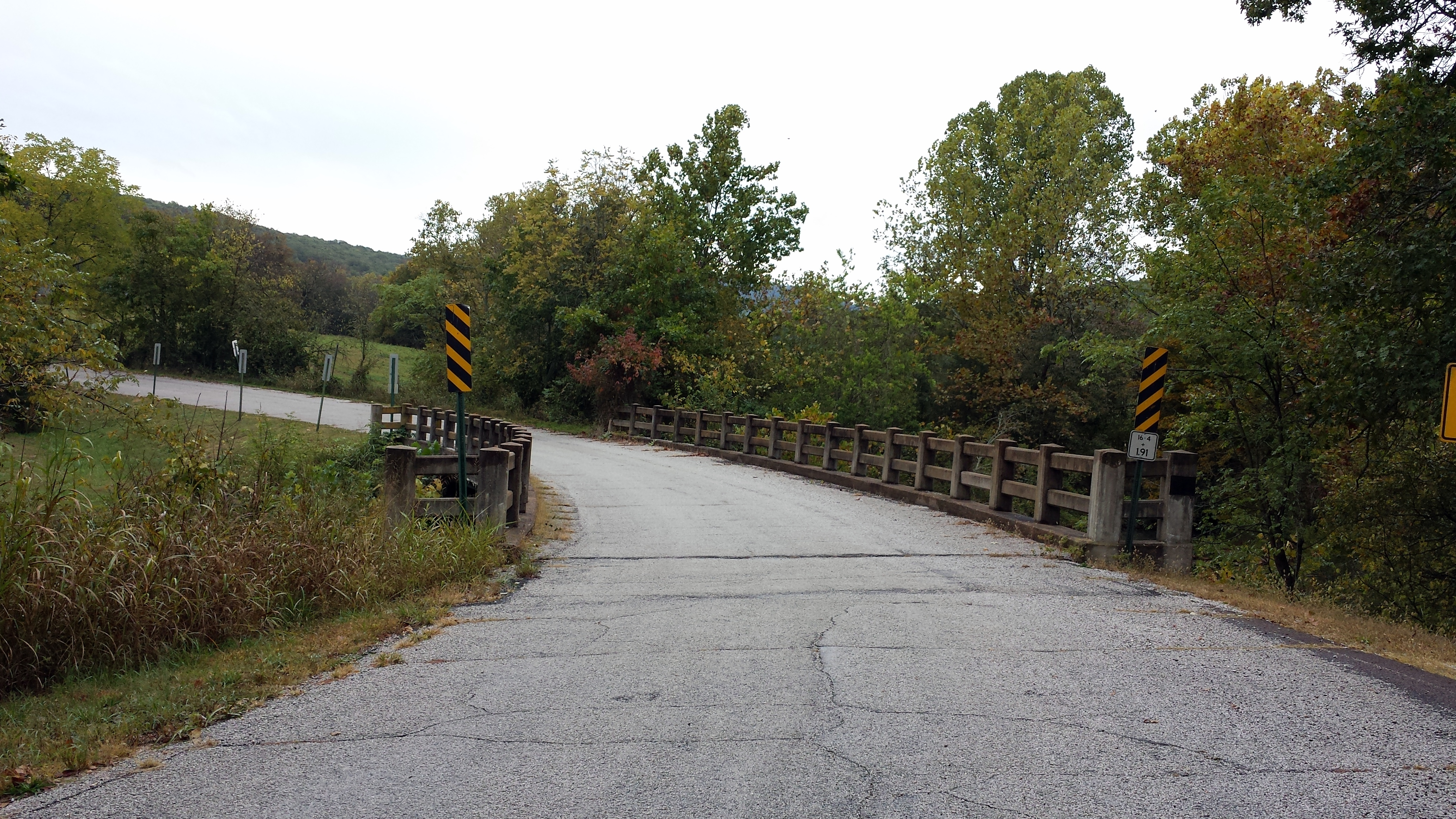

- Location within Arkansas Location within the United States
- Location: Madison Cty. Rd. 5340, Cannon Creek, Arkansas
- Coordinates: 35.90538°N 93.94564°W
- Area: less than one acre
- Built: 1929
- Built by: Walsh & Thomas
- Engineer: C.S. Christian
- Architectural style: Reinforced concrete deck
- MPS: Historic Bridges of Arkansas MPS
- NRHP reference No.: 04001033
- Added to NRHP: September 22, 2004

The Cannon Creek Bridge is a historic bridge in rural western Madison County, Arkansas. The bridge is located southeast of Durham, carrying County Road 5340 across Cannon and Coon Creeks. It is a curving concrete deck structure with an overall length of about 103 feet (31 m) and a deck width of 20 feet (6.1 m). Built in 1929 to carry Arkansas Highway 16, it is the only known surviving curved concrete deck bridge in the state. It was bypassed by the present alignment of Highway 16 in the 1980s.

The bridge was listed on the National Register of Historic Places in 2004.

== See also ==
- National Register of Historic Places listings in Madison County, Arkansas
- List of bridges on the National Register of Historic Places in Arkansas
