= Marianna station =

- Marianna Missouri Pacific Depot
- U.S. National Register of Historic Places
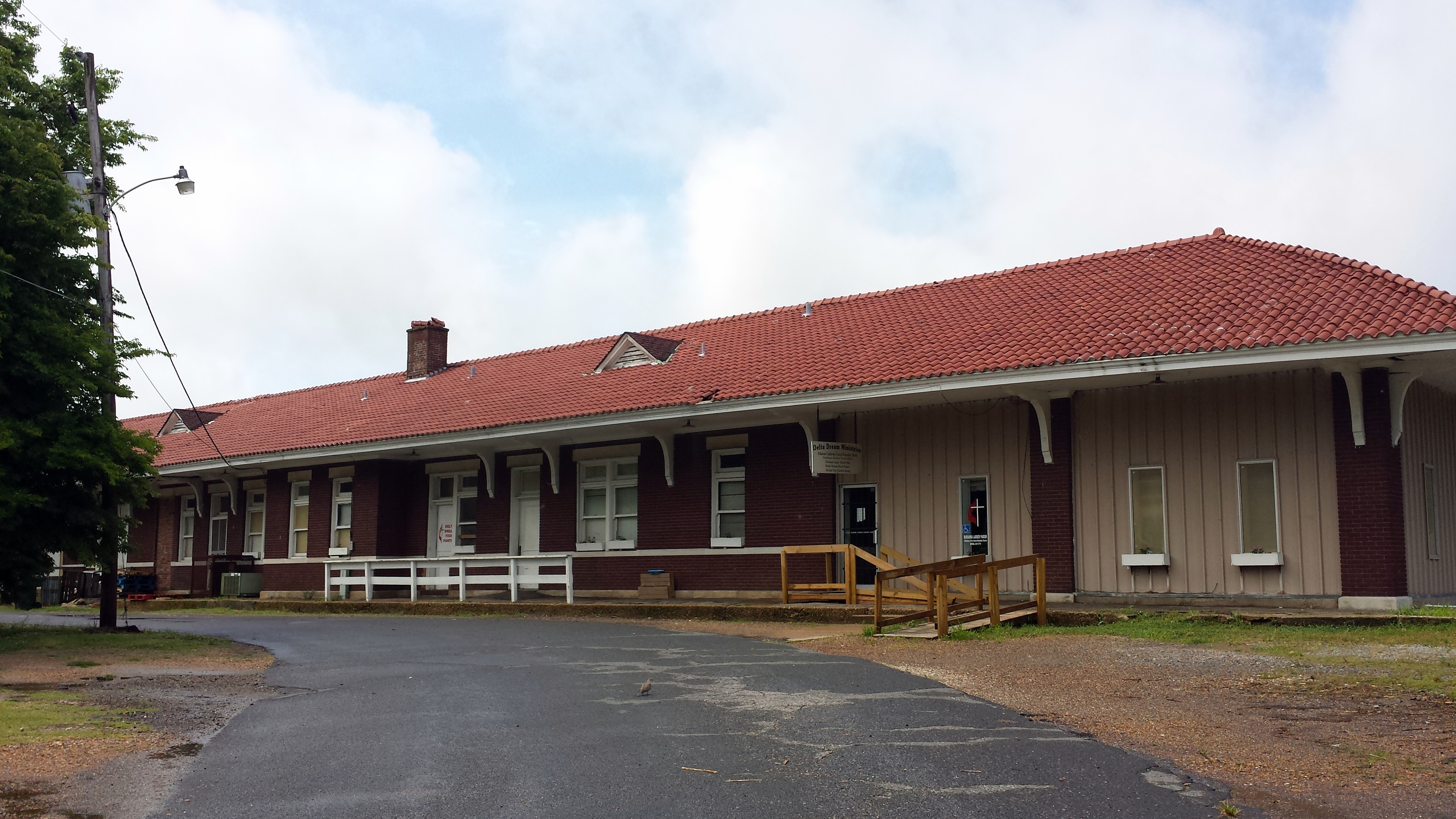

- Location within Arkansas Location within the United States
- Location: Carolina Street South, Marianna, Arkansas
- Coordinates: 34°46′14″N 90°45′39″W
- Area: less than one acre
- Built: 1915
- Built by: Missouri Pacific Railroad
- Architectural style: Italianate, Mission/Spanish Revival
- MPS: Historic Railroad Depots of Arkansas MPS
- NRHP reference No.: 94000827
- Added to NRHP: August 5, 1994

Marianna Missouri Pacific Depot is a historic railroad station at Carolina and Jarrett Streets in Marianna, Arkansas. It is a long rectangular brick building, with a tile roof. A projection on the track side for the telegrapher's booth is matched by a projection on the opposite side. The depot was built in 1915 by the Missouri Pacific Railroad during a major expansion campaign throughout the state, to provide passenger and freight services to the city.

The building was listed on the U.S. National Register of Historic Places in 1994, at which time it housed a job training center.

== See also ==
- National Register of Historic Places listings in Lee County, Arkansas

Preceding station	Missouri Pacific Railroad	Following station
Haynes toward Wynne	Wynne - Helena	Latour toward Helena
