= National Register of Historic Places listings in Lee County, Arkansas =

Location of Lee County in Arkansas

This is a list of the National Register of Historic Places listings in Lee County, Arkansas.

This is intended to be a complete list of the properties and districts on the National Register of Historic Places in Lee County, Arkansas, United States. The locations of National Register properties and districts for which the latitude and longitude coordinates are included below may be seen in a map.

There are 12 properties and districts listed on the National Register in the county, including 1 National Historic Landmark. Another property was once listed but has been removed.

Contents: Counties in Arkansas
- Arkansas
- Ashley
- Baxter
- Benton
- Boone
- Bradley
- Calhoun
- Carroll
- Chicot
- Clark
- Clay
- Cleburne
- Cleveland
- Columbia
- Conway
- Craighead
- Crawford
- Crittenden
- Cross
- Dallas
- Desha
- Drew
- Faulkner
- Franklin
- Fulton
- Garland
- Grant
- Greene
- Hempstead
- Hot Spring
- Howard
- Independence
- Izard
- Jackson
- Jefferson
- Johnson
- Lafayette
- Lawrence
- Lee
- Lincoln
- Little River
- Logan
- Lonoke
- Madison
- Marion
- Miller
- Mississippi
- Monroe
- Montgomery
- Nevada
- Newton
- Ouachita
- Perry
- Phillips
- Pike
- Poinsett
- Polk
- Pope
- Prairie
- Pulaski (Little Rock)
- Randolph
- St. Francis
- Saline
- Scott
- Searcy
- Sebastian
- Sevier
- Sharp
- Stone
- Union
- Van Buren
- Washington
- White
- Woodruff
- Yell

This National Park Service list is complete through NPS recent listings posted December 19, 2025.

== Current listings ==
	Name on the Register	Image	Date listed	Location	City or town	Description
1	Elks Club	Elks Club	July 27, 1979 (#79000445)	67 W. Main St. 34°46′23″N 90°45′36″W	Marianna	
2	Gen. Robert E. Lee Monument	Gen. Robert E. Lee Monument	May 10, 1996 (#96000450)	City Park, roughly bounded by Court, Chestnut, and Main Sts. 34°46′26″N 90°45′25″W	Marianna	
3	Lee County Courthouse	Lee County Courthouse	September 7, 1995 (#95001090)	15 E. Chestnut St. 34°46′28″N 90°45′25″W	Marianna	
4	Lee Grocery Store		February 13, 2020 (#100004897)	100 Main St. 34°18′29″N 90°51′10″W	Elaine	
5	Louisiana Purchase Survey Marker	Louisiana Purchase Survey Marker	February 23, 1972 (#72000206)	Southeast of Blackton at the corner of Monroe and Phillips counties 34°38′48″N 91°03′05″W	Blackton	Extends into Monroe and Phillips counties
6	Marianna Commercial Historic District	Marianna Commercial Historic District	January 4, 2001 (#00001559)	Portions of Chestnut, Liberty, East Columbia, Mississippi, Poplar, Main, Court, and Church Sts. 34°46′25″N 90°45′26″W	Marianna	
7	Marianna Missouri-Pacific Depot	Marianna Missouri-Pacific Depot	August 5, 1994 (#94000827)	S. Carolina St. 34°46′14″N 90°45′39″W	Marianna	
8	Marianna National Guard Armory	Marianna National Guard Armory	January 24, 2007 (#06001267)	45 W. Mississippi St. 34°46′22″N 90°45′32″W	Marianna	
9	Marianna Waterworks	Marianna Waterworks	January 24, 2007 (#06001281)	252 U.S. Route 79; 34°46′36″N 90°45′56″W	Marianna	
10	McClintock House	McClintock House	December 22, 1982 (#82000857)	43 Magnolia; 34°46′30″N 90°45′37″W	Marianna	Designed by Charles L. Thompson.
11	McClintock House	McClintock House	December 28, 1977 (#77000261)	82 W. Main St. 34°45′55″N 90°45′36″W	Marianna	Designed by Charles L. Thompson.
12	John A. Plummer House	John A. Plummer House	June 16, 1998 (#98000646)	269 Pearl St. 34°46′52″N 90°45′43″W	Marianna	

== Former listing ==
	Name on the Register	Image	Date listed	Date removed	Location	City or town	Description
1	Mixon-Evans Barn		November 18, 1999 (#99001349)	June 1, 2005	459 S. Alabama St. and Highway 1 Business, S.	Marianna	

== See also ==
- List of National Historic Landmarks in Arkansas
- National Register of Historic Places listings in Arkansas
