= Barnet Baff =

American businessman

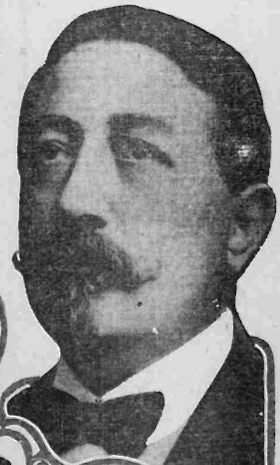
Barnet Baff in the El Paso Herald

Barnet Baff (c. 1863 – November 24, 1914) was a poultry dealer in New York City who was murdered by organized crime, representing the "poultry trust" in New York, that extorted $10 per truckload of poultry from merchants. His death led to an investigation of organized crime in New York City and led to the resignation of Captain John McClintock.

In 1917, Joseph Cohen was convicted of first degree murder, and Abraham "Abie" Graff was convicted of manslaughter in the trial before Justice Tompkins.
