= Bunch Store =

- U.S. National Register of Historic Places
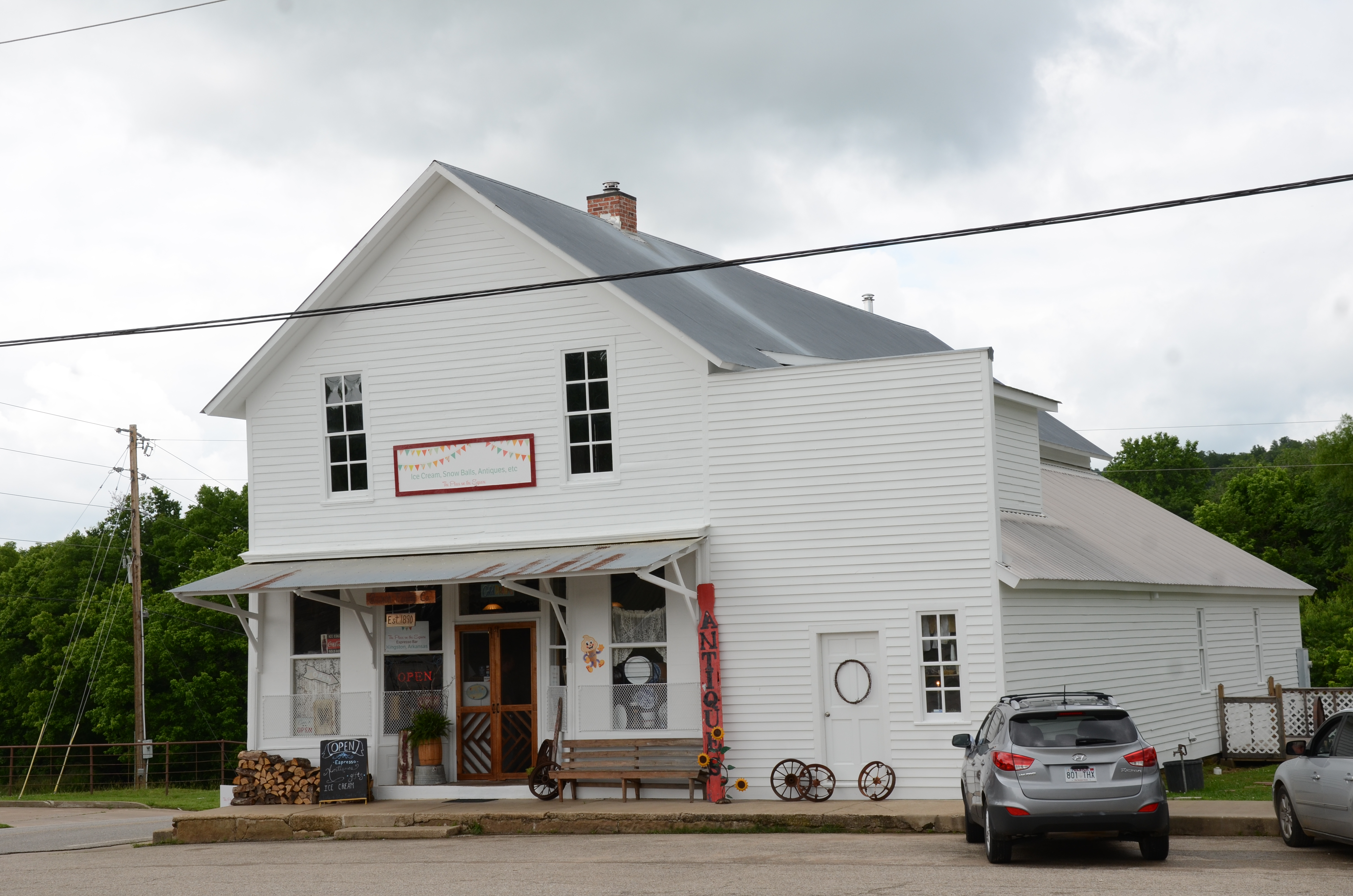

- Location within Arkansas Location within the United States
- Location: 100 Public Square, Kingston, Madison County, Arkansas
- Coordinates: 36°3′3″N 93°31′6″W
- Area: less than one acre
- Built: 1890
- NRHP reference No.: 99001350
- Added to NRHP: November 26, 1999

The Bunch Store is a historic commercial building at 100 Public Square in Kingston, Madison County, Arkansas. It is located at the northwest corner of the main square, and is a two-story wood-frame structure with a gable roof over its left two-thirds, and a flat roof over the remainder. The building is distinctively 6 inches (15 cm) out of plumb, giving it a noticeable tilt, although its doorways and windows are properly square and plumb, suggesting that something occurred during construction to shift the frame of the building. The store was one of the first commercial buildings constructed in the town after the American Civil War, which was effectively destroyed, apparently by marauding bandits, during the war.

The building was listed on the National Register of Historic Places in 1999.

== See also ==
- National Register of Historic Places listings in Madison County, Arkansas
