= Enterprise School =

- U.S. National Register of Historic Places
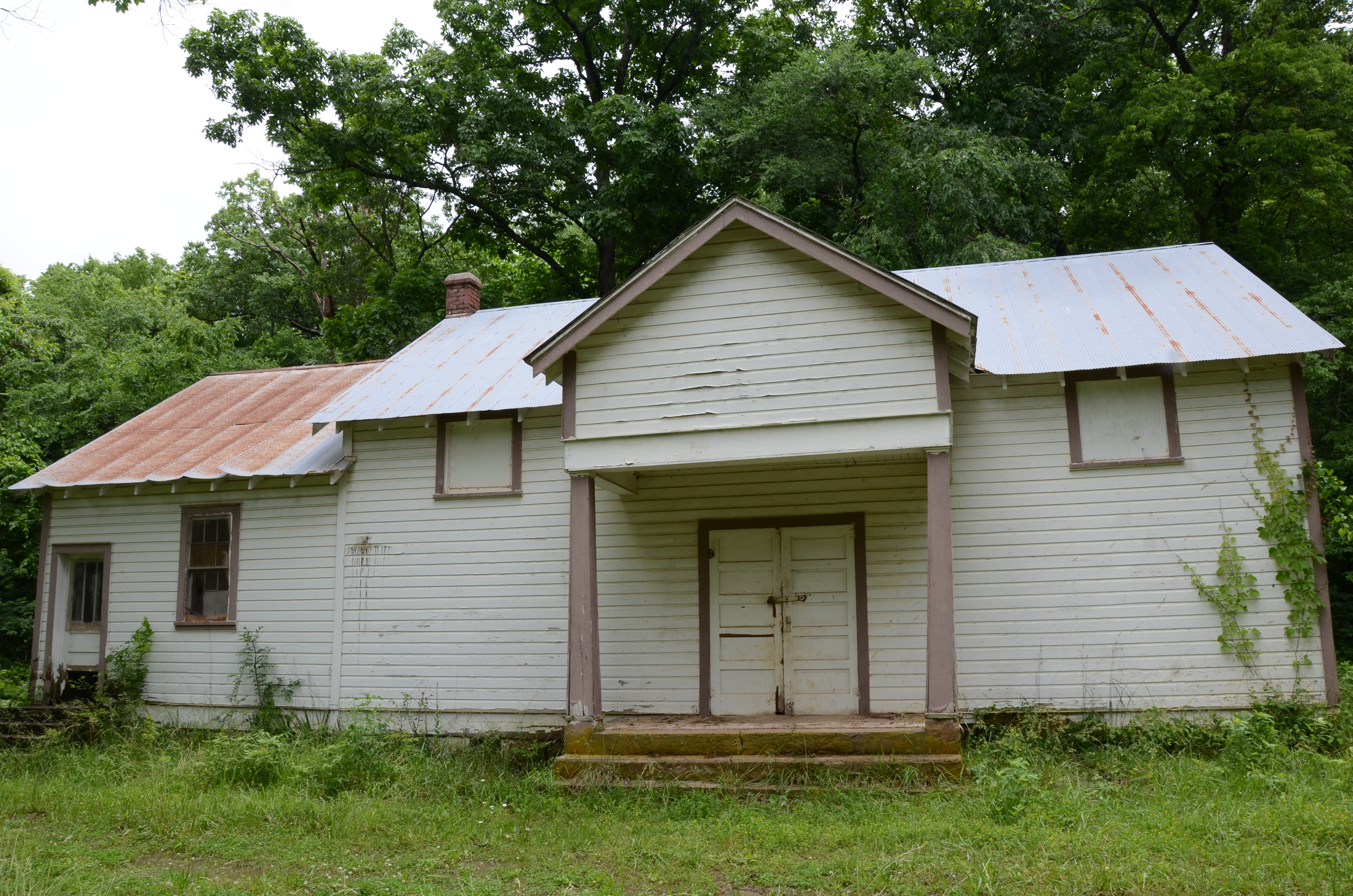

- Location within Arkansas Location within the United States
- Nearest city: Thorney, Arkansas
- Coordinates: 35°59′17″N 93°55′27″W
- Area: less than one acre
- Architectural style: Colonial Revival, Bungalow/craftsman
- MPS: Public Schools in the Ozarks MPS
- NRHP reference No.: 92001192
- Added to NRHP: September 10, 1992

The Enterprise School is a historic school building in rural central-western Madison County, Arkansas. It is located at the junction of County Roads 6041 and 192. It is a single-story wood-frame structure, basically rectangular in shape, with a metal roof, weatherboard siding, and a concrete foundation. Its roof has exposed rafter ends in the Craftsman style, and it has a double-door entry sheltered by a gabled porch supported by sloping posts. Built about 1935, its construction was probably funded by a Depression-era jobs program.

The building was listed on the National Register of Historic Places in 1992.

== See also ==
- National Register of Historic Places listings in Madison County, Arkansas
