= Marianna Waterworks =

- U.S. National Register of Historic Places
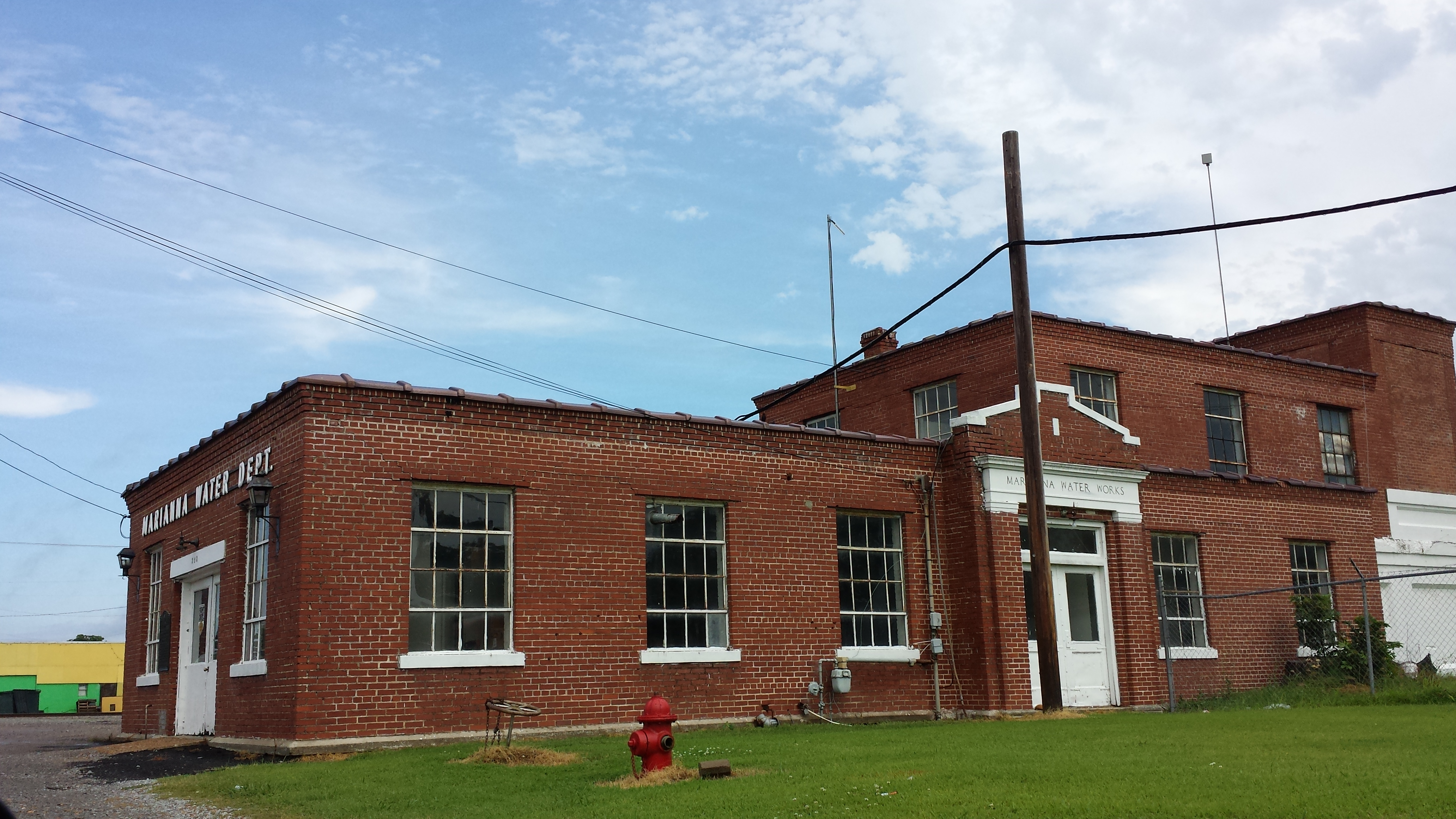

- Location within Arkansas Location within the United States
- Location: 252 US 79, Marianna, Arkansas
- Coordinates: 34°46′36″N 90°45′56″W
- Area: less than one acre
- Built: 1930
- Architectural style: Classical Revival
- MPS: New Deal Recovery Efforts in Arkansas MPS
- NRHP reference No.: 06001281
- Added to NRHP: January 24, 2007

The Marianna Waterworks are located at 252 United States Route 79 in Marianna, Arkansas. The facilities at this location include an office building, two clear wells, one wellhouse, an aeration chamber, a water wheel, and a c. 1980 brick outbuilding and steel watertower. The main office building was built in 1936–37 with funding from the Public Works Administration, a Depression-era jobs program, while many of the other facilities were built c. 1930. The office building is a rambling T-shaped structure, with sections that are either one or two stories in height. It is built of red brick in the then-popular Spanish Revival style.

The facility was listed on the National Register of Historic Places in 2007.

== See also ==
- National Register of Historic Places listings in Lee County, Arkansas
