= St. Paul School Building =

- U.S. National Register of Historic Places
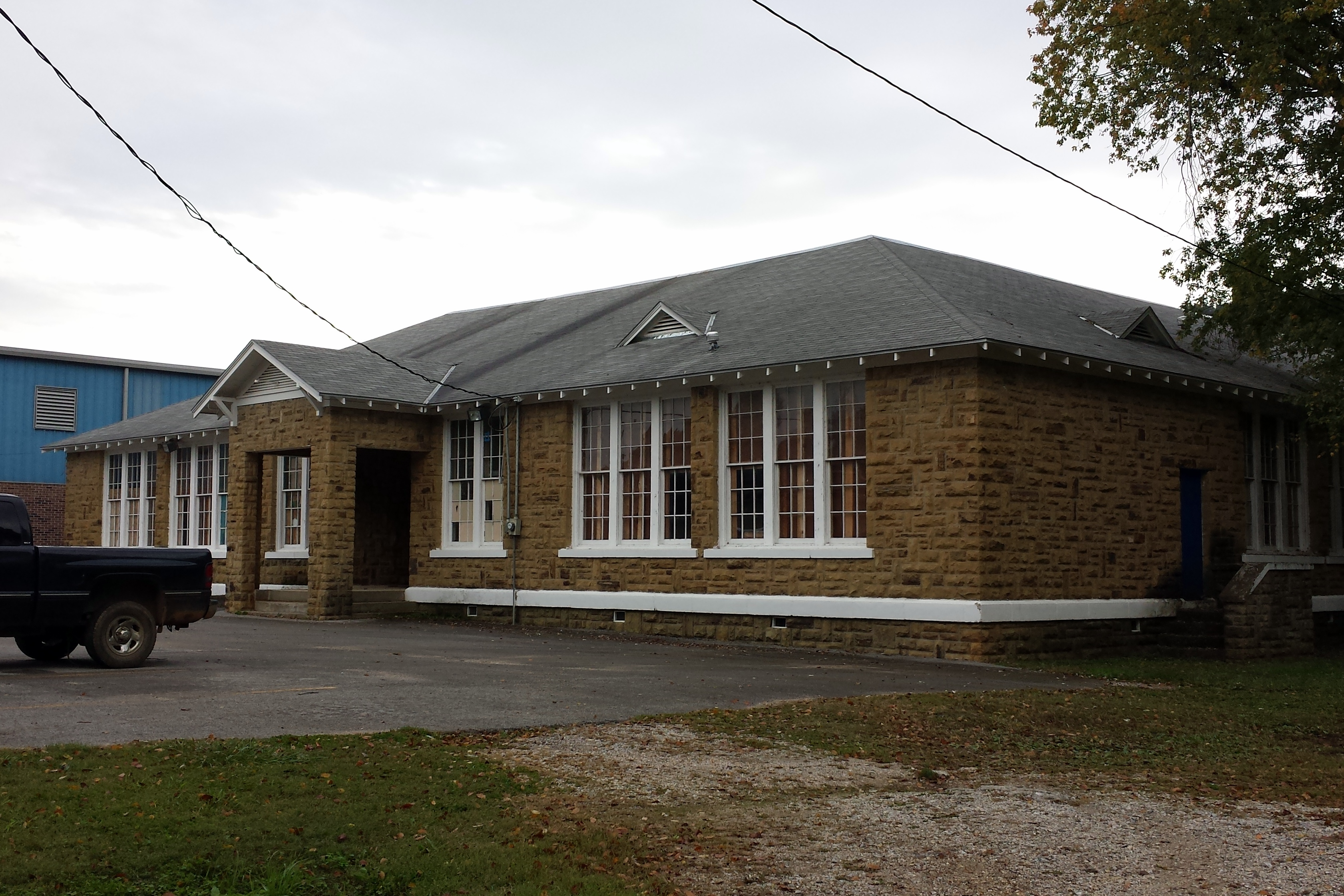

- Location within Arkansas Location within the United States
- Location: 200 W 4th St., St. Paul, Arkansas
- Coordinates: 35°49′29″N 93°45′59″W
- Area: less than one acre
- Built: 1939
- Built by: Works Progress Administration
- Architect: T. Ewing Shelton
- Architectural style: Bungalow/American Craftsman
- MPS: Public Schools in the Ozarks MPS
- NRHP reference No.: 06000416
- Added to NRHP: May 24, 2006

The St. Paul School Building is a historic school building at 200 West 4th Street in St. Paul, Arkansas. It is a single-story masonry structure, built out of local sandstone. It has gable-on-hip roof, with a shed-roof addition to the rear. Two small triangular louvered vent dormers flank the projecting entry porch. The school was built in 1940 with funding from the Works Progress Administration, and serves as a community meeting place as well as school.

The building was listed on the National Register of Historic Places in 2006.

== See also ==
- National Register of Historic Places listings in Madison County, Arkansas
