= John A. Plummer House =

Historic house in Arkansas, United States

- U.S. National Register of Historic Places
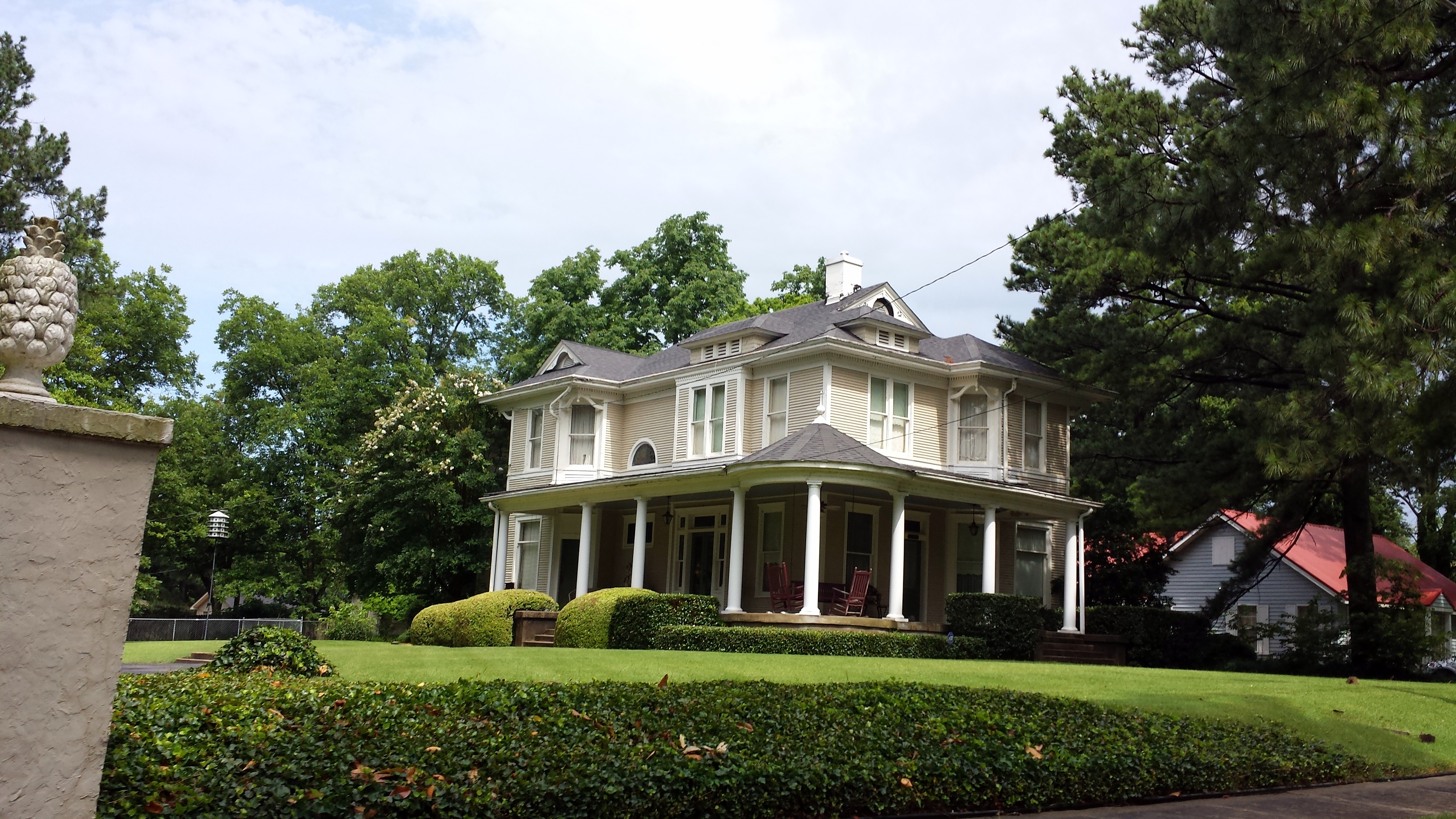

- Location within Arkansas Location within the United States
- Location: 269 Pearl St., Marianna, Arkansas
- Coordinates: 34°46′52″N 90°45′43″W
- Area: 1.1 acres (0.45 ha)
- Built: 1900
- Architectural style: Queen Anne, Colonial Revival
- NRHP reference No.: 98000646
- Added to NRHP: June 16, 1998

The John A. Plummer House is a historic house at 259 Pearl Street in Marianna, Arkansas. It is a two-story wood-frame structure, built c. 1900 for John Plummer, owner of a local hardware store who served four terms as county judge, and briefly as mayor of Marianna. The house is an excellent local example of a transitional Queen Anne-Colonial Revival structure, with a gingerbread-decorated wraparound porch, and numerous projections and roof dormers.

The house was listed on the National Register of Historic Places in 1998.

== See also ==
- National Register of Historic Places listings in Lee County, Arkansas
