= Bank of Kingston =

Historic building in Arkansas, U.S.

- U.S. National Register of Historic Places
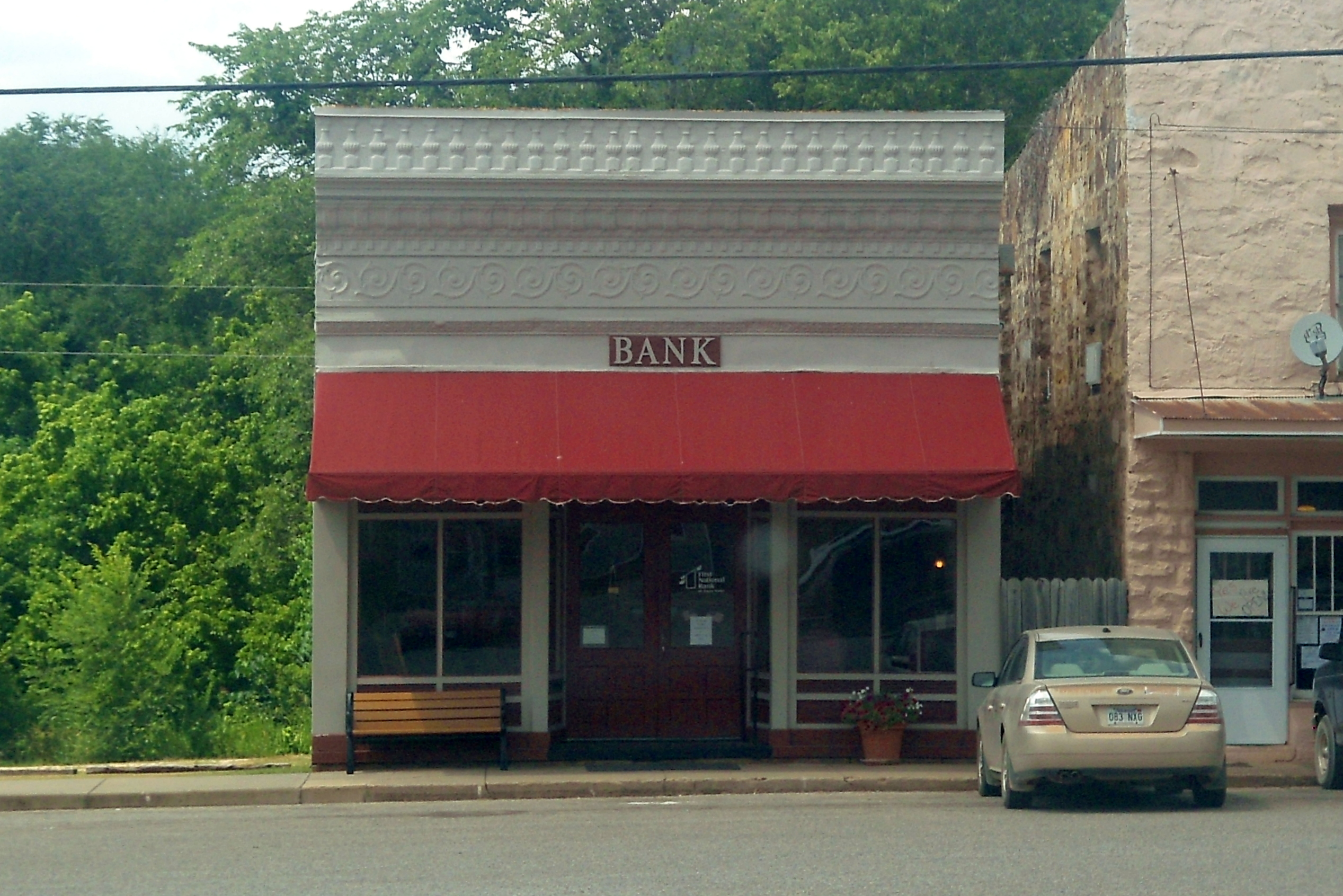

- Location within Arkansas Location within the United States
- Location: 101 Public Square, Kingston, Madison County, Arkansas
- Coordinates: 36°3′3″N 93°31′2″W
- Area: less than one acre
- Built: 1911
- NRHP reference No.: 82002122
- Added to NRHP: March 25, 1982

The Bank of Kingston is a historic commercial building at 101 Public Square in Kingston, Madison County, Arkansas. It is a single-story stone structure, built in 1911, notable for the use of pressed metal (provided by the noted Mesker Brothers of St. Louis, Missouri) on three sides. The most elaborate treatment is on the main facade, which has a richly decorated frieze, cornice, and parapet above the relatively conventional storefront. The east and west sidewalls of the building have a pressed metal veneer shaped in imitation of stonework. The interior of the building, restored in the early 1980s, has also retained rich details. The building is the architecturally finest commercial building in the small community.

The building was listed on the National Register of Historic Places in 1982.

== See also ==
- National Register of Historic Places listings in Madison County, Arkansas
