= John McClintock =

John McClintock may refer to:

- John McClintock (police commissioner) (1874–?), Police Commissioner of New York City
- John McClintock (1743–1799), Irish MP for Enniskillen 1783–1790, for Belturbet 1790–1797
- John McClintock (theologian) (1814–1870), American Methodist Episcopal theologian and educationalist
- John McClintock, 1st Baron Rathdonnell (1798–1879), Irish peer and Conservative Member of Parliament
- John McClintock (1770–1855), Irish MP for Athlone 1820, for County Louth 1830–31
- John McClintock (Royal Navy officer) (1874–1929), British admiral
