= Marianna City Hall =

- Marianna National Guard Armory
- U.S. National Register of Historic Places
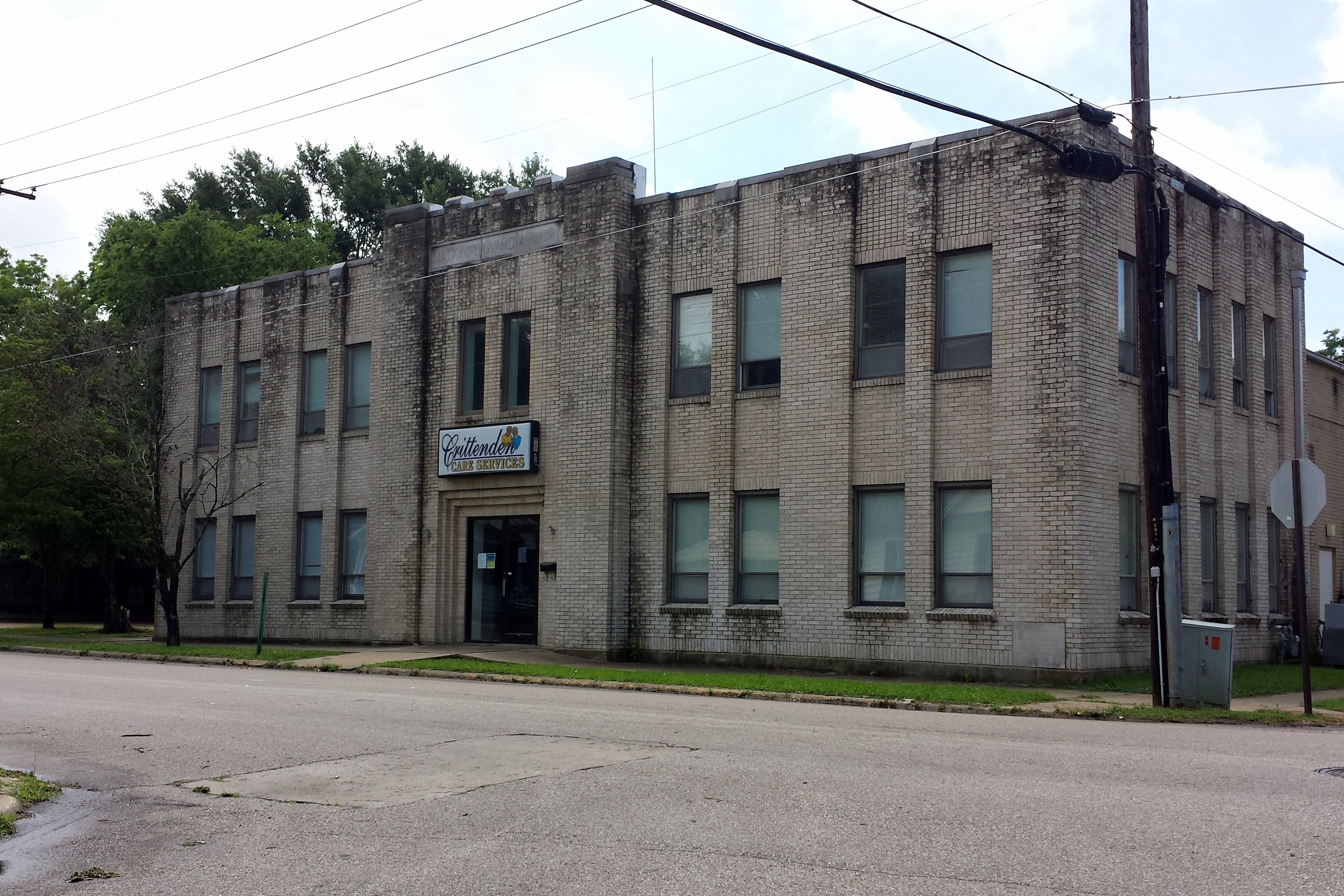

- Location within Arkansas Location within the United States
- Location: 45 W. Mississippi St., Marianna, Arkansas
- Coordinates: 34°46′22″N 90°45′32″W
- Area: less than one acre
- Built: 1929
- Built by: Walter M. Vernon
- Architect: Durward F. Kyle;
- Architectural style: Art Deco
- NRHP reference No.: 06001267
- Added to NRHP: January 24, 2007

Marianna City Hall is located in the former Marianna National Guard Armory at 45 West Mississippi Street in Marianna, Arkansas. It is a large two-story brick building, with restrained Art Deco styling. It was designed by Durward F. Kyle, and built in 1929 with funding from the city and the state's Military Department, to house the regimental headquarters of the 206th Coastal Artillery Regiment. Over the following decades it was home to a number of Arkansas National Guard units, which moved to new facilities in 1980. The building was adapted in 1987 for use as city hall, and as a senior center.

The building was listed on the National Register of Historic Places in 2007.

== See also ==
- National Register of Historic Places listings in Lee County, Arkansas
