= St. Paul High School (Arkansas) =

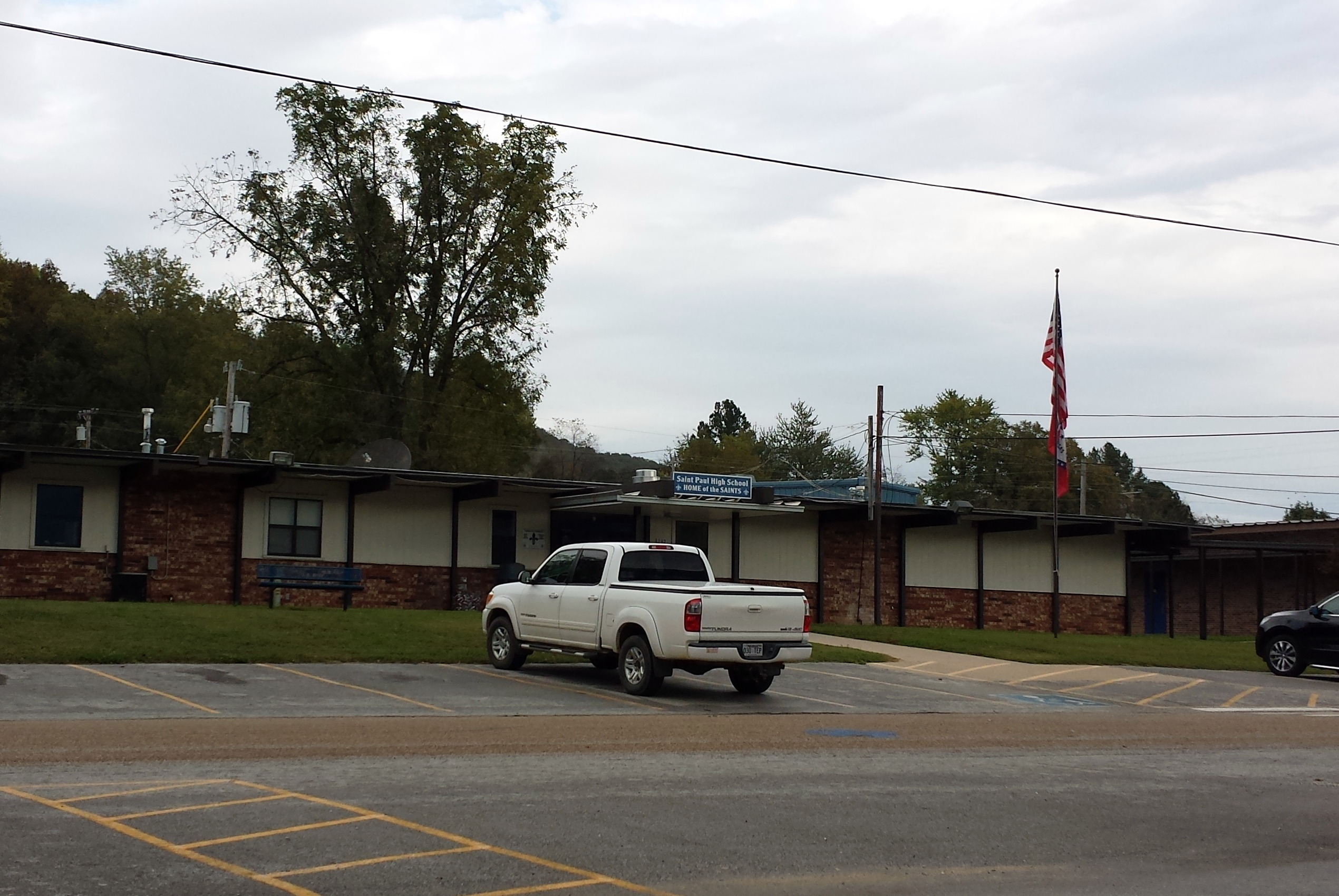

Location
- 232 4th Street; St. Paul, Arkansas 72760; United States; 35°49′24″N 93°45′56″W

Information
- School type: Public comprehensive
- Status: Open
- School district: Huntsville School District (2004-); St. Paul School District (-2004)
- CEEB code: 042210
- NCES School ID: 050813001035
- Teaching staff: 15.47 (on an FTE basis)
- Grades: 7–12
- Enrollment: 107 (2023–2024)
- Student to teacher ratio: 6.92
- Education system: ADE Smart Core
- Classes offered: Regular, Advanced Placement (AP)
- Campus type: Rural
- Colors: Royal blue and white
- Athletics conference: 1A 1 West (2012–14)
- Sports: Basketball, baseball, softball
- Mascot: Saint
- Team name: St. Paul Saints
- Accreditation: ADE
- Affiliation: Arkansas Activities Association
- Website: www.huntsvilleschooldistrict.org/o/sphs

St. Paul High School (SPHS) is an accredited comprehensive public high school located in St. Paul, Arkansas, United States. SPHS provides secondary education for more than 250 students in grades 7 through 12. It is one of three public high schools in Madison County and one of two high schools administered by the Huntsville School District.

== History ==
It was a part of the St. Paul School District until July 1, 2004, when that district was merged into the Huntsville School District.

== Academics ==
St. Paul High School is a Title I school that is accredited by the Arkansas Department of Education (ADE). The assumed course of study follows the ADE Smart Core curriculum, which requires students complete at least 22 units prior to graduation. Students complete regular coursework and exams and may take Advanced Placement (AP) courses and exam with the opportunity to receive college credit.

== Athletics ==
The St. Paul High School mascot for academic and athletic teams are the Saints with royal blue and white serving as the school colors.

The St. Paul Saints compete in interscholastic activities within the 1A Classification, the state's second smallest classification administered by the Arkansas Activities Association. For 2012–14, the Saints play within the 1A 1 West Conference. St. Paul fields varsity teams in; bowling (boys/girls), cheer, basketball(girls/boys), track and field (boys/girls).
