= Huntsville Commercial Historic District =

Historic district in Arkansas, United States

- U.S. National Register of Historic Places
- U.S. Historic district
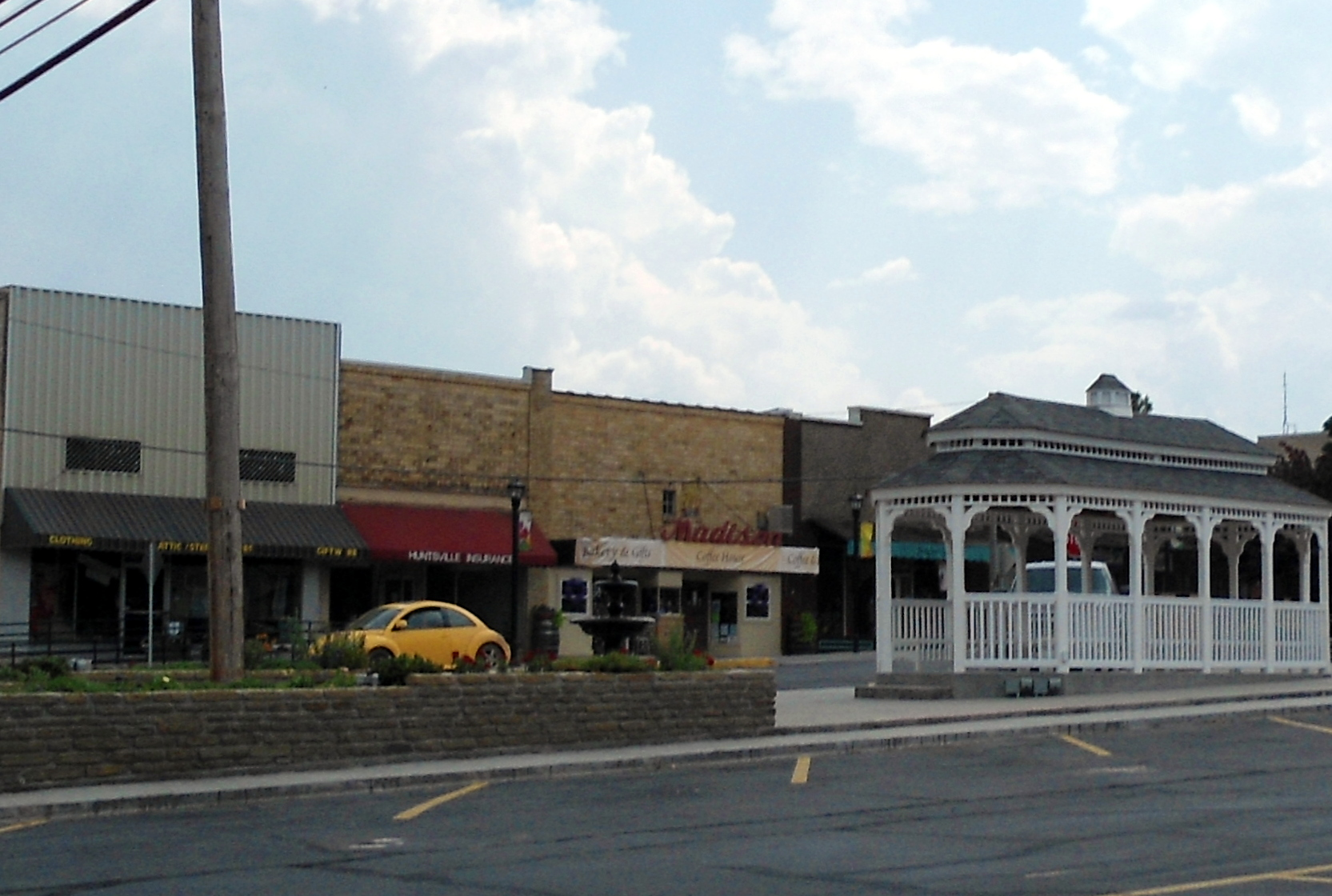

- Location within Arkansas Location within the United States
- Location: Roughly bounded by War Eagle, Hughes, Church, and Harris St., Huntsville, Arkansas
- Coordinates: 36°5′22″N 93°44′8″W
- Area: 7.3 acres (3.0 ha)
- Built: 1939
- Architect: Jones, Fay
- Architectural style: Early Commercial, Art Deco
- NRHP reference No.: 08000705
- Added to NRHP: July 24, 2008

The Huntsville Commercial Historic District encompasses the historic elements of the business district of Huntsville, Arkansas, the county seat of Madison County. It covers an area three blocks by two, extending east–west between Hughes and Harris Streets, and north–south between War Eagle and Church Streets. Most of the buildings in the district were built after fires swept through the town in 1902 and 1925, although the Madison County Courthouse is an Art Deco structure built in 1939. The district includes 32 historically significant buildings.

The district was listed on the National Register of Historic Places in 2008.

== See also ==
- National Register of Historic Places listings in Madison County, Arkansas
