= Madison County Courthouse (Arkansas) =

- U.S. National Register of Historic Places
- U.S. Historic district – Contributing property
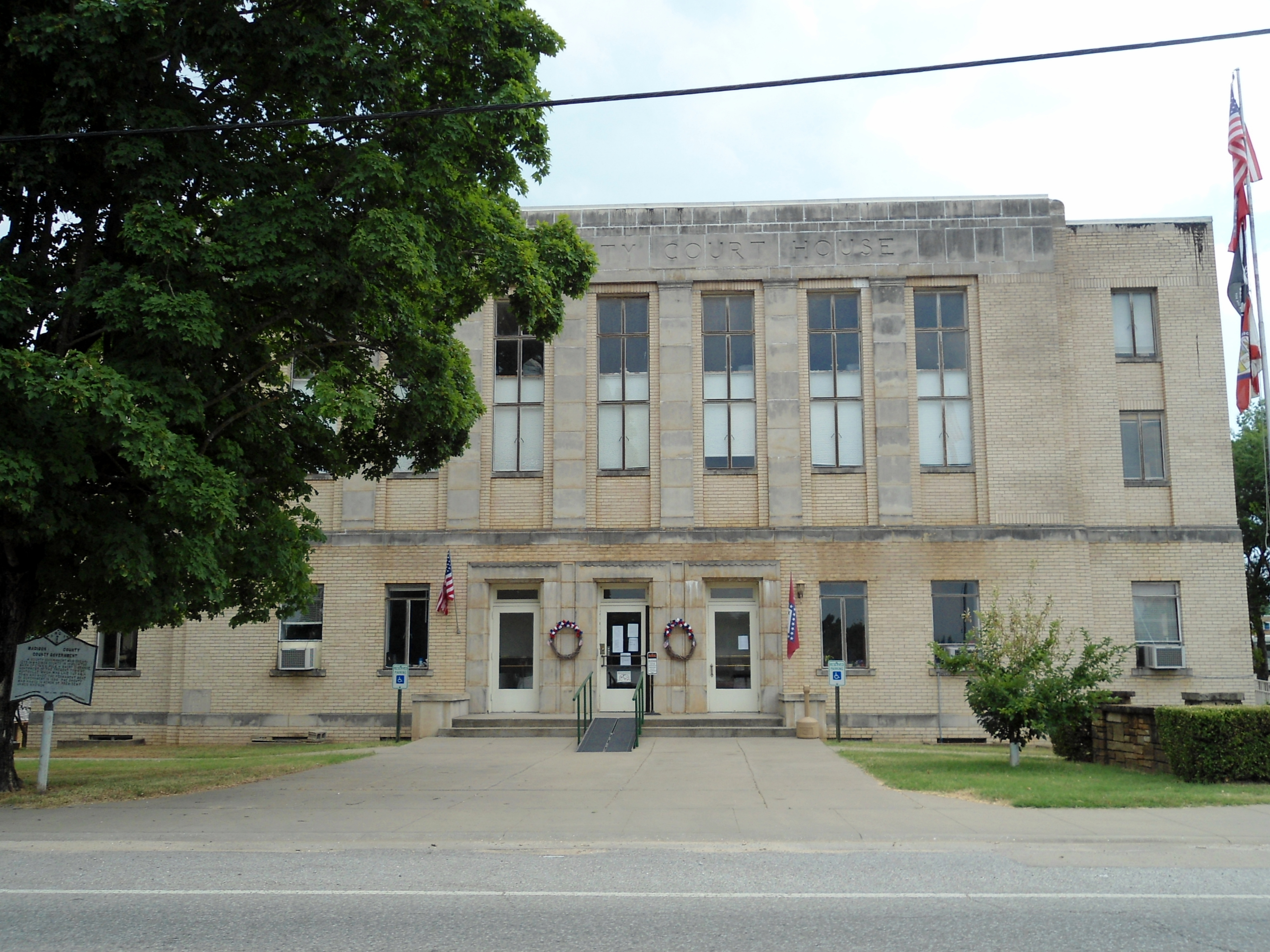

- Location within Arkansas Location within the United States
- Location: 1 Main Street; Huntsville, Arkansas
- Coordinates: 36°5′14″N 93°44′11″W
- Area: less than one acre
- Built: 1939
- Built by: Federal Emergency Administration
- Architect: T. Ewing Shelton; E. Chester Nelson
- Architectural style: Art Deco
- Part of: Huntsville Commercial Historic District (ID93001253)
- NRHP reference No.: 93001253

Significant dates
- Added to NRHP: November 19, 1993
- Designated CP: November 19, 1993

The Madison County Courthouse is a courthouse in Huntsville, Arkansas, the county seat of Madison County, built in 1939 by the Federal Emergency Administration of Public Works (FEA). It is a three-story masonry structure, its exterior finished in glazed brick with limestone trim. It has restrained Art Deco styling, including pilasters between its central window bays, and blocky limestone archways framing its entrances. It was built in 1939 with funding from the Federal Emergency Administration, and is the city's finest example of Art Deco architecture. Located within the Huntsville Commercial Historic District, the courthouse is a culturally significant landmark for both its architectural style and historical importance because of its association with the FEA. It was because of this dual significance that the property was listed on the National Register of Historic Places in 1993.

== History ==
Madison County was formed on September 30, 1836, from Washington County, with county government first established in a barn near Huntsville. A log courthouse was built on the public square following the settlement's official designation as county seat on July 22, 1839. The 900-square-foot (84 m^{2}) single-room building cost $150 ($4,535.16 today). A new, two-story brick structure was built in 1845 but was burned by Union soldiers in 1863 during the Civil War. The county incurred a $16,000 ($430,000 today) debt building a new structure in 1871. This structure only served seven years before being burned accidentally. In 1881, another brick courthouse was completed, but only lasted nine years before another fire destroyed the building. Madison County relocated to the northwest corner of the square into a native stone building in 1905. The courthouse served until the 1930s when repairs to the roof were deemed sufficiently expensive that it was preferable to build a new building rather than rehabilitate the undersized structure.

The FEA of Public Works announced plans to construct a new courthouse at 1 Main Street in 1939. Following voter approval, three houses were purchased and moved in order to build the new structure. The FEA approved a budget of $90,090 ($2,085,000 today) for the project. Dedicated November 1939, Clyde T. Ellis gave a speech dedicating the building. Future governor Orval Faubus served as circuit clerk in the courthouse shortly after its completion.

== See also ==
- National Register of Historic Places listings in Madison County, Arkansas
