= Huntsville School District =

School district in Arkansas, United States

Address
- 570 West Main Huntsville, AR Madison County, Arkansas, Arkansas, 72740; United States

District information
- Type: Public School District
- Motto: Student Centered, Student Focused
- Grades: Pre-K - 12
- Superintendent: Jay Chalk
- Chair of the board: Whitney Comer
- Budget: $33.1 Million (FY 2019-20)

Students and staff
- Students: 2,182 (2020-21)
- District mascot: Eagle / Saints

Other information
- Website: www.huntsvilleschooldistrict.org

Huntsville School District (formally Huntsville School District 1) is a public school district based in Huntsville, Madison County, Arkansas. The school district is the 3rd largest school district in Arkansas by area served, encompassing 747 square miles. This district and its schools are accredited by AdvancED.

As of the 2021–2022 school year, the district's 6 schools have a total enrollment of 2,228 students.

In addition to Huntsville, within Madison County, the district includes Hindsville, St. Paul, and Wesley. The district extends into Franklin County.

== Merger ==
On July 1, 2004, the St. Paul School District was merged into the Huntsville School District.

== List of Schools ==
=== Secondary education ===
The Huntsville School District provides education programs for students in two facilities.

- Huntsville High School–serving students in grades 9-12
- St. Paul High School–serving students in grades 7-12

=== Middle school ===
The district operates two middle schools.

- Huntsville Middle School–serving students in grades 6-8
- St. Paul Elementary–serving students in grades K-6

=== Elementary and early childhood education ===
Three educational facilities make up the district's elementary and early childhood programs

- Watson Primary School–serving students in grades K-2
- Huntsville Intermediate School–serving students in grades 3-5
- St. Paul Elementary–serving students in grades K-6

== Administration ==
The Huntsville School District Board of Education consists of seven members. The members of the board meet regularly on the second Monday of each month at 7 pm Central Time in the Huntsville School District Administration Building and district schools.
