= John McClintock (police official) =

American police commissioner

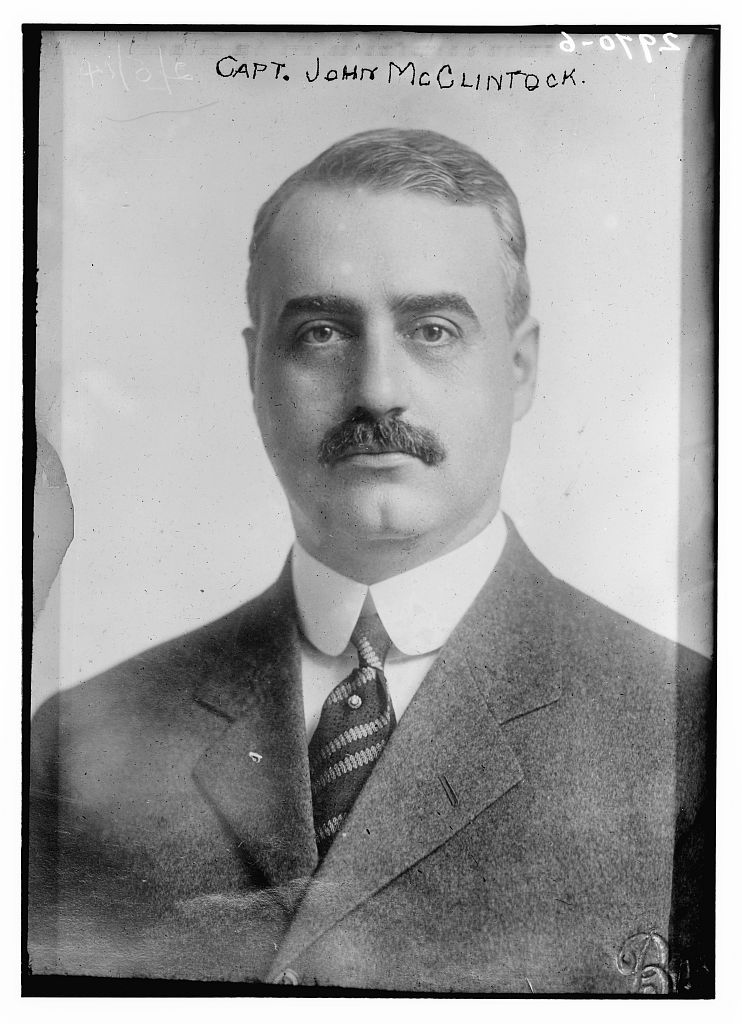
McClintock in c. 1910-1915.

Captain John McClintock (1874–?) was the deputy Police Commissioner of New York City.

== Biography ==
McClintock was born in 1874 to Emory McClintock of the Mutual Life Insurance Company. He attended Berkeley School, Columbia University, and the New York University School of Law.

McClintock's United States Army service began in the Spanish–American War. Frank Swett Black appointed him a major in the 203rd New York Volunteers. He was appointed by Douglas Imrie McKay as a First Deputy Police Commissioner of New York City on February 1, 1914. Later that year on December 15, he resigned in the aftermath of the killing of Barnet Baff.
