= J. M. McClintock House =

Historic house in Arkansas, United States

- McClintock House
- U.S. National Register of Historic Places
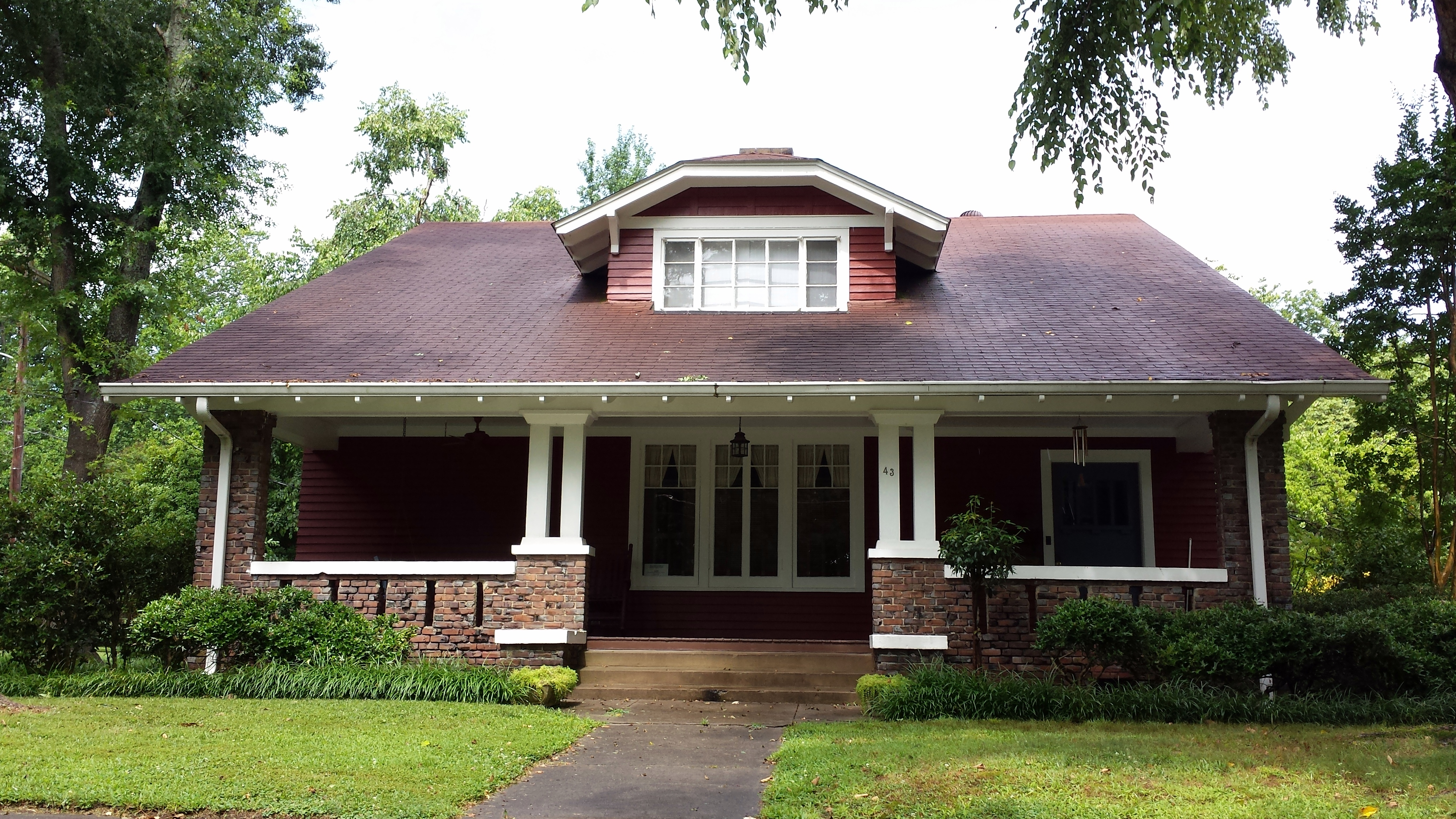

- Location within Arkansas Location within the United States
- Location: 43 Magnolia, Marianna, Arkansas
- Coordinates: 34°46′30″N 90°45′37″W
- Area: less than one acre
- Built: 1912
- Architect: Charles L. Thompson
- Architectural style: Bungalow/American Craftsman
- MPS: Thompson, Charles L., Design Collection TR
- NRHP reference No.: 82000857
- Added to NRHP: December 22, 1982

The J. M. McClintock House is a historic house at 43 Magnolia Street in Marianna, Arkansas. It is a 1 1/2-story wood-frame structure, designed by Charles L. Thompson and built in 1912, whose Craftsman/Bungalow styling is in marked contrast to the W.S. McClintock House, a Colonial Revival structure designed by Thompson for another member of the McClintock family and built the same year. This house has the broad sweeping roof line with exposed rafters covering a porch supported by brick piers and paired wooden box posts on either side of the centered stair. A dormer with clipped-gable roof is centered above the entry.

The house was listed on the National Register of Historic Places in 1982.

== See also ==
- W. S. McClintock House, at 83 Main St., also designed by Thompson and NRHP-listed
- National Register of Historic Places listings in Lee County, Arkansas
