= William McClintock =

William McClintock can refer to:

- William McClintock-Bunbury (1800–1866), Irish naval commander and politician
- Sir William McLintock, 1st Baronet, Scottish accountant
- William McClintock (English cricketer) (1896–1946), English cricketer
- William McClintock (Irish cricketer) (born 1997), Irish cricketer
- William C. McClintock, American newspaper editor and publisher
