= W.S. McClintock House =

Historic house in Arkansas, United States

- McClintock House
- U.S. National Register of Historic Places
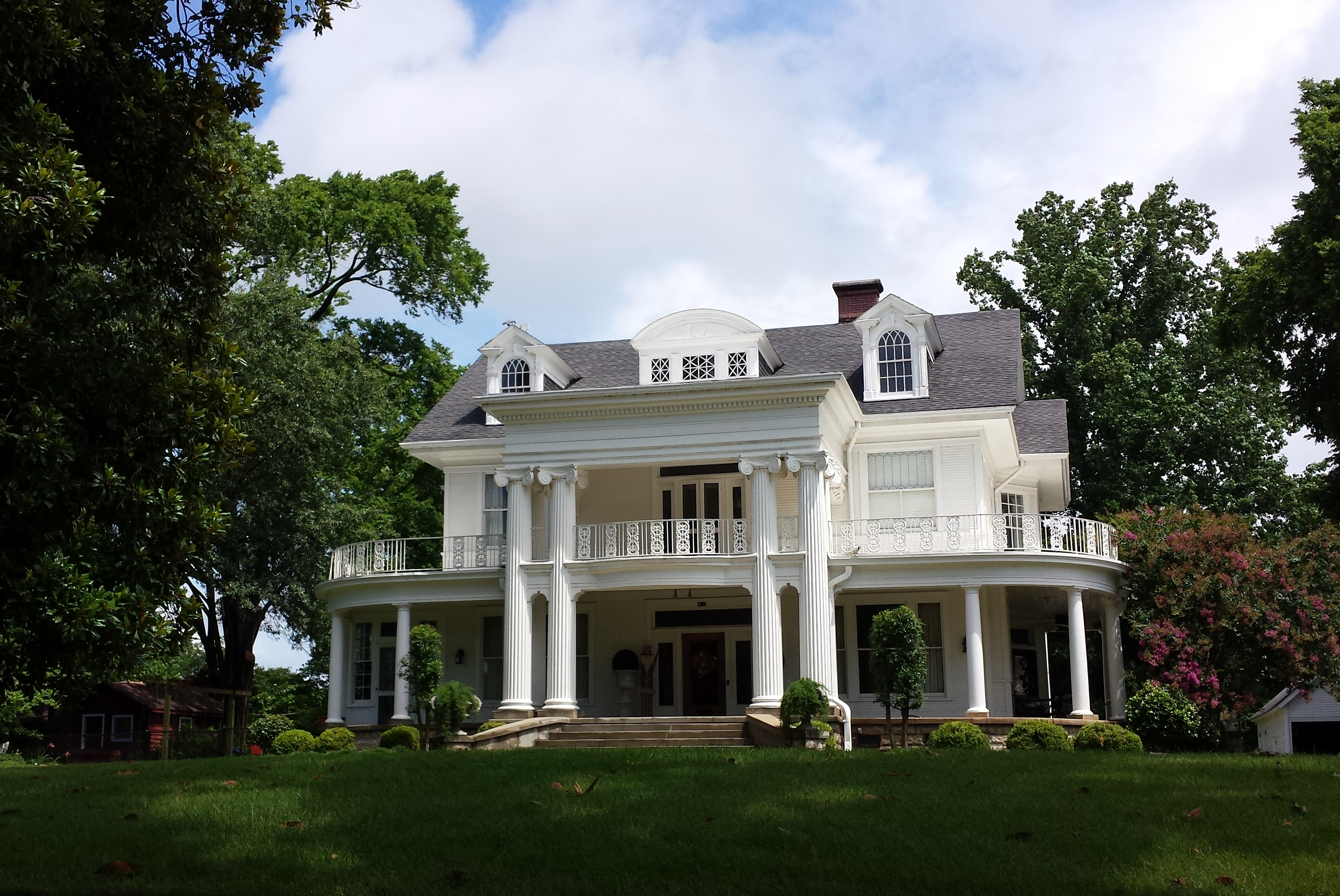

- Location within Arkansas Location within the United States
- Location: 82 W. Main St., Marianna, Arkansas
- Coordinates: 34°45′55″N 90°45′36″W
- Built: 1912
- Architect: Charles L. Thompson
- Architectural style: Classical Revival
- NRHP reference No.: 77000261
- Added to NRHP: December 28, 1977

The W.S. McClintock House is a historic house at 83 West Main Street in Marianna, Arkansas. It is a grand two-story wood-frame Classical Revival building designed by Charles L. Thompson and built in 1912. The symmetrical main facade has at its center a massive two-story portico supported by groups of Ionic columns, with a dentillated cornice and a flat roof. A single-story porch extends from both sides of this portico, supported by Doric columns, and wrapping around to the sides of the house. This porch is topped by an ironwork railing.

The house was listed on the National Register of Historic Places in 1977.

== See also ==
- J. M. McClintock House, at 43 Main St., also designed by Thompson and NRHP-listed
- National Register of Historic Places listings in Lee County, Arkansas
