= McClintock Hall =

- U.S. National Register of Historic Places
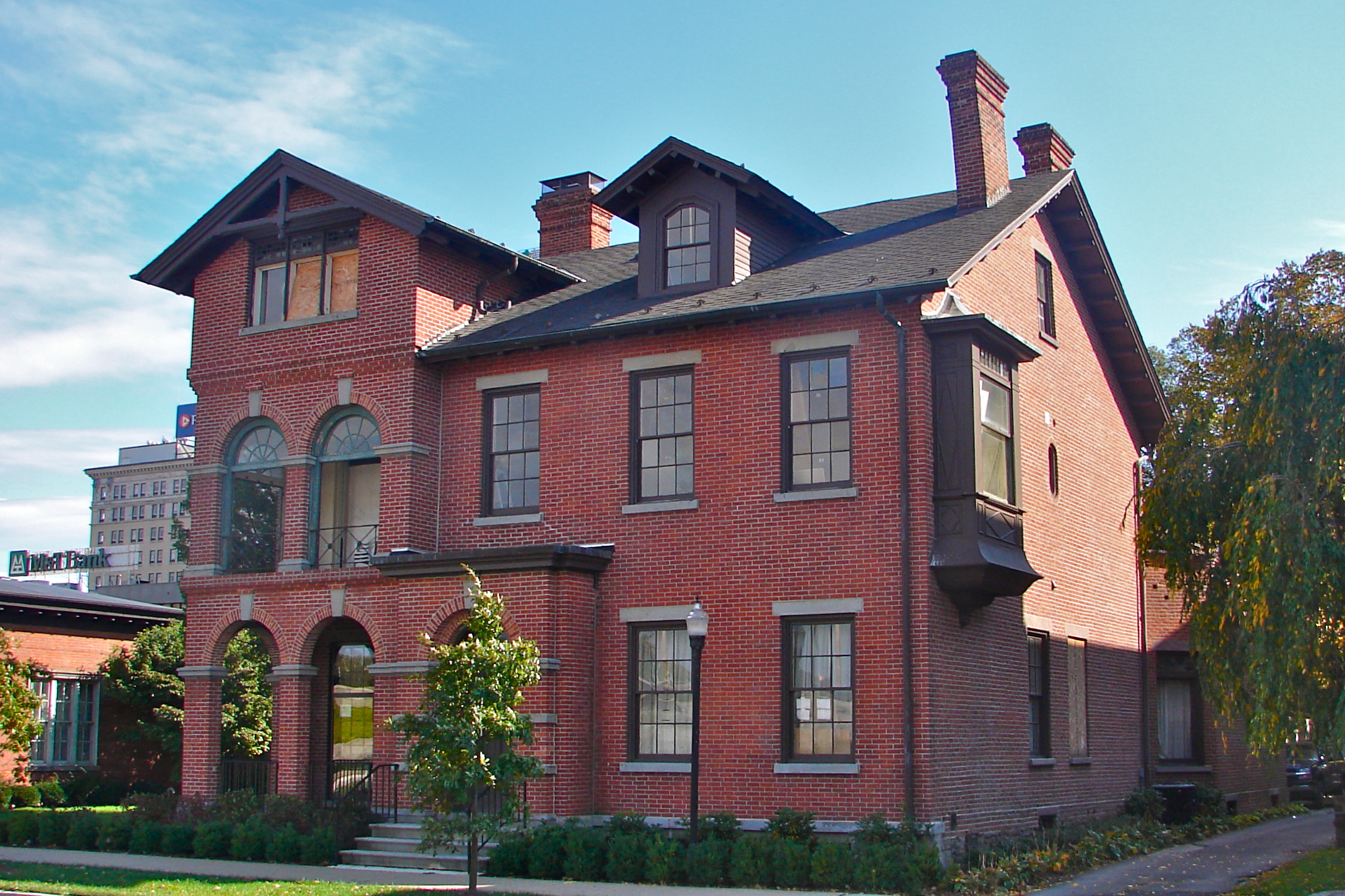
- McClintock Hall, October 2011

- Location within Pennsylvania Location within the United States
- Location: 44 S. River St., Wilkes-Barre, Pennsylvania
- Coordinates: 41°14′52″N 75°53′5″W
- Area: 8 acres (3.2 ha)
- Built: c. 1841
- Built by: Withers, F.C.
- Architectural style: Greek Revival
- NRHP reference No.: 72001133
- Added to NRHP: March 16, 1972

McClintock Hall, also known as McClintock House, is an historic dormitory that is located on the campus of Wilkes University in Wilkes-Barre, Luzerne County, Pennsylvania, United States.

It was added to the National Register of Historic Places in 1972.

== History and architectural features ==
Built circa 1841, and is a two-and-one-half-story, rectangular brick building that was designed in the Greek Revival style. It was renovated in 1863, creating its present appearance. Built as the McClintock family residence, it was used as such into the 1950s, after which it was acquired by Wilkes College and used as a residence hall.
