= T. B. McClintic (boarding tug) =

- T. B. McCLINTIC
- U.S. National Register of Historic Places
- Location within New Brunswick
- Location: St. Andrews, New Brunswick, Canada
- Coordinates: 45°04′15″N 67°03′02″W
- Area: less than one acre
- Built: 1932
- Built by: Bath Iron Works
- NRHP reference No.: 94000532
- Added to NRHP: June 3, 1994

T. B. McClintic, also known as the Atlantic IV, is a historic quarantine boarding tug located at St. Andrews, New Brunswick, Canada. She was built in 1932 by the Bath Iron Works for the U.S. Public Health Service. The vessel is 60 feet 10 inches (18.54 m) in length overall with a 16.5-foot (5.0 m) breadth and a 9.2-foot (2.8 m) draft. For most of her service, she was stationed at the Baltimore Quarantine Station in Baltimore, Maryland. In 1961, the City of Wilmington, North Carolina acquired the ship for use as a fireboat and renamed her the Atlantic IV. She was sold to a private party in 1985.

It was added to the National Register of Historic Places in 1994.
