= McClinton =

McClinton is a surname. Notable people with the surname include:

- Curtis McClinton (born 1939), American football player
- Delbert McClinton (born 1940), American musician
- Jack McClinton (born 1985), American basketball player
- James McClinton (born 1961), American politician
- Lita McClinton (1953–1987), American murder victim
- Kenny McClinton (born 1947), Northern Irish pastor and political activist
- Marion McClinton (1954–2019), American theater director
- O. B. McClinton (1940–1987), American singer-songwriter

== See also ==
- McClinton Glacier, glacier in Antarctica
- McClintock (disambiguation)
