= St. Paul, Arkansas =

- Town
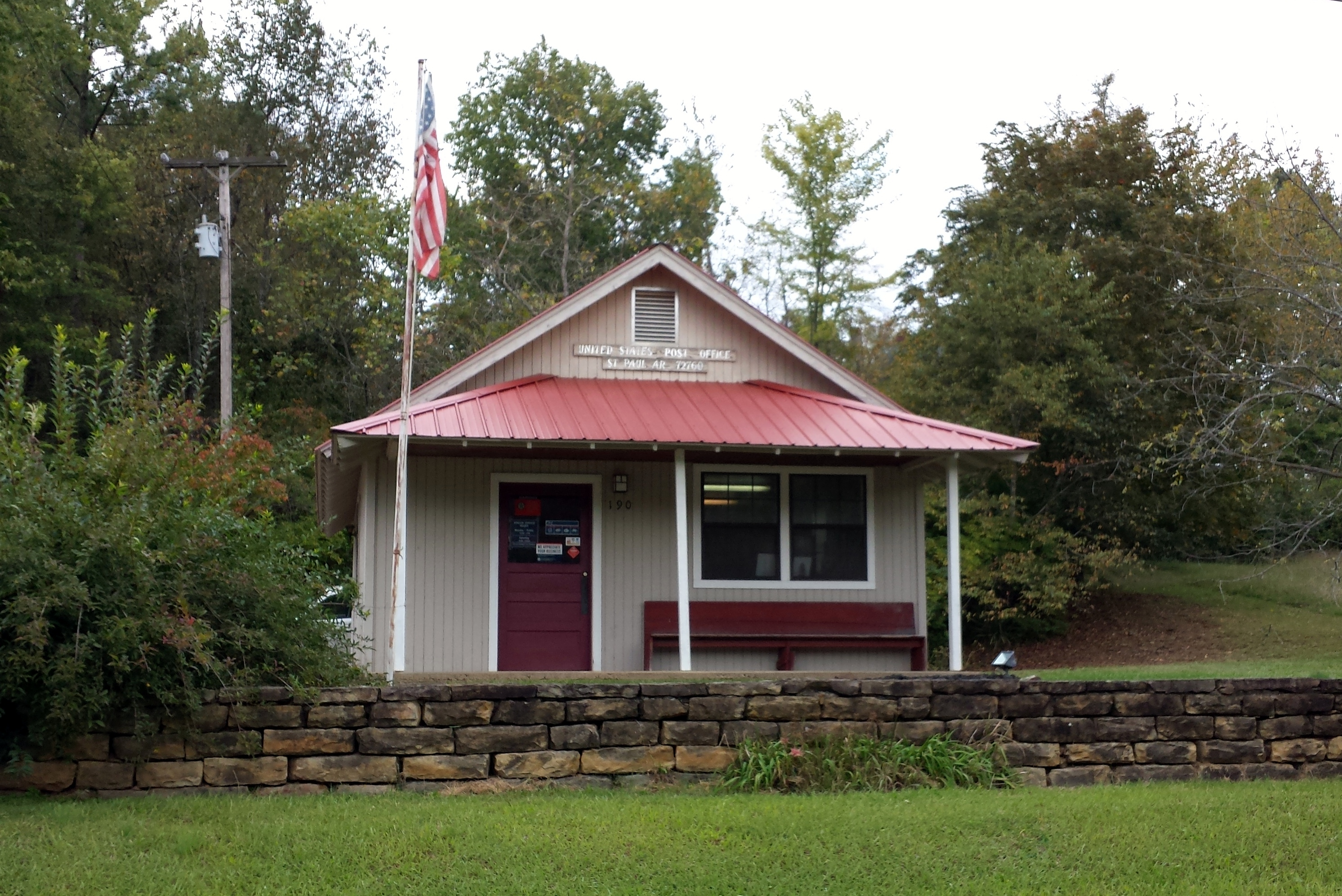
- St. Paul post office

- Location in Madison County, Arkansas
- Coordinates: 35°49′28″N 93°45′51″W
- Country: United States
- State: Arkansas
- County: Madison

Government
  - Mayor: Nina Selz

Area
  - Total: 0.46 sq mi (1.18 km^{2})
  - Land: 0.46 sq mi (1.18 km^{2})
  - Water: 0 sq mi (0.00 km^{2})
- Elevation: 1,519 ft (463 m)

Population (2020)
  - Total: 111
  - Estimate (2025): 126 ▲
  - Density: 244.4/sq mi (94.38/km^{2})
- Time zone: UTC-6 (Central (CST))
  - Summer (DST): UTC-5 (CDT)
- ZIP Code: 72760
- FIPS code: 05-62060
- GNIS feature ID: 2407273

St. Paul is a town in Madison County, Arkansas, United States. The population was 111 at the 2020 census. It is on the edge of the Northwest Arkansas region.

St. Paul was platted in 1887 when the railroad was extended to that point.

== Geography ==
St. Paul is located in southern Madison County. Arkansas State Highways 16 and 23 run through the town together as 5th Street and Madison Avenue. Highway 23 leads north 22 miles (35 km) to Huntsville, the county seat, and south 30 miles (48 km) to Ozark, while Highway 16 leads northwest 32 miles (51 km) to Fayetteville and east along the spine of the Boston Mountains 131 miles (211 km) to Clinton.

According to the United States Census Bureau, the town has a total area of 0.45 square miles (1.2 km^{2}), of which 0.001 square miles (0.0026 km^{2}), or 0.22%, are water. The community is located along the upper reaches of the White River. The north boundary of the Ozark-St. Francis National Forest is adjacent to the south side of the community.

=== Ecoregion ===
St. Paul is located in the Upper Boston Mountains ecoregion. The ecoregion is generally higher and moister than the Lower Boston Mountains; elevations vary from 1,900 to 2,800 feet (580 to 850 m). Potential natural vegetation is oak–hickory forest. Characteristically, the forests of the Upper Boston Mountains are more closed and contain far less pine than those of the Lower Boston Mountains. North-facing slopes support mesic forests. The region is underlain by Pennsylvanian sandstone, shale and siltstone that contrasts with the limestone and dolomite that dominates the Ozark Highlands. Water quality in streams reflects geology, soils, and land use, and is typically exceptional; mineral, nutrient, and solid concentrations as well as turbidity all tend to be very low. During the summer, many streams do not flow. The timber industry was once a source of many jobs.

== Demographics ==
Historical population
Census	Pop.	Note	%±
1890	417		—
1900	345		−17.3%
1910	430		24.6%
1920	284		−34.0%
1930	198		−30.3%
1940	211		6.6%
1950	136		−35.5%
1960	118		−13.2%
1970	145		22.9%
1980	198		36.6%
1990	88		−55.6%
2000	163		85.2%
2010	113		−30.7%
2020	111		−1.8%
2025 (est.)	126	▲	13.5%
U.S. Decennial Census

As of the census of 2000, there were 163 people, 70 households, and 44 families residing in the town. The population density was 242.1/km^{2} (623.1/mi^{2}). There were 79 housing units at an average density of 117.3/km^{2} (302.0/mi^{2}). The racial makeup of the town was 100.00% White. 4.29% of the population were Hispanic or Latino of any race.

There were 70 households, out of which 25.7% had children under the age of 18 living with them, 50.0% were married couples living together, 10.0% had a female householder with no husband present, and 37.1% were non-families. 28.6% of all households were made up of individuals, and 18.6% had someone living alone who was 65 years of age or older. The average household size was 2.33 and the average family size was 2.95.

In the town, the population was spread out, with 22.1% under the age of 18, 7.4% from 18 to 24, 27.0% from 25 to 44, 26.4% from 45 to 64, and 17.2% who were 65 years of age or older. The median age was 40 years. For every 100 females, there were 94.0 males. For every 100 females age 18 and over, there were 104.8 males.

The median income for a household in the town was $25,625, and the median income for a family was $26,250. Males had a median income of $18,958 versus $15,500 for females. The per capita income for the town was $11,865. About 12.5% of families and 16.9% of the population were below the poverty line, including 32.4% of those under the age of eighteen and 12.5% of those 65 or over.

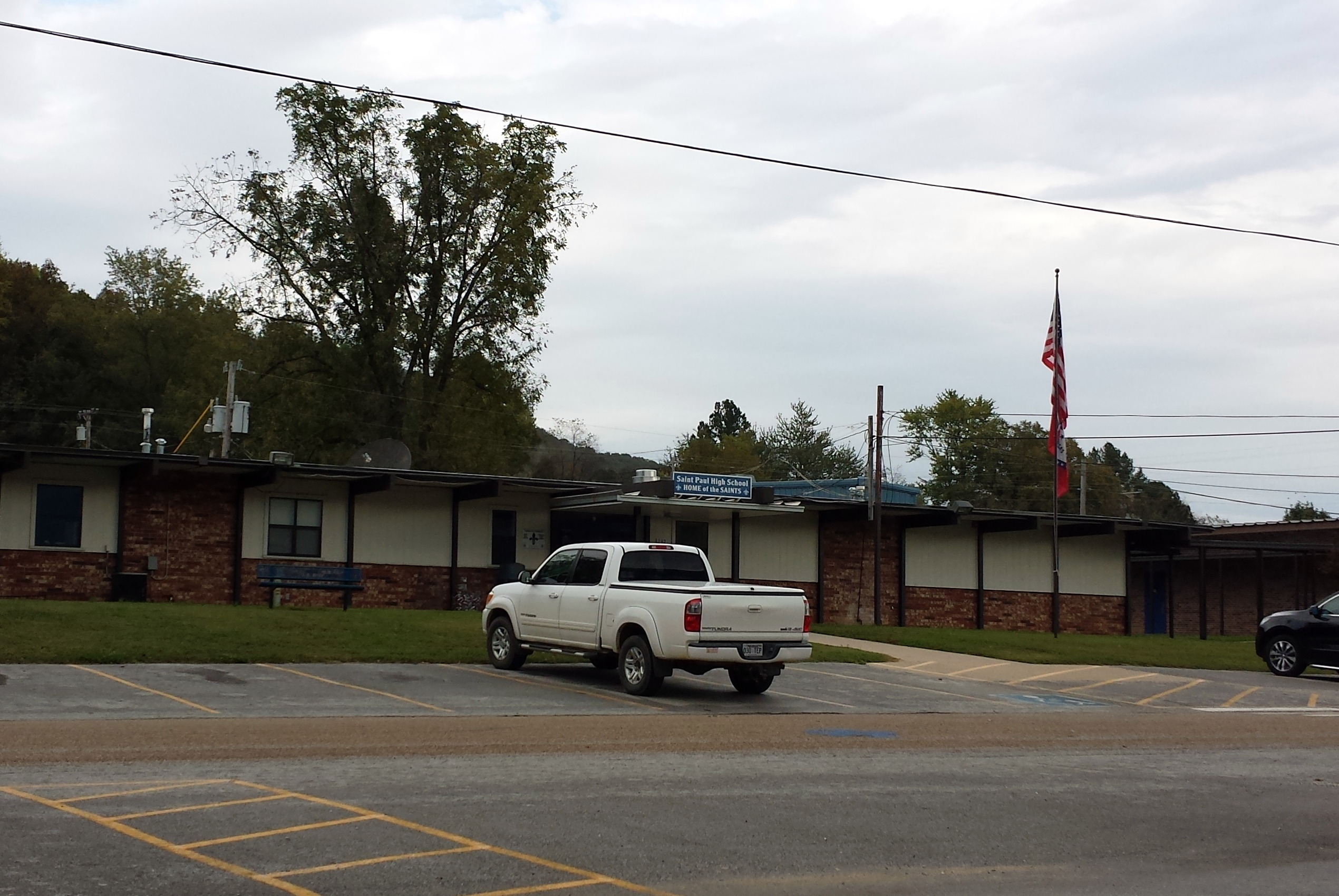
St. Paul High School

== Education ==
Public education for students in kindergarten through grade 12 is provided by the Huntsville School District, which leads to graduation at St. Paul High School.

On July 1, 2004, the St. Paul School District was merged into the Huntsville School District.
