= Razorback Regional Greenway =

Off-road shared-use trail in Northwest Arkansas

Coordinates: 36.33565°N 94.19035°W

NWA Razorback Regional Greenway
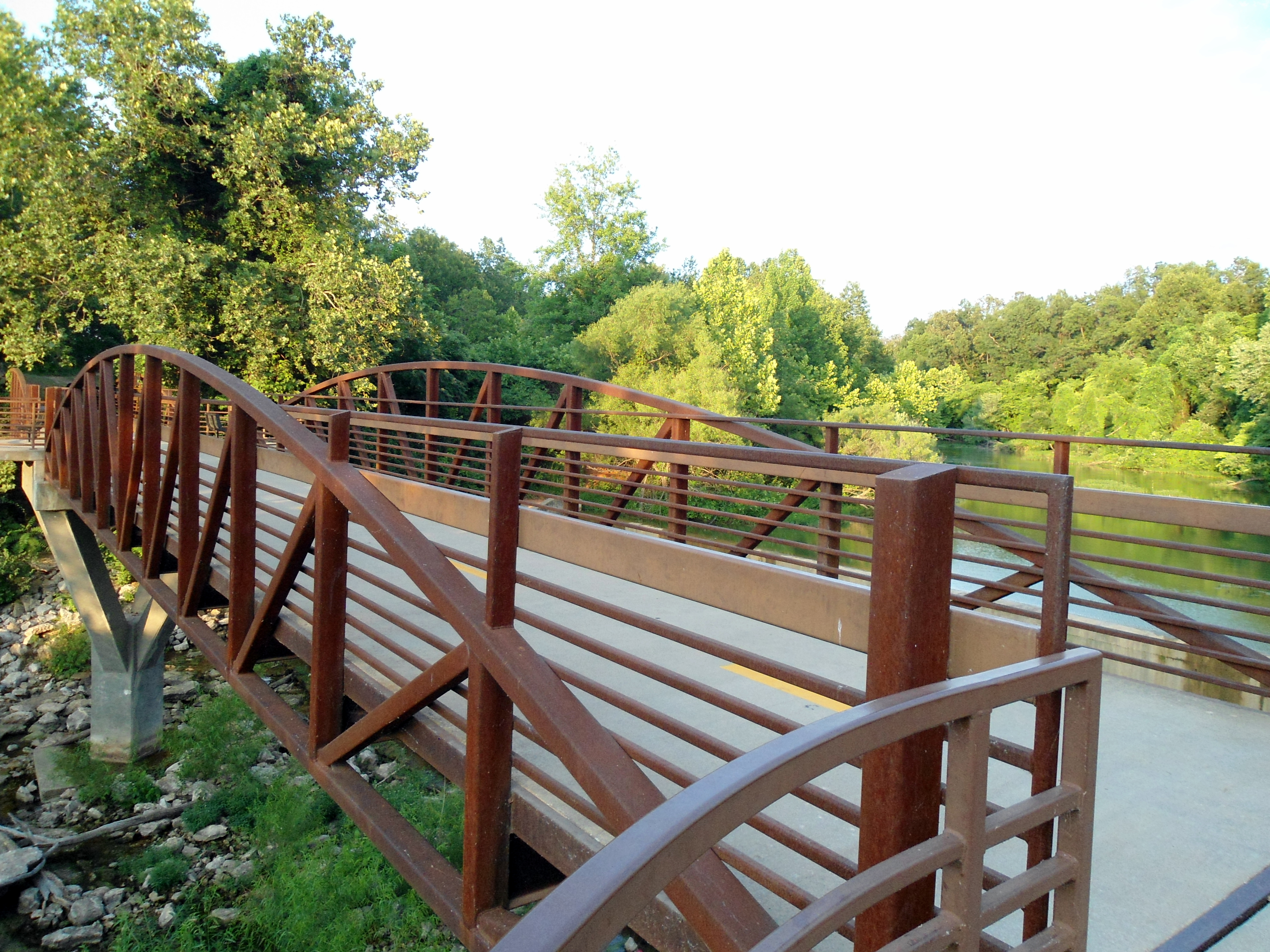
- Bridge over Lake Fayetteville near the trailhead
- Length: 40 mi (64 km)
- Location: Northwest Arkansas, United States
- Trailheads: Walker Park, Fayetteville; Lake Fayetteville, Fayetteville; Goad Springs Rd, Lowell; Lake Bella Vista, Bella Vista
- Use: Walkers, joggers and cyclists
- Difficulty: Easy
- Season: All
- Sights: Dickson Street; Lake Fayetteville; Emma Avenue; Spring Creek; Lake Springdale; Pinnacle Hills Promenade; Walmart AMP; Downtown Bentonville; Compton Gardens; Crystal Bridges Museum of American Art; Lake Bella Vista
- Website: https://razorbackgreenway.org/

The Northwest Arkansas Razorback Regional Greenway (usually shortened to Razorback Regional Greenway or just Greenway in Northwest Arkansas) is a 40 miles (64 km) primarily off-road shared-use trail in Northwest Arkansas. Dedicated on May 2, 2015, the Greenway connects Kessler Mountain Regional Park in Fayetteville, Arkansas to north of Lake Bella Vista in Bella Vista, Arkansas, while also serving schools, businesses and other cultural amenities along the route. In 2023 the Greenway was designated as a National Recreation Trail and was added to the National Trail System.

== History ==
First envisioned by the Northwest Arkansas Regional Planning Commission (NWARPC) during long-range planning that identified regional trails, the project came to fruition following the creation of a task force, public meetings, and coordination among NWA communities. Initially, the route was to follow three historically significant routes in NWA: the Butterfield Overland Mail route; Civil War routes; and the Trail of Tears in conjunction with the Arkansas Heritage Trails program.

=== Funding ===
A grant from the Walton Family Foundation in 2009 for up to $15 million ($22.5 million in current dollars) requiring 1-to-1 match from partner cities provided a revenue source for planning and design. The routing was also finalized during public meetings to serve many community attractions. A $15 million ($22.1 million in current dollars) Transportation Investment Generating Economic Recovery grant from the U.S. Department of Transportation, Federal Highway Administration in 2010 assisted in right-of-way acquisition and construction of the project. The Arkansas State Highway Commission also provided $855,000 ($1.2 million in current dollars) to the project.

== Usage ==
As of 2017, a report by the Walton Family Foundation, using data collected by San Diego State University, found that weekday bicycle volume (187 cyclists per day) and weekend volume (336 per day) had increased between 2015 and 2017 by 32% and 14% respectively.

Similarly, weekday pedestrian volume as of 2017 (166 pedestrians per day) and weekend volume (203 per day) had increased by about 5% and 19% respectively.

The report also found Northwest Arkansas's cyclists per capita to be 5.45 cyclists per 1,000 people, and pedestrians per capita to be 5.78 pedestrians per 1,000 people as of 2017.

== Community attractions ==
The Greenway serves the following community attractions:

- 6 downtowns
- 23 schools
- Campus of the University of Arkansas
- 3 hospitals
- Walmart, JB Hunt Transport Services and Tyson Foods corporate headquarters
- Arts and entertainment venues such as Crystal Bridges Museum of American Art and the Walmart AMP
- Historic sites
- Parks and Playgrounds
- Residential communities
- Shopping areas such as Northwest Arkansas Mall and Pinnacle Hills Promenade
