= Northwest Arkansas =

- Metropolitan Statistical Area
- Fayetteville–Springdale–Rogers, AR; Metropolitan Statistical Area
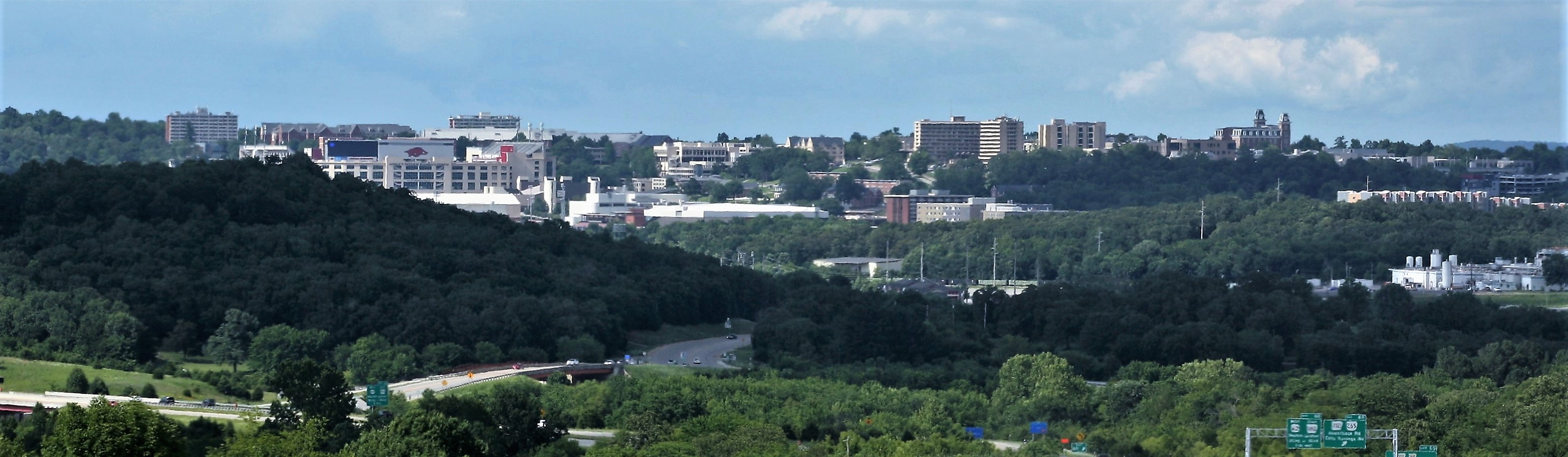
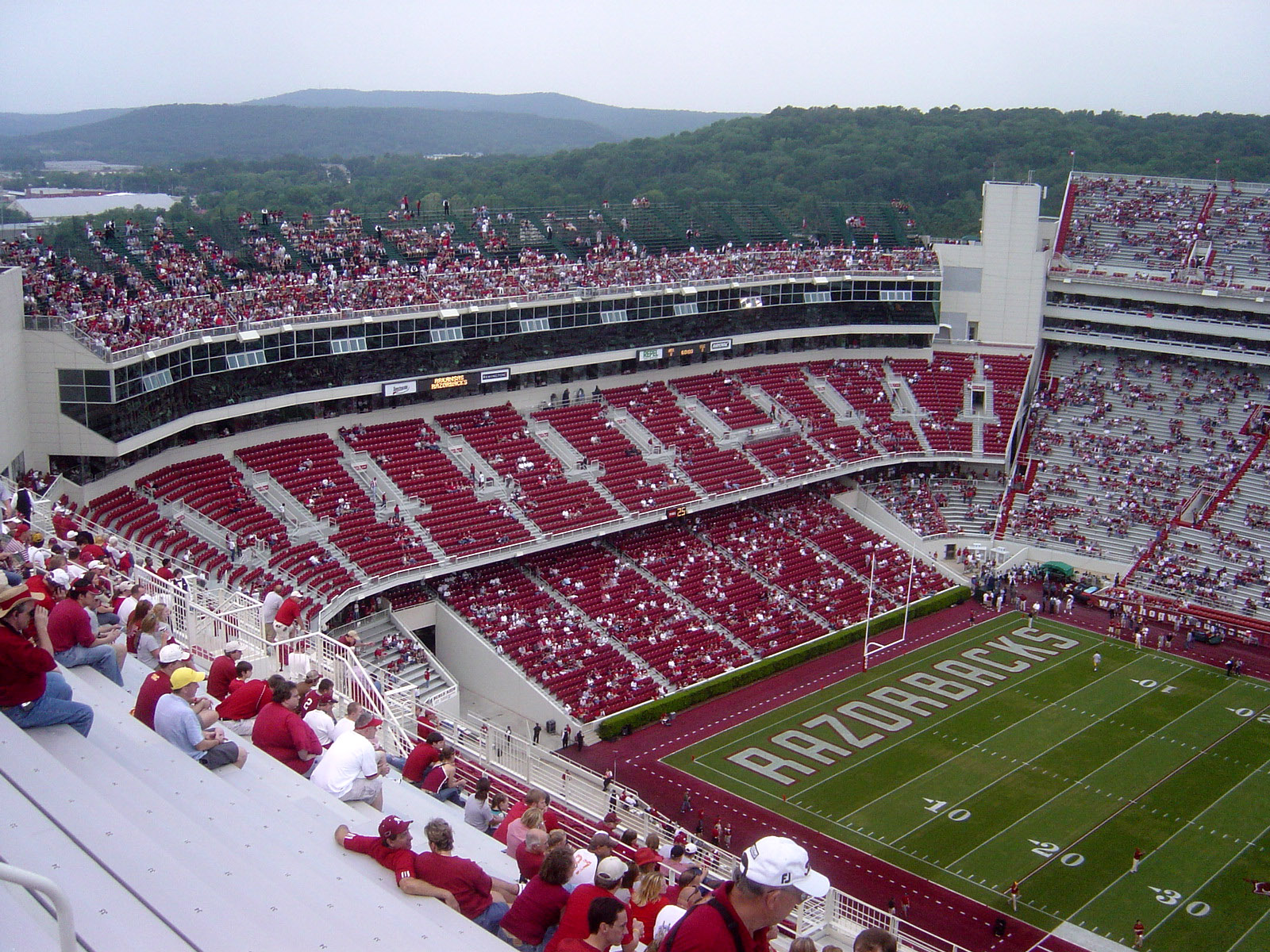
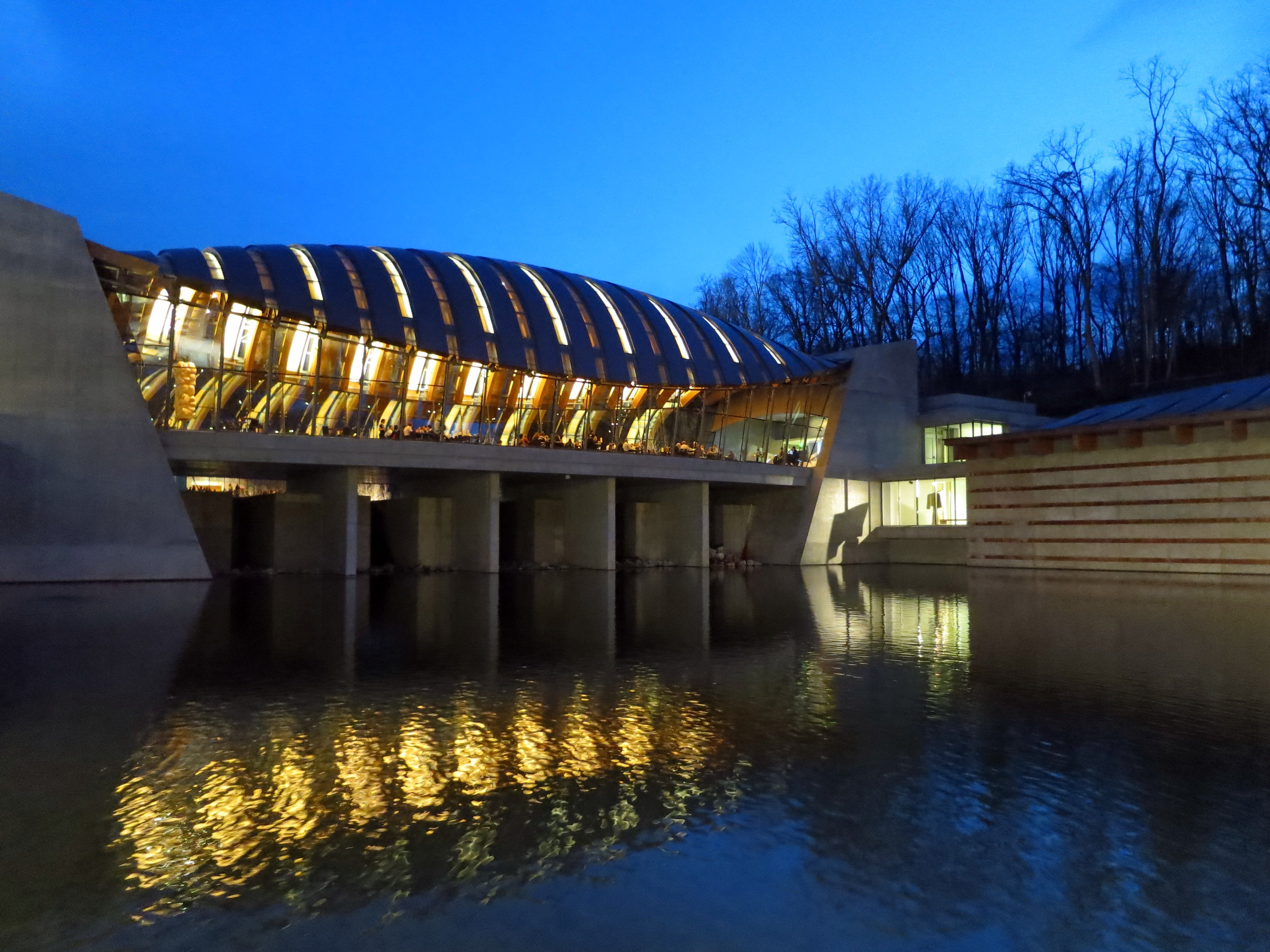
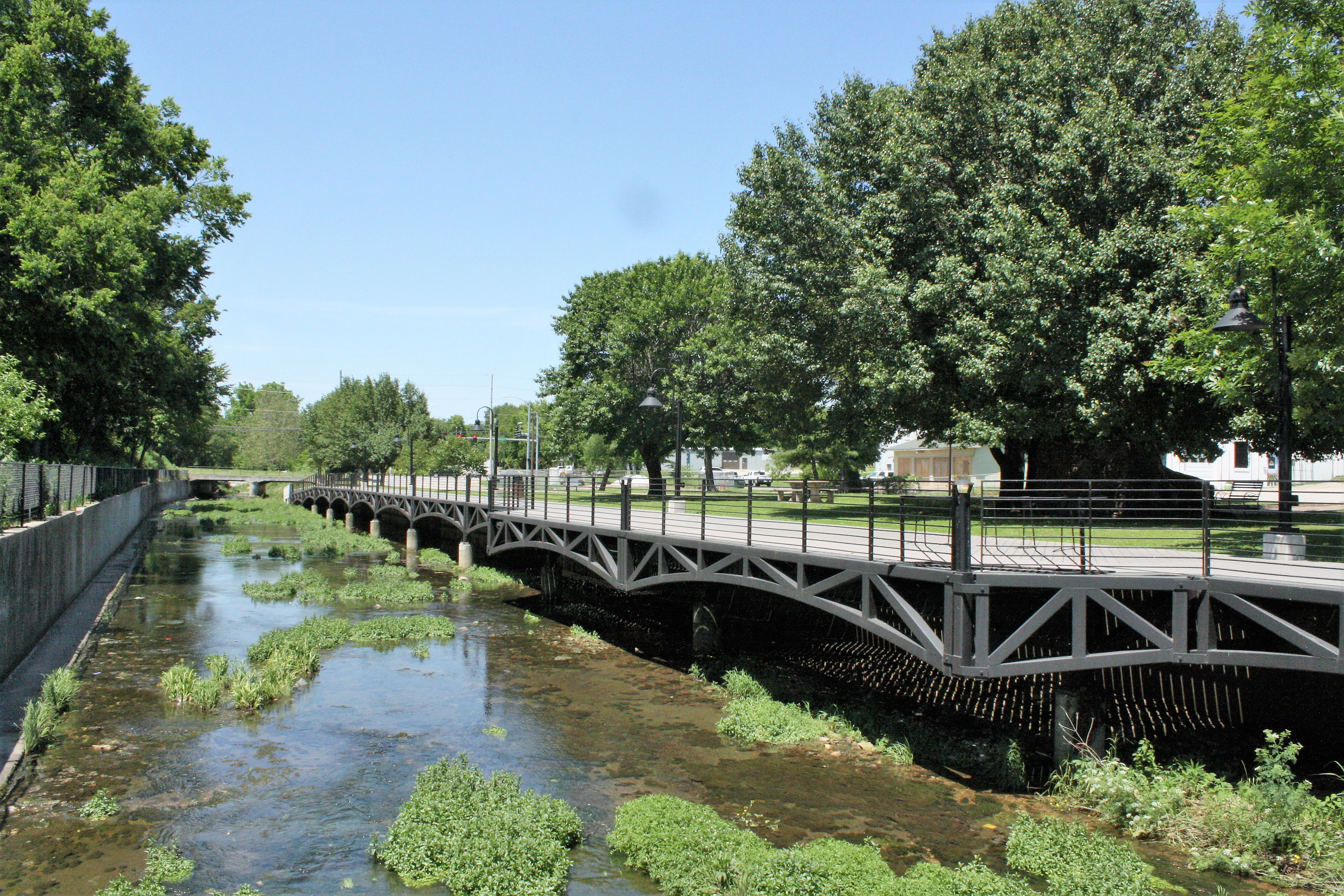
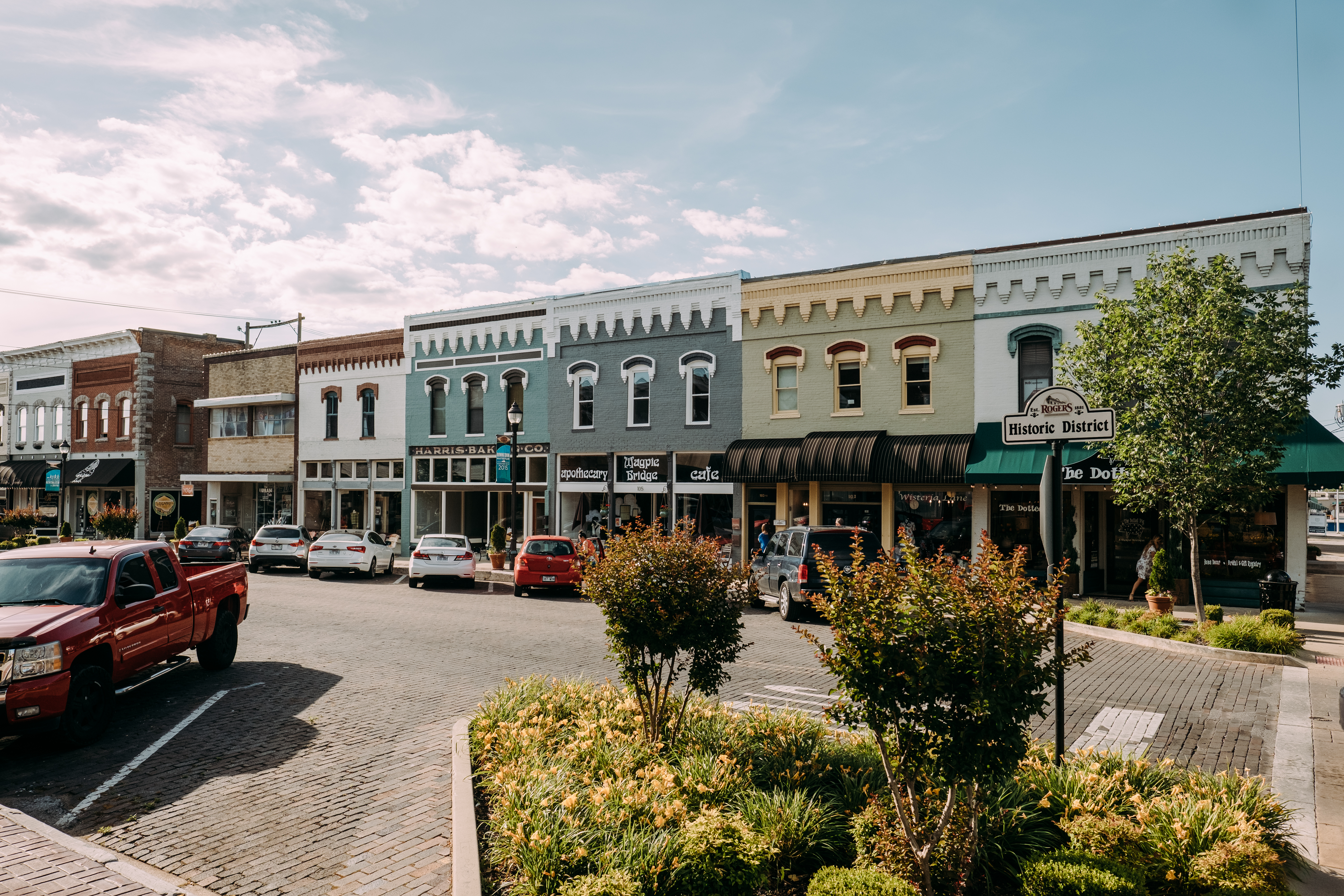
- Clockwise from top: The University of Arkansas within the Boston Mountains, Crystal Bridges Museum of American Art, downtown Rogers, downtown Springdale, Donald W. Reynolds Razorback Stadium
- Map highlighting the counties of Northwest Arkansas
- Coordinates: 36°4′35″N 94°9′39″W
- Country: United States
- State: Arkansas
- Largest City: Fayetteville
- Other Cities: Springdale; Rogers; Bentonville

Area
  - Total: 3,213.01 sq mi (8,321.7 km^{2})

Population (2025)
  - Total: 622,177 (94th)
  - Density: 174/sq mi (67/km^{2})

GDP
  - Total: $40.78 billion (2023)
- Time zone: UTC-6 (CST)
  - Summer (DST): UTC-5 (CDT)
- Area code: 479
- Website: www.northwestarkansas.org
- Highest elevation 2515 ft/767 m Lowest elevation 800 ft/244 m (sea level) at Beaver Lake.

Northwest Arkansas (NWA) is a metropolitan area and region in Arkansas within the Ozarks. It includes four of the ten largest cities in the state: Fayetteville, Springdale, Rogers, and Bentonville, the surrounding towns of Benton and Washington counties, and adjacent rural Madison County, Arkansas. The United States Census Bureau-defined Fayetteville–Springdale–Rogers Metropolitan Statistical Area includes 3,213.01 square miles (8,321.7 km^{2}) and 622,177 residents (as of 2025), ranking NWA as the 98th most-populous metropolitan statistical area in the U.S. and the 13th fastest growing in the United States.

Northwest Arkansas doubled in population between 1990 and 2010. Growth has been driven by the three Fortune 500 companies based in NWA: Walmart, Tyson Foods, and J.B. Hunt Transport Services, Inc. The University of Arkansas is also located in this region, as well as nearly 1,300 suppliers and vendors drawn to the region by the large businesses. There are also several large private employers like Simmons Foods in Siloam Springs. The region has also seen significant investment in amenities, including the Crystal Bridges Museum of American Art, the Walton Arts Center, the Walmart AMP, TheatreSquared, and the NWA Razorback Regional Greenway.

== Etymology ==
"We’re like five siblings, if you will, fighting for crumbs that fall off the table instead of joining together with a common voice and say the same thing that this is the No. 1 highway project in Northwest Arkansas."

— Uvalde Lindsey

The region is also sometimes known as "the 479" after the telephone area code that serves the region, though the Fort Smith metro also uses the 479 area code. Occasionally, the Fort Smith metro is included in "Northwest Arkansas", though it is within the geographically distinct Arkansas River Valley region and separated from the subject region by the sparsely populated Boston Mountains.

== Geography ==
Northwest Arkansas is located in the Southern United States. It is within the Upper South, characterized by the Ozarks. The southern part of NWA is a high and deeply dissected plateau, full of sparsely populated oak-hickory forest, separating the region from the Arkansas River Valley to the south.

=== Political geography ===
Settlements were initially founded in the 19th century and early 20th century as individual communities, with Fayetteville, Springdale, Rogers, and Bentonville serving as historic population centers in the area. Growth began during the mid-20th century, a period of suburbanization largely rooted in automobile dependency. Thus the Northwest Arkansas cities expanded toward one another along major transportation corridors, in some cases becoming seamlessly connected urban areas such as Prairie Grove and Farmington along US 62 now connected to Fayetteville's southwest side. The transition from individual communities separated by rural or agricultural lands accelerated rapidly in the 1990s and early 2000s, as the population of the region doubled. Cities began rapidly annexing unincorporated lands, especially near the four-largest focal cities, adding an additional 45.5 square miles (118 km^{2}) or 16% of incorporated size between 2000 and 2004. The Northwest Arkansas Regional Planning Commission (NWARPC, the region's metropolitan planning organization) expanded its planning area to include all of Benton and Washington counties in 2003. Annexations along transportation corridors spurred the need for expanding roadways, including along US 62 southwest of Fayetteville and northeast of Rogers, and Highway 59 north from Siloam Springs.

The United States Census Bureau definition includes Benton, Washington, and Madison counties in Arkansas. Until 2018, the Census Bureau also included McDonald County, Missouri.

=== Cities ===
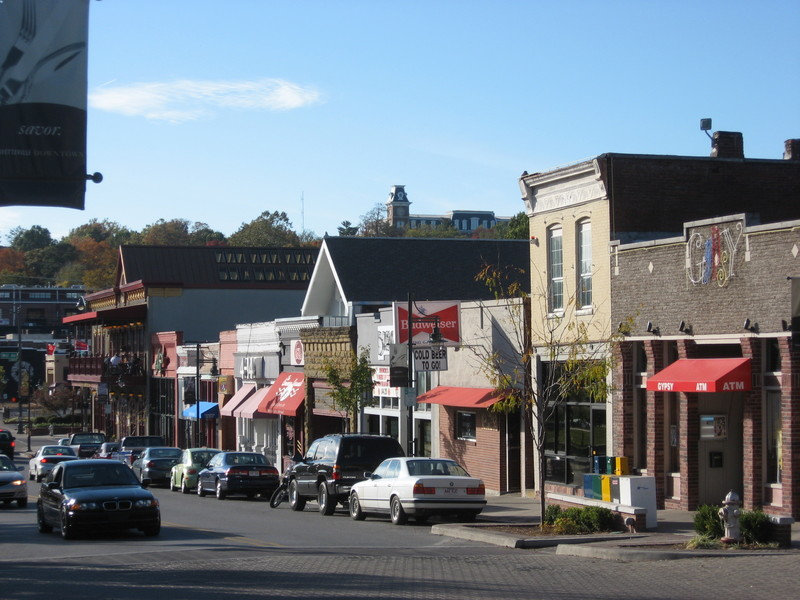
Partial view of Fayetteville's locally famous Dickson Street.

==== Fayetteville ====
Fayetteville is the principal city of Northwest Arkansas, home to the University of Arkansas, and the county seat of Washington County. As of the 2020 census, the city had a total population of 93,949. The city is the second most populous in Arkansas and serves as the county seat of Washington County. It's also known for Dickson Street, perhaps the most prominent entertainment district in the state of Arkansas, which itself contains the Walton Arts Center. Blocks from Dickson Street is the Fayetteville Historic Square, which hosts the nation's number one ranked Fayetteville's Farmer's Market. Fayetteville was also ranked 8th on Forbes Magazine's Top 10 Best Places in America for Business and Careers in 2007. Business Insider named Fayetteville the 2nd best place to live in the South in 2016.

==== Springdale ====
Springdale is a city in Washington and Benton Counties. According to the 2020 census, the population of the city is 87,315. Springdale is currently Arkansas's fourth-largest city, behind Little Rock, Fort Smith, and Fayetteville. Springdale is the location of the headquarters of Tyson Foods Inc., the largest meat producing company in the world, and has been dubbed the "Chicken Capital of the World" by several publications. In 2008, the Wichita Wranglers of AA minor league baseball's Texas League moved to Springdale and play in Arvest Ballpark as the Northwest Arkansas Naturals.

==== Rogers ====
Rogers is a city in Benton County. As of the 2020 census, the city is the sixth most populous in the state, with a total population of 69,913. In June 2007, BusinessWeek magazine ranked Rogers 18th in the 25 best affordable suburbs in the South. In 2010, CNN Money magazine ranked Rogers as the 10th Best Place to Live in the United States. Two of the city's biggest attractions are the outdoor concert venue the Walmart AMP and the open air shopping mall the Pinnacle Hills Promenade. The city is the home town of American country music singer-songwriter Joe Nichols, and Marty Perry, as well as David Noland. It is also where comedian Will Rogers married Betty Blake, and also where Sam Walton opened the first store under the Walmart name in 1962.

==== Bentonville ====
Bentonville is the county seat of Benton County. At the 2020 census, the population was 54,210, up from 38,284 in 2010 ranking it as the state's 9th largest city. It is home to the headquarters of Walmart, which is the largest retailer in the world, and Crystal Bridges Museum of American Art. Crystal Bridges, founded by Sam Walton's daughter Alice Walton and designed by world-renowned architect Moshe Safdie, is home to some of America's finest works of art as well as Frank Lloyd Wright's Bachman-Wilson House. In 2018, Southern Living magazine cited Bentonville as "the South's next cultural mecca."

=== Cityscapes ===
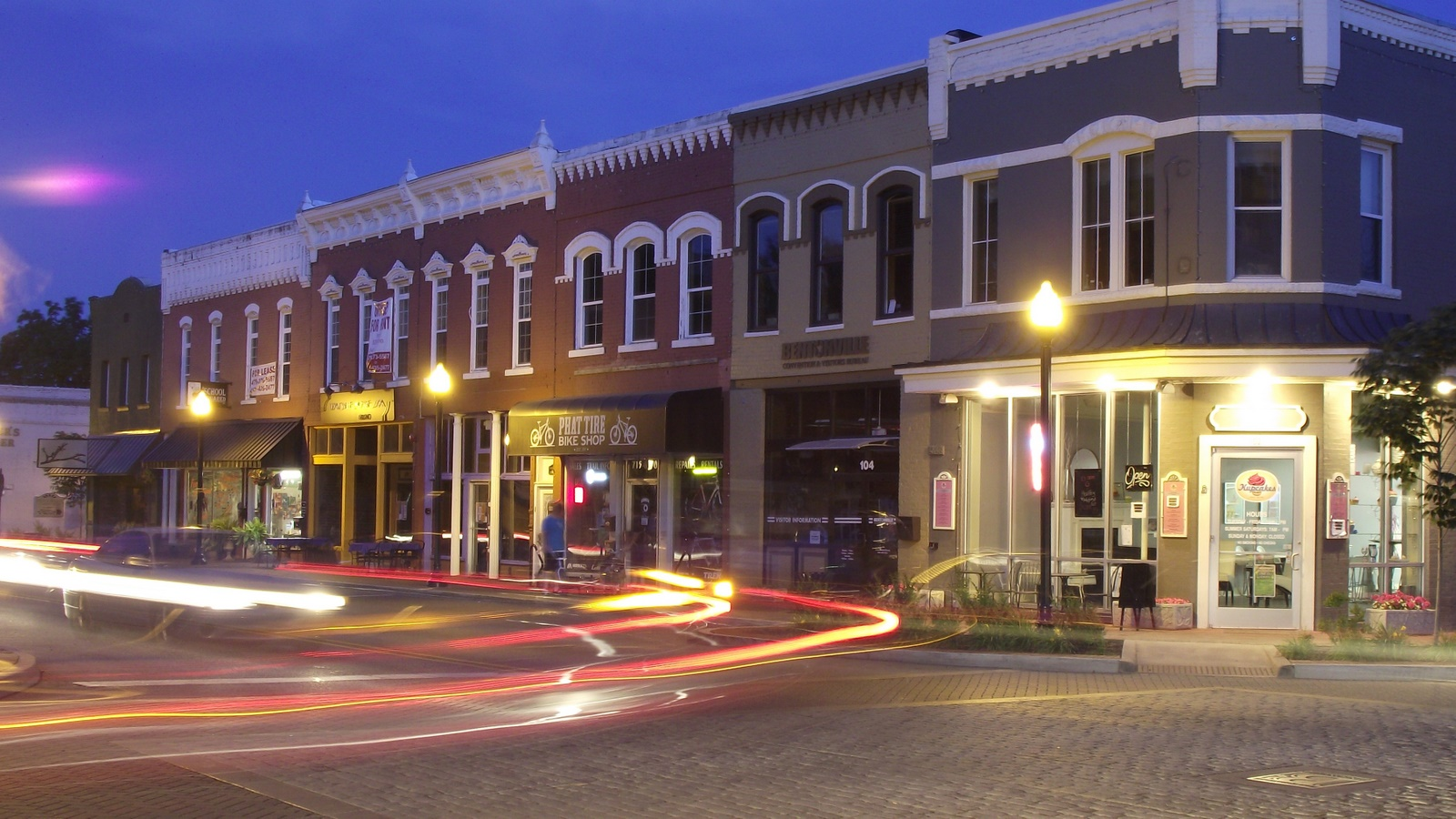
Bentonville

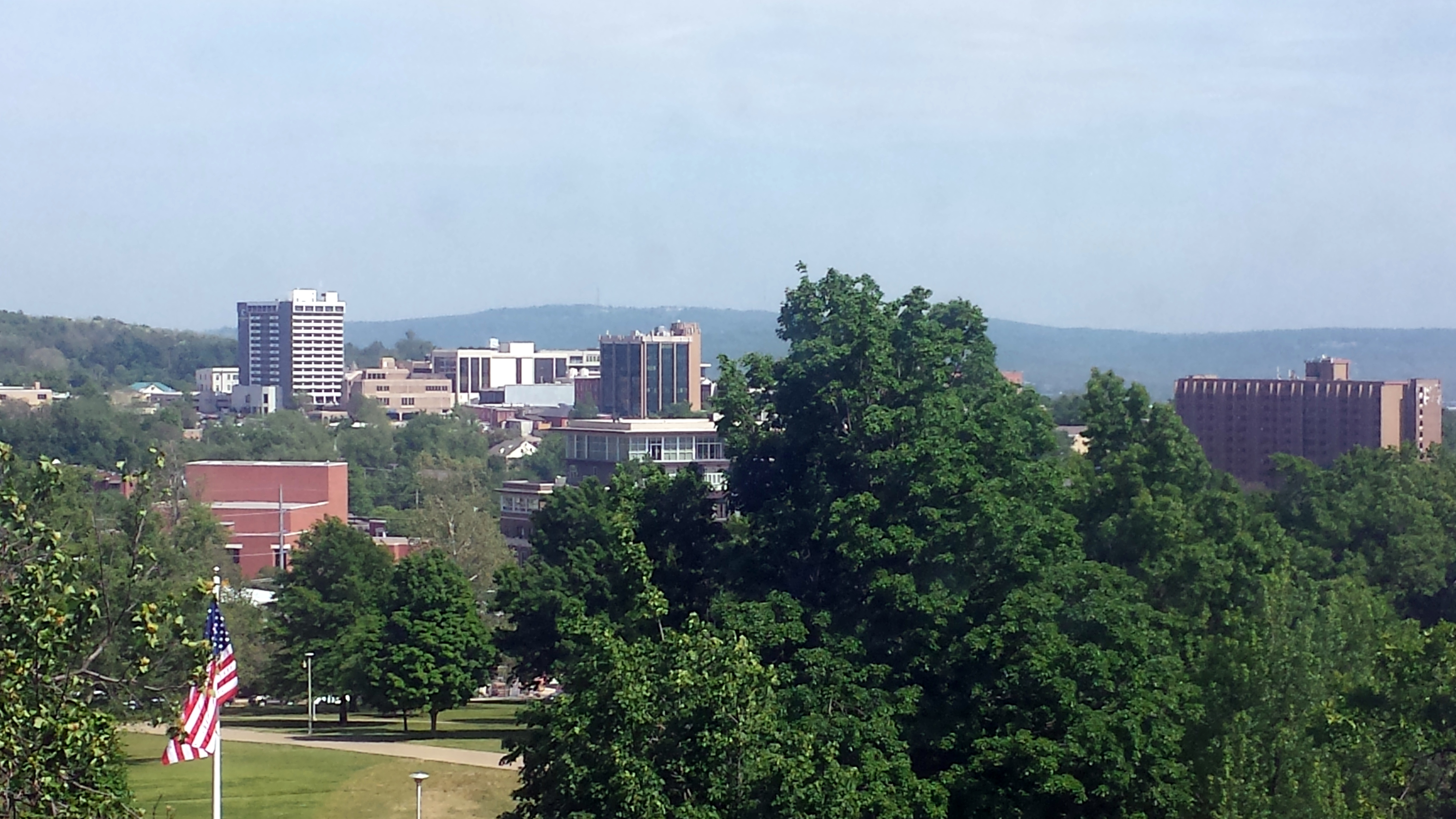
Downtown Fayetteville

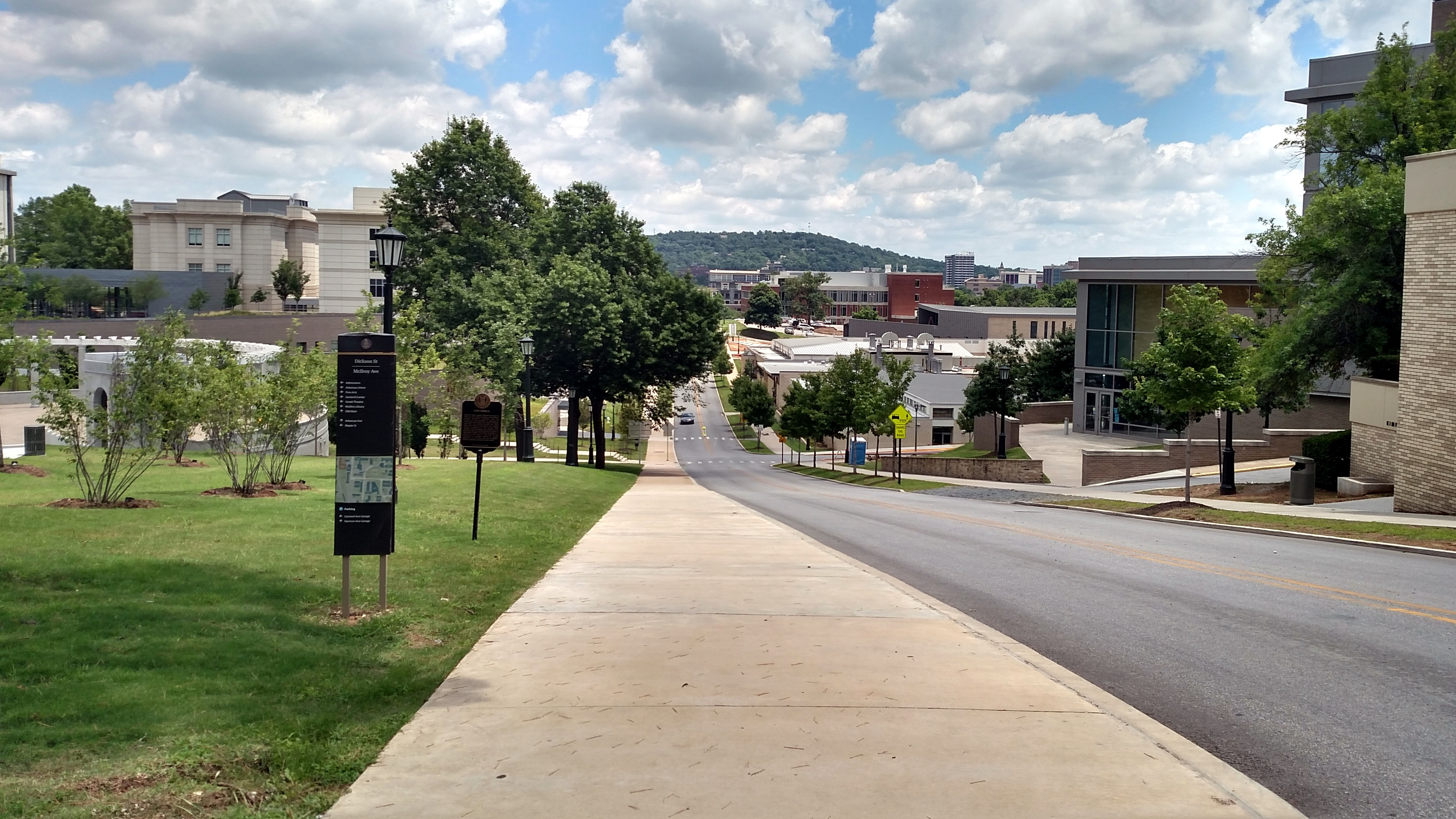
University of Arkansas Campus, Fayetteville

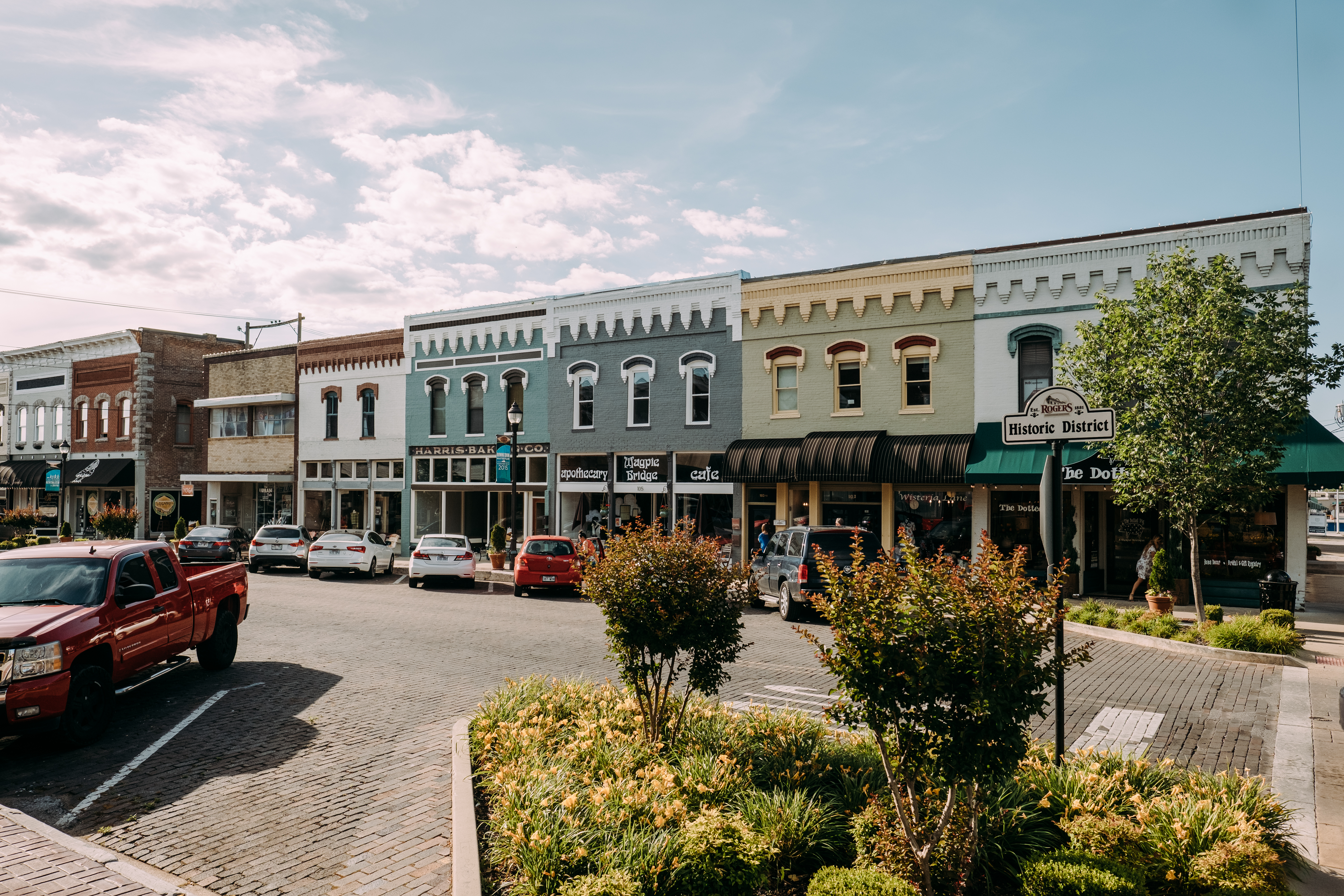
Rogers

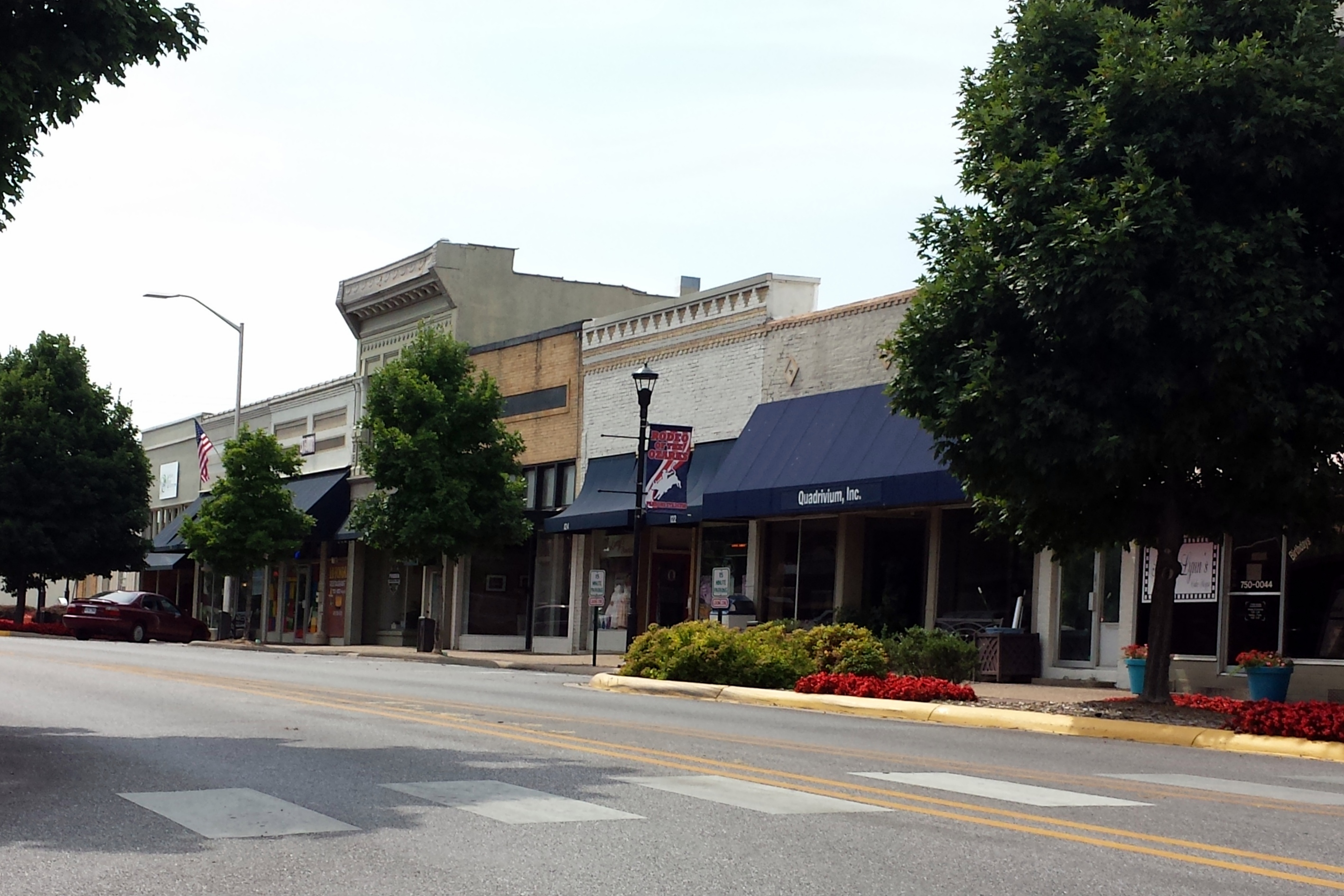
Emma Avenue, Springdale

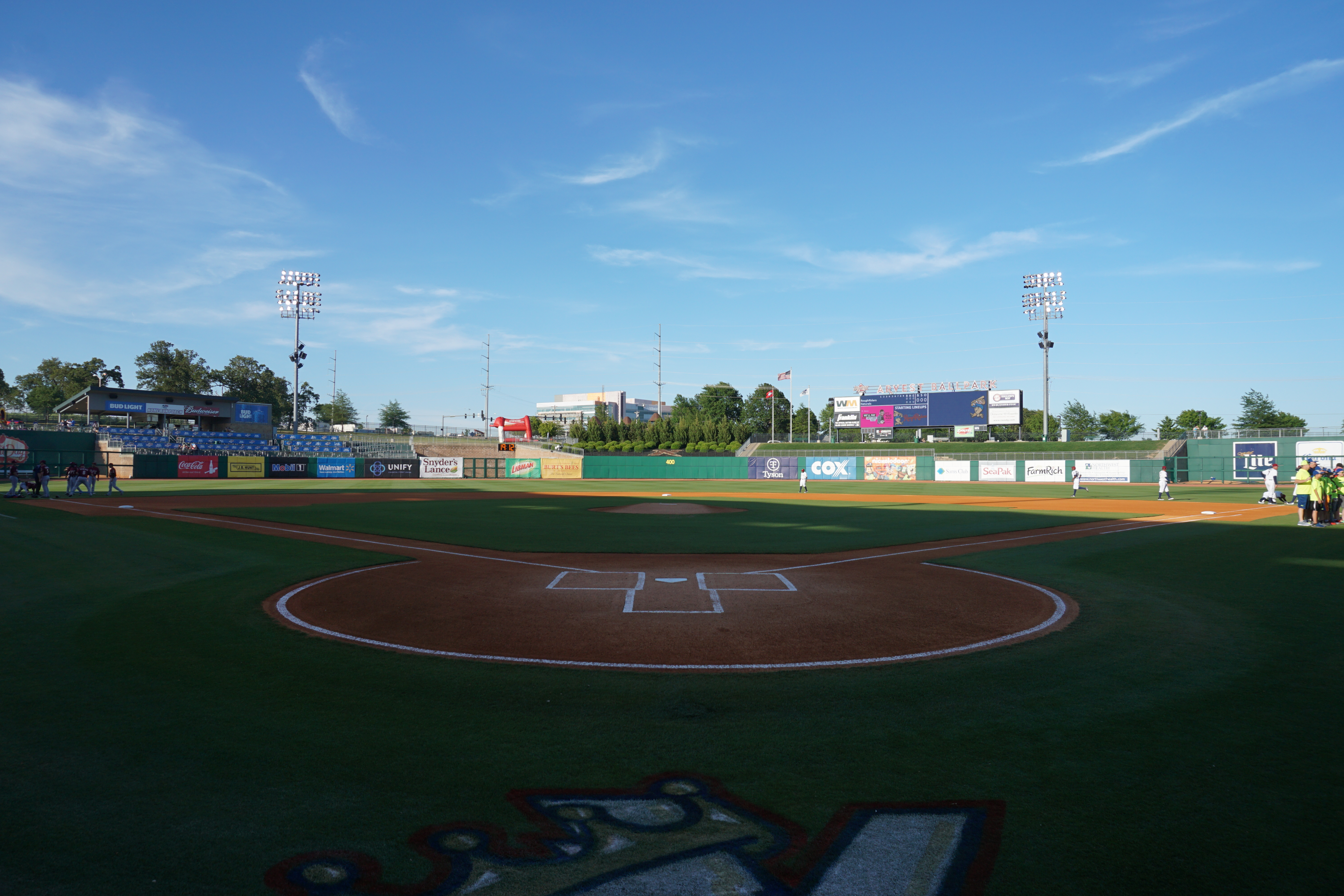
Arvest Ballpark, Springdale

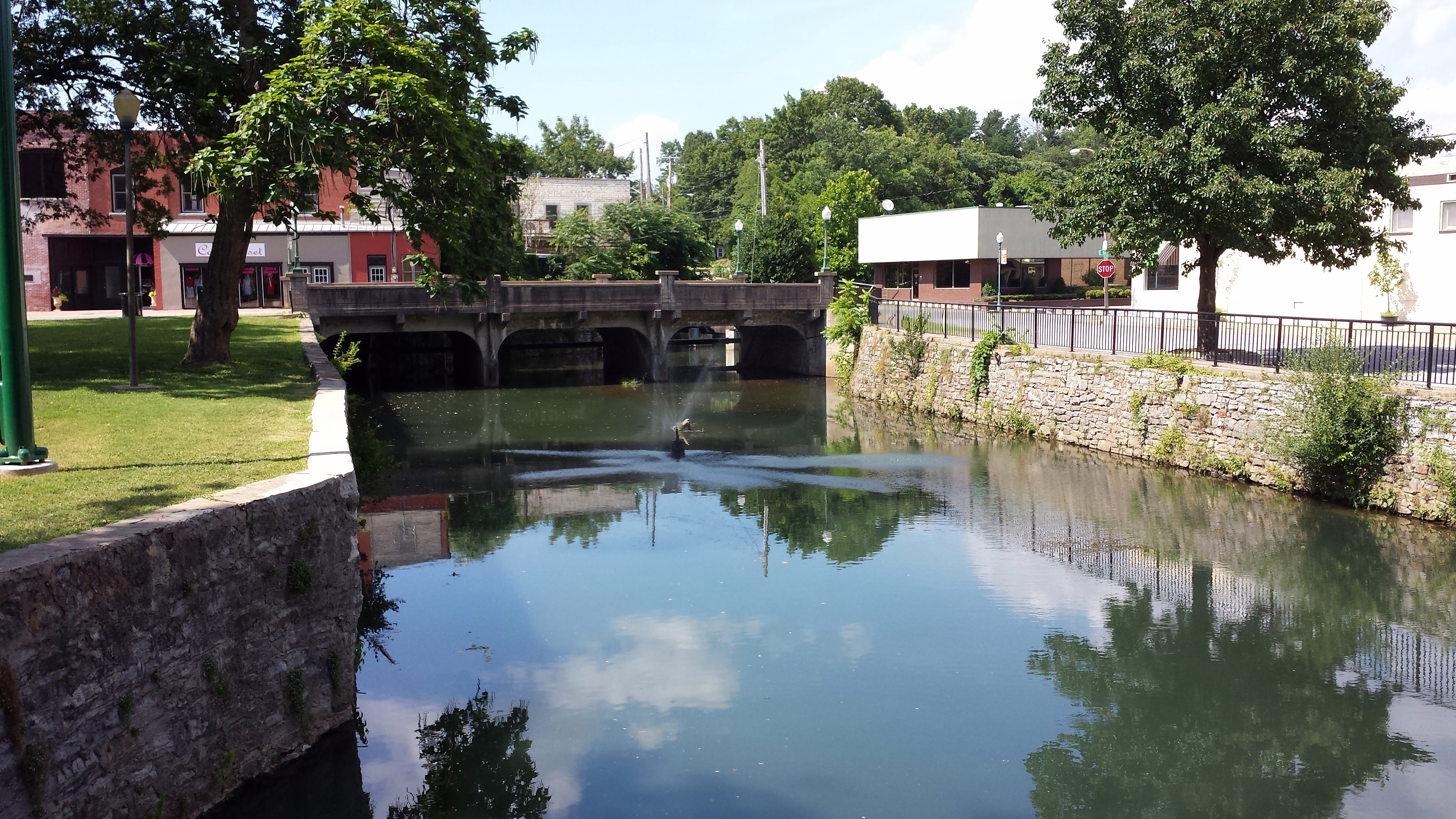
Sager Creek, Siloam Springs

=== Geology ===
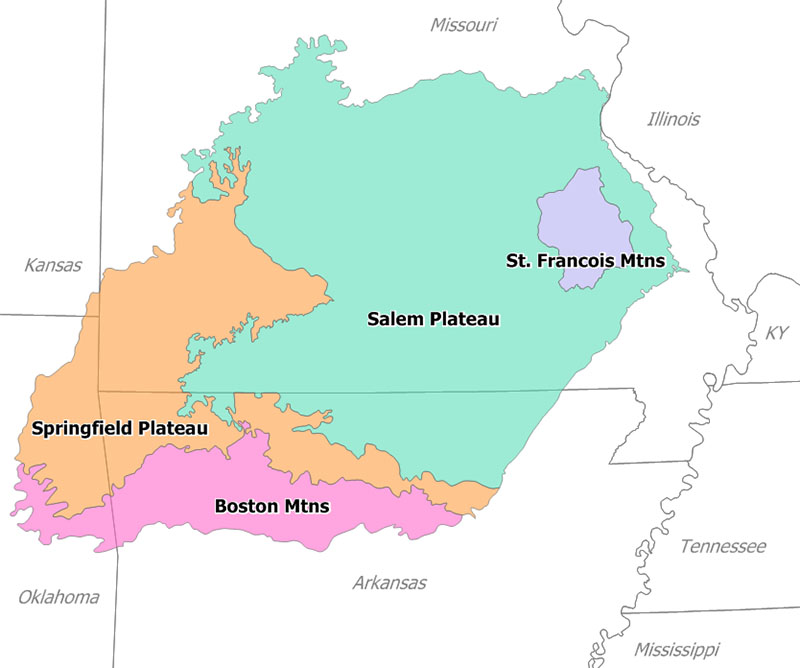
The split between the Springfield Plateau and the Boston Mountains occurs in the center of Washington County very near Fayetteville. The rough, mountainous terrain south of Fayetteville is the Boston Mountains while the more-habitable Springfield Plateau contains the cities of Springdale, Bentonville and Rogers to the north.

NWA is located within the Ozark Mountains, a deeply dissected plateau within the U.S. Interior Highlands, the largest mountainous region between the Appalachians and the Rocky Mountains. Although the topography varies widely within the region, the Ozark geology is present throughout. Roughly at Fayetteville, the geology splits between the Boston Mountains to the south and the Springfield Plateau to the north. The Ouachita orogeny exposed the older limestones of the Springfield Plateau, resulting in a softer terrain, while the Boston Mountains retained steep, sharp grade changes. The Ozarks are covered by an oak-hickory-pine forest, with large portions of protected forestland remaining NWA. Approximately 25% of this forest has been cleared for development and agricultural uses.

=== Hydrology ===
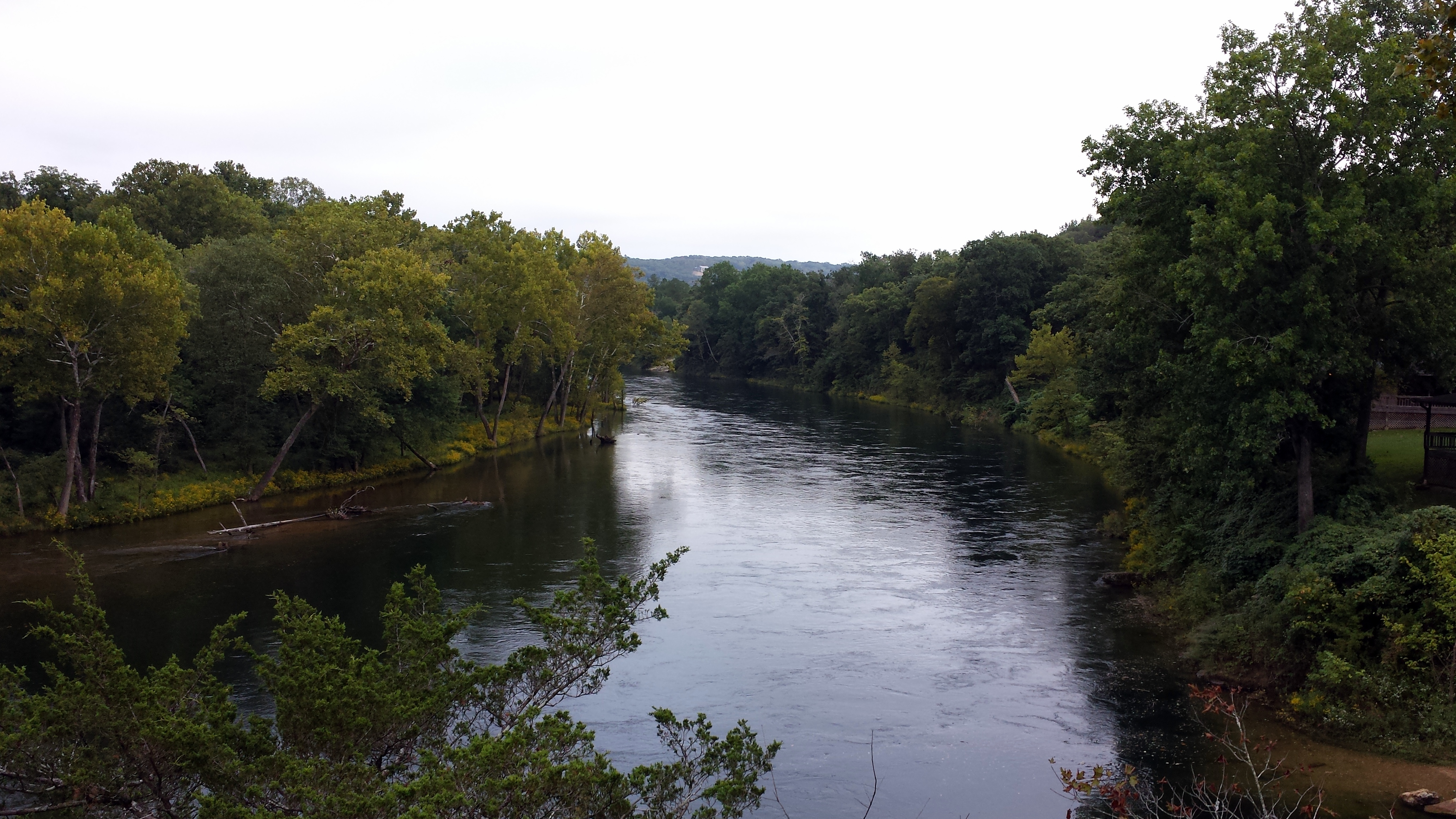
White River at Spider Creek

Most of NWA is within the White River watershed, with the western portions being contained within the Illinois River watershed.

Within NWA, the White River is impounded at several locations, the most important of which is at Beaver Dam, forming the 13,700 acres (5,500 ha) Beaver Lake. This reservoir was created in the 1960s for flood control, recreational, and energy production uses. It also serves as the water supply for most of NWA, with Beaver Water District treating potable water and selling it directly to the four largest NWA municipalities.

The Illinois River watershed is a sensitive watershed that has been the subject of controversy within the area for many years. The phosphorus load of the Illinois has been subject of controversy, eventually resulting in litigation between Oklahoma and Arkansas reaching the United States Supreme Court in 1992. The Environmental Protection Agency (EPA) has classified the Illinois as Section 303(d) of the Clean Water Act, listing it as an "impaired and threatened water" due to the high phosphorus loads.

=== Parks ===
The Northwest Arkansas region is known for its natural environment, and outdoor recreation. When selecting a name for the new minor league baseball team in the early 2000s, Northwest Arkansas Naturals was selected in honor of the region's natural resources, including a waterfall in the initial logo to symbolize the region's over 130 naturally occurring waterfalls. The region offers thousands of acres of public land under various agencies, ecoregion type, and function. Despite rapid suburbanization, over half of Washington and 40% of Benton county remained forested in 2015. The region has maintained an open space plan since 2015, and has considered a sales tax to fund purchases of open lands by the Northwest Arkansas Land Trust.

An expansive trail network has been built across Northwest Arkansas, centered on the Northwest Arkansas Razorback Regional Greenway, a 38-mile (61 km) primarily off-road shared-use paved trail connecting the region's major cities, employer headquarters, schools, parks and cultural amenities. Upon completion in 2015, the Greenway connected to 68 miles (109 km) of other hard-surfaced trails and over 100 miles (160 km) of soft-surface nature trails throughout the region. Northwest Arkansas has drawn endorsement from the mountain biking community, earning a 'Regional Ride Center' designation from the International Mountain Bicycling Association in 2015, the first granted to a region rather than a city. Mountain biking trail development has continued, adding mileage in the state parks along natural features.

The most popular water destination is Beaver Lake. Beaver Lake has approximately 449 miles (723 km) of natural shoreline, with limestone bluffs, natural caves, and a variety of trees and flowering shrubs. Paved access roads wind through twelve developed parks, all of which have campsites offering electricity, fire rings, drinking water, showers, and restrooms. Other facilities, such as picnic sites, swimming beaches, hiking trails, boat launch ramps, and sanitary dump stations are also available. Nine rivers can be canoed, paddled, or floated seasonally when stream flows permit, including the nearby Buffalo National River and nearby Illinois River, King's River, and Elk River.

The University of Arkansas offers equipment rental and outdoor excursions into the Ozarks for students.

The Botanical Garden of the Ozarks opened in 2007, and includes seasonal plantings in a small area, a wildflower meadow, a lakeside hiking trail, and a self-guided tree identification tour.

==== State parks and areas ====
The region contains three state parks. Hobbs State Park - Conservation Area, the largest state park in Arkansas, is jointly managed by the Arkansas Department of Parks and Tourism, Arkansas Natural Heritage Commission, and the Arkansas Game and Fish Commission. Devil's Den State Park is a popular hiking and camping destination near Winslow. Prairie Grove Battlefield State Park preserves the history of the Civil War Battle of Prairie Grove.

The three-county region also contains two natural areas, Garrett Hollow Natural Area, Sweden Creek Natural Area, and four wildlife management areas (Beaver Lake WMA, McIlroy Madison County WMA, Wedington WMA, White Rock WMA).

== Culture and contemporary life ==
=== Art and entertainment ===
Partial view of Fayetteville's Dickson Street.

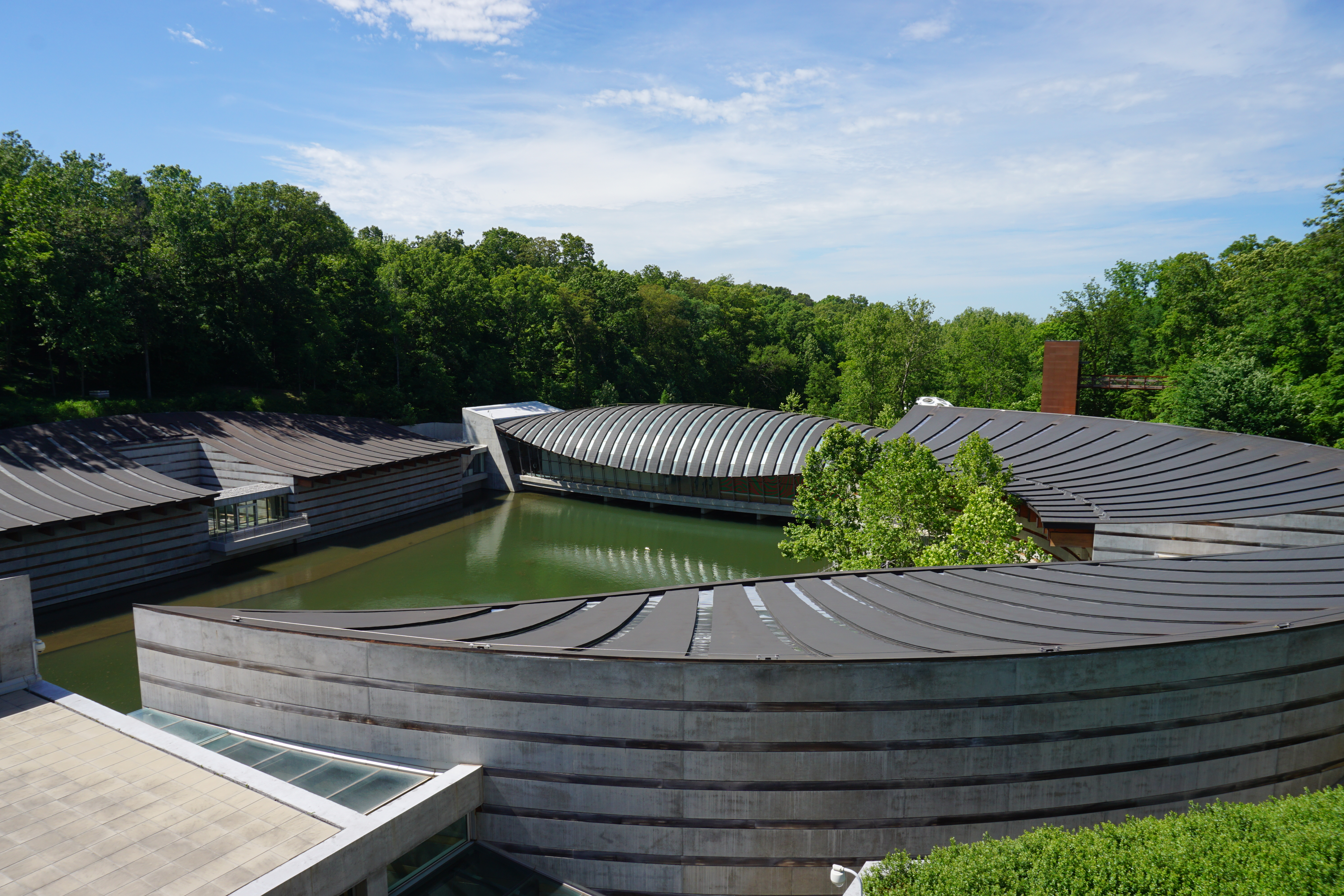
The Crystal Bridges Museum of American Art looking northwest.

The Crystal Bridges Museum of American Art in Bentonville opened in 2011. The museum, funded by Sam Walton's daughter, Alice Walton, and designed by world-renowned architect Moshe Safdie, is home to a permanent collection of works, as well as rotating exhibits throughout the year. The Walton Arts Center is Arkansas' largest performing arts center. It is located in Fayetteville near the campus of the University of Arkansas and serves as a cultural center for the Northwest Arkansas area. The theater was opened in 1992 and was funded largely by the Walton family (of Wal-Mart). The center is host to many musicals, plays, and other artistic and educational events throughout the year. The Walton Arts Center is also home to the Symphony of Northwest Arkansas, currently under the direction of Paul Haas.

TheatreSquared is Northwest Arkansas's regional professional theatre. Its four-play season and annual Arkansas New Play Fest are attended by an audience of 22,000, including educational outreach program to approximately 10,000 students and their teachers. The company was recognized by the American Theatre Wing in 2011 as one of the nation's ten most promising emerging theatres.

The Arts Center of the Ozarks is the region's oldest community theatre. Since its inception in 1967, the ACO has grown from a small arts organization into a cultural center of regional significance. Located in downtown Springdale, the ACO offers a full season of mainstage plays and musicals, children's programs, visual arts exhibits, and classes in a variety of creative outlets.

The Bentonville square features the Wal-Mart Visitors Center. Located in Sam Walton's original Bentonville variety store, the Wal-Mart Visitors Center traces the origin and growth of Wal-Mart. The center was created as an educational and informative facility as well as a museum.

Dickson Street and the surrounding area in downtown Fayetteville is the main entertainment district of the region, located just off the University of Arkansas campus. The area is dense with restaurants, bars, and shops. Dickson Street is home to the Walton Arts Center and many parades.

=== Festivals ===
- Bikes, Blues, & BBQ motorcycle rally formerly on Dickson Street in Fayetteville but now in Rogers with over 400,000 people attending over four days.
- Since 2015, the Bentonville Film Festival has taken place in the first week of May. Over 85,000 attendees take part in this week-long event.
- Since 1974, the Dogwood Festival has brought around 30,000 people to Siloam Springs and its parks for a 3-day event. Food, crafts, entertainment, flea market items, and KidZone activities make for a fun day for all ages. Held the weekend of the last Sunday in April each year.
- In 2009, the City of Fayetteville began assisting in the sponsorship of All Out June, Northwest Arkansas' pride festival for the LGBT community. The event is considered Arkansas' largest, and is organized by the NWA Center for Equality and the NWA Pride Parade Organization.
- Walmart Shareholder's Meeting at Bud Walton Arena brings over 5,000 employees to Fayetteville from around the world.
- Since 2011, the World Championship Squirrel Cook Off in Bentonville.
- Battle of Prairie Grove Reenactment, hundreds of Civil War reenactors camp and fight at Prairie Grove Battlefield State Park in December of even-numbered years.
- Format Festival, a festival combining music, art, and technology, was started in 2022 and runs for a weekend in September in Bentonville. Format is produced by C3 Presents, who also started well-known festivals like Austin City Limits Music Festival and Lollapalooza.

=== Sports ===
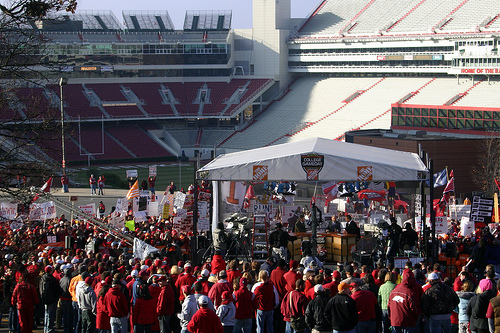
View of Razorback Stadium during a visit from ESPN's College Gameday

The sporting scene is large in Northwest Arkansas, primarily due to the presence of the University of Arkansas Razorbacks, Arkansas’ most successful, followed, and loved sports teams. The Razorbacks have a huge economic impact on the area, drawing fans from every corner of the state during football, basketball, and baseball seasons.

The Razorbacks currently field 19 total men's and women's varsity teams (8 men's and 11 women's) in 13 sports. The men's varsity teams are baseball, basketball, cross country, football, golf, tennis, and indoor and outdoor track and field; the 11 women's varsity teams are basketball, cross country, golf, gymnastics, soccer, swimming and diving, indoor and outdoor track, tennis, softball and volleyball. The Razorbacks compete in NCAA Division I (Division I FBS in football) and are currently members of the Southeastern Conference (Western Division).

Facilities include: Reynolds Razorback Stadium, Bud Walton Arena, Baum Stadium, Randal Tyson Indoor Track Center, and the John McDonnell Field.

Other collegiate athletics programs include the John Brown University Golden Eagles (NAIA), the Northwest Arkansas Community College Eagles (NJCAA), and the Ecclesia College Royals (NCCAA).

In early 2008, Northwest Arkansas welcomed a Double-A minor league baseball team, formerly known as the Wichita Wranglers, to Springdale, where they became the Northwest Arkansas Naturals. The Naturals play at Arvest Ballpark.

Ozark United FC, founded in July 2023, are a future pro soccer club planning to start a USL Championship men’s team and USL Super League women’s team to Northwest Arkansas. The teams will play in a new 5,000-seat stadium set to be built near the Pinnacle Hills Promenade in Rogers.

== Demographics ==
Historical population
Census	Pop.	Note	%±
1840	12,151		—
1850	18,503		52.3%
1860	31,719		71.4%
1870	39,328		24.0%
1880	55,627		41.4%
1890	77,142		38.7%
1900	85,731		11.1%
1910	83,334		−2.8%
1920	86,639		4.0%
1930	87,842		1.4%
1940	91,793		4.5%
1950	99,789		8.7%
1960	101,137		1.4%
1970	137,299		35.8%
1980	189,982		38.4%
1990	222,526		17.1%
2000	325,364		46.2%
2010	440,121		35.3%
2020	546,725		24.2%
2025 (est.)	622,177		13.8%
U.S. Decennial Census; 1790–1960 1900–1990; 1990–2000 2010–2016

Region compared to State & U.S.
2010 Census	NWA	Arkansas	U.S.
Total population	463,204	2,915,918	308,745,538
Population change, 2000 to 2010	+33.5%	+9.1%	+9.7%
Population density (people/sqmi)	144.2	54.8	87.4
Median household income (2016)	$51,848	$44,334	$57,617
Bachelor's degree or higher	28.2%	19.5%	25.1%
Foreign born (2016)	10.7%	4.7%	13.7%
White (non-Hispanic)	81.9%	77.0%	72.4%
Black	1.9%	15.3%	12.6%
Hispanic (any race)	14.9%	6.4%	16.3%
Asian	2.3%	1.2%	4.8%

Northwest Arkansas is the second-largest population center in the state, behind Central Arkansas. The two regions rank as 94th and 80th nationally by population, respectively. The region is the fastest-growing in the state, and the 12th fastest-growing in the United States, with a 24.22% growth rate between 2010 and 2020. Rather than a central city with suburbs model, Northwest Arkansas emerged as a unified region of disconnected cities that grew and amalgamated over time. Thus, the official Census Bureau name Fayetteville–Springdale–Rogers Metropolitan Statistical Area is simply a listing of the three largest cities in the region at the time of naming.

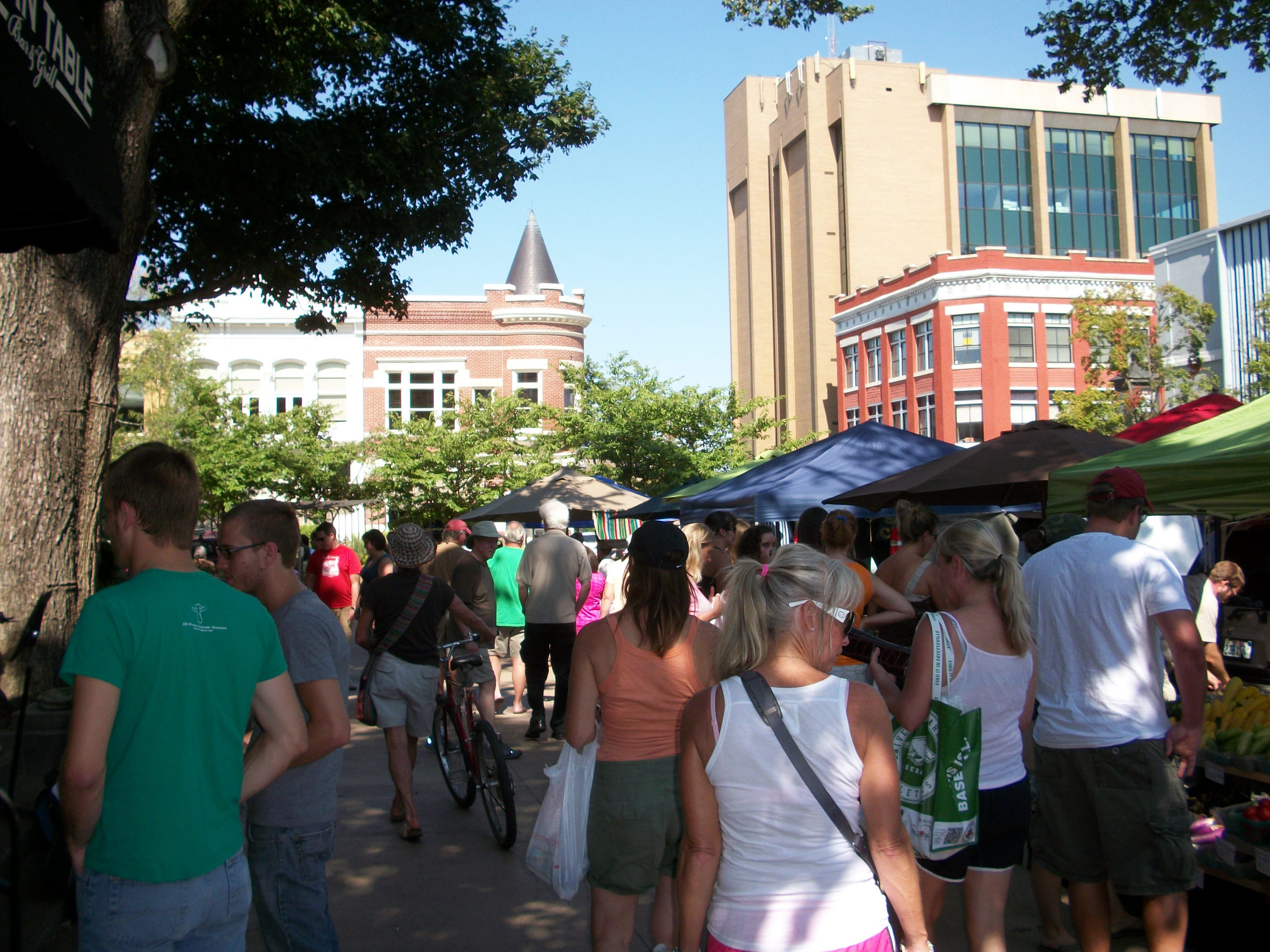
Northwest Arkansas residents and visitors at the Fayetteville Farmer's Market

Over half of Northwest Arkansas's population resides within the largest four cities, Fayetteville, Springdale, Rogers, and Bentonville, with each having demographic characteristics congruent with its largest employer. Fayetteville, home to the University of Arkansas, contains the highest proportion of adults over 25 with a bachelor's degree or higher, at 44.8%, significantly above the other communities, and in line with major metropolitan areas. Bentonville, home to white-collar workers at the Walmart Home Office and the ancillary vendor community, has the highest per-capita income in the region. Springdale and Rogers contained significant manufacturing and construction industries, and a corresponding high percentage of blue-collar workers and major foreign-born populations in 1999. Over 10% of businesses in Springdale and Rogers are Hispanic-owned.

County	Seat	2025 estimate	2020 Census	Change	Area	Density
Benton	Bentonville	332,554	284,333	+16.96%	884 sq mi (2,290 km^{2})	376/sq mi (145/km^{2})
Washington	Fayetteville	271,213	245,871	+10.31%	952 sq mi (2,470 km^{2})	285/sq mi (110/km^{2})
Madison	Huntsville	18,410	16,521	+11.43%	837 sq mi (2,170 km^{2})	22/sq mi (8/km^{2})
Total		622,177	546,725	+13.80%	2,673 sq mi (6,920 km^{2})	233/sq mi (90/km^{2})

=== Race and ethnicity ===
The region is less diverse than Arkansas and United States averages, with a 1.9% black population accounting for much of the proportional difference. The national trends of an increasing non-white proportion of the population and migration from rural areas to urban areas has also been seen in Northwest Arkansas and statewide since the 1990s, though the non-white population growth has lagged national averages. Historically, the northwestern half of the state was predominantly settled by whites in small farms for subsistence agriculture due to the hilly terrain and rocky soils, rather than the slave-intensive labor of plantation agriculture typical in the fertile and flat Arkansas Delta.

Northwest Arkansas institutions have placed different priority on diversity within the region. University of Arkansas Chancellor John A. White designated diversity the top institutional goal in 2010, seeking to create a campus community in line with state and national averages. The Northwest Arkansas Council listed "Promote racial, cultural, and ethnic diversity in Northwest Arkansas" last among priority placemaking objectives within the 2015 strategic plan.

The city of Gentry has a dense community of Hmong Americans, many resettled by the United States after the North Vietnamese invasion of Laos and subsequent Indochina Migration and Refugee Assistance Act. Hmong National Development, a subsidiary of Hmong American Partnership, has an office in Fayetteville and Fairview, Missouri, one county north of the official Northwest Arkansas boundary. Gentry School District was the epicenter of cultural conflicts among Hmong, Hispanic, and white residents in the early 2000s.

Springdale is host to the largest community of Marshall Islanders living outside of the Marshall Islands and is home to a Marshall Islands Consulate.

A 2016 study of blacks and Hispanics in Arkansas cities found median incomes rising for blacks and declining for Hispanics in Bentonville.

=== Sexual orientation and gender identity ===
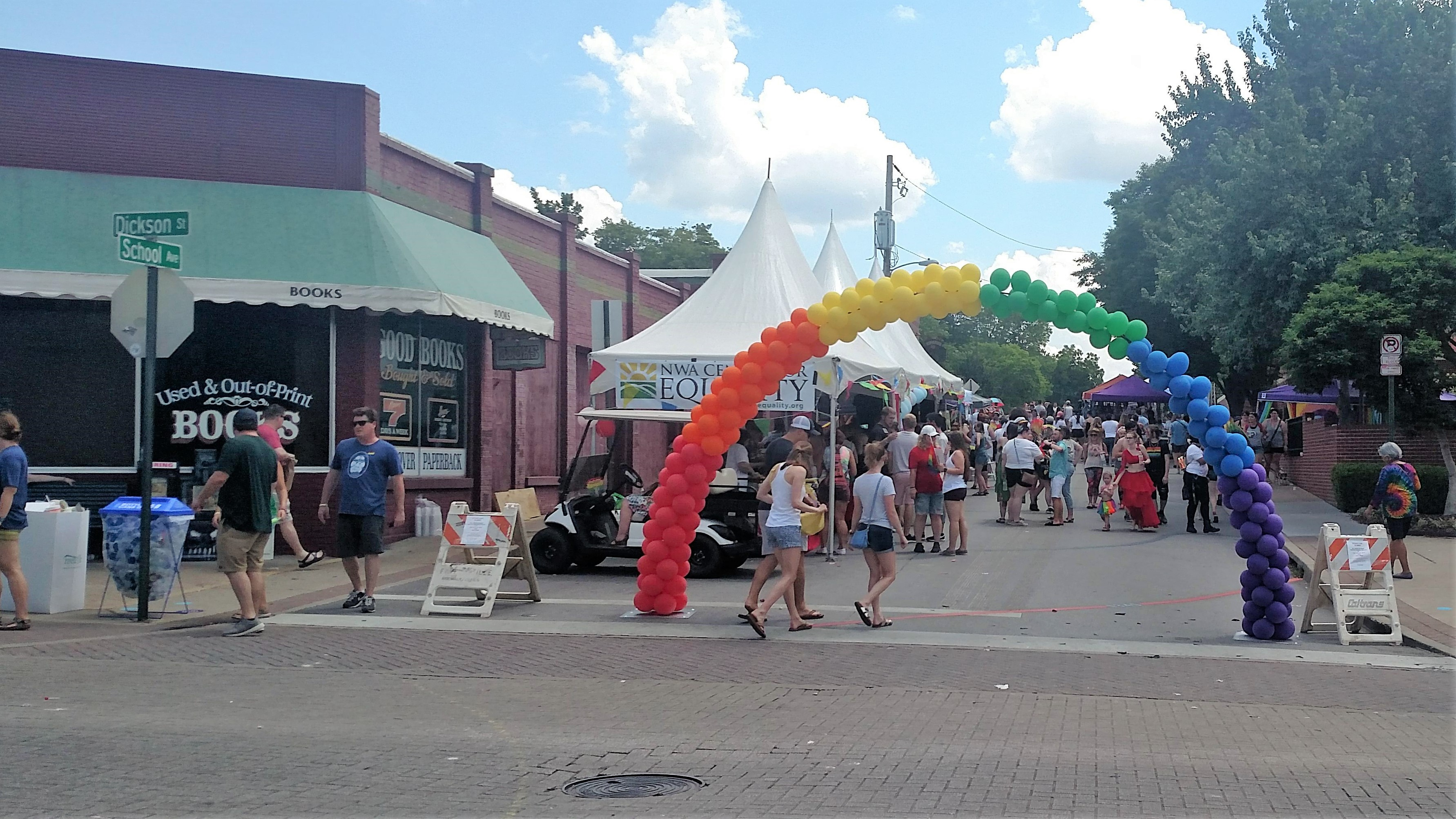
2018 NWA Pride Festival on Dickson Street in Fayetteville

The Northwest Arkansas Center for Equality has sponsored the Northwest Arkansas Pride parade since 2006. The parade runs from the Fayetteville Historic Square down Dickson Street in Fayetteville. A state poll in 2017 showed 84% of Arkansans believe LGBT residents should have equal employment rights, and 78% believing equal rights to housing should be afforded. Arkansan support for equal treatment in adoptions (43%), and gay marriage (35%), were significantly below national averages, 61% and 64%, respectively. Arkansas is one of three states which does not prohibit discrimination based on sexual orientation or gender identity. Fayetteville and Eureka Springs have recently worked to provide legal protections for LGBT residents. Fayetteville has worked legislatively and through the court system since 2014 to establish protections for LGBT residents in the city.

The Fayetteville City Council passed Ordinance 119 in August 2014 by a 6–2 vote at 3:20 am, after an extended public comment period, which included testimony from LGBT residents who had encountered discrimination. Ordinance 119 extended protections, including against termination and eviction, and created a Civil Rights Commission to investigate violations. An opposition group gathered enough signatures to put repealing the ordinance to the voters of Fayetteville, who repealed the ordinance by a 52–48% margin. The City Council put a similar measure, the Uniform Civil Rights Protection Ordinance 5781, to a public vote in September 2015, which passed 53–47%. In the interim, Republican State Senator Bart Hester, who represents northwestern Benton County in Northwest Arkansas, proposed the Intrastate Commerce Improvement Act in response to the Fayetteville Ordinance, which prohibited municipalities in Arkansas from creating new protected classes in Arkansas. The Arkansas General Assembly passed the act, known as Act 137. In February 2017, the Arkansas Supreme Court declared Ordinance 5781 unconstitutional for violating Act 137, but did not rule on the act's constitutionality, which has been questioned. The ruling drew national attention to Arkansas, and comparisons to HB 2 in North Carolina.

Northwest Arkansas' All Out June, a pride festival for its LGBT community, is considered Arkansas' largest, and is organized by the NWA Center for Equality and the NWA Pride Parade Organization.

=== 2000 ===
As of the census of 2000, there were 347,045 people, 131,939 households, and 92,888 families residing within the MSA. The racial makeup of the MSA was 89.70% White, 1.22% African American, 1.53% Native American, 1.19% Asian, 0.29% Pacific Islander, 4.03% from other races, and 2.04% from two or more races. Hispanic or Latino of any race were 8.32% of the population.

Over the past decade or more, Northwest Arkansas has been one of the fastest growing regions in the South.

The median income for a household in the MSA was $32,469, and the median income for a family was $38,118. Males had a median income of $27,025 versus $20,295 for females. The per capita income for the MSA was $16,159.

== Economy ==
The state's population grew 13.7 percent between 1990 and 2000, but the two-county metropolitan statistical area accounted for one-third of that growth. Benton and Washington counties grew 47 percent between 1990 and 2000.

Estimates put the two-county population at roughly 373,055 by December 2004. According to the Bureau of Labor Statistics, in February 2008 the Northwest Arkansas region as a whole had an unemployment rate of 4.1%. This unemployment rate gave Northwest Arkansas a rank of 41 out of 369 metropolitan areas in the United States. Per capita income in Northwest Arkansas is $31,191, according to the most recent figures from the United States Census Bureau. This is approximately $7,000 below the average per capita income.

The region has seen a number of transplants moving to the area from larger metropolitan areas in pursuit of jobs and amenities at a lower cost of living. Wealthy enclaves such as Pinnacle in Rogers and amenities built to cater to transplants to the area have transformed the economies and cultures of Northwest Arkansas's formerly small, quiet towns.

== Human resources ==
=== Education ===
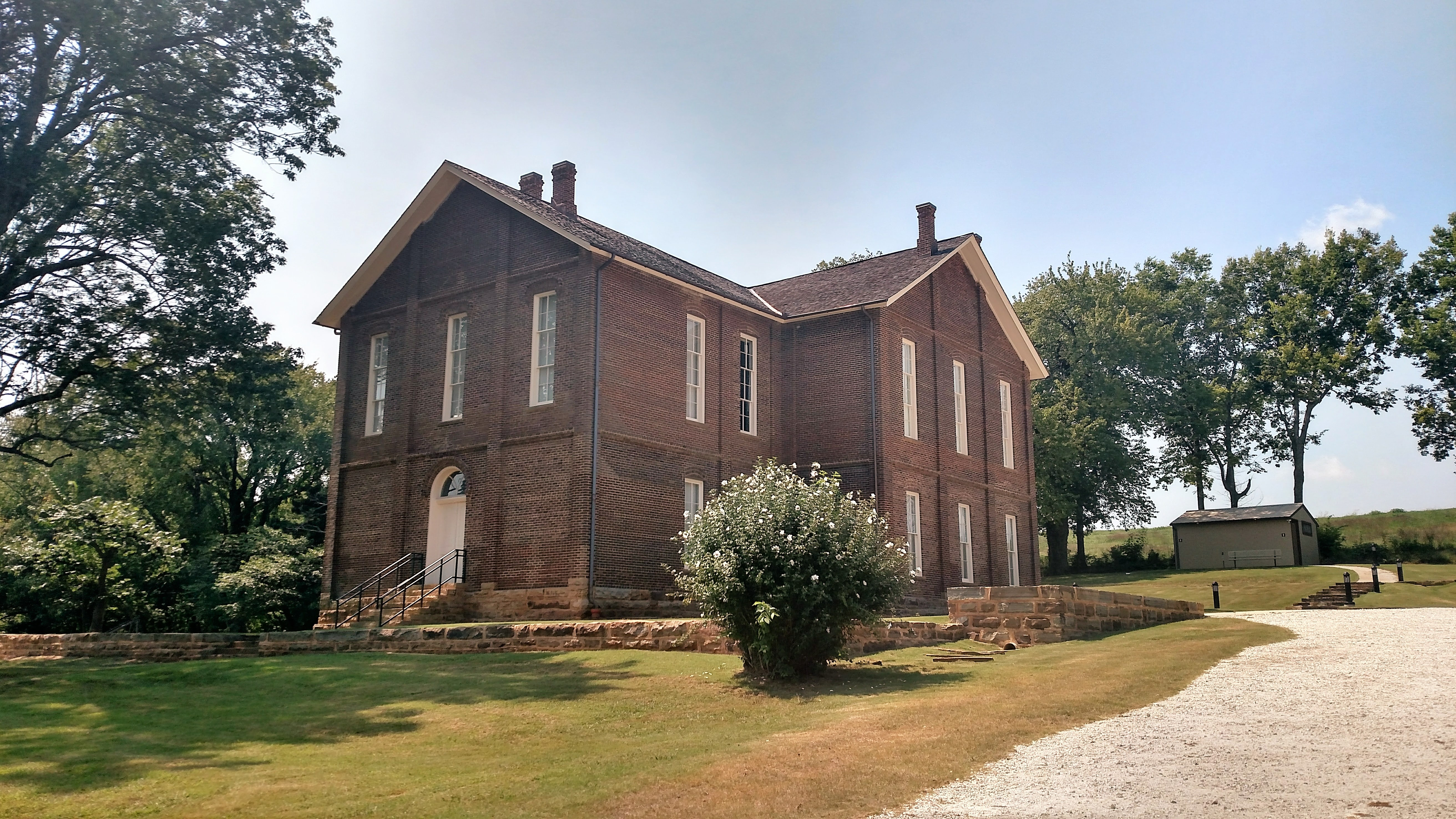
Cane Hill College in Canehill, Arkansas

Northwest Arkansas has a strong tradition of education. Cane Hill College was founded in western Washington County in 1834; the first college in Arkansas, and Arkansas College was founded in Fayetteville in 1850. (Note: Not the same institution as Lyon College, also founded as Arkansas College but in Batesville in 1872.) Though both colleges are now defunct, these institutions laid the groundwork for establishing the University of Arkansas in Fayetteville in 1871, today the largest and best-known university in the state. Seven of the top ten school districts in Arkansas are within Benton or Washington counties, including Haas Hall Academy, a top 100 high school nationwide.

As of July 2016, 85.3% of Northwest Arkansas residents over age 25 held a high school degree or higher and 30.9% holding a bachelor's degree or higher. The Northwest Arkansas rates are above Arkansas averages of 84.8% and 21.1%, and near national averages of 86.7% and 29.8%, respectively. (Note: Calculated using the percentages and overall populations to total for the four-county area.)

==== Primary and secondary education ====
Northwest Arkansas public school districts range from small, rural districts to some of the largest districts in the state. Among the four large cities, each district contains two high schools, with the exception of Fayetteville Public Schools: Bentonville and Bentonville West, Rogers and Rogers Heritage, and Springdale and Springdale Har-Ber. These schools, combined with Fayetteville (and Van Buren from the Arkansas River Valley) constitute the 7A West Conference for athletics, the largest class in the state. The region's growth has led to many new schools throughout the region, including high schools. Rogers Heritage High School was established in 2008, Rogers New Technology High School, and Bentonville West High School opened in 2016.

There are also several private, charter, parochial, and secular schools, including Shiloh Christian School in Springdale.

==== Higher education ====
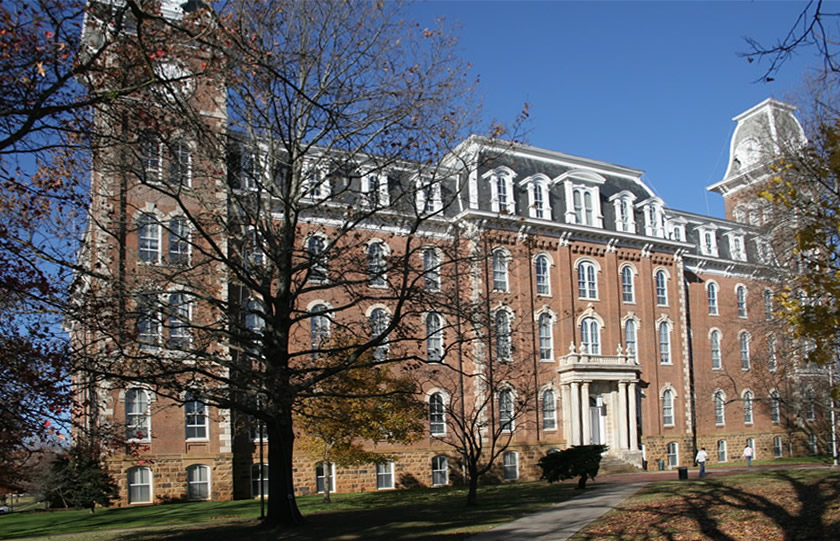
Old Main, original University of Arkansas building.

- University of Arkansas
  - The University of Arkansas (UA) is a public co-educational land-grant university. It is the flagship campus of the University of Arkansas System and is located in Fayetteville, Arkansas. It is noted for its strong architecture, agriculture (particularly poultry science), creative writing, and business programs. Sports are also important to the university, as they are home to the Arkansas Razorbacks.
- John Brown University
- Northwest Arkansas Community College (NWACC)
- Ecclesia College

==== Public library systems ====
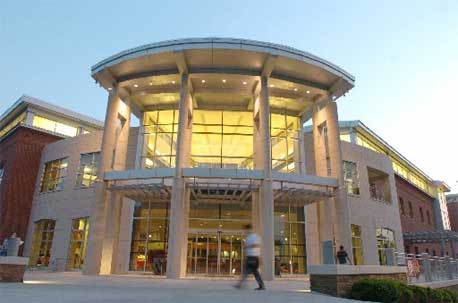
Entrance of the nationally recognized Fayetteville Public Library.

The Fayetteville Public Library is the largest library in Northwest Arkansas. The other libraries in Washington County have formed the Washington County Library System (WCLS).

== Infrastructure ==
=== Surface transportation ===
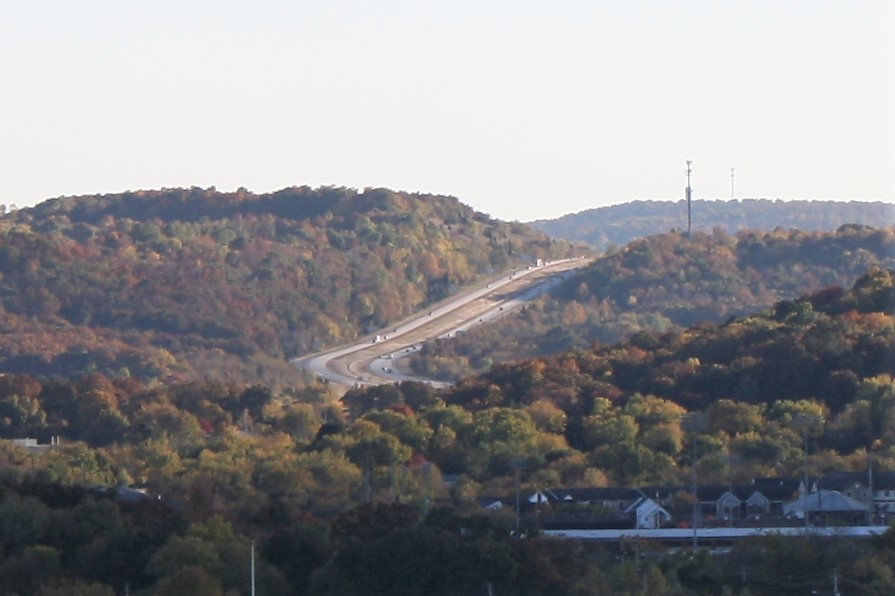
I-49 runs south from Fayetteville into the Boston Mountains

The region is mainly served by Interstate 49. A widening of I-49 to six lanes and improvements to interchanges, including Arkansas's first single-point urban interchange at Exit 85 , are currently in the final stages . Other major highways that serve the area include US 62, US 71, US 71B, and US 412B.

=== Aviation ===
Northwest Arkansas National Airport (often referred to by its IATA airport code, XNA) is the primary commercial service airport in the region. The facility opened in 1998, supplanting Drake Field in Greenland, which remains as a general aviation facility. XNA has one concourse, with twelve gates. The three most popular destinations for the year-long period ending June 2017 were Dallas/Fort Worth International Airport, Hartsfield–Jackson Atlanta International Airport, and O'Hare International Airport, hubs for American Airlines, Delta Air Lines, and United Airlines, respectively. The Northwest Arkansas Council has prioritized attracting a low-cost carrier to the airport, and has had relative success with Allegiant Air, which offers eight destinations from the airport.

The region has seven smaller, public use general aviation airports, including Drake Field, Rogers Executive Airport, Springdale Municipal Airport, Bentonville Municipal Airport, Siloam Springs Municipal Airport, Crystal Lake Airport, and Huntsville Municipal Airport. Beaver Lake Aviation, a wholly owned subsidiary of Walmart, is based in Rogers.

=== Mass transit ===
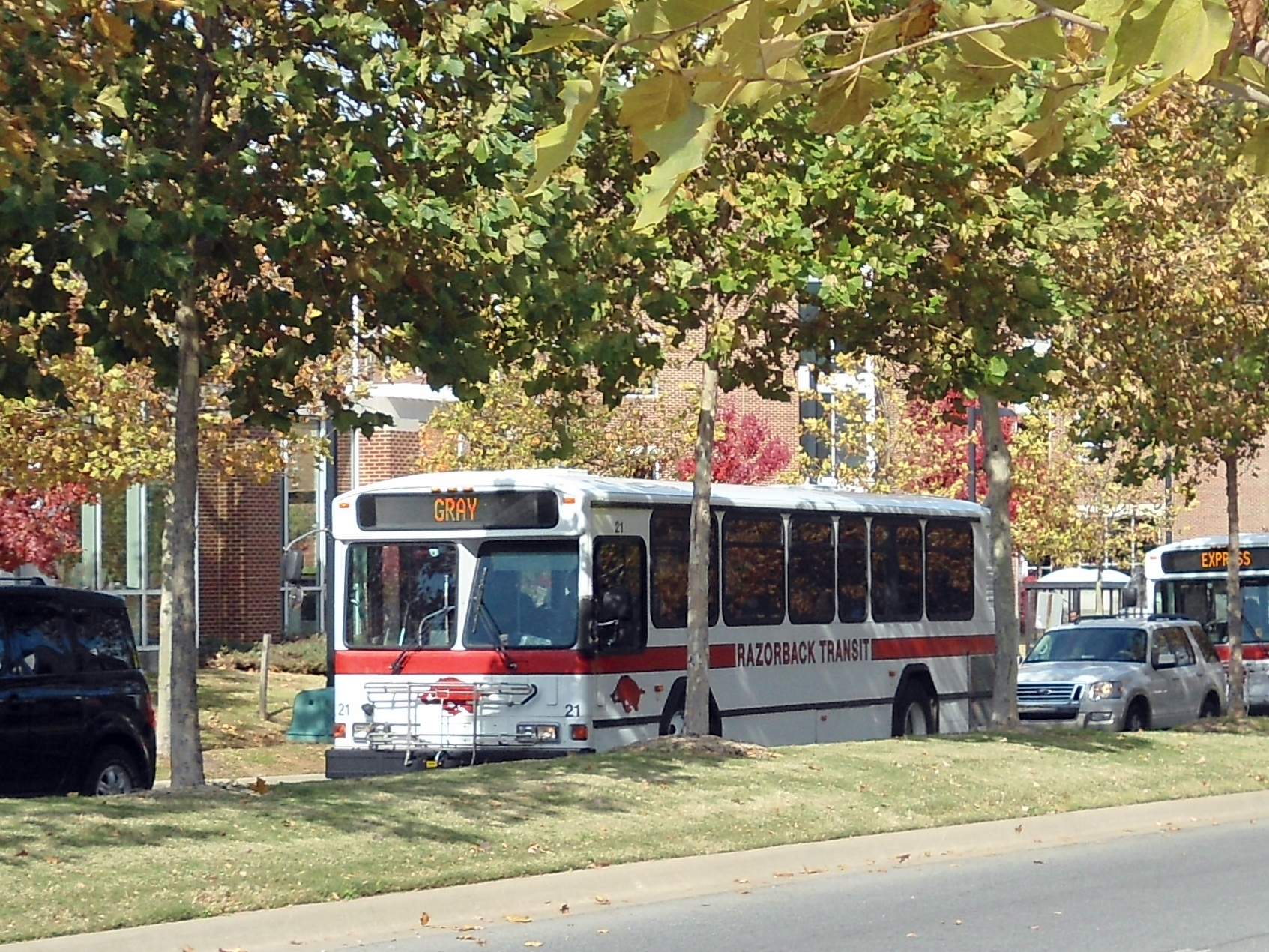
Razorback Transit bus on the campus of the University of Arkansas

Two public transit agencies serve the area; Ozark Regional Transit is a general transit agency with around a dozen local routes, plus commuter, paratransit, and special purpose routes. Razorback Transit primarily serves University of Arkansas students, is fare-free, and has a service area limited to Fayetteville. It is also open to the general public.

Intercity bus service is provided by Jefferson Lines in Fayetteville.

== See also ==
- Crystal Bridges Museum of American Art
- McDonald Territory, a failed attempt by McDonald County, Missouri to leave Missouri and become part of Arkansas in 1961
- Walton Arts Center
