= Lake Fayetteville =

Lake Fayetteville Dam
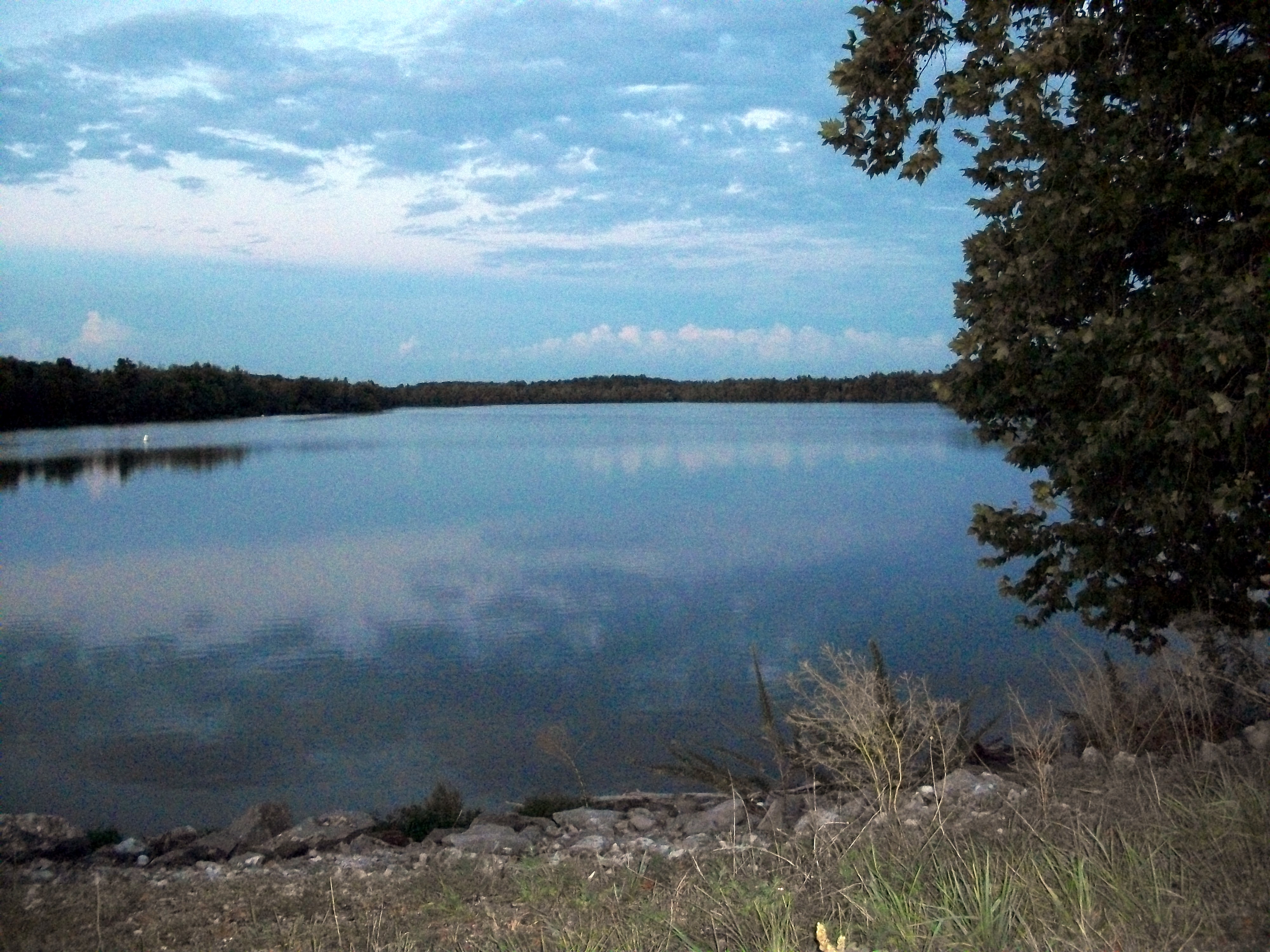
- View of the lake from the dam

- Location within Arkansas
- Country: United States
- Location: Fayetteville, Arkansas
- Coordinates: 36°8′8″N 94°8′21″W
- Status: Open
- Construction began: 1949
- Owner: City of Fayetteville

Reservoir
- Creates: Lake Fayetteville
- Normal elevation: 1,237 feet (377 m)

Lake Fayetteville is a reservoir of Clear Creek created by Lake Fayetteville Dam in 1949 in Fayetteville, Arkansas. Bordered on the north by Springdale, the lake was created as a water supply for the City of Fayetteville, but now serves as recreational lake surrounded by residential neighborhoods and as a focal point along the Razorback Regional Greenway for cyclists and trail users throughout Northwest Arkansas.

== History ==
Lake Fayetteville was used as a water supply for Fayetteville until the creation of Beaver Water District, a regional provider whose source is Beaver Lake.

The Clear Creek watershed contains rapidly developing areas of both cities; as a result, stormwater washes sediment and dissolved nutrients into Lake Fayetteville, including nitrogen and phosphorus. The lake has undergone eutrophication, and occasionally has toxic algal blooms. The variables that best predict these blooms have historically been increased water temperatures, low inorganic nitrogen concentrations, and an intermediate molar ratio of nitrogen to phosphorus.

== Amenities ==
Lake Fayetteville has a marina operated by the City of Fayetteville and fishing piers. The lake contains bass, crappie, carp, bluegill, and catfish.

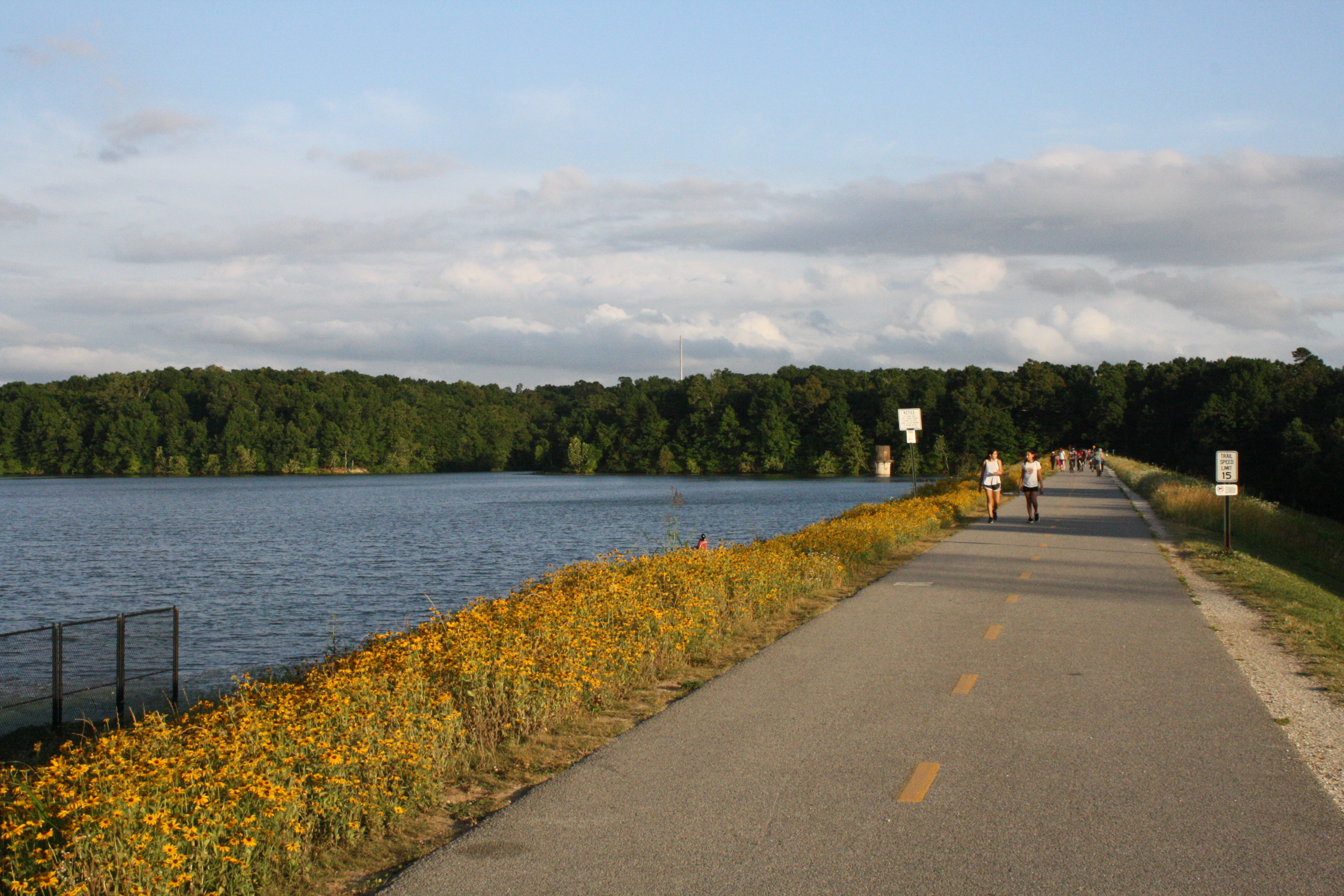
Trail along the dam

The lake has long had a nature trail around the lake, including passing through the Botanical Garden of the Ozarks. The Lake Fayetteville Nature Trail is a dirt path with tree markers passing through the oak-hickory forest typical of the Ozark Mountains. The first segment of paved trail connecting to the Razorback Regional Greenway was completed in 2007, with a full 4.5 miles (7.2 km) paved trail around the lake completed in 2013. The nature trail was rehabilitated and expanded into a mountain biking trail beginning in 2010.

Students from Fayetteville Public Schools and Springdale Public Schools have jointly studied the water for biology and hydrology classes using the Springdale-Fayetteville Center for the Study of Aquatic Resources on the lake since 1974.

After a risk-based inspection by the Arkansas Natural Resources Commission describing a consequence of failure submerging the city of Johnson, Arkansas, the City of Fayetteville removed many large sycamore trees from the dam in 2017, and planted wildflowers.
