= Bikes Blues and BBQ =

Motorcycle rally in Arkansas

Coordinates: 36°03′59″N 94°09′56″W

Bikes, Blues & BBQ Logo

Bikes Blues & BBQ (alternatively named Bikes Blues and Barbecue, or abbreviated BBB or BBBBQ) is an annual motorcycle rally held in Northwest Arkansas centered on Rogers, usually in late September.

== Charitable Contributions ==
The event was billed as the "Largest US Charity Rally", although there have long been questions about the overall scale of this support: In 2006 and 2007, the event raised $100,000 (an estimated $0.25-$0.30 per attendee); in 2008 charitable contributions were suspended despite record attendance. In 2009 contributions totalled $48,500, or approximately $0.15 per attendee. In the 2010 press release announcing the organization had raised a total of $80,000 from 400,000 attendees, its director Nelson Driver was quoted as saying "This is what it’s all about." In 2016, Bikes Blues & BBQ contributed the most money to date, $230,000 generated from an estimated 350,000 participants, or about 65 cents per attendee.

Bikes, Blues, and BBQ raised nearly $0.24 for charity and another $0.19 in sales tax per attendee over twenty years.

== Safety ==
The festival had a good safety record. In 2011, there were no reported fatalities.

== Controversies ==
Repeatedly, citizens of Fayetteville "have argued whether the event is right for Fayetteville's small business community." Paradoxically many local business owners reported steep declines in revenue during the event.

With an aging ridership and declining attendance, Executive Director Tommy Sisemore said "We have definitely tried to evolve the rally to attract new usership.", having stated "I wouldn't have taken the job if I didn't think the rally was sustainable." "We call it 'playing dress-up' around here... we don't expect the Hells Angels," says Sisemore.

In 2017, the rally organizers banned Confederate flag and Nazi merchandise from being sold by official vendors, inspected each day for any "lewd or offensive" material by an off duty police officer. However white supremacist merchandise remained on sale in 2019.

With fewer attendees, organizers tried to incorporate programming suitable for families. However, as reported in the Arkansas Democrat Gazette in 2019, a mother

... said she and her family aren't overly sensitive or easily offended. It just wasn't what they expected in the middle of the day. "If it were not advertised as family friendly, that wouldn't have bothered me," [she] said. "I've been to bike rallies. I expect to see that. But when you advertise as family friendly, that shouldn't be ... it was like taking children to a bar."

The organizers of Bikes Blues & BBQ have estimated attendance as having grown from 200,000 participants in 2004, 300,000 in 2005, 400,000 participants for a few years in the late 2000s, declining in subsequent years.

In 2016, the Fayetteville City Council considered an ordinance that would force discussion of the impact of large festivals such as Bikes Blues and BBQ on local businesses. However, despite BBBBQ's negative impact on most small business owners, no public reason was given for this ordinance being tabled indefinitely, and to date there has never been a public forum to discuss the impact of the festival on small business owners and downtown residents.

The City of Fayetteville has not tracked sales-tax revenue but estimated the rally brought in approximately $80,000 in sales taxes in recent years; some have questioned why this amounted to just $10 in taxed sales — $0.20 in taxes — per attendee.

A sister festival, Bikes Babes and Bling, was first held July 1–3, 2010, also in Fayetteville. The City of Fayetteville provided subsidies to both the 2010 and 2011 Bikes Babes and Bling festivals. In 2010 the sister festival drew approximately 5000 participants; the Northwest Arkansas Times reported that "only a few dozen people" were at the site midday on the main day of the 2011 festival.

In addition to the rally, there were many bands, a parade, a bike show, a bike giveaway, barbecues, the Bikes, Blues, and BBQ Babes contest, and many other official and unofficial events. Its organizers claimed the rally was second only to Sturgis.
