= Arts Center of the Ozarks =

Arts organization in Springdale, AR

Arts One Presents
- Arts One Presents logo
- Address: 224 W Huntsville Avenue; Springdale, Arkansas; USA

Construction
- Opened: 1967

Website
- www.artsonepresents.org

Arts One Presents, formerly Arts Center of the Ozarks, is a theater company based in Springdale, Arkansas. It is best known for its community theater productions, along with music and visual arts. The organization began as the Springdale Fine Arts Council in 1967, initially being one of the only community theatres in Northwest Arkansas.

After opening, the ACO has shown a wide variety of shows, including: local community shows, traveling shows and the American Girl Fashion Show.

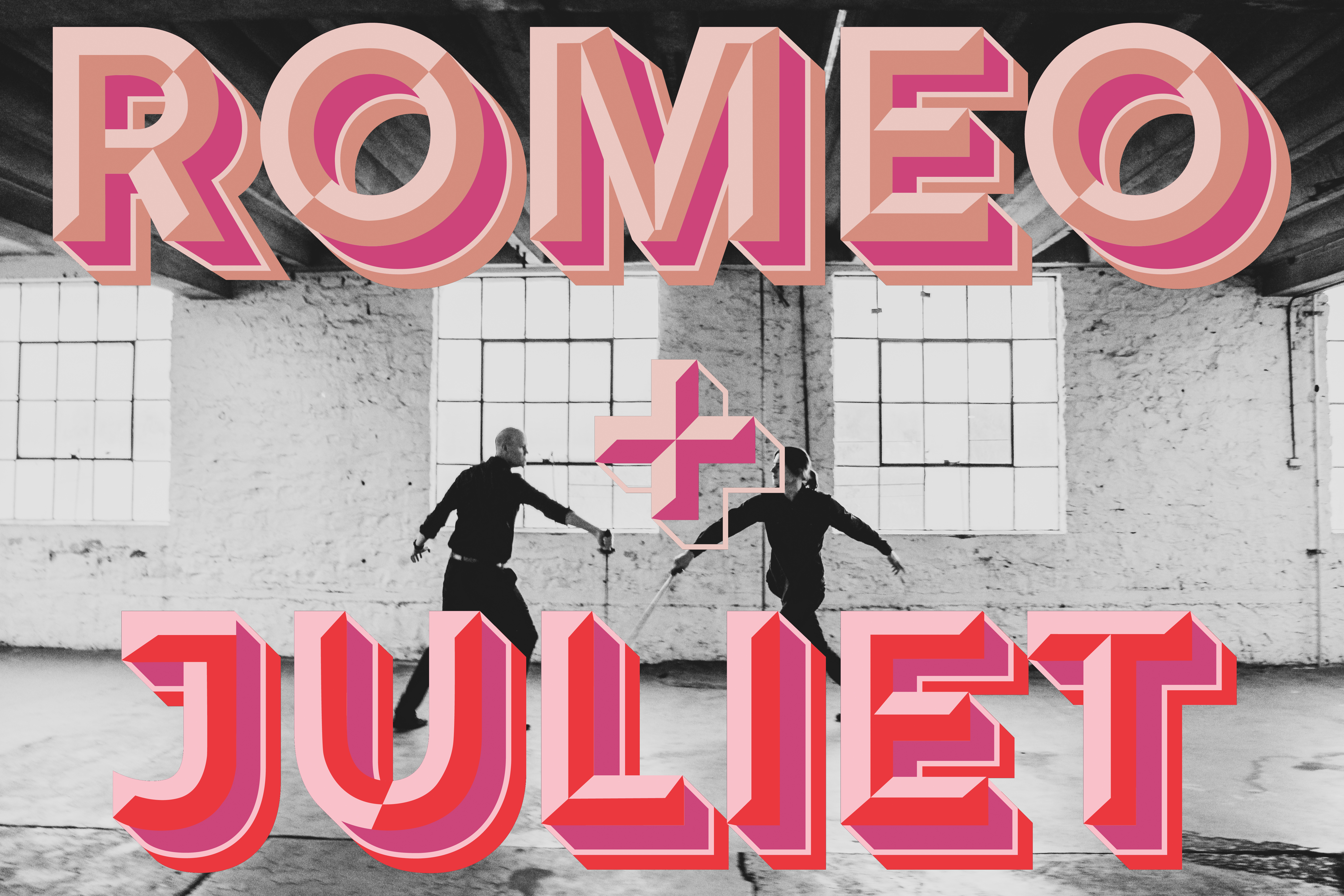
Arts One Presents "Romeo + Juliet" April 20-24, 2022
