= Botanical Garden of the Ozarks =

Botanical garden in Fayetteville, Arkansas

- Interactive map of Botanical Garden of the Ozarks
- Type: Botanical garden
- Location: Fayetteville, Arkansas, United States
- Nearest city: Fayetteville
- Area: 44 acres (18 ha)
- Opened: 2007
- Operator: Nonprofit 501(c)(3)
- Status: Open to the public
- Website: www.bgozarks.org

The Botanical Garden of the Ozarks (BGO) is a non-profit 501(c)(3) organization located on the east side of Lake Fayetteville in Fayetteville, Arkansas, United States. The 44-acre (18 ha) site is situated along Arkansas Highway 265, near the border of Fayetteville and Springdale. It is the first botanical garden in Northwest Arkansas.

Approximately six acres (2.4 ha) of the site are developed gardens. The grounds feature 12 individual gardens, each designed around a different theme, intended to inspire and educate visitors with ideas that may be applied in home landscapes. The Garden is also home to the only butterfly house in the state of Arkansas, where visitors can observe seasonal butterfly life cycles.

The Botanical Garden of the Ozarks operates as a member-supported, nonprofit public garden with an emphasis on education and environmental awareness. The Garden offers year-round programs, classes, community events, and school field trips for visitors of all ages. It also serves as a regional venue for private events and weddings and has been recognized by CitiScapes Magazine as a “Top 10 Best Place to Get Married” and a “Top 5 Best Family & Kids Attraction.”

== Garden description ==
The Botanical Garden of the Ozarks was incorporated in 1994 and opened to the public in 2007. The first phase of development included nine “Backyard Gardens,” created to demonstrate garden design concepts suitable for home use. These initial gardens were the Japanese Garden, Vegetable and Herb Garden, Children’s Garden, Four Seasons Garden, Shade Garden, Rose and Perennial Garden, Ozark Native Garden, Sensory Garden, and Rock and Water Garden. Additional gardens and features have since been added, including the Founders Garden, the Reading Railroad, the Education Cottage Garden, and the Butterfly House and Garden.
