= Walmart Arkansas Music Pavilion =

Outdoor amphitheater, Rogers, Arkansas, USA

Coordinates: 36.30292°N 94.1838°W

- Walmart AMP
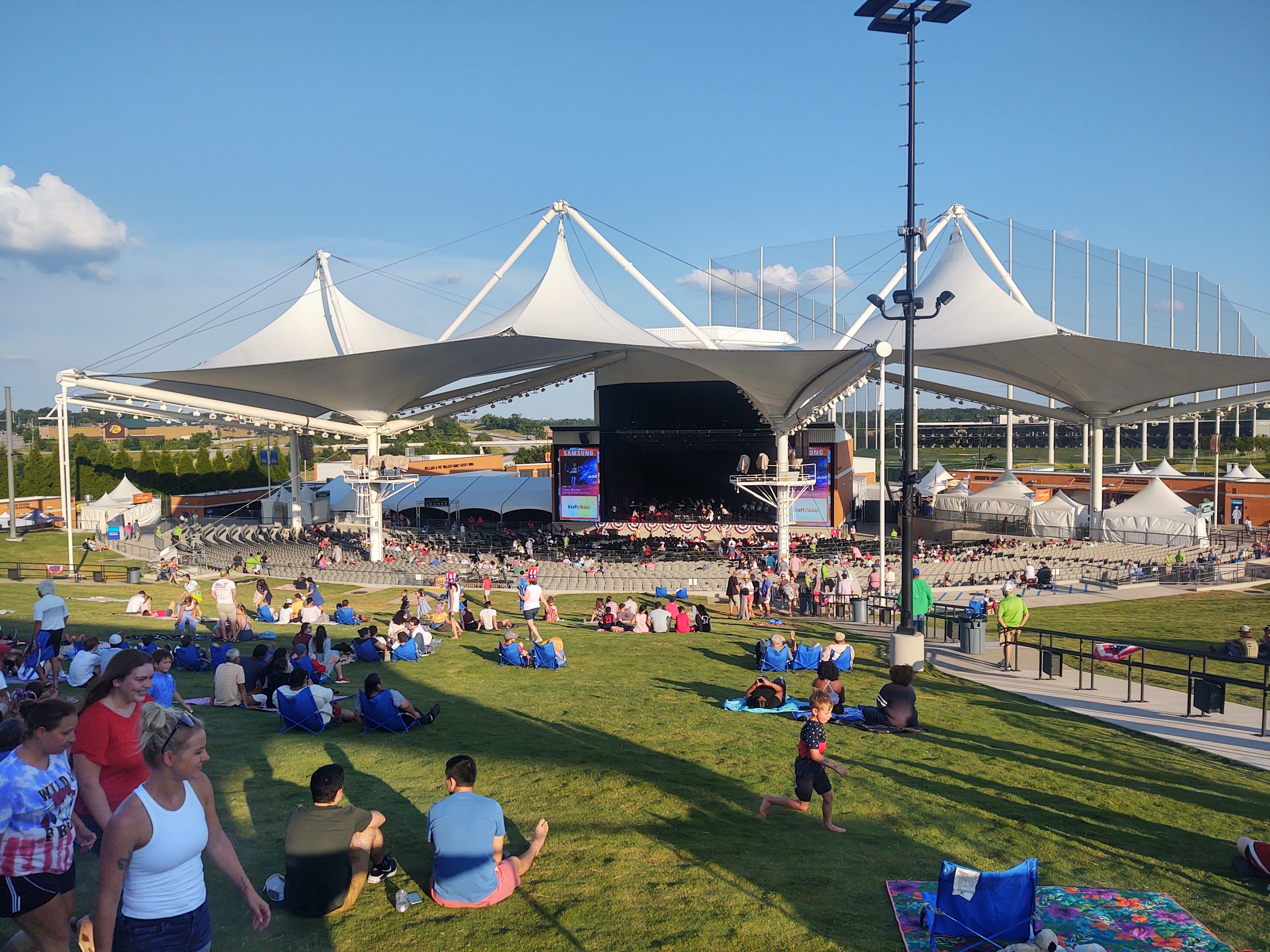
- Interactive map of Walmart Arkansas Music Pavilion
- Former names: Arkansas Music Pavilion (2005-14)
- Address: 5079 W Northgate Rd; Rogers, AR 72758-1425
- Location: Pinnacle Hills
- Owner: Walton Arts Center Council
- Capacity: 11,000

Construction
- Groundbreaking: October 2013
- Opened: June 7, 2014
- Expanded: 2016
- Cost: $11.5 million ($15.9 million in 2025 dollars)
- Architect: Core Architects
- Structural engineer: Tatum-Smith Engineers
- Services engineer: Crafton Tull
- General contractor: Crossland Construction

Website
- Venue Website

The Walmart Arkansas Music Pavilion (originally known as the Arkansas Music Pavilion and commonly known as the Walmart AMP) is an outdoor amphitheater located in Rogers, Arkansas. The venue opened in June 2005 as a semi-permanent venue, becoming a permanent venue in 2014. Its capacity is 11,000 fans.

It opened June 7, 2014, with a performance by Blake Shelton and Hunter Hayes.

== History ==
The Arkansas Music Pavilion was created in 2005 as a concept inspired by some of the most well known amphitheater's in the country including the Cape Cod Melody Tent (MA), The Universal Lending Pavilion (CO) and the Aspen Music Tent (CO) and The Boston Harbor Lights Pavilion (MA). These concepts generally combined a covered seating area and lawn seating. The original concept for a seasonal, semi-permanent concert venue was created by Dan White, Amy Mack White and Kelly Rourke which combined the features of an architecturally interesting canopy, theater style box seating, and no seat that was farther than 120 feet from the stage. The venue structure was designed by Tentnolology from Vancouver, Canada. The original venue had 2,533 seats under the pavilion. The entry into the market was discussed with the Walton Arts Center and was designed to become "collaborative and never competitive" with the Walton Arts Center. It was thought that the two venues together could create a year-round arts infrastructure for the region.

The AMP was unanimously approved by the City of Fayetteville under Mayor Dan Coody and was embraced by the Fayetteville Economic Development Council as a driver of tourism and arts development for the region. It opened to the public on Father's Day weekend in 2005 with headliners America and The Doobie Brothers. The original venue was located on the bluff behind the Northwest Arkansas Mall overlooking the city of Fayetteville. The land lease was set at $1 with Alice Church, manager of the mall who believed the concept would drive economic impact to the mall and the region. The venue operated at this location for four seasons from 2005 to 2009, with the original ownership team consisting of Dan & Amy White, Kelly Rourke, Joseph Boskus and Robbie Bader. Each season had 10 headlining national tours. The venue was independently owned and operated. The "AMP" became one of the fastest growing music venues in the country and renowned national tour stop between Kansas City and Dallas. In its second season it became the largest outdoor venue in the State of Arkansas. The venue played host to several community fundraising events including a respite shelter for Hurricane Katina, integral in the Bikes Blues and BBQ Festival and the backdrop for the reality TV show "Daly Days" on the Golf Channel.

In 2009, the venue was sold to Suzie Stephens and Brian Crowne by remaining partners Joseph Boskus, Dan White and Amy White. Brian Crowne had been involved from the inception as a fellow venue owner of George's Majestic Lounge, who acted as a credible advisor to the region's music scene. The original owners stayed on in a consulting capacity for the first year. In 2011, the music venue was purchased by the Walton Arts Center. Failed contract negotiations lead to moving the structure to the Washington County Fairgrounds for 2012 and 2013 seasons. The move saw a dramatic increase in ticket sales and overall turnout for events. In January 2013, the Walton Arts Center Council announced plans build a permanent structure for the amphitheater. This location was one of the original locations that the original creators had discussions with as a visible symbol or arts and entertainment for the region. Wanting to remain in Northwest Arkansas, many locations were viewed however the decision was made to build in Rogers near the Pinnacle Hills Promenade. Construction began in late October 2013, with plans to complete in June 2014. In early 2014, Walmart, Inc purchased naming rights to the venue.

== Performers ==
=== 2005 ===
- America
- The Doobie Brothers
- Third Day
- 38 Special
- Patty Loveless
- Lee Ann Womack
- Robert Earl Keen

=== 2006 ===
- The All-American Rejects
- Rick Springfield
- Gin Blossoms
- Doug Stone
- Loverboy
- Saving Jane
- SHeDAISY
- Lyle Lovett
- The Beach Boys

=== 2007 ===
- REO Speedwagon
- Earth, Wind & Fire
- k.d. lang
- Collective Soul
- Air Supply

=== 2008 ===
- OneRepublic
- KC and the Sunshine Band
- Cross Canadian Ragweed
- Ween
- Pat Benatar
- The Black Crowes
- G. Love & Special Sauce
- Eddie Money
- Jason Aldean
- Ani DiFranco
- Gary Allan

=== 2009 ===
- The Marshall Tucker Band
- Molly Hatchet
- Collin Raye
- Ghostland Observatory
- Peter Frampton
- LeAnn Rimes
- Ben Folds
- Queensrÿche
- Darius Rucker
- Cake
- Cross Canadian Ragweed

=== 2010 ===
- Levon Helm
- Blue Öyster Cult
- Indigo Girls
- Goo Goo Dolls
- Ted Nugent
- Gary Allan
- Eli Young Band
- Colbie Caillat
- STS9
- Cross Canadian Ragweed
- Luke Bryan
- Bret Michaels
- Pat Travers & Rick Derringer
- The Black Crowes

=== 2011 ===
- Pretty Lights
- Lucinda Williams
- The Band Perry
- Primus
- David Crowder Band
- Rodney Carrington
- The B-52's
- Rick Springfield
- Charlie Daniels Band
- Candlebox
- Jamey Johnson
- Needtobreathe

=== 2012 ===
- Big Gigantic
- Hank Williams Jr.
- Cake
- Jamey Johnson
- Five Finger Death Punch
- Wilco
- Luke Bryan
- Ted Nugent
- Colbie Caillat & Gavin DeGraw
- Daughtry
- Candlebox
- Miranda Lambert
- Brantley Gilbert
- The Avett Brothers

=== 2013 ===
- Little Big Town
- Old Crow Medicine Show
- Gary Allan
- Summerland Tour
- Easton Corbin
- Three Days Grace
- Alabama Shakes
- The Black Crowes
- Lynyrd Skynyrd
- Vampire Weekend
- ZZ Top

=== 2014 ===
- Blake Shelton
- Darius Rucker
- Dierks Bentley
- Willie Nelson
- Miranda Lambert
- Steely Dan
- Pepe Aguilar
- Steve Martin
- Tim McGraw
- Boston
- Cheech & Chong
- Foreigner
- Jake Owen
- The Avett Brothers
- Santana
- Foster The People

=== 2015 ===
- Jackson Browne
- TobyMac
- Kid Rock
- Bryan Adams
- Hozier
- Pedro Fernández
- Hank Williams Jr.
- Whitesnake
- Fifth Harmony
- Kenny Chesney
- Widespread Panic
- Colbie Caillat
- Lady Antebellum
- Third Eye Blind & Dashboard Confessional
- Steve Miller Band
- Dave Matthews Band
- Chicago
- Needtobreathe
- Brantley Gilbert

=== 2016 ===
- Twenty One Pilots
- Journey
- Kenny Chesney
- Miranda Lambert
- Jason Aldean
- Korn
- Darius Rucker
- Rachel Platten
- Ellie Goulding
- Widespread Panic
- Chris Stapleton
- Meghan Trainor
- Kevin Hart
- Weezer & Panic! At the Disco
- The Lumineers

=== 2017 ===
- Blink-182
- Boston
- Bush
- Travis Scott
- Kidz Bop
- Train
- Mary J. Blige
- ZZ Top
- Elle King
- Third Eye Blind
- Hank Williams Jr.
- Steve Miller Band & Peter Frampton
- Rascal Flats
- Tedeschi Trucks Band
- Straight No Chaser & Postmodern Jukebox
- Lady Antebellum
- Brad Paisley
- Matchbox Twenty & the Counting Crows
- Zac Brown Band
- Sublime with Rome & The Offspring
- Kiss

=== 2018 ===
- Janet Jackson
- Macklemore & Kesha
- Thirty Seconds to Mars
- Halsey
- Chris Stapleton
- Pentatonix
- Niall Horan
- 5 Seconds of Summer
- Slayer
- Alan Jackson
- Ringo Starr & His All-Starr Band
- Needtobreathe
- Lynyrd Skynyrd
- Odesza
- Brantley Gilbert
- Primus & Mastodon
- Dave Matthews Band
- Jim Gaffigan
- Ray LaMontagne
- Chris Stapleton
- Chicago & REO Speedwagon
- Kenny Chesney
- Modest Mouse
- Weezer & Pixies
- G-Eazy
- Coheed and Cambria & Taking Back Sunday
- Keith Urban
- Charlie Puth
- Weezer

=== 2019 ===
- Chris Tomlin
- Santana
- Leon Bridges
- The Killers
- Earth, Wind & Fire
- The Avett Brothers
- Florida Georgia Line
- Steve Miller Band with Marty Stuart and His Fabulous Superlatives
- Trevor Noah
- Train & Goo Goo Dolls
- Brad Paisley
- Young the Giant & Fitz and the Tantrums
- Alabama
- Hootie and The Blowfish
- Chris Young
- Yes, ASIA, John Lodge of The Moody Blues, Carl Palmer's ELP Legacy
- Third Eye Blind & Jimmy Eat World
- Why Don't We
- Sublime with Rome and Michael Franti
- Alan Jackson
- +LIVE+ & Bush
- Thomas Rhett
- Nelly, TLC & Flo-Rida
- The Smashing Pumpkins and Noel Gallagher's High Flying Birds
- Sheryl Crow and Jason Isbell & The 400 Unit
- Rascal Flatts
- Breaking Benjamin with Chevelle, Three Days Grace
- Maze featuring Frankie Beverly with Lalah Hathaway and Johnny Gill
- Luke Combs

=== 2021 ===
- Chicago
- Lindsey Stirling
- Phish
- Lady A
- The Black Crowes
- The Avett Brothers
- Alanis Morissette
- Chris Tomlin
- Luke Bryan
- Jim Gaffigan
- Trippie Redd
- Pitbull and Iggy Azalea
- Jason Aldean
- Brothers Osborne
- Counting Crows
- Megadeth & Lamb of God
- 3 Doors Down
- Shinedown
- Machine Gun Kelly
- Thomas Rhett
- Dave Matthews Band
- NF
- Needtobreathe
- Jonas Brothers
- Dierks Bentley
- Gary Clark, Jr.
- Slipknot

=== 2022 ===
- Nathaniel Ratliff and the Night Sweats
- Tim McGraw
- Miranda Lambert & Little Big Town
- Whiskey Myers
- for KING & COUNTRY
- Halsey
- Cody Jinks
- CHEER Live
- Jimmy Buffett and the Coral Reefer Band
- Steely Dan
- Backstreet Boys
- Goo Goo Dolls & Blue October
- Chicago & Brian Wilson
- Cody Johnson
- ZZ Top
- Kenny Chesney
- Outlaw Music Festival with Willie Nelson with Brothers Osborne, Steve Earle and Allison Russell
- Maverick City Music & Kirk Franklin
- An Evening with James Taylor & his All Star Band
- Darius Rucker
- Train & Jewel
- Josh Groban
- 5 Seconds of Summer
- Chris Stapleton
- Encanto Live
- Big Time Rush
- Dierks Bentley
- Wiz Khalifa & Logic
- OneRepublic & Needtobreathe
- Halestorm
- Keith Urban
- Morgan Wallen
- Goo Goo Dolls
- Alice in Chains & Breaking Benjamin
- Koe Wetzel
- The Chicks
- Five Finger Death Punch
- The Black Keys

=== 2023 ===
- Walker Hayes
- Tyler Childers
- Parker McCollum
- Godsmack
- Dave Matthews Band
- Incubus with Coheed and Cambria
- Foo Fighters
- The Avett Brothers
- Matchbox Twenty
- Outlaw Music Festival with Willie Nelson, Margo Price & Flatland Cavalry
- Fall Out Boy
- Foreigner
- Snoop Dogg, Wiz Khalifa, Too $hort & More
- Nickelback
- Eric Church
- Lynyrd Skynyrd & ZZ Top
- Disturbed
- Lana Del Rey
- Luke Bryan
- Boy George and Culture Club, Howard Jones & Berlin
- Pantera
- The Smashing Pumpkins
- Beck & Phoenix
- Kidz Bop
- Sam Hunt
- Jelly Roll
- Peso Pluma
- 3 Doors Down
- Star Wars: The Empire Strikes Back in Concert
- Tenacious D
- Jason Aldean
- Queens of the Stone Age
- Koe Wetzel
- Shinedown
- Odesza
- The All-American Rejects
- An Evening with Sting

=== 2024 ===
- Hozier
- Riley Green
- Greta Van Fleet
- Needtobreathe
- Parker McCollum
- Brooks and Dunn
- Whiskey Myers
- 21 Savage
- Hardy
- Hootie and the Blowfish
- Maggie Rogers
- Dierks Bentley
- Styx & Foreigner
- New Kids on the Block
- Bert Kreisher's Fully Loaded Comedy Festival
- Pixies & Modest Mouse
- Sarah McLauchlan
- The Doobie Brothers
- Cage the Elephant & Young the Giant
- Niall Horan
- Kidz Bop Live
- Tate McRae
- Hawthorne Heights
- Lindsey Stirling
- Third Eye Blind & Yellowcard
- Megadeth
- Halestorm & I Prevail
- Lainey Wilson
- Five Finger Death Punch
- Lauren Daigle
- Jane's Addiction & Love and Rockets
- +LIVE+ & Stone Temple Pilots
- Sammy Hagar
- Dan + Shay
- Glass Animals
- Creed
- Nelly
- Rob Zombie & Alice Cooper
- Ivan Cornejo
- Billy Idol & Nile Rodgers and Chic
- Chappell Roan
- Justin Moore & Randy Houser
- Melissa Etheridge & Jewel
- Sturgill Simpson
- Meghan Trainor
- Kehlani
- Post Malone
- Benson Boone
- Don Toliver
- Nathaniel Rateliff and the Night Sweats
