= Pinnacle Hills Promenade =

Retail lifestyle center, Rogers, Arkansas, U.S.

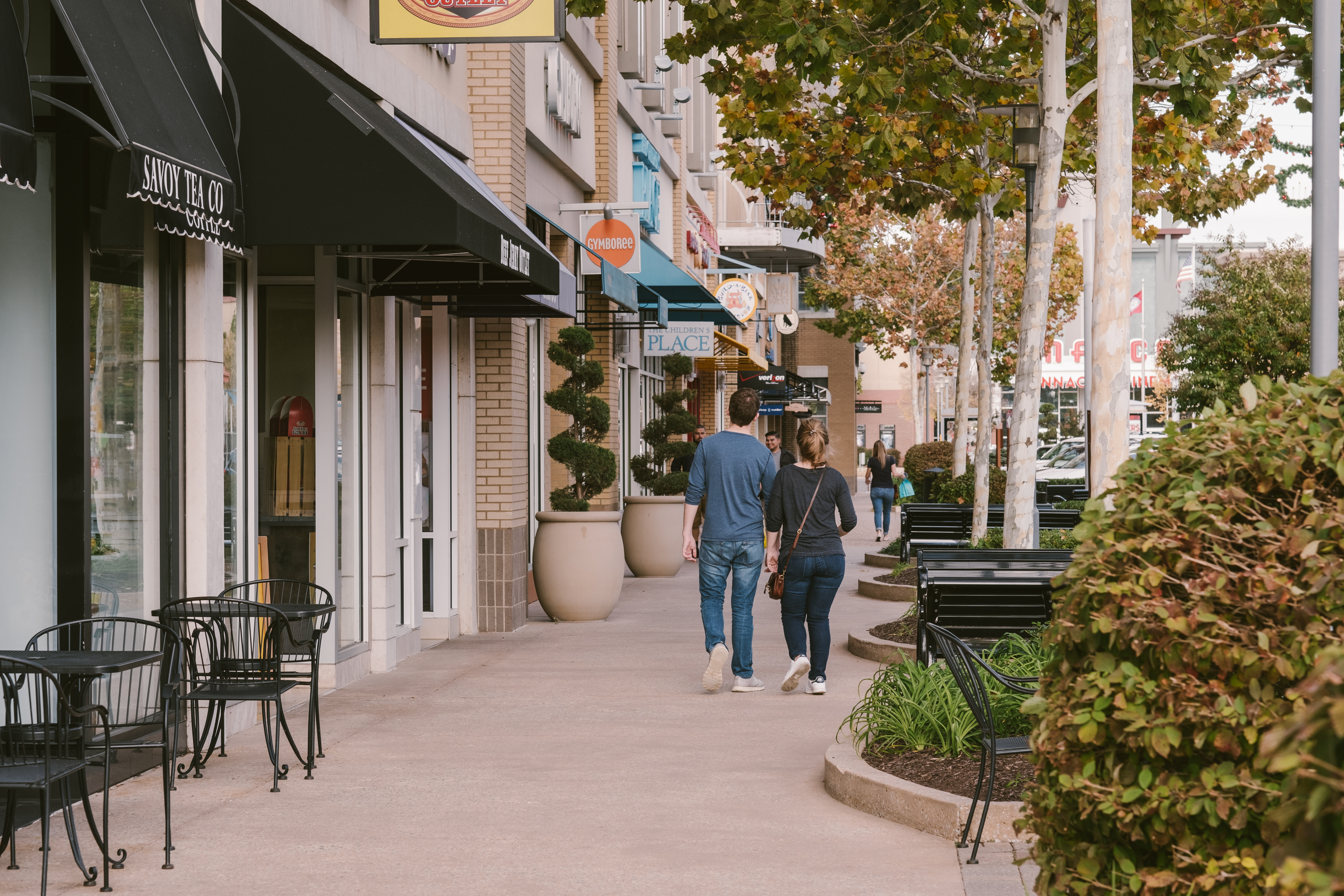
- Location: Rogers, Arkansas, United States
- Coordinates: 36°18′16″N 94°10′31″W
- Address: 2203 Promenade Boulevard
- Opened: October 6, 2006
- Developer: General Growth Properties
- Manager: GGP
- Owner: GGP
- Num. of stores: 99
- Num. of anchor tenants: 6
- Floor area: 933,984 square feet (87,000 m^{2})
- Floors: 1
- Public transit: Ozark Regional Transit

Pinnacle Hills Promenade is a retail lifestyle center in Rogers, Arkansas. Opened in 2006, it features Bass Pro Shops, Dillard's, J. C. Penney, Target, and Best Buy as its anchor stores. It also includes a Malco Theatres movie theater and Dave & Buster's. Adjacent to the mall is a power center, Pinnacle Hills Crossing, which features several big-box stores.

== History ==
The center was first announced in 2003. General Growth Properties developed the center in April 2005 and it opened October 6, 2006. Anchor stores included JCPenney, Dillard's, and Malco Theatres.

The development included an adjacent power center that includes Bed Bath & Beyond, Gordmans, Old Navy, PetSmart, TJ Maxx, Ulta and Kirkland's.

Among the first tenants in the mall was the first Bonefish Grill in Arkansas. Target was later added. Borders Books & Music, another original tenant, closed in 2011. In early 2012, the building became the second Arkansas location of The Fresh Market. That same year, Houlihan's opened its first Arkansas location in a space vacated by Granite City Food & Brewery. Cabela's also opened at the mall in 2012.
