= Wyman, Arkansas =

- Unincorporated community
- Wyman's position in Arkansas. Wyman, Arkansas (the United States)
- Coordinates: 36°4′30″N 94°4′10″W
- Country: United States
- State: Arkansas
- County: Washington
- Township: Wyman
- Elevation: 1,211 ft (369 m)
- Time zone: UTC-6 (Central (CST))
  - Summer (DST): UTC-5 (CDT)
- ZIP code: 72701
- Area code: 479
- GNIS feature ID: 57240

Wyman is an unincorporated community in Wyman Township, Washington County, Arkansas, United States. It is located east of the White River, north of Lake Sequoyah, southwest of Goshen, and east of Fayetteville.
