= DataRank =

American analytics company

- Founded: October 2011
- Founders: Ryan Frazier, Kenny Cason, Britt Cagnina, Chuong Nguyen
- Headquarters: Fayetteville, Arkansas, U.S.
- Services: Product and brand conversation analytics
- Website: datarank.com

DataRank was an American company based in Fayetteville, Arkansas, which specializes in providing businesses with tools for analyzing conversations about their brands and competitors. DataRank was founded in 2011 and graduated from the Y Combinator seed accelerator in 2013.

== Background ==
University of Arkansas graduates Ryan Frazier, Chuong Nguyen, Britt Cagnina, and Kenny Cason launched DataRank, originally known as TTAGG, in October 2011 out of a rental house near the university's campus. After rebranding itself as DataRank in 2013, the company launched its consumer insights blog. In 2013 the company was admitted into Y Combinator.

In 2014 DataRank raised $1.4 million in seed funding from New Road Ventures, FundersClub, and individual business angels.

Notable companies that used DataRank's Consumer Insights Dashboard included Clorox and ConAgra Foods.

DataRank was purchased by SimplyMeasured in 2015. SimplyMeasured was subsequently purchased by Sprout Social.

== How it works ==
DataRank's analytics dashboard allows brand managers to monitor and analyze conversations from a wide variety of sources such as social media, blogs, discussion forums, and e-commerce stores. Additional data sources and internal information can be uploaded directly to DataRank.

Upon registration, the service compiles one year of company data and establishes the company's areas of focus. These might include competitive subject matter as well as the product categories or particular brands to be monitored. The areas of interest are ranked according to several insights including commenter and comment influence, demographic metadata, relevancy, machine-learned patterns, and recency. DataRank then pulls in conversations and comments from across the web, using a proprietary algorithm to sort results according to relevance. Users can navigate the dashboard by scrolling through sorted data or drilling down to view the volume of conversation, demographics, or total reach, with the option to delve into more detailed metrics about the customers who use the products or interact with the brands. The service also allows companies to compare their performance and various product features against those of competitors.

DataRank is different from similar social listening and social analytics services in the way that it organizes the unstructured data and conversations that it brings in. The resulting analytics enable companies to make decisions based on highly relevant information.

=== Visualizations ===
In addition to DataRank's content stream and search options, the dashboard also includes an annotated volume graph of comments, a sentiment graph, and a map of sentiment by state.
