= Dale Bumpers College of Agricultural, Food and Life Sciences =

Sciences school of the University of Arkansas

Dale Bumpers College of Agricultural, Food, and Life Sciences
- Type: Public
- Established: 1905
- Parent institution: University of Arkansas
- Endowment: $15 Million
- Dean: Jean-Francois Meullenet (Interim)
- Students: 2,052 (2012)
- Undergraduates: 1,737 (2012)
- Postgraduates: 315 (2012)
- Location: Fayetteville, Arkansas, U.S.
- Website: bumperscollege.uark.edu

The Dale Bumpers College of Agricultural, Food, and Life Sciences is the University of Arkansas' college for students interested in plants, animals, food, the natural environment and the human environment. It is named for former U.S. Senator and Arkansas governor Dale Bumpers. Bumpers College currently offers 14 majors. The Poultry Science program ranks as one of the three best nationally. Many faculty members have University of Arkansas Division of Agriculture research or extension appointments, which adds significantly to the number of teaching faculty and the resources available for instruction and extracurricular learning opportunities.

== Departments ==
The departments at the college are:

- Agricultural Economics & Agribusiness
- Agricultural Education, Communication & Technology
- Animal Science
- Crop, Soil & Environmental Sciences
- Entomology & Plant Pathology
- Food Science
- Horticulture
- Human Environmental Sciences
- Poultry Science

== Facilities ==
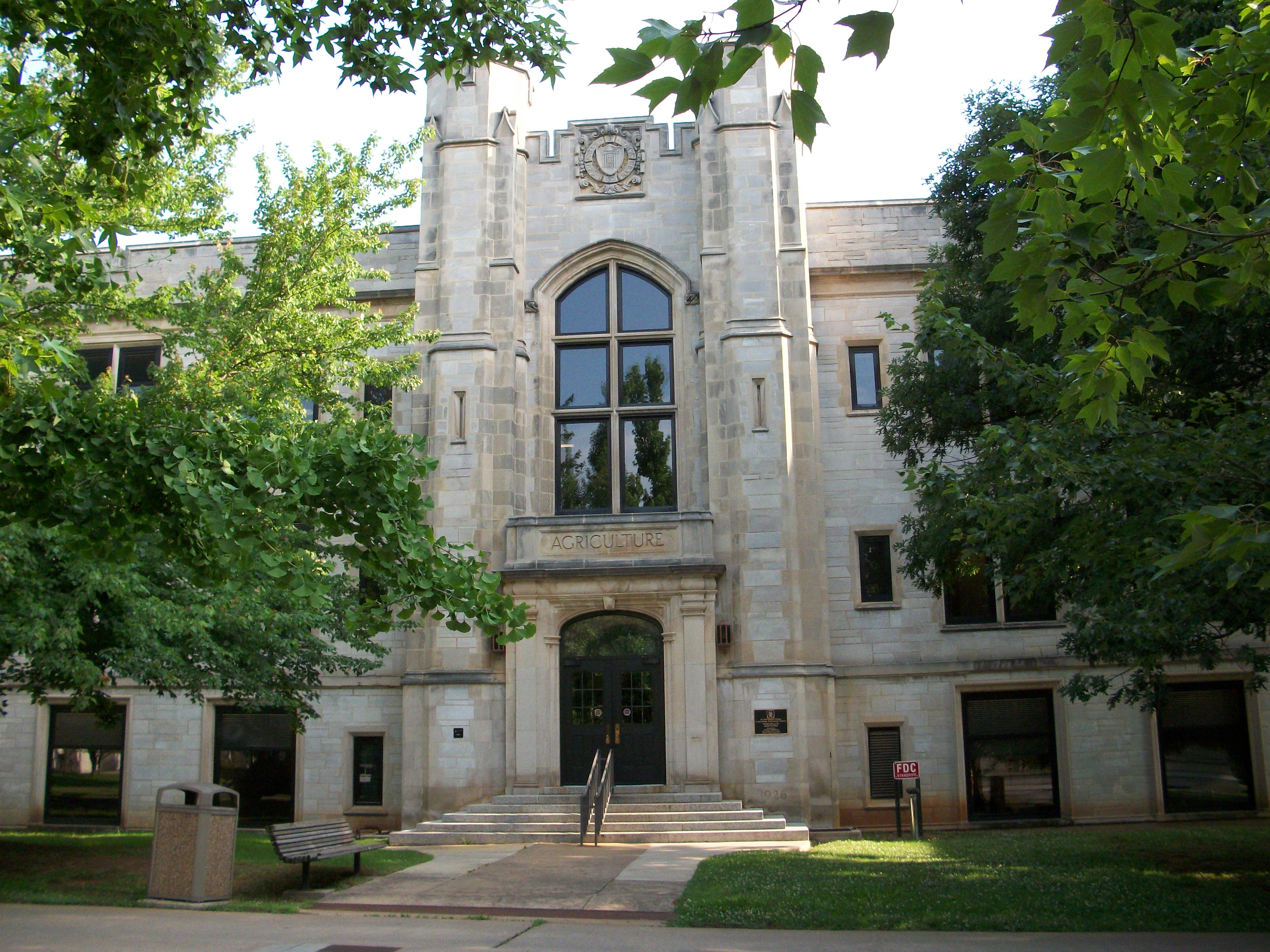
Agriculture Building (1935–Present)

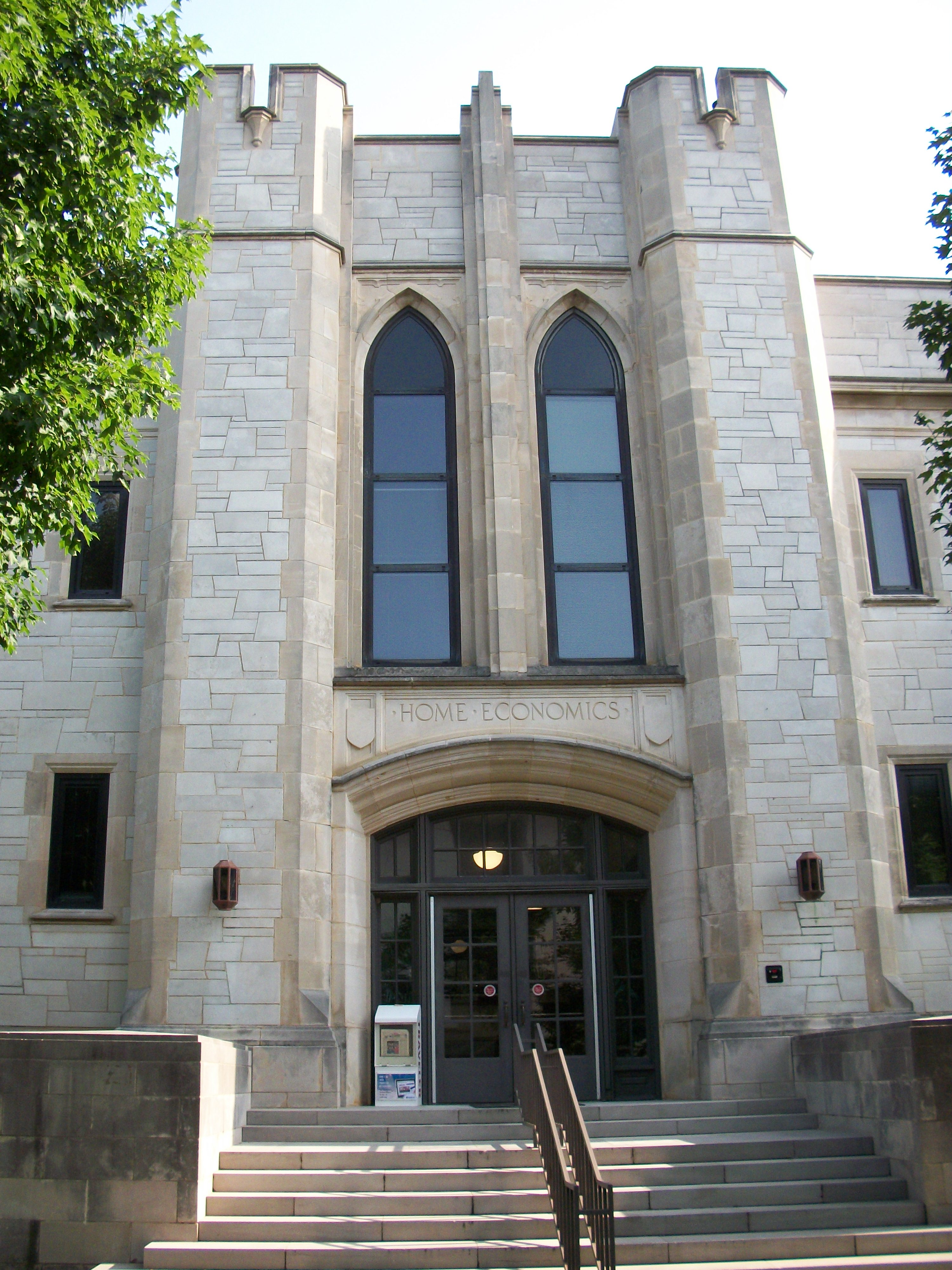
Human Environmental Sciences Building (1935–Present)

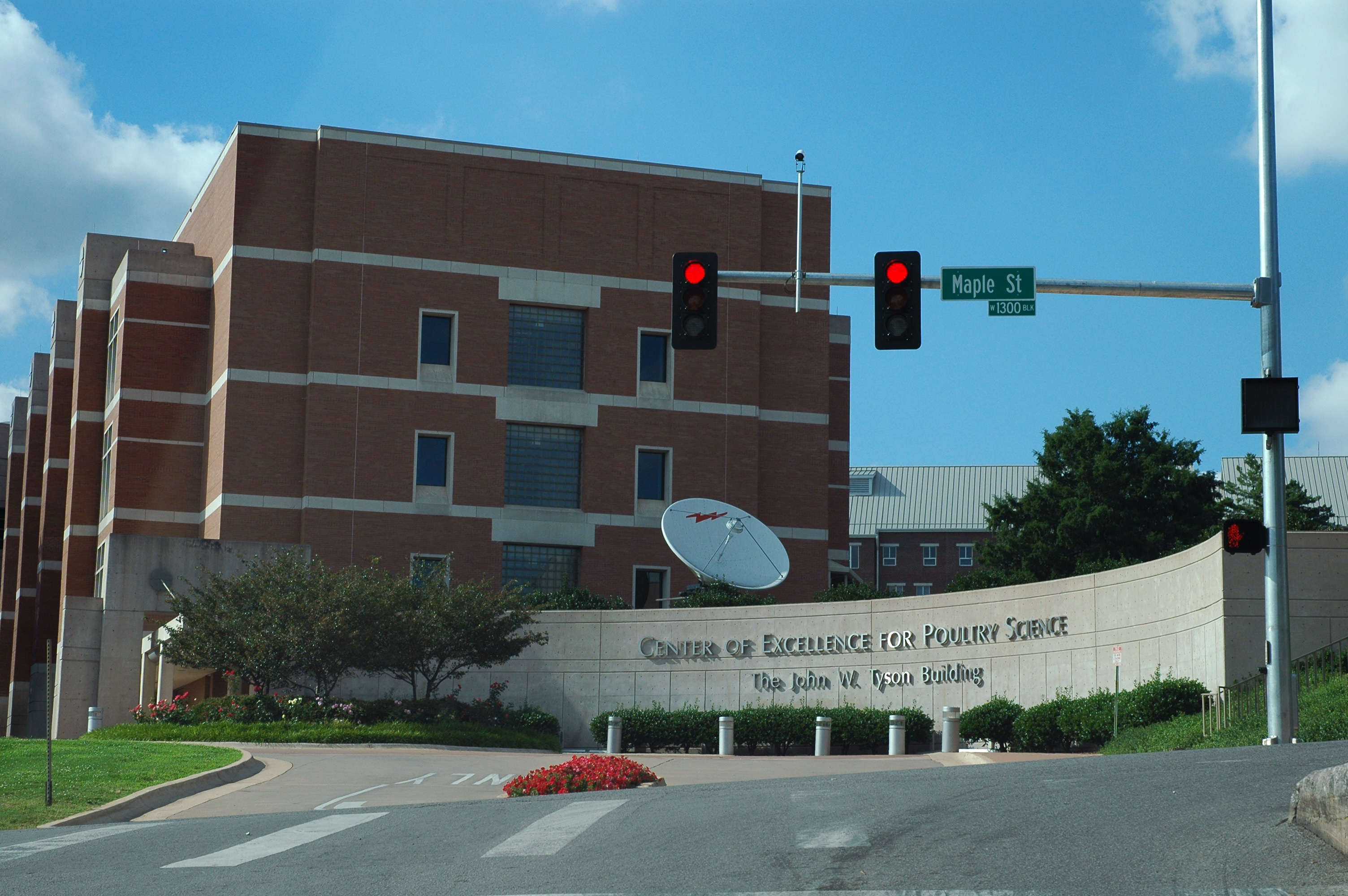
John W. Tyson Center for Poultry Excellence

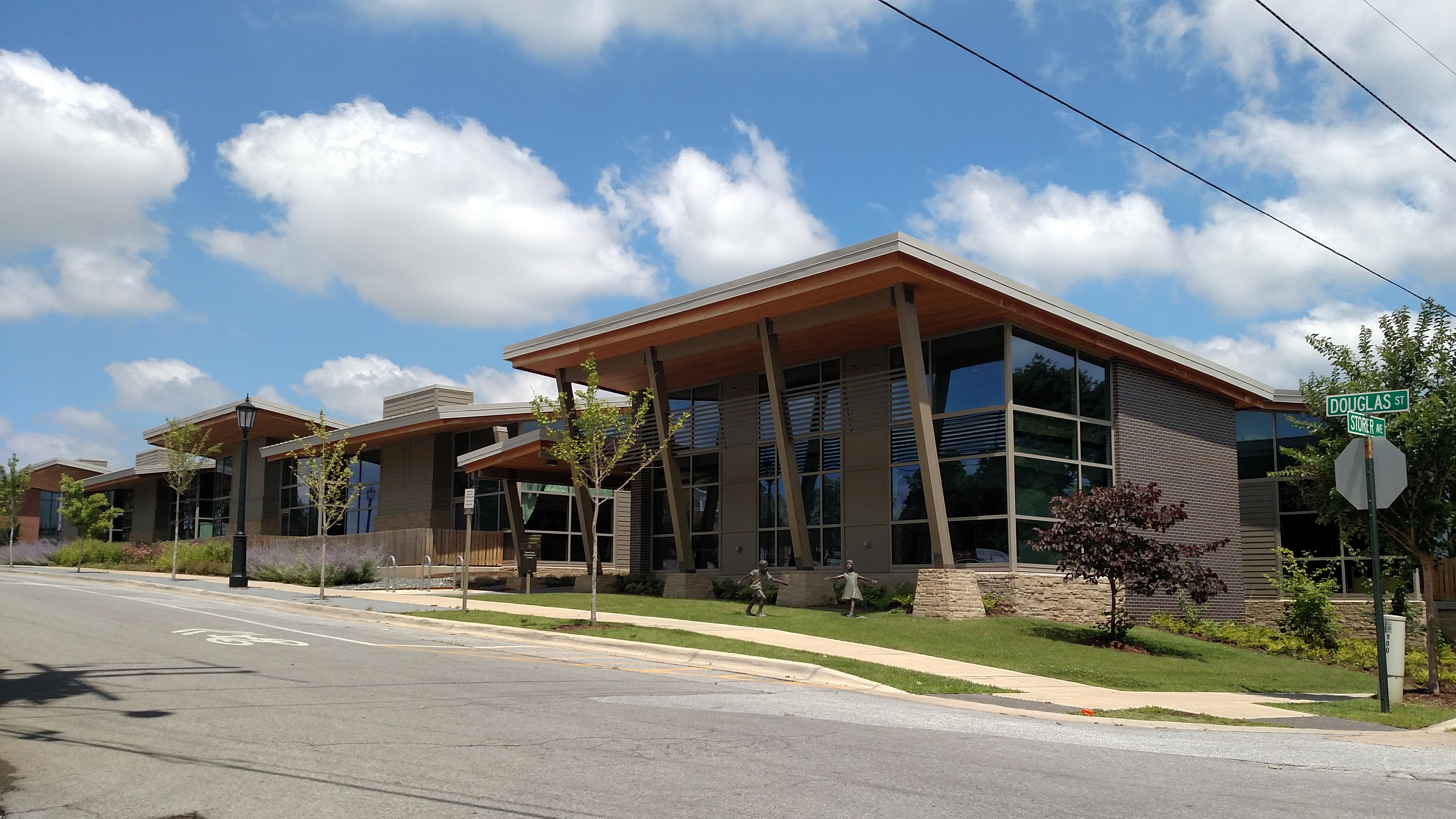
Jean Tyson Child Development Study Center
