= Fayetteville, Arkansas =

City in Arkansas, United States

- City
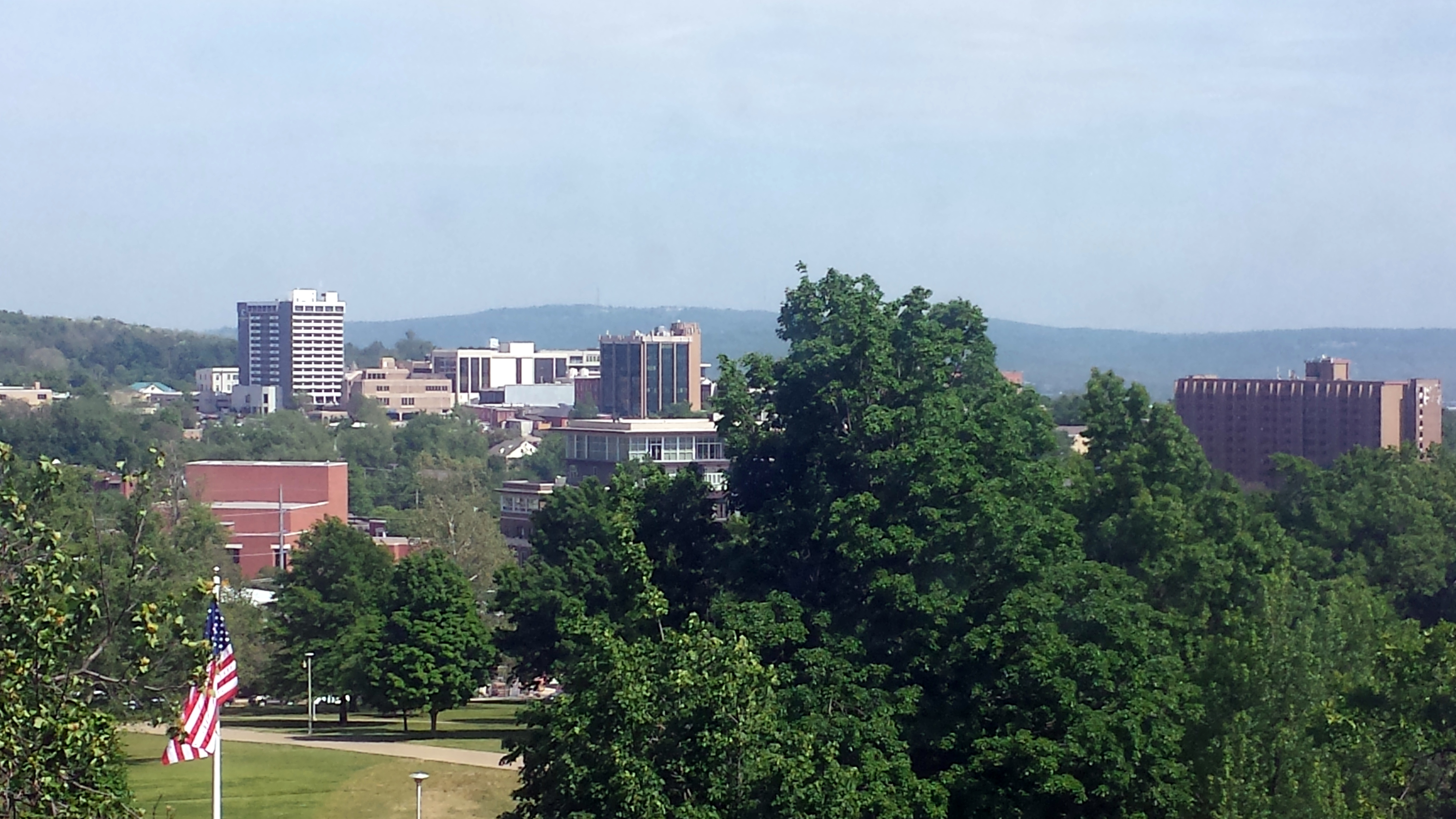
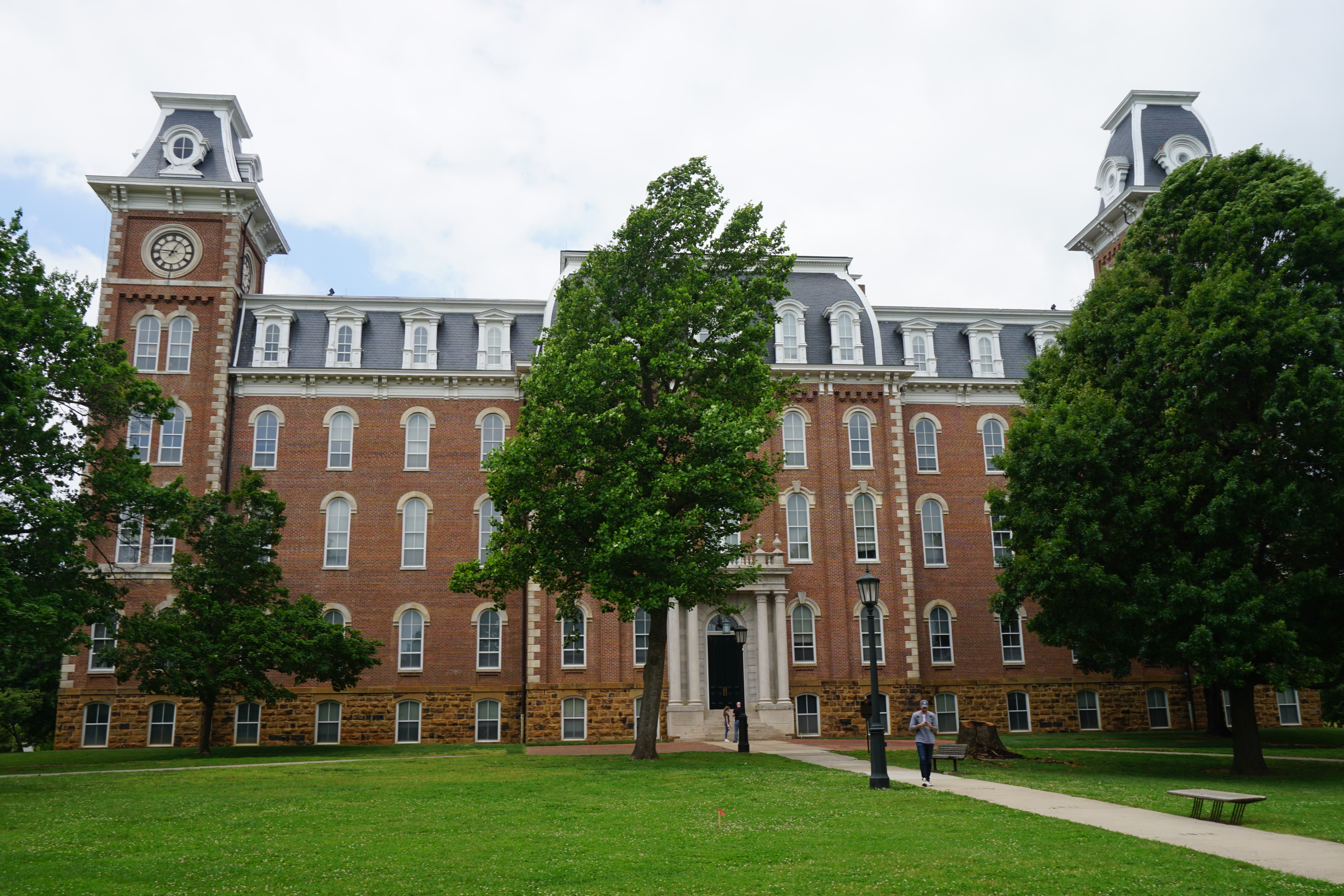
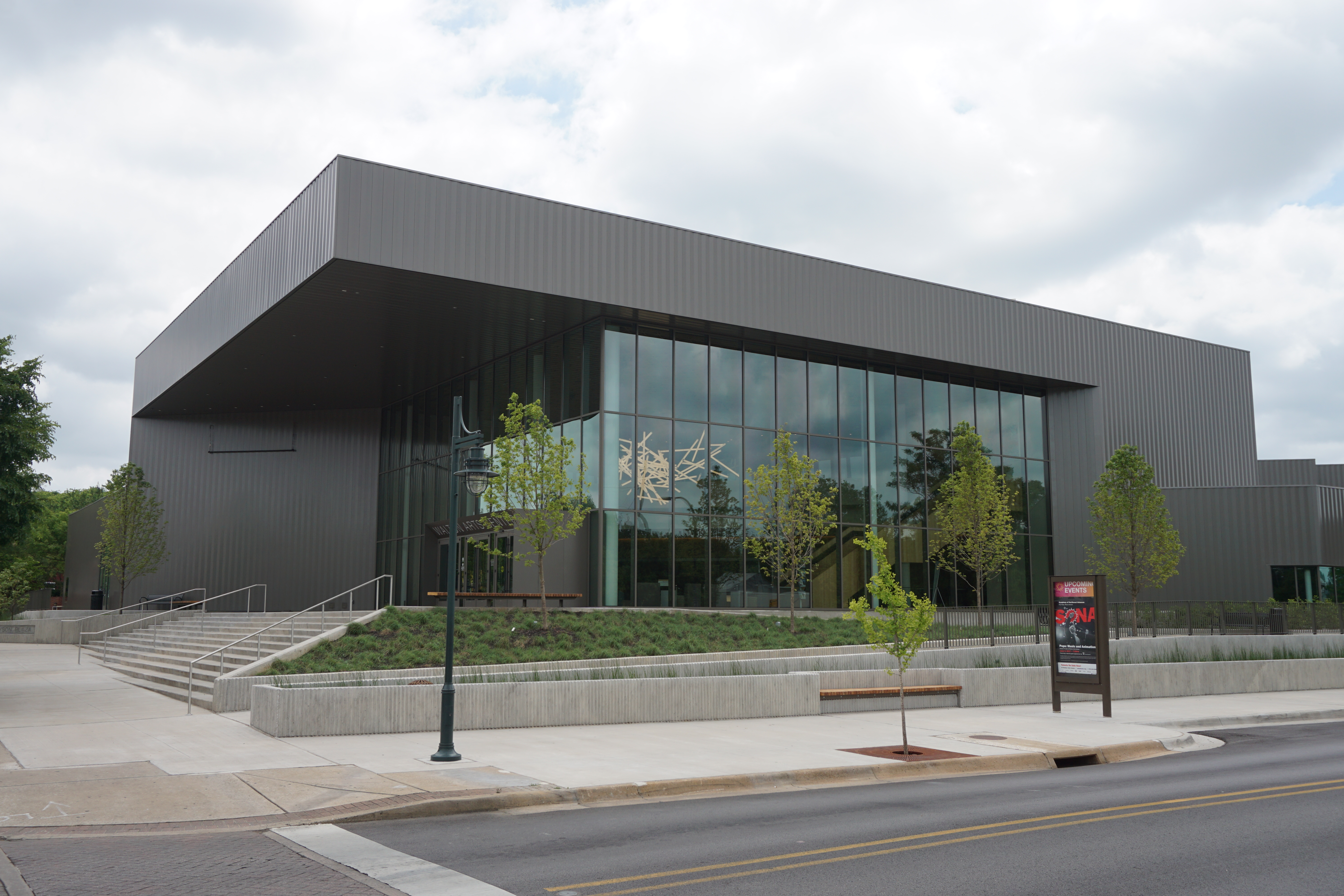
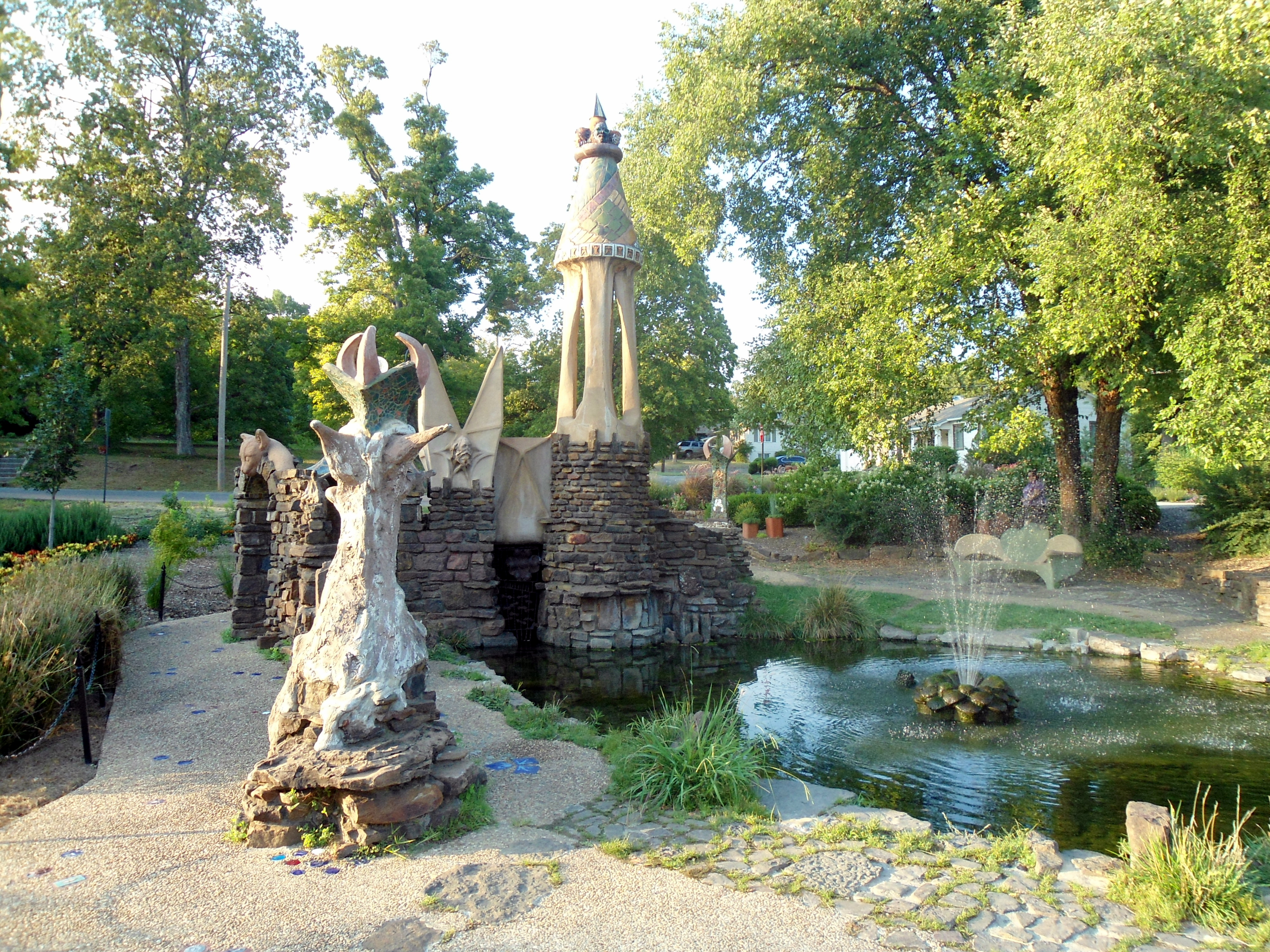
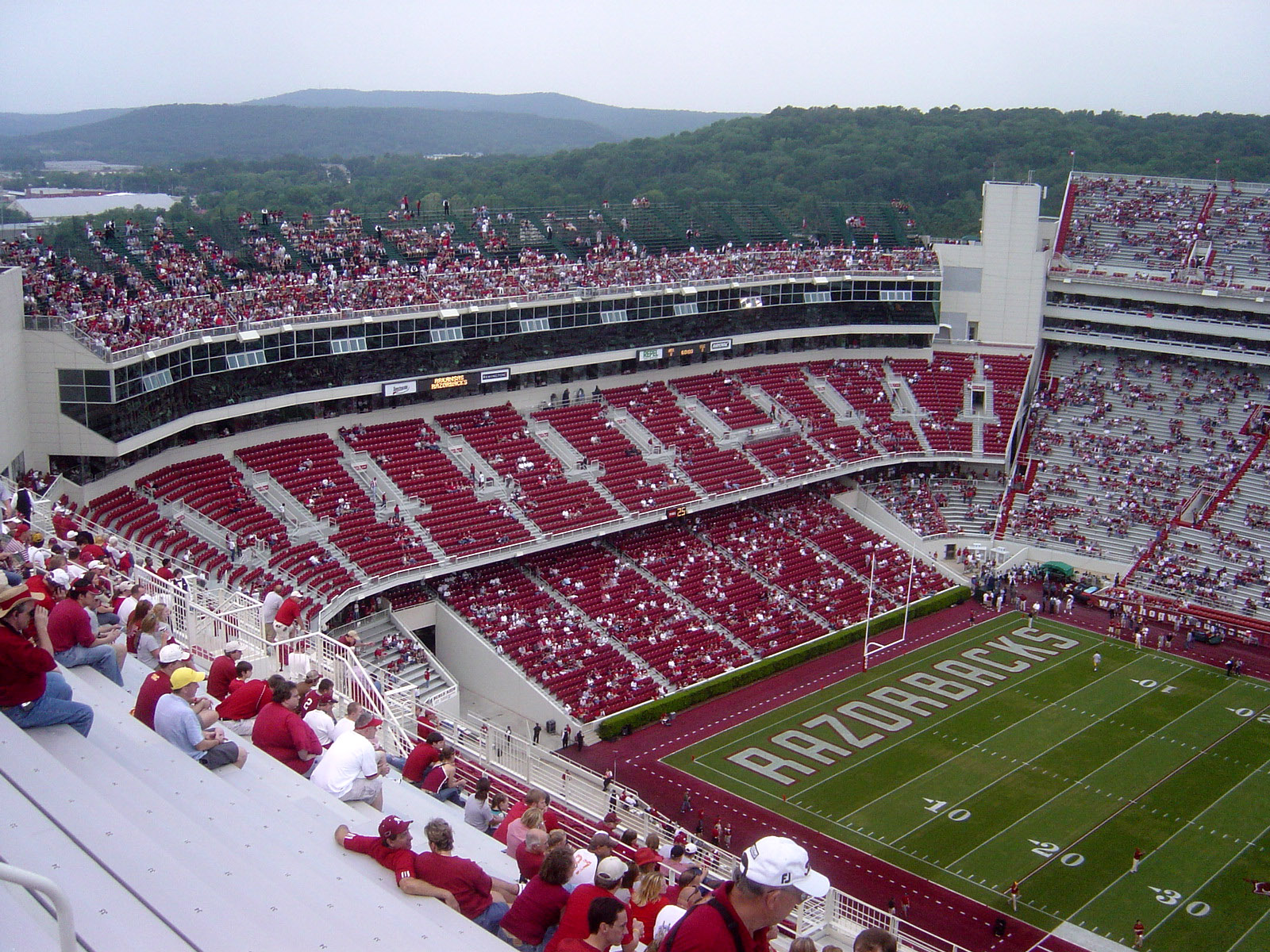
- Downtown Fayetteville University of Arkansas Walton Arts Center Wilson Park Razorback Stadium

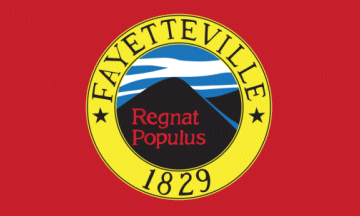
- Flag Seal Logo
- Nicknames: "Track Capital of the World", "The Hill", "Athens of the Ozarks"
- Motto: Regnat Populus (the people rule)
- Interactive map of Fayetteville, Arkansas
- Location within Arkansas Location within the United States
- Coordinates: 36°03′45″N 94°09′27″W
- Country: United States
- State: Arkansas
- County: Washington
- Township: Fayetteville
- Founded: 1828
- Incorporated: 1836
- Rechartered: 1867
- Named for: Fayetteville, Tennessee, Gilbert du Motier, Marquis de Lafayette

Government
  - Type: Mayor–council
  - Council: Members: Robert Stafford; D'Andre Jones; Sarah Moore; Mike Wiederkehr; Scott Berna; Sarah Bunch; Teresa Turk; Monique Jones

Area
  - City: 55.80 sq mi (144.53 km^{2})
  - Land: 54.42 sq mi (140.96 km^{2})
  - Water: 1.38 sq mi (3.57 km^{2})
- Elevation: 1,378 ft (420 m)

Population (2020)
  - City: 93,949
  - Estimate (2025): 106,623 ▲
  - Rank: 2nd in Arkansas
  - Density: 1,726.2/sq mi (666.49/km^{2})
  - Urban: 373,687 (US: 111th)
  - Urban density: 1,885/sq mi (727.7/km^{2})
  - Metro: 622,177 (US: 94th)
- Demonym: Fayettevillian
- Time zone: UTC−6 (Central)
  - Summer (DST): UTC−5 (Central)
- ZIP Codes: 72701–72704
- Area code: 479
- FIPS code: 05-23290
- GNIS feature ID: 2403601
- Major airport: Northwest Arkansas National Airport (XNA)
- Rapid transit: Ozark Regional Transit Razorback Transit
- Website: fayetteville-ar.gov

Fayetteville (/ˈfeɪətvɪl/ FAY-ət-vil) is a city in Washington County, Arkansas, United States, and its county seat. The population was 93,949 at the 2020 census, and was estimated at 106,623 in 2025, making it the second-most populous city in Arkansas and the most populous city in Northwest Arkansas. Fayetteville is on the outskirts of the Boston Mountains, within the Ozarks. It is included in the three-county Northwest Arkansas metropolitan area, with 546,725 residents in 2020.

Named after Fayetteville, Tennessee, from which many settlers had come, Fayetteville, Arkansas, was incorporated on November 3, 1836. It is home to the University of Arkansas, the state's flagship university. When classes are in session, thousands of students on campus change up the pace of the city. Thousands of Arkansas Razorbacks alumni and fans travel to Fayetteville to attend football, basketball, and baseball games.

== History ==
=== Settlement through Antebellum period ===
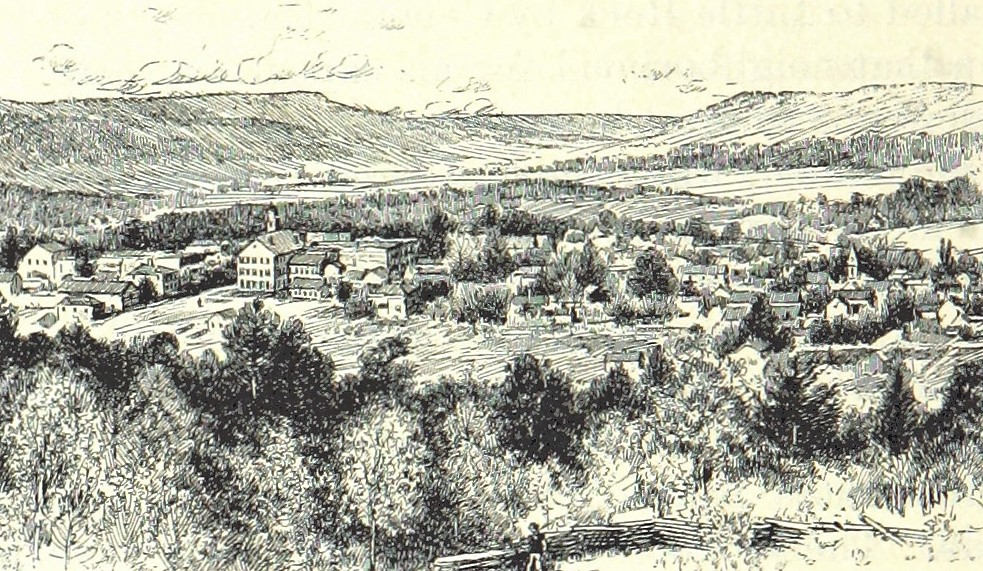
Fayetteville, c. 1887

Following the Louisiana Purchase, the first permanent settlers in what became Fayetteville were George McGarrah and his sons James, John, and William. Around 1828, they settled near Big Spring, close to the modern intersection of Spring and Willow Streets, in an area later known as the Masonic Addition at the base of Mount Sequoyah. That same year, Washington County was created from Lovely County, which had existed for only one year, and the settlement of Washington Courthouse was selected as the county seat. The Washington Courthouse was completed in 1829 and also housed the post office.

Later in 1829, Postmaster General William T. Barry ordered the name changed to Fayetteville to avoid confusion with Washington in Hempstead County. Two commissioners responsible for locating the county seat were from Fayetteville, Tennessee, itself named after Fayetteville, North Carolina, which had been named in honor of General Lafayette for his role in the American Revolutionary War.

James Leeper, a Revolutionary War veteran, was the second settler. His son Matthew Leeper later served as receiver of the federal Land Office, appointed by President Andrew Jackson. The Leeper family owned extensive land holdings south of Mount Sequoyah to the White River. Through marriage, the Leeper and Washington families became closely linked to David Walker, later Chief Justice of the Arkansas Supreme Court, who in 1832 built a double log cabin on what became Center Street.

In 1835, President Jackson issued a patent for 160 acres forming the original settlement. Fayetteville was incorporated as a town on November 3, 1836. P. V. Rhea served as president of the town trustees. That same year, the Fayetteville Female Academy was incorporated, becoming the second school chartered in Arkansas. The town's first newspaper, The Fayetteville Witness, began publication in 1840.

Archibald Yell built an estate known as Waxhaw on the outskirts of town in the early 1830s, naming it after his childhood home region in the Carolinas. Yell later became the second governor of Arkansas and served as a U.S. representative. When Arkansas achieved statehood in 1836, Fayetteville and Washington County continued to develop as a regional political and educational center.

John Nye opened the first store in Fayetteville in a building constructed by James Holmsley. Early hotels included the Burnside House and the Onstott House. In 1856, Austrian immigrant Ferdinand Zellner composed "Fayetteville Polka", the first known piece of sheet music published by an Arkansan. On July 7, 1856, two enslaved men acquitted of murdering enslaver James Boone were lynched by a mob. A historical marker commemorating the event was installed in Oaks Cemetery in 2021.

In 1859, Fayetteville obtained a city charter from the Arkansas legislature. J. W. Walker became the first mayor under this charter. The telegraph reached Fayetteville in 1860, strung along the Military Road from St. Louis, Missouri to Little Rock, Arkansas.

=== Civil War and Reconstruction ===
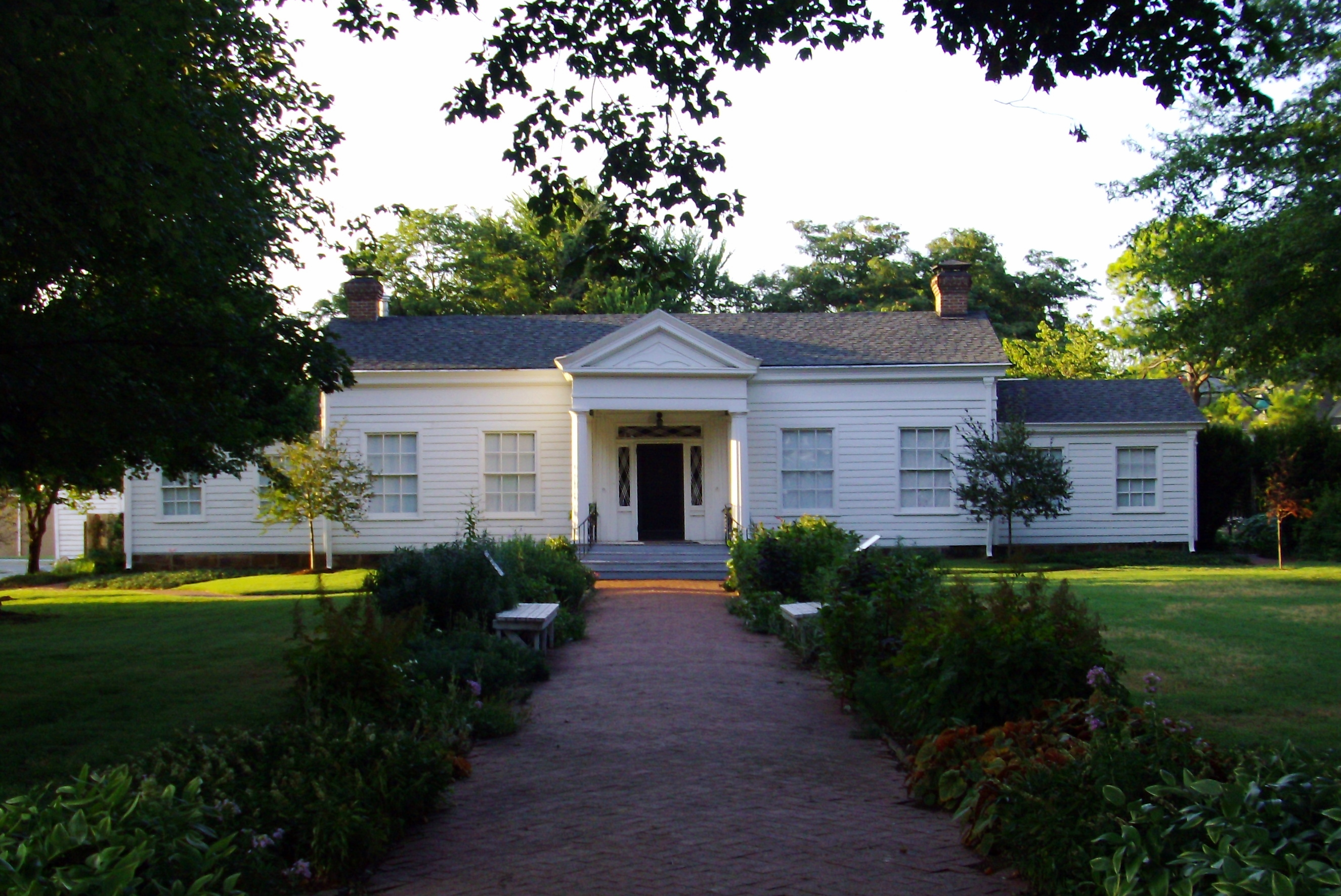
"Colonel Tebbetts place", headquarters of Union forces during the Battle of Fayetteville

On March 5, 1861, Washington County delegates, including three from Fayetteville, attended the Arkansas Secession Convention, electing Judge David Walker as chairman. The convention initially voted against secession on March 16. After the attack on Fort Sumter, the convention reconvened on May 6, 1861, and voted to secede.

Union General Samuel Ryan Curtis occupied Fayetteville on February 18, 1862. Confederate forces retreating south destroyed their arsenal and much of the town to prevent its capture. Fayetteville was subsequently occupied intermittently by both Union and Confederate forces.

The Battle of Pea Ridge occurred northeast of Fayetteville in March 1862. Wounded soldiers from the Battle of Prairie Grove were treated in the town in December 1862. The Action at Fayetteville on April 18, 1863, was the only major engagement in the town itself. Confederate General William L. Cabell attempted to retake Fayetteville from Union forces under Colonel Marcus LaRue Harrison, whose headquarters were located in the former home of Judge Jonas Tebbetts at College Avenue and Dickson Street. The Union forces successfully repelled the attack.

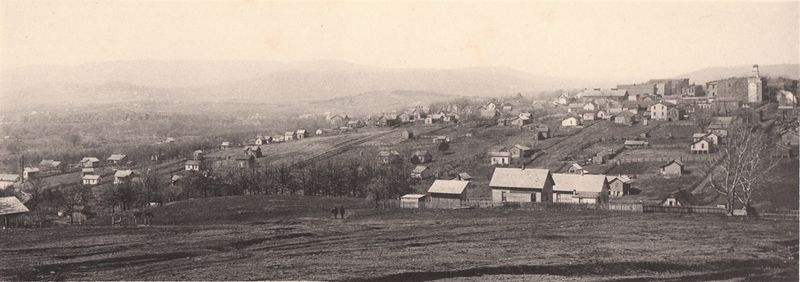
South Fayetteville, c. 1890

During the war, the municipal government was suspended. Fayetteville was occupied for extended periods by Union troops, including the First Arkansas Union Cavalry, composed largely of men from northwest Arkansas. Union forces repelled a Confederate attack in October 1864. After the war, the federal government established the Fayetteville National Cemetery in 1867, followed by the creation of the Fayetteville Confederate Cemetery in 1873.

Local government was restored in 1867, with M. L. Harrison elected mayor. Dissatisfaction with the 1859 charter led to its dissolution, and on August 24, 1870, a new municipal government was established under general state law.

=== Post-Reconstruction through the Gilded Age ===
Newspapers expanded during Reconstruction. The Arkansan was founded in 1859, and the Fayetteville Weekly Democrat began publication in 1868, later becoming the Northwest Arkansas Times. The Fayetteville School District was established on March 20, 1871, as Arkansas's first independent school district.

Banking, illegal in Arkansas from 1846 to 1868 due to earlier financial crises, resumed with the opening of the Stark Bank in 1872. It became the William McIlroy Bank in 1876 and survives as Arvest Bank.

The Morrill Act enabled the founding of Arkansas Industrial University in Fayetteville, which opened on January 22, 1872. In 1899, it was renamed the University of Arkansas. Railroads, including the St. Louis and San Francisco Railway, became central to Fayetteville's economic growth, facilitating the shipment of timber, agricultural products, and manufactured goods.

=== Early Twentieth Century ===
By the early twentieth century, Fayetteville experienced improvements in transportation, communications, and infrastructure. The first telephone exchange opened in 1886. Radio broadcasting began in 1924 from the university under the call sign KFMQ, later KUOA.

Automobiles gradually replaced rail and horse-drawn transport. Street paving began in 1917. Fayetteville contributed personnel to the Spanish-American War, the Mexican border conflict, and World War I. During the war, the University of Arkansas served as a training site for military units.

=== World War II and post-war ===
A permanent airport was established in 1929 and used for pilot training during World War II. Poultry production became the dominant agricultural industry by the mid-twentieth century. Fayetteville emerged as a regional cultural center, aided by university growth and venues such as the Rockwood Club.

In 1954, following Brown v. Board of Education, Fayetteville became one of the first cities in the South to integrate its public schools, shortly after Charleston, Arkansas.

=== Modern Era ===
From the late twentieth century onward, Fayetteville diversified its economy through industrial development, finance, education, and services. In 1990, a new Washington County Courthouse was completed. The city continued to expand educational and civic institutions while maintaining its role as a cultural and economic hub of northwest Arkansas.

In 2014, the Fayetteville City Council adopted a civil rights ordinance addressing discrimination based on sexual orientation. The ordinance was repealed by voters later that year. A revised ordinance with broader religious exemptions was approved by voters on September 8, 2015.

== Geography ==
...yet I venture the assertion that nowhere in said country—or for that matter, in any part of the state—could be found a lovelier elevation, or a lovelier grove of graceful oaks, or a more commanding view, or, in fine, a spot better suited and adapted for the purposes designated than the one chosen for said University [of Arkansas] site and farm.

— Noah Putnam Gates, first president of the University of Arkansas

=== Topography ===
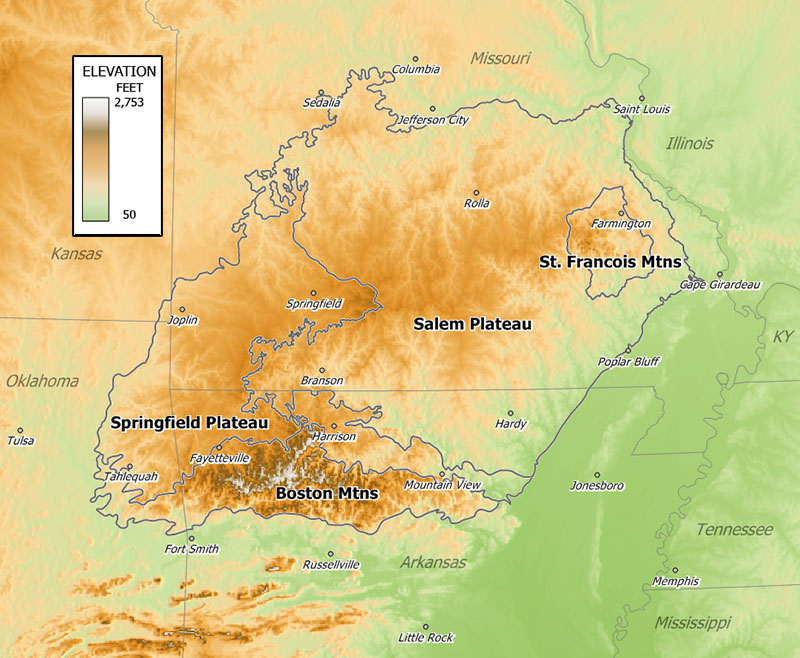
The split between the Springfield Plateau and the Boston Mountains is in the center of Washington County, Arkansas, close to Fayetteville. The Boston Mountains is the rough, mountainous terrain south of Fayetteville and the more habitable Springfield Plateau contains the cities of Springdale, Bentonville, and Rogers to the north of Fayetteville.

Fayetteville is in the Boston Mountains, a subset of the Ozarks which runs through Northwest Arkansas, southern Missouri, and Eastern Oklahoma. The rocks of the Boston Mountains were formed when sandstones and shales were deposited on top of the Springfield Plateau during the Pennsylvanian Period. In the Fayetteville area, following uplift during the Ouachita orogeny, the sediments were eroded to expose the Mississippian limestone formations of the Springfield Plateau, while south of Fayetteville the remaining deeply eroded Pennsylvanian sediments form the steep Boston Mountains.

Fayetteville is also the namesake of the Fayetteville Shale, a geological formation which has recently become an epicenter for natural gas extraction by hydraulic fracturing.

=== Metropolitan area ===
According to the United States Census Bureau, the city has a total area of 55.2 square miles (143 km^{2}), of which 53.8 square miles (139 km^{2}) is land and 1.4 square miles (3.6 km^{2}) (2.59%) is water. The city is centrally located in Washington County, Arkansas, along Interstate 49/US Route 71, the only fully controlled access route through the area, which replaced the winding US 71 (now US 71B) in the 1990s. An interstate connection with Fort Smith to the south and Kansas City, Missouri, to the north has contributed to Fayetteville's growth. Fayetteville is bordered along the north by Springdale and Johnson. In places, this transition is seamlessly urban. Fayetteville is not bordered by towns to its south, instead opening up to scenic country along the Boston Mountains Scenic Loop. Past the rural communities of Greenland and West Fork is Devil's Den State Park. To the west is Farmington along US Route 62 and to the east of Fayetteville is undeveloped land in rural Washington County.

The Fayetteville–Springdale–Rogers Metropolitan Area consists of three Arkansas counties: Benton, Madison, and Washington. The area had a population of 463,205 at the 2010 census which increased to 546,725 by the 2020 census (an increase of 24.2 percent). Although the Metropolitan Statistical Area does not consist of the usual principal-city-with-suburbs geography, Fayetteville's adjacent communities include Elkins, Farmington, Greenland, Habberton, Johnson, and Wyman.

=== Districts ===
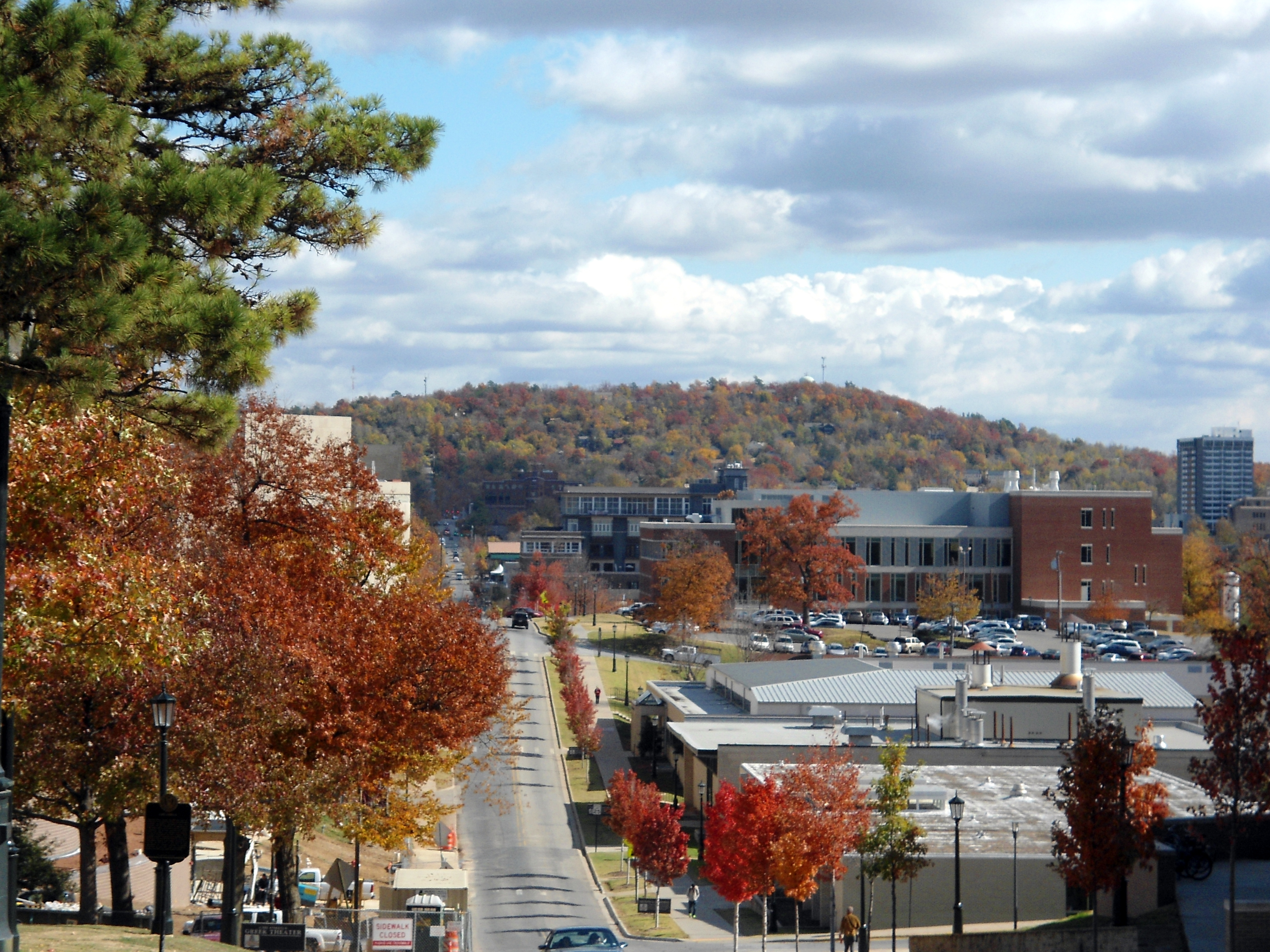
Mount Sequoyah rises above Fayetteville on the city's eastern side.

Fayetteville is entirely contained within Fayetteville Township, as the township and city have identical boundaries. Although Arkansas generally does not use its civil townships for any governmental purpose, they are used for voting boundaries in some places.

Generally the part of Fayetteville west of I-49/US 71 is called west Fayetteville. Another prominent district is Uptown Fayetteville, which encompasses the scores of business and new homes near the Northwest Arkansas Mall in north Fayetteville. The University of Arkansas defines its own part of Fayetteville, with dozens of student apartments and restaurants located near campus. The university's impact is also apparent along College Avenue, which contains hundreds of shops and restaurants. Northeast of campus are the Wilson Park Historic District and the Mount Nord Historic District. The Fayetteville Historic Square is the original city center of Fayetteville, and Dickson Street is the best-known entertainment district in Arkansas.

The part of the city east of US 71B is known as east Fayetteville. Homes atop Mount Sequoyah in this part of the city encircle Mount Sequoyah Retreat and Conference Center. Also on the east side are old structures along the former Butterfield Overland Mail route, a stagecoach route to San Francisco known as Old Wire Road. South Fayetteville is commonly known as the area south of Martin Luther King Jr. Boulevard. Fifteenth Street forms the southernmost residential district of Fayetteville, with the Fayetteville Industrial Park to its east.

==== Annexed communities ====
Fayetteville has annexed six unincorporated communities within its corporate limits. Four of them are still listed as "populated places" by the USGS Board on Geographic Names. The other two are listed as "historical populated places." Annexations since 1870 are displayed on Fayetteville's website in the interactive maps section. Fayetteville's second annexations took place in 1946 when it incorporated Fayette Junction and McNair into the city. Baldwin was added the next year, with Barbara and Ruckers Grove being annexed in 1967. Fayetteville's most recent annexation occurred in 1982 when White Rock was added to the city limits.

=== Climate ===
Fayetteville has a humid subtropical climate (Köppen Cfa). The city experiences all four seasons and receives cold air masses from the north; however, some of the Arctic masses are blocked by the higher elevations of the Ozarks. July is the hottest month of the year, with an average high of 88.7 °F (31.5 °C) and an average low of 69.4 °F (20.8 °C). Temperatures above 100 °F (38 °C) are rare but do occur, on average, 3 times a year. January is the coldest month with an average high of 46.5 °F (8.1 °C) and an average low of 26.9 °F (−2.8 °C). Highs below 32 °F (0 °C) occur on average 10.4 times a year, with 0.6 nights per year dropping below 0 °F (−18 °C). The city's highest temperature was 111 °F (43.9 °C), recorded on July 14, 1954. The lowest temperature recorded was −24 °F (−31 °C), on February 12, 1899.

Precipitation is weakly seasonal, with a bimodal pattern: wet seasons in the spring and fall, and relatively drier summers and winters, but some rain in all months. The spring wet season is more pronounced than fall, with the highest rainfall in May. That differs slightly from the climate in central Arkansas, where the fall wet season is more comparable to spring.

Climate data for Fayetteville, Arkansas (Drake Field), 1991–2020 normals, extremes 1949–present
Month	Jan	Feb	Mar	Apr	May	Jun	Jul	Aug	Sep	Oct	Nov	Dec	Year
Record high °F (°C)	77 (25)	87 (31)	94 (34)	93 (34)	93 (34)	101 (38)	110 (43)	110 (43)	103 (39)	96 (36)	83 (28)	81 (27)	110 (43)
Mean maximum °F (°C)	68.1 (20.1)	72.4 (22.4)	79.3 (26.3)	83.4 (28.6)	87.2 (30.7)	91.4 (33.0)	96.9 (36.1)	97.4 (36.3)	92.2 (33.4)	84.7 (29.3)	75.4 (24.1)	68.5 (20.3)	98.6 (37.0)
Mean daily maximum °F (°C)	47.7 (8.7)	52.2 (11.2)	60.7 (15.9)	69.7 (20.9)	76.7 (24.8)	84.6 (29.2)	89.2 (31.8)	89.0 (31.7)	81.5 (27.5)	70.9 (21.6)	59.4 (15.2)	49.8 (9.9)	69.3 (20.7)
Daily mean °F (°C)	36.4 (2.4)	40.4 (4.7)	48.4 (9.1)	57.1 (13.9)	65.3 (18.5)	73.6 (23.1)	77.9 (25.5)	76.9 (24.9)	69.0 (20.6)	58.0 (14.4)	47.3 (8.5)	38.8 (3.8)	57.4 (14.1)
Mean daily minimum °F (°C)	25.1 (−3.8)	28.5 (−1.9)	36.1 (2.3)	44.5 (6.9)	54.0 (12.2)	62.6 (17.0)	66.5 (19.2)	64.9 (18.3)	56.5 (13.6)	45.2 (7.3)	35.3 (1.8)	27.8 (−2.3)	45.6 (7.6)
Mean minimum °F (°C)	7.3 (−13.7)	10.9 (−11.7)	17.9 (−7.8)	27.6 (−2.4)	38.1 (3.4)	51.7 (10.9)	57.4 (14.1)	54.4 (12.4)	41.9 (5.5)	28.6 (−1.9)	18.8 (−7.3)	11.6 (−11.3)	3.2 (−16.0)
Record low °F (°C)	−15 (−26)	−20 (−29)	0 (−18)	17 (−8)	29 (−2)	41 (5)	45 (7)	45 (7)	31 (−1)	17 (−8)	4 (−16)	−14 (−26)	−20 (−29)
Average precipitation inches (mm)	2.75 (70)	2.56 (65)	3.98 (101)	5.01 (127)	5.89 (150)	4.31 (109)	3.80 (97)	3.17 (81)	4.26 (108)	4.48 (114)	3.68 (93)	3.07 (78)	46.96 (1,193)
Average snowfall inches (cm)	1.5 (3.8)	2.4 (6.1)	1.3 (3.3)	0.0 (0.0)	0.0 (0.0)	0.0 (0.0)	0.0 (0.0)	0.0 (0.0)	0.0 (0.0)	0.0 (0.0)	0.2 (0.51)	1.1 (2.8)	6.5 (17)
Average precipitation days (≥ 0.01 in)	8.3	7.7	11.1	10.3	12.8	10.4	8.8	8.4	9.1	9.8	8.6	8.0	113.3
Average snowy days (≥ 0.1 in)	0.9	0.9	0.5	0.0	0.0	0.0	0.0	0.0	0.0	0.0	0.3	0.7	3.3
Source: NOAA

Climate data for Fayetteville Experimental Station, Arkansas (1991–2020 normals, extremes 1892–present)
Month	Jan	Feb	Mar	Apr	May	Jun	Jul	Aug	Sep	Oct	Nov	Dec	Year
Record high °F (°C)	76 (24)	86 (30)	96 (36)	96 (36)	95 (35)	104 (40)	111 (44)	109 (43)	105 (41)	96 (36)	90 (32)	78 (26)	111 (44)
Mean daily maximum °F (°C)	46.5 (8.1)	51.2 (10.7)	59.1 (15.1)	69.0 (20.6)	75.9 (24.4)	84.1 (28.9)	88.7 (31.5)	86.6 (30.3)	81.4 (27.4)	70.9 (21.6)	58.6 (14.8)	49.6 (9.8)	68.6 (20.3)
Daily mean °F (°C)	36.7 (2.6)	40.6 (4.8)	48.5 (9.2)	58.1 (14.5)	66.0 (18.9)	74.8 (23.8)	79.1 (26.2)	78.1 (25.6)	70.6 (21.4)	59.4 (15.2)	48.1 (8.9)	39.7 (4.3)	58.3 (14.6)
Mean daily minimum °F (°C)	26.9 (−2.8)	30.0 (−1.1)	37.9 (3.3)	47.2 (8.4)	56.2 (13.4)	65.5 (18.6)	69.4 (20.8)	67.7 (19.8)	59.8 (15.4)	47.9 (8.8)	37.7 (3.2)	29.8 (−1.2)	48.0 (8.9)
Record low °F (°C)	−23 (−31)	−24 (−31)	−11 (−24)	18 (−8)	28 (−2)	39 (4)	48 (9)	44 (7)	29 (−2)	17 (−8)	5 (−15)	−12 (−24)	−24 (−31)
Average precipitation inches (mm)	2.57 (65)	2.31 (59)	3.74 (95)	4.51 (115)	6.01 (153)	4.68 (119)	3.59 (91)	3.44 (87)	4.53 (115)	4.05 (103)	3.99 (101)	2.86 (73)	46.28 (1,176)
Average precipitation days (≥ 0.01 in)	6.3	6.9	7.3	8.6	11.1	8.4	7.2	7.1	7.1	7.6	6.7	6.2	90.5
Source: NOAA

== Demographics ==
Historical population
Census	Pop.	Note	%±
1840	425		—
1850	598		40.7%
1860	972		62.5%
1870	955		−1.7%
1880	1,788		87.2%
1890	2,942		64.5%
1900	4,061		38.0%
1910	4,471		10.1%
1920	5,362		19.9%
1930	7,394		37.9%
1940	8,212		11.1%
1950	17,071		107.9%
1960	20,274		18.8%
1970	30,729		51.6%
1980	36,608		19.1%
1990	42,099		15.0%
2000	58,047		37.9%
2010	73,580		26.8%
2020	93,949		27.7%
2025 (est.)	106,623	▲	13.5%
U.S. Decennial Census

Fayetteville is the second most populated city in Arkansas.

=== Racial and ethnic composition ===
Historical Racial composition	2010	2000	1990	1980	1970
White	83.8%	86.5%	93.92%	93.13%	97.46%
—Non-Hispanic	80.7%	84.1%	93.19%	92.24%	— (Note: The 1970 U.S. Census did not record Hispanic American or Asian American. The race selections on the census were truncated, so other race would be the default.)
Black or African American	6.0%	5.1%	3.18%	3.75% (Note: The 1980 U.S. Census referred to the "Black or African American" as a truncated "Black".)	1.94%
Hispanic or Latino (of any race)	6.42%	4.9%	1.10%	1.46%	—
Asian	3.08%	3.1%	1.50%	1.56%	—
Other race or multiracial	5.86%	4.38%	0.34%	0.42%	0.61%

Fayetteville city, Arkansas – Racial and ethnic composition Note: the US Census treats Hispanic/Latino as an ethnic category. This table excludes Latinos from the racial categories and assigns them to a separate category. Hispanics/Latinos may be of any race.
Race / Ethnicity (NH = Non-Hispanic)	Pop 2000	Pop 2010	Pop 2020	% 2000	% 2010	% 2020
White alone (NH)	48,769	59,398	69,228	84.02%	80.73%	73.69%
Black or African American alone (NH)	2,930	4,301	5,956	5.05%	5.85%	6.34%
Native American or Alaska Native alone (NH)	685	734	872	1.18%	1.00%	0.93%
Asian alone (NH)	1,473	2,255	2,987	2.54%	3.06%	3.18%
Native Hawaiian or Pacific Islander alone (NH)	88	155	469	0.15%	0.21%	0.50%
Other race alone (NH)	59	90	348	0.10%	0.12%	0.37%
Mixed race or Multiracial (NH)	1,222	1,922	6,007	2.11%	2.61%	6.39%
Hispanic or Latino (any race)	2,821	4,725	8,082	4.86%	6.42%	8.60%
Total	58,047	73,580	93,949	100.00%	100.00%	100.00%

=== 2020 census ===
As of the 2020 census, there were 93,949 people, 39,374 households, and 16,703 families residing in the city.

The median age was 27.9 years. 17.7% of residents were under the age of 18 and 10.3% of residents were 65 years of age or older. For every 100 females there were 97.8 males, and for every 100 females age 18 and over there were 96.0 males age 18 and over.

97.7% of residents lived in urban areas, while 2.3% lived in rural areas.

There were 39,374 households in Fayetteville, of which 23.2% had children under the age of 18 living in them. Of all households, 32.3% were married-couple households, 27.3% were households with a male householder and no spouse or partner present, and 31.7% were households with a female householder and no spouse or partner present. About 36.2% of all households were made up of individuals and 7.5% had someone living alone who was 65 years of age or older.

There were 43,795 housing units, of which 10.1% were vacant. The homeowner vacancy rate was 1.8% and the rental vacancy rate was 8.7%.

=== 2010 census ===
In the 2010 census, Fayetteville had a population of 73,580 and grew by 26.8 percent from the year 2000.

As of the census of 2010, there were 73,580 people, 33,661 households, and 14,574 families residing in the city. The population density was 1,333.0 inhabitants per square mile (514.7/km^{2}). There were 38,281 housing units at an average density of 693.5 per square mile (267.8/km^{2}). The racial makeup of the city was 89.8% White, 6.0% Black or African American, 0.8% Native American, 1.1% Asian, 0.2% Pacific Islander, 2.8% from other races, and 3.1% from two or more races. 6.4% of the population were Hispanic or Latino of any race.

Fayetteville was the third best educated city in Arkansas (after Maumelle) in the 2010 Census, proportionately, with 40.5% of adults age 25 or older holding an associate degree or higher, and 24.6% of adults possessing a bachelor's degree or higher. There were 33,661 households, out of which 19.9% had children under the age of 18 living with them, 31.4% were married couples living together, 7.1% had a female householder with no spouse present, and 58.7% were non-families. 45.2% of all households were made up of individuals, and 7.1% had someone living alone who was 65 years of age or older. The average household size was 2.04 and the average family size was 3.02.

In the city, the population was spread out, with 16.9% under the age of 18, 23.6% from 18 to 24, 31.5% from 25 to 44, 19.3% from 45 to 64, and 8.4% who were 65 years of age or older. The median age was 27.8 years. For every 100 females, there were 100.9 males. The median income for a household in the city was $31,393, and the median income for a family was $62,258. Males had a median income of $42,004 versus $29,373 for females, indicating a huge income disparity. The per capita income for the city was $26,267. 43.7% of the population and 29.9% of families were below the poverty line. Out of the total population, 19.0% of those under the age of 18 and 17.3% of those 65 and older were living below the poverty line.

69.6% of Fayetteville's population describes themselves as religious, above the national average of 48.34%. 50.8% of people in Fayetteville who describe themselves as having a religion are Baptist (37.22% of the city's total population). 15.5% of people holding a religion are Catholic (7.7% of the city's total population). There are also higher proportions of Methodists and Pentecostals above the national average.

== Economy ==
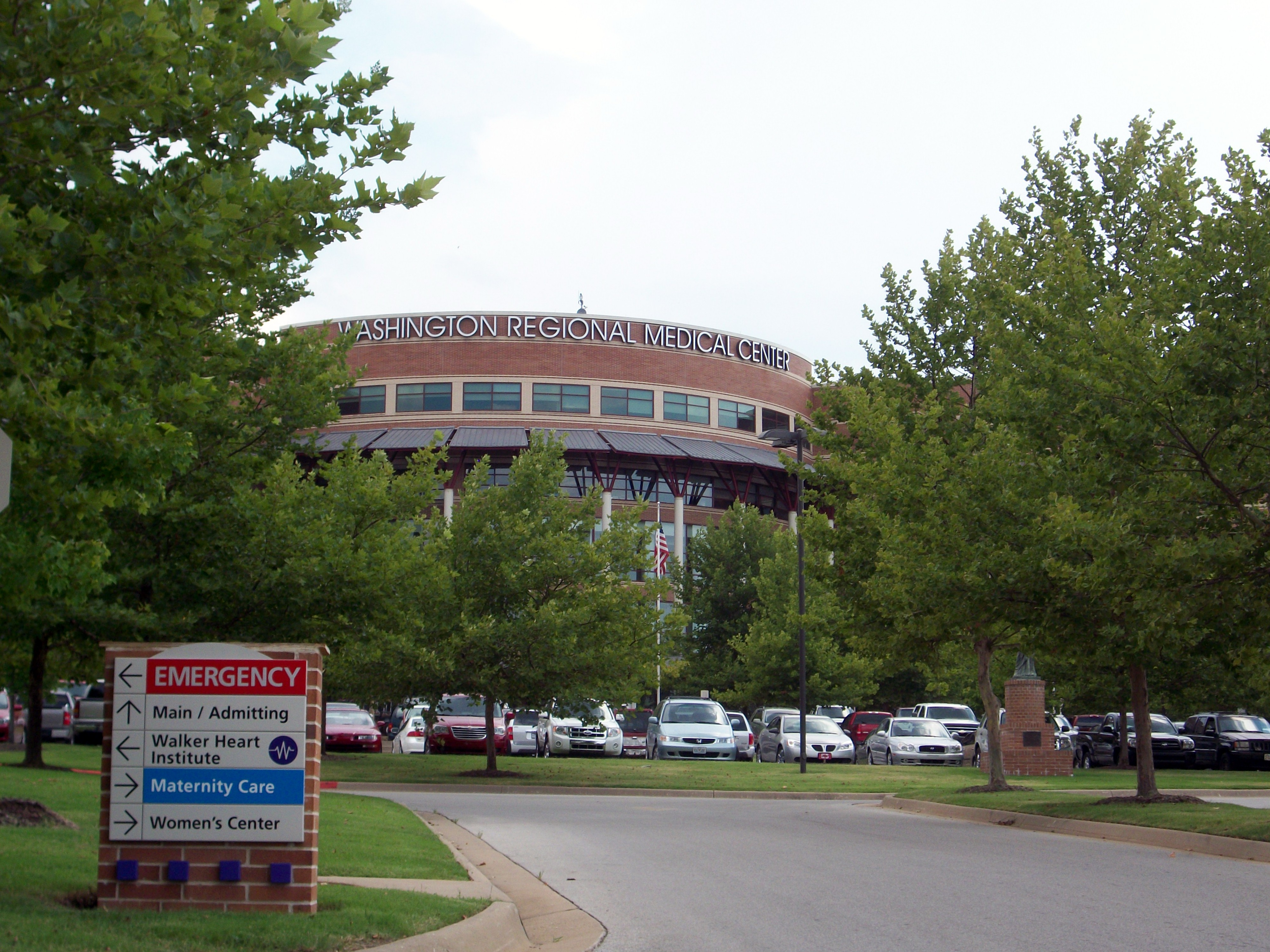
Washington Regional Medical Center is in Uptown Fayetteville.

Top employers
2020 rank	Employer	2010 rank
1	University of Arkansas	1
2	Washington Regional Medical Center	2
3	Walmart	5
4	Fayetteville School District	4
5	Veterans Administration Medical	3
6	City of Fayetteville	6
7	APAC Central, Inc.	NR
8	Pinnacle Foods	NR
9	Tyson Foods	NR
10	Washington County Government	7

Walmart is based in nearby Bentonville, Arkansas, and is one of five Fortune 500 corporations based in the state (the others are Dillard's, J.B. Hunt, Tyson Foods, and Windstream). Tyson Foods is based in Springdale, Arkansas, which is adjacent and to the north of Fayetteville. Although they are not based in Fayetteville, the corporations have a big impact through the University of Arkansas. The Sam M. Walton College of Business (named for Sam Walton) at the university has received numerous donations from the Walton family. Tyson also has a presence on campus at the Tyson Center for Excellence in Poultry Science, which holds classes for the Dale Bumpers College of Agricultural, Food and Life Sciences. The poultry science program at Arkansas is one of the Top 5 programs in the United States.

Transportation company J. B. Hunt is based in Lowell, Arkansas, which is between Rogers and Springdale. It has donated millions of dollars to the university's logistics program, including $10 million funding the J.B. Hunt Center for Academic Excellence that completed in 2010. The University of Arkansas has also been changing into a research-centered university since the late-20th century. The university's stated goals include becoming the economic engine for the region, the state of Arkansas, and beyond. This focus on innovation has helped draw students who were interested in research to Fayetteville. This shift in emphasis was recognized by the Carnegie Foundation for the Advancement of Teaching with classification in the category of "R1, Highest Research Activity," in 2011.

In 2011, DataRank, a company which provides businesses with tools for analyzing conversations about their brands and competitors, was founded in Fayetteville. In 2016, the City of Fayetteville announced its intention to become "The Startup City of the South" and work on further development of the entrepreneurial ecosystem. This endeavor is fostered through support from the University of Arkansas and non-profit initiatives such as the Walton Family Foundation and Community Venture Foundation.

== Arts and culture ==
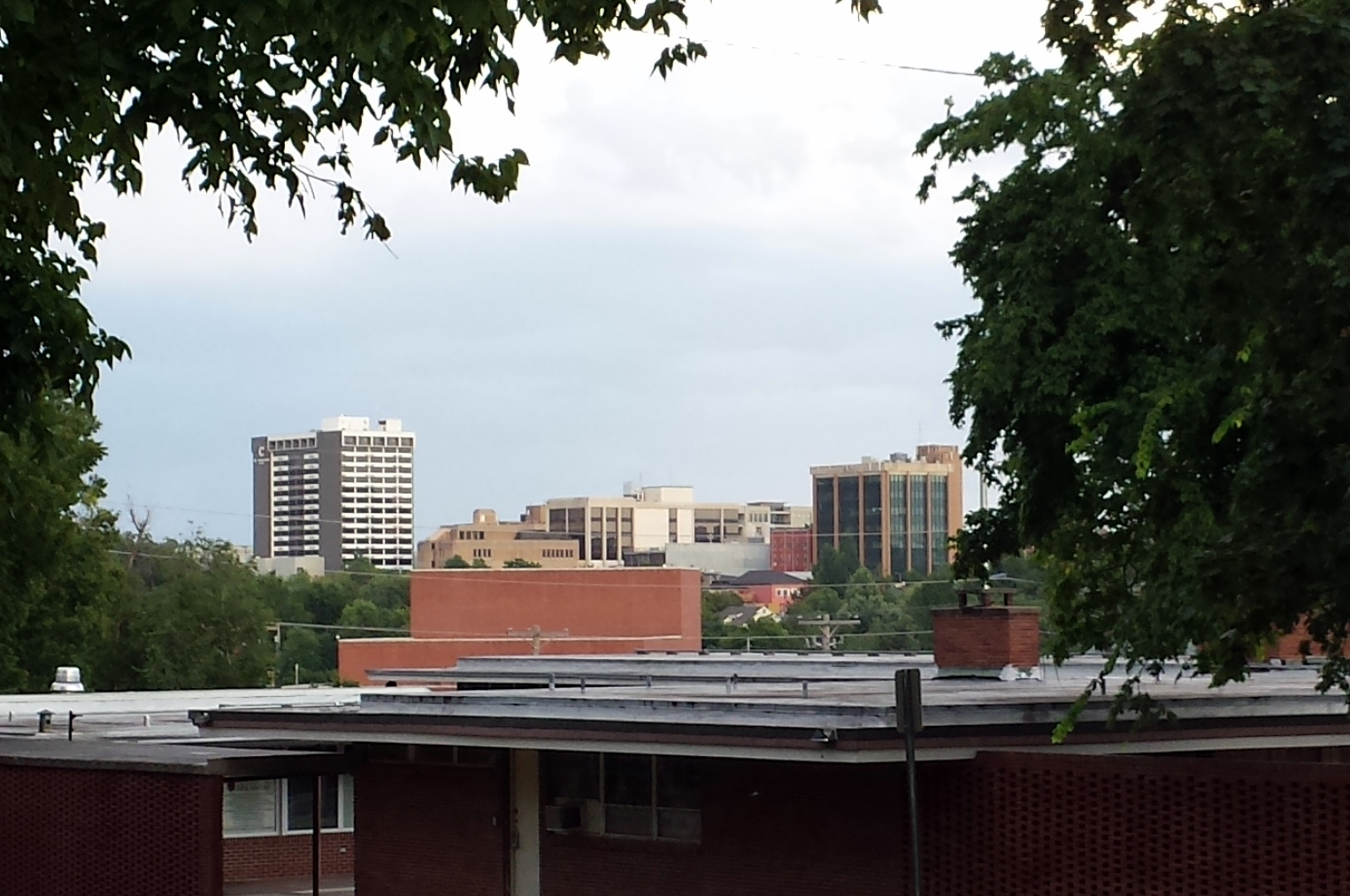
Downtown Fayetteville as seen from Old Main Lawn

Fayetteville's culture is a combination of a Southern city, college town, and the fast-growing Northwest Arkansas metro area.

Fayetteville shares many of the characteristics commonly given to Arkansas as a Southern state, yet it has also absorbed cultural influence from the Mid and South West. Located in the mid-South, Fayetteville's culture is distinct and it differs from the southeastern portion of the state and other Southeastern Conference college towns, areas more commonly associated with the Deep South. Many of the city's first settlers came from Mid South states like Kentucky and Tennessee, who found the Ozarks similar to the Appalachian Mountains back home. The uplands of Arkansas, including the Fayetteville area, did not participate in large-scale plantation farming with slaves like the Arkansas Delta, instead electing to settle in small clusters, relying largely on subsistence agriculture and hunting rather than the settlement patterns common in the Midwest and the Deep South. The hillbilly stereotype given to the Ozarks and Appalachians is largely a derivative of the difficult topography, poor quality or absent formal education, and mostly cashless self-sustaining economy found in those regions. Fayetteville's large proportion of Southern Baptist and Methodist adherents reflect a trend often associated with the Deep South.

The city also derives a cultural identity from the University of Arkansas, exhibiting many trademarks of a college town such as arts and music scene, socially-progressive residents, an emphasis on supporting local businesses, and a community focus on environmental sustainability. Fayetteville shares a passion for collegiate athletics similar to many other Southeastern Conference member institution cities including Oxford, Mississippi and College Station, Texas. Fall 2017 enrollment reports said that 55% of U of A students were from Arkansas, 42% from out of state, and the remaining 3% from foreign countries.

Fayetteville has a strong barbecue tradition, and the majority of the city's barbecue joints serve Memphis-style barbecue, with some Texas barbecue influence. Fayetteville is also home to a diverse array of dining options as Thai, Vietnamese, and Cajun eateries which are in the city's commercial districts. The Fayetteville Roots Festival, an annual celebration of local cuisine and music, only adds to the growing foodie culture of Northwest Arkansas with its community celebrations in the historic Fayetteville Square.

=== University of Arkansas ===
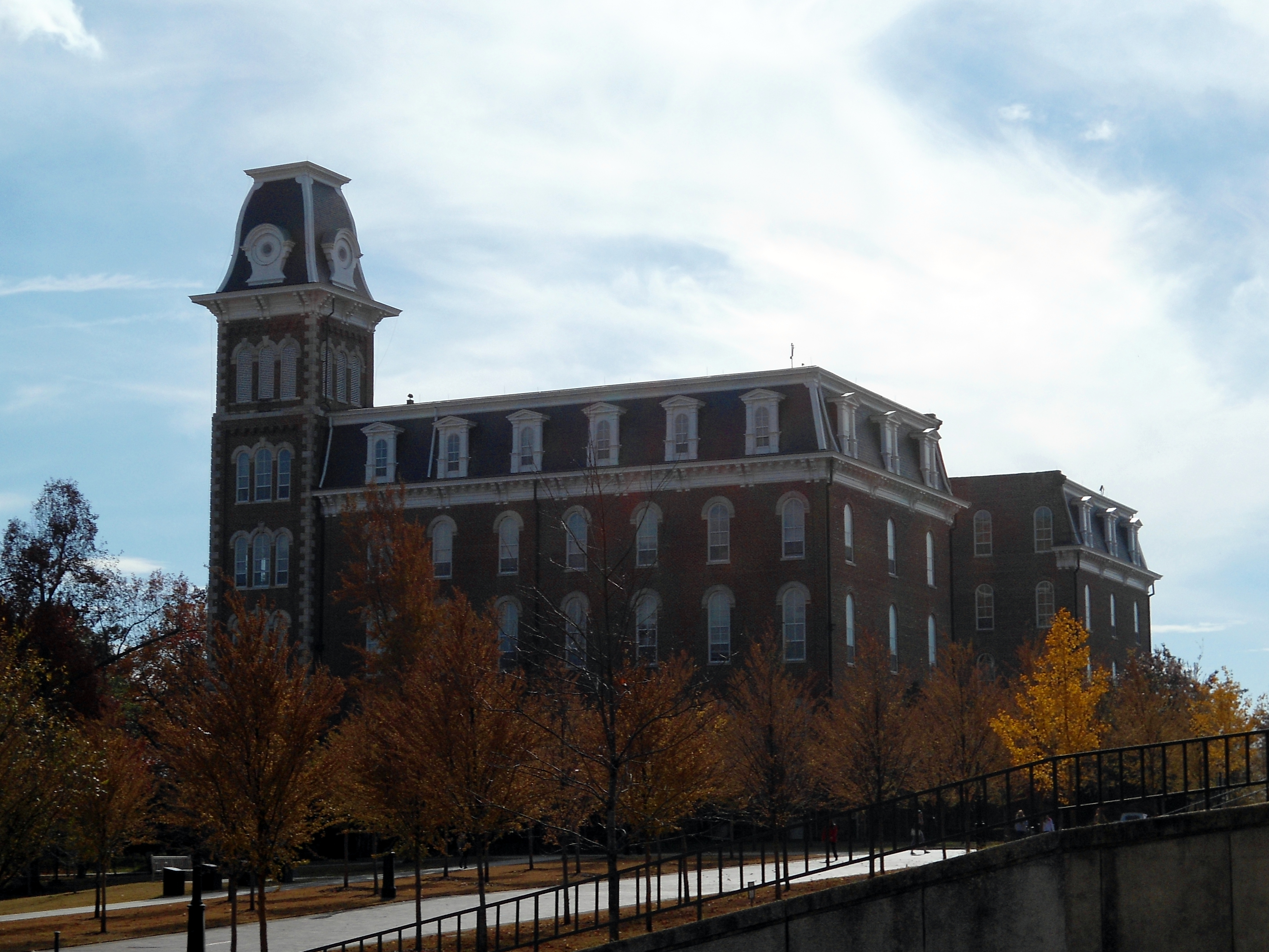
Old Main is the most recognizable image of the University of Arkansas and the focal point of the University of Arkansas Campus Historic District.

The University of Arkansas is Fayetteville's biggest attraction, with influence in the social, economic and educational aspects of Fayetteville. As the state's flagship university, U of A has become integrated with Fayetteville and vice versa. Currently ranked the #165th best university in the country, the University of Arkansas Campus Historic District listed on the National Register of Historic Places contains 71 acres (29 ha) and 25 buildings within a park-like arboretum. In autumn, hundreds of parents travel to Fayetteville to help their children move into the various residence halls and apartments in the area, with thousands more attending Razorback football home games. Fans return for basketball games to pack Bud Walton Arena, which was the fifth-largest on-campus arena upon completion. In spring the Hogs baseball team can be seen in Baum Stadium, named one of the top college baseball facilities in the South by Rivals.com in 2010 due to the use of a large donation by the Walton family. Senior Walk is a 5-mile (8.0 km) sidewalk record of every graduate from the University of Arkansas. It spans nearly the entire sidewalk network in the core of the campus.

During the last decade, the university has drawn a large influx of students from bordering states, largely due to the New Arkansan Non-Resident Tuition Award scholarship program. As of Spring 2018, nearly 40% of the student population is made up of students hailing from outside of Arkansas. As a result, student-centered off-campus apartments communities are being rapidly built to accommodate the growing student population.

=== Dickson Street ===
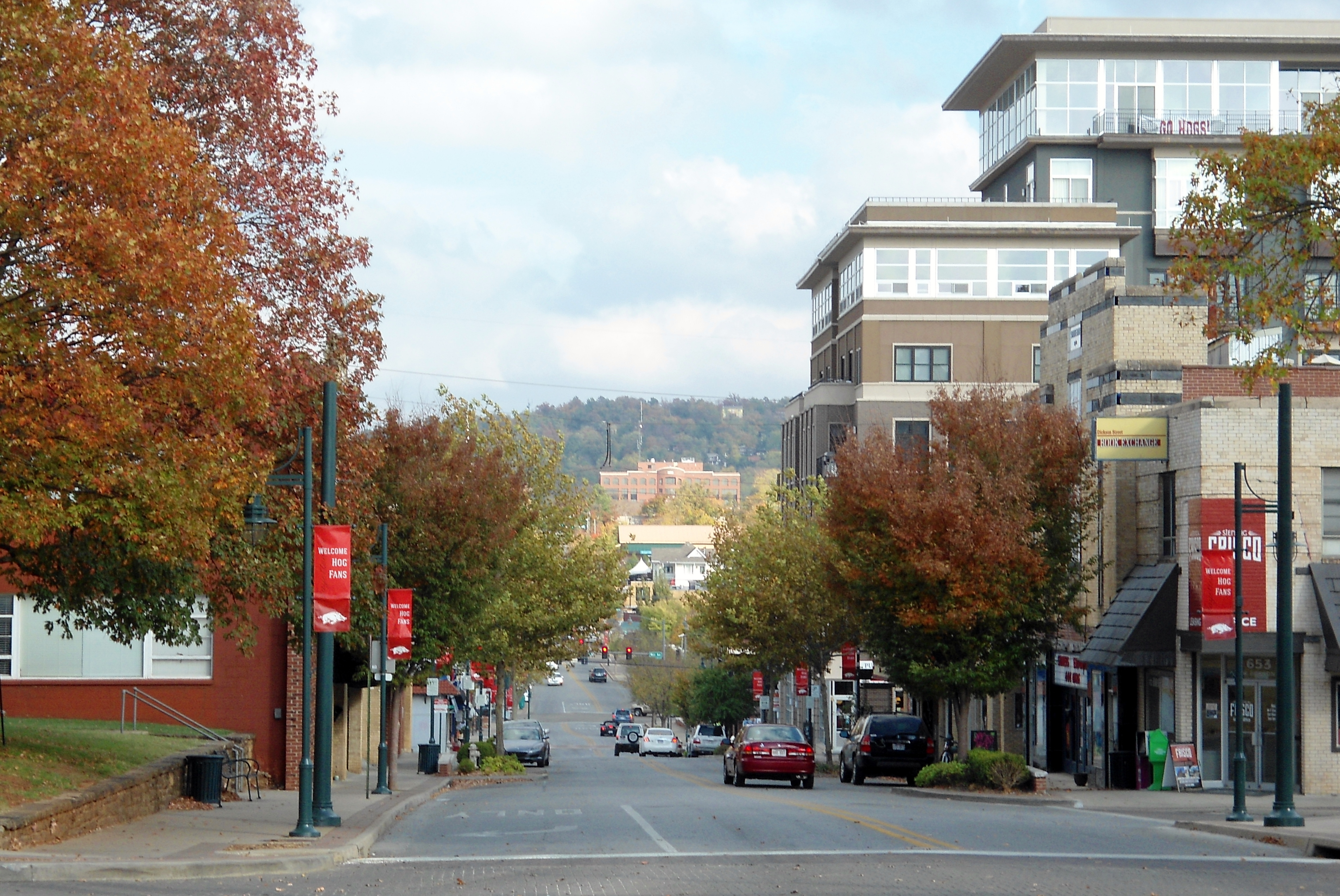
Looking down Dickson Street, the primary entertainment district in Fayetteville

Dickson Street is the primary entertainment district in the region, including musical and stage performances, shopping, bars, and restaurants. The West Dickson Street Commercial Historic District includes several blocks along its namesake street as well as a few blocks of West Avenue lined with unique shops, restaurants and bars. Adjacent to the University of Arkansas campus, several of Dickson Street's establishments cater to students and locals alike. The district has been enjoying a rejuvenation that began in the 1980s by Dickson Street merchants who had watched the street turn into a dilapidated, crime-filled area. Many businesses had relocated onto College Avenue, leaving Dickson Street empty and in disrepair. The steady improvements by local entrepreneurs during this time lured the Walton Arts Center, today Arkansas's premier center for arts and entertainment, to locate on Dickson Street, a decision that proved beneficial to all parties involved.

The Walton Arts Center is the result of a joint effort between the City of Fayetteville and the University of Arkansas to bring arts to the city. The center is located on Dickson Street halfway between the university and the town square. It features a full Broadway theater season, arts camps, continuing education opportunities for teachers of the arts, university-sponsored performances in addition to serving as a host for community events. A considerable donation from the namesake Walton family assisted greatly in the construction of the building.

TheatreSquared, Northwest Arkansas's only year-round professional regional theatre, is located just off Dickson Street, with an annual audience of 40,000 patrons including 18,500 students reached through outreach programs. The theatre was recognized in 2011 by the American Theatre Wing as one of the nation's ten most promising emerging theatres. Dickson Street is also home to George's Majestic Lounge, the oldest live music venue in Arkansas and one of the oldest bar and concert venues in the Midwest. Opened by George Pappas in 1927, George's was the first bar in the state to integrate in the late 1950s, and began hosting live concerts in the 1970s.

=== Fayetteville Square ===
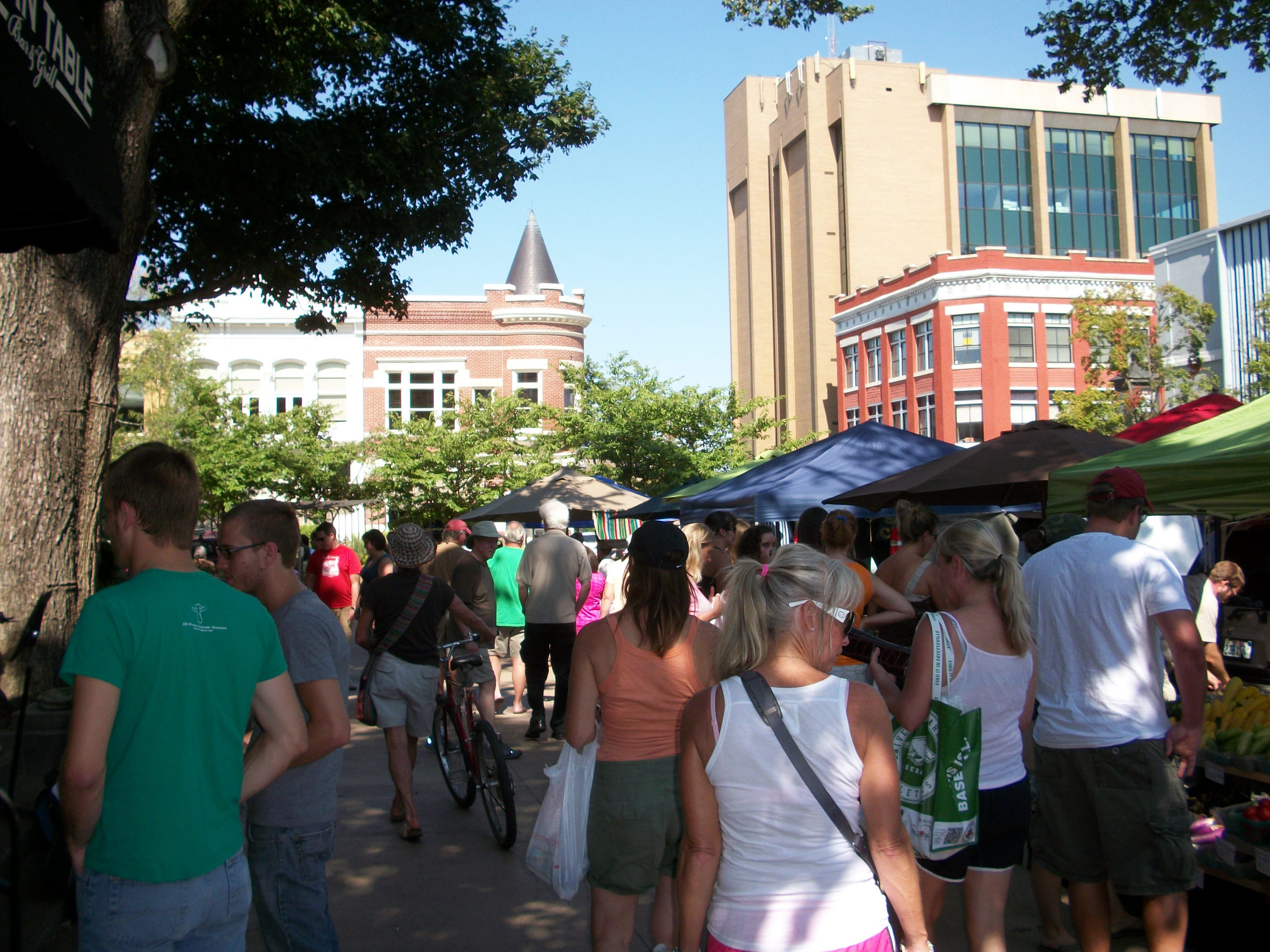
Fayetteville farmers' market on the Fayetteville Historic Square

The Fayetteville Historic Square has been the center of Fayetteville since the county's first courthouse was located there in 1829. The area is surrounded by wide sidewalks, landscaped gardens, and one-way streets. The Square plays host to a variety of events, including First Thursday on the Square, the Strawberry Festival, Sundays on the Square and the Lights of the Ozarks Festival, Last Night Fayetteville, and Fayetteville Farmer's Market. Containing boutiques, restaurants, music venues, museums, condos, the visitor center, and a convention center, the square has both historic structures and new constructions.

The farmers' market began in 1974 and runs 7am to 1pm from the first Saturday in April through the last Saturday before Thanksgiving set in the Fayetteville Historic Square. Over 60 vendors provide locally grown fruits and vegetables in addition to crafts, flower bouquets, music and art, making the Fayetteville Farmers' Market very diverse. Since receiving a grant in 2011, the Fayetteville Farmers' Market has accepted electronic benefit transfer (EBT) and food stamps. The market has been lauded by the Farmers Market Coalition for its formatting which allows farmers to interact directly with customers and also empowering each vendor with a vote before making major changes in market policy. The farmers' market moves to the Botanical Garden of the Ozarks for Sunday mornings with 20–30 vendors, with some vendors also choosing to attend the Mill District Farmer's Market on Thursday evenings.

The Fayetteville Public Library, founded in 1916, was moved in October 2004 into a $23 million building, which was the first "green" building in Arkansas. The Blair Library was awarded the 2005 Thomson Gale Library Journal Honorable Mention Library of the Year award, and as a testament to its popularity has seen its popularity increase, with twice as many items checked out in 2005 than in 1997. The library has a local coffeeshop called Arsaga's, and hosts several events including film festivals, book signings, and public forums throughout the year.

=== Historic districts and properties ===
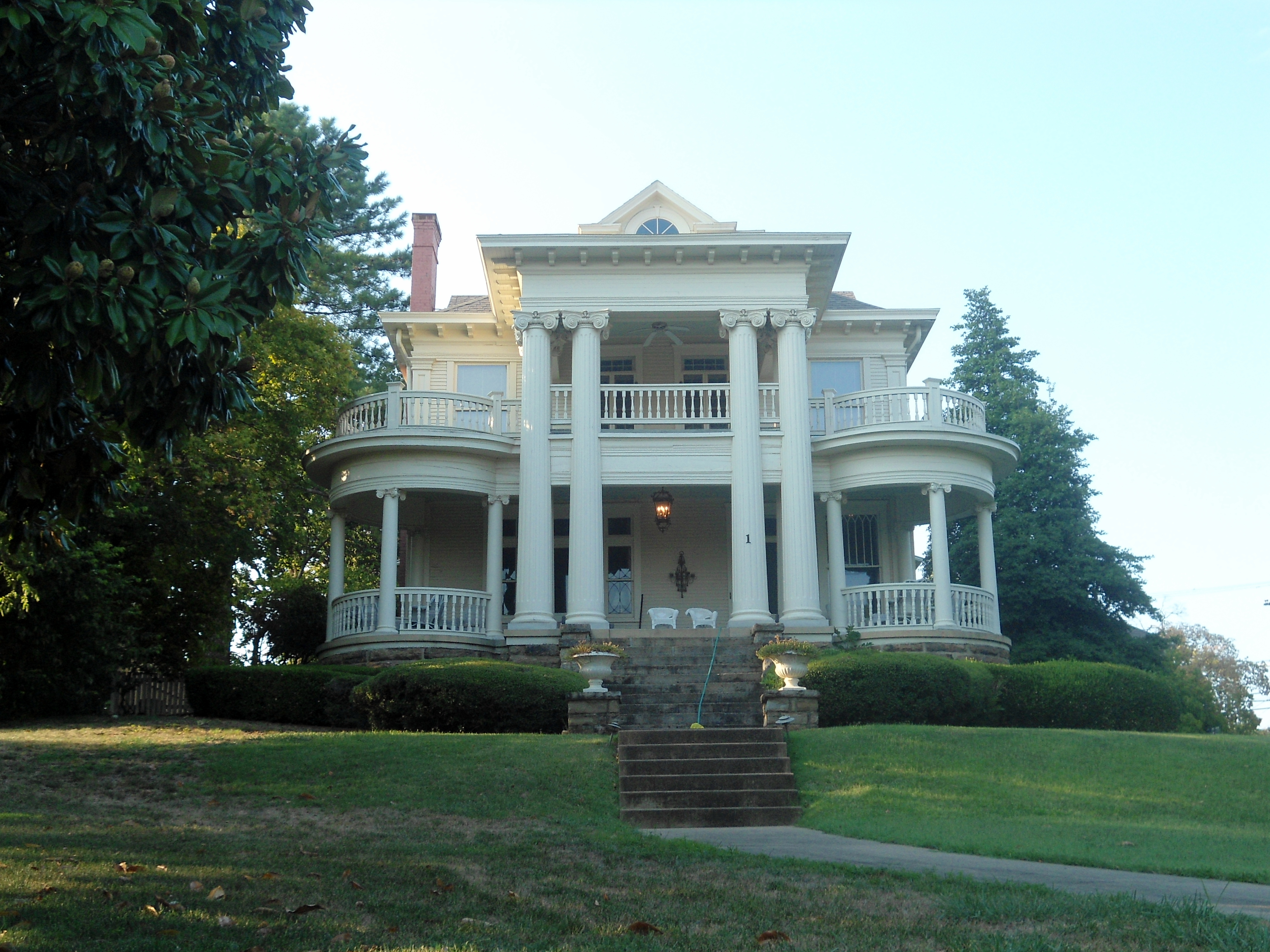
The Pritchard House, built in 1900, is in the Mount Nord Historic District.

Fayetteville contains 40 listings on the National Register of Historic Places (NRHP), the official federal list of districts, sites, buildings, structures, and objects deemed worthy of preservation. The University of Arkansas Campus Historic District constitutes the historic core of the UA campus. Residential historic districts with historically and architecturally significant contributions to Fayetteville include the Mount Nord Historic District, Washington-Willow Historic District, and Wilson Park Historic District. The Square is anchored by five NRHP structures; the original Fayetteville post office built in 1911, the Old Bank of Fayetteville Building, the Lewis Brothers Building constructed in 1908, the Mrs. Young Building built in 1887, and the Guisinger Building. The former Washington County Courthouse and Old Washington County Jail are located one block east of the Square.

The Headquarters House, which served as a command post in the city for both the Union and Confederacy during the Civil War, has become a museum. The Fayetteville National Cemetery is listed on the NRHP. Built in 1867 after the Civil War, the cemetery has been expanded from its original 1,800 interments to over 7,000 interments.

Fayetteville was the first home of Bill and Hillary Clinton while they both taught law at the University of Arkansas School of Law. The house where they were married and which was their residence became the Clinton House Museum highlighting Bill's early political life and features campaign memorabilia, a replica of Hillary's wedding dress, a photo gallery, and footage from Bill's early campaign commercials.

== Sports ==
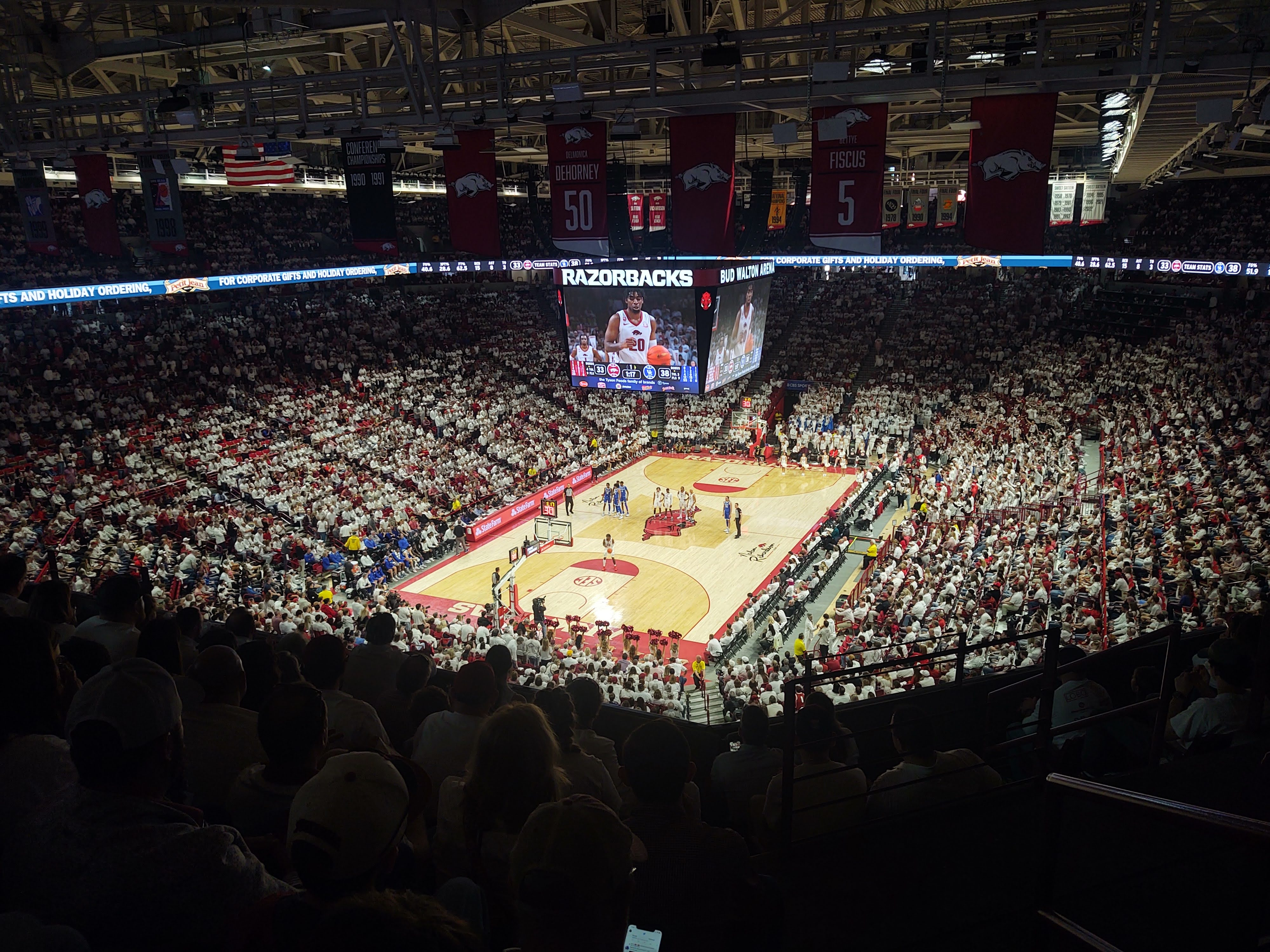
Bud Walton Arena is home to the Arkansas Razorbacks basketball teams.

Fayetteville does not host any professional sports teams, allowing the Arkansas Razorbacks to control the sports scene. The Razorbacks (sometimes referred to as Hogs) are frequently referred to as "The State of Arkansas's Professional Team". The Razorbacks compete in the National Collegiate Athletic Association's Division I and the Southeastern Conference.

Donald W. Reynolds Razorback Stadium plays host to the Arkansas Razorbacks football team, usually hosting 6–7 home football games each season. One game is scheduled yearly at War Memorial Stadium in Little Rock, Arkansas, although there has been discussion of moving these games to Fayetteville in recent years. Some major high school football games in the state are played in Razorback Stadium as well. Bud Walton Arena is home to the Arkansas men's and women's basketball teams. This facility was built in 1993 and holds a capacity of 19,368. Arkansas volleyball plays in Barnhill Arena in addition to the Razorbacks gymnastics team, also on the campus of the University of Arkansas. The Arkansas Razorbacks baseball team plays in Baum Stadium at George Cole Field, one of the nation's top 25 college baseball facilities. The softball team plays in the newly built Bogle Park on campus.

Due to the success of Arkansas's track and cross country teams, Fayetteville is sometimes called the "Track Capital of the South". The city has hosted the National Collegiate Athletic Association (NCAA) Division I Indoor Track and Field Championships at the Randal Tyson Track Center, one of the world's fastest surfaces. Arkansas also has hosted the Outdoor Track and Field Championships track facility at John McDonnell Field, named the "Top Outdoor Track and Field Facility of the Year" by the American Sports Builders Association in 2002. The Blessings golf course is a golf course located along Clear Creek in Fayetteville designed by Robert Trent Jones Jr. It is said to be one of the most difficult and strangely designed golf courses in the U.S. The course is home to the University of Arkansas Razorbacks golf teams.

The Northwest Arkansas Naturals Baseball Club are the (AA) minor league affiliate of the Kansas City Royals Baseball Club in Major League Baseball. The club plays at Arvest Ballpark which is in nearby Springdale. The 2022 UCI Cyclo-cross World Championships was held in Fayetteville. The Ozark United FC is an upcoming professional football club located in nearby Rogers, expected to officially launch in 2025, with 2026 being its inaugural season. It is intended to serve the Northwest Arkansas region as a whole.

== Parks and recreation ==
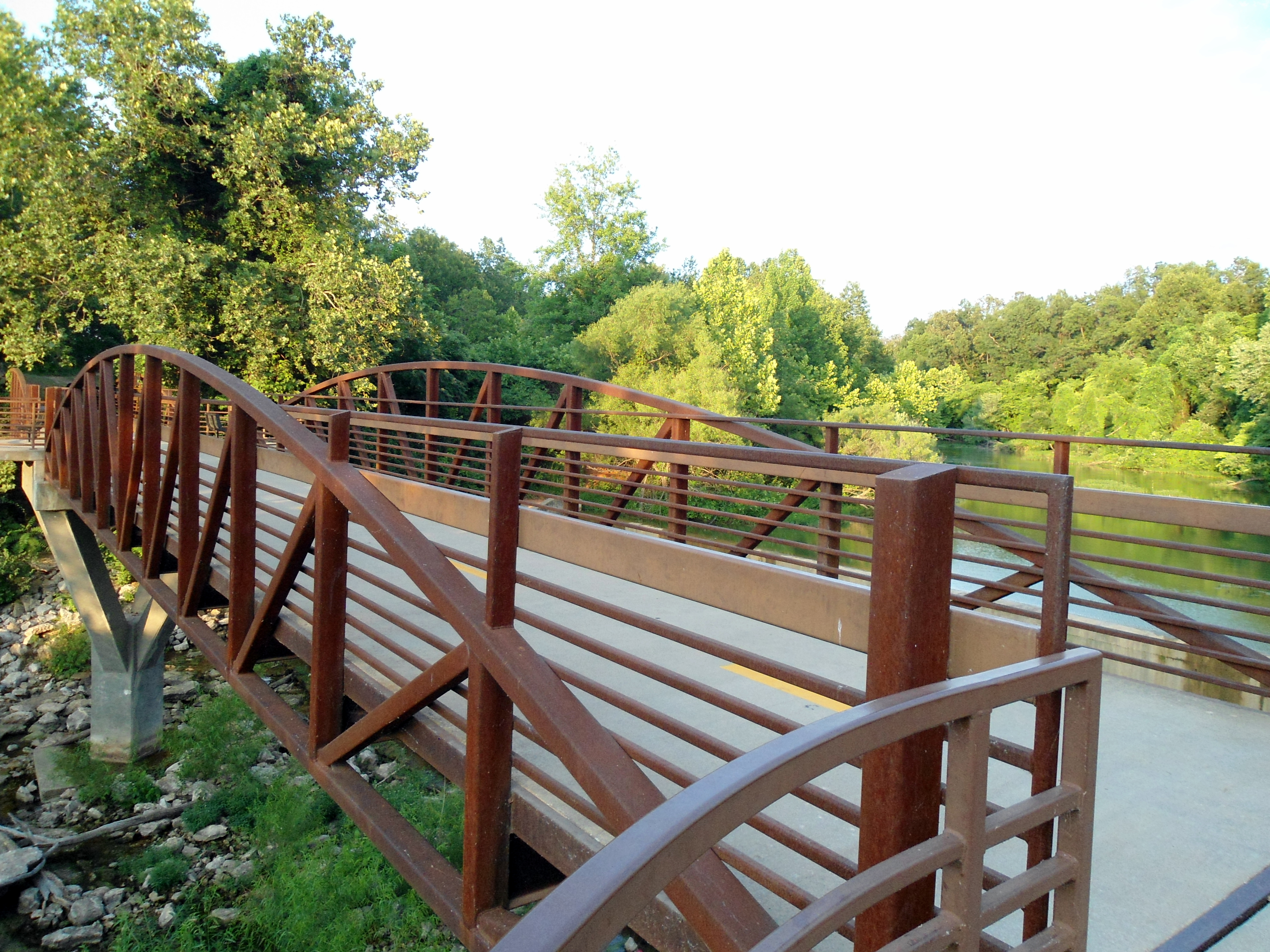
Lake Fayetteville Trail bridge near the spillway

The Fayetteville Parks and Recreation Department maintains 70 parks whose total land area makes up 3,129 acres (1,266 ha). The National Wildlife Federation has listed many parks and trails in Fayetteville as Certified Wildlife Habitats, which provide food, water, shelter, and a nurturing environment for young wildlife. A favorite park in Fayetteville is Wilson Park, which anchors the Wilson Park Historic District. The park was the city's first, and today contains a swimming pool, two playgrounds, a baseball field, picnic areas, and a 1981 castle in addition to courts for volleyball, basketball and tennis. The National Register of Historic Places-listed historic district encompasses 47 homes constructed in the late 19th and early 20th century along the southern edge of the park.

A new addition to the Fayetteville parks scene is the Botanical Garden of the Ozarks. First envisioned in 1993, the Botanical Garden Society of the Ozarks raised funds for the facility until beginning construction in 2003. Planned to be built in three stages, the first stage has been completed and includes a visitor center, cafe, and garden gateway. Stage one also includes one-third of the total planned gardens and half the maintenance facilities. Fayetteville takes pride in its trail system, and has been named a Bicycle Friendly Community by the League of American Bicyclists since 2010. Trails in Fayetteville are well-marked with signs along the route in addition to road crossings. The city maintains trails within the city limits and segments of inter-city trails such as the Razorback Regional Greenway. The Razorback Greenway is a 36-mile (58 km), primarily off-road, shared-use trail which connects Fayetteville with Bella Vista via Johnson, Springdale, Lowell, Bentonville, and Rogers.

The Fayetteville trail system is anchored by the Scull Creek Trail, a north–south paved trail which is 3.93 miles (6.32 km) in length and 12 feet (3.7 m) wide. It crosses the namesake creek six times on arching steel bridges and also uses a 650-foot (200 m) tunnel, at one time the only pedestrian tunnel in Arkansas. A trail of 3.7 miles (6.0 km) named the Dickson Street/U of A loop links around the campus of the University of Arkansas and ends at the corner of Dickson Street and College Avenue. The Fayetteville Master Plan includes provisions for over 100 miles (160 km) of multi-use trails in the city. Approximately 2 to 3 miles (3.2 to 4.8 km) are added to the system per year.

== Government ==
=== Mayor–city council ===
Fayetteville operates within the mayor–city council form of government. The mayor is elected by a citywide election to serve as the chief executive officer (CEO) of the city by presiding over all city functions, policies, rules and laws. Once elected, the mayor also allocates duties to city employees. The Fayetteville mayoral election in coincidence with the election of the president of the United States. Mayors serve four-year terms and can serve unlimited terms. The city council is the unicameral legislative of the city, consisting of eight aldermen. Also included in the council's duties is balancing the city's budget and passing ordinances. The body also controls the representatives of specialized city commissions underneath their jurisdiction. Two aldermen are elected from each of the city's four wards.

=== Citizen boards, commissions, and committees ===
Citizen input is welcomed through the use of various specialized groups. Although some positions are appointed by the mayor, many are held by volunteers. Requirements to serve include being a resident of Fayetteville and submitting an application in order to gain access to any of Fayetteville's 28 city boards. The boards have appointed positions ranging from ones on the Northwest Arkansas Regional Planning Commission to the Fayetteville Arts Council and the Fayetteville Public Library Board of Trustees to the Historic District Commission and the Tree and Landscape Advisory Committee.

=== Judicial system ===
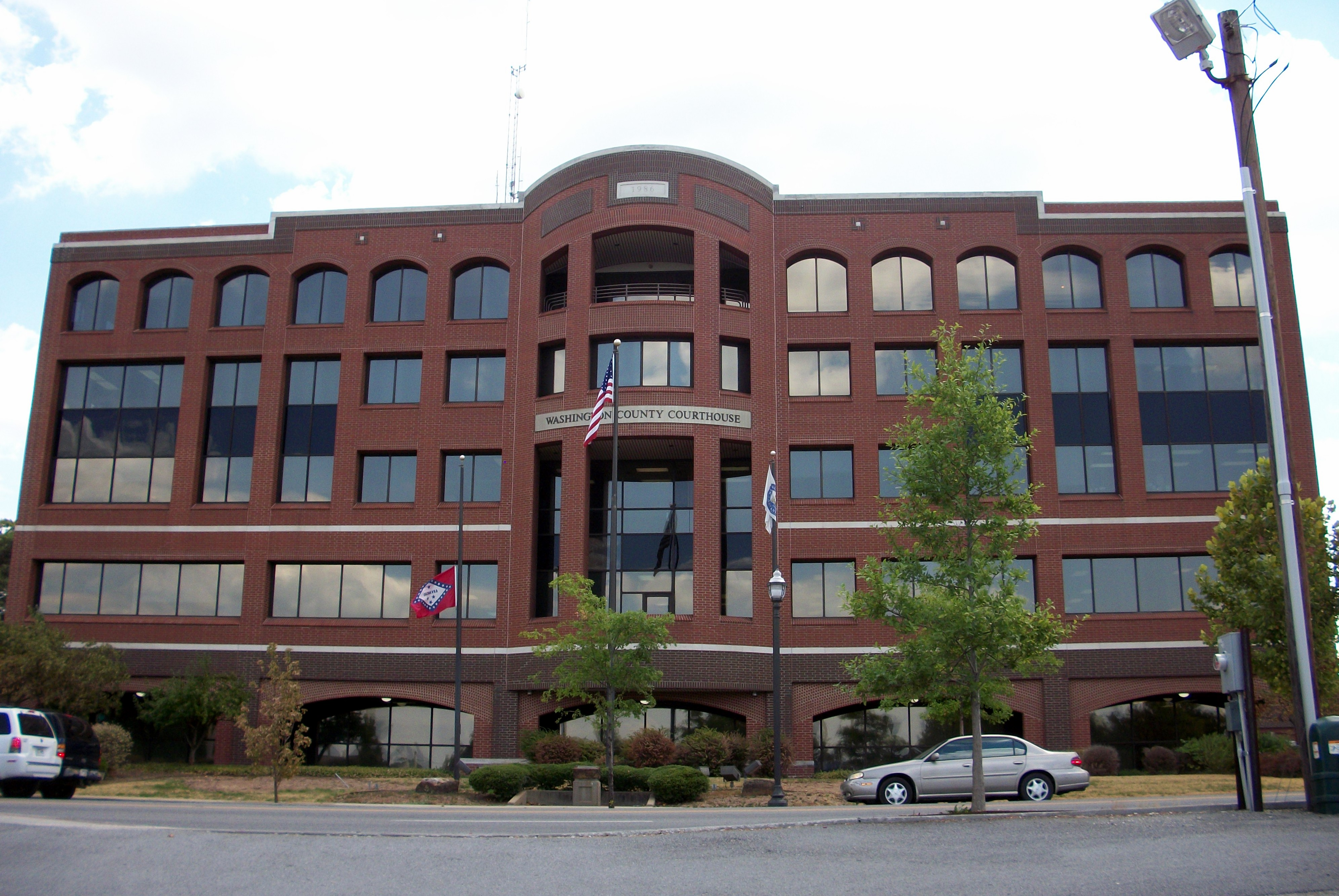
Washington County bought the First South Centre in 1994, and it became the Washington County Courthouse, replacing the previous structure, which was built in 1905.

The Fayetteville District Court is located at 176 S Church Avenue in downtown Fayetteville, and is presided over by the district judge, who is elected in a citywide election. The court handles criminal, civil, small claims, and traffic matters within the city limits. Beyond city court, Fayetteville is under the jurisdiction of the Fayetteville Department of Washington County District Court. The Washington County District Court was a local district court, meaning it is presided over by part-time judges who may privately practice law. The court became a state district court and is presided over by a full-time judge as of 2017. Superseding that jurisdiction is the 4th Judicial Circuit Court, which covers Washington and Madison counties. The circuit court has seven circuit judges.

=== Politics ===
The incumbent mayor of Fayetteville is Molly Rawn. Rawn was elected in 2024, defeating longtime incumbent mayor Lioneld Jordan.

The state representatives who serve districts containing portions of Fayetteville are Rep. Nicole Clowney (D), Rep. David Whitaker (D), Rep. Robin Lundstrum (R), Rep. Kendra Moore (R), and Rep. Denise Garner (D). The state senators who serve districts containing portions of Fayetteville are Sen. Greg Leding and Sen. Tyler Dees.

== Education ==
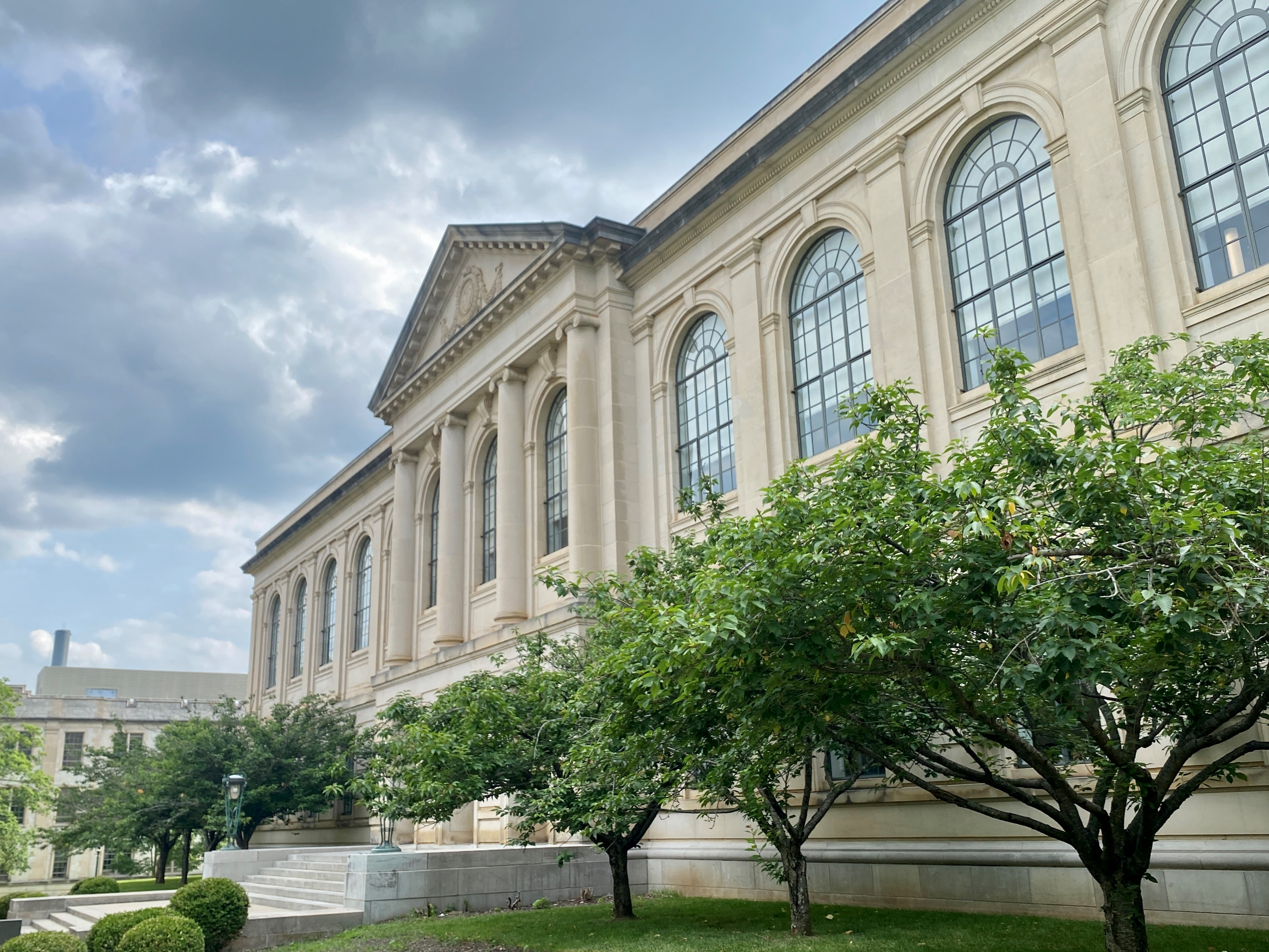
Vol Walker Hall on the University of Arkansas campus

Most of Fayetteville is served by the Fayetteville Public Schools system, which consists of eight elementary schools, four intermediate schools, two special schools, and Fayetteville High School. The district was established in 1871 as the oldest school district in Arkansas. Fayetteville High School has been recognized by Newsweek as one of the South's top 500 high schools based on Advanced Placement (AP) courses as well as AP test scores. The school's student literary magazine and athletics programs have also received regional praise. Sections of Fayetteville are zoned to Farmington School District (operating Farmington High School in Farmington, Arkansas), Greenland School District (operating Greenland High School in Greenland, Arkansas), and Springdale Public Schools; In 2006 the portion of Fayetteville in the Springdale district was divided between the zones of Har-Ber and Springdale high schools.

Fayetteville is also home of Haas Hall Academy, a public charter school independent of all of the public school districts. Although Haas Hall Academy is in Fayetteville, the school serves students across Arkansas. Haas Hall was established in 2004 as the first open-enrollment public charter high school in Arkansas. The school has been recognized by Newsweek as the best school in Arkansas and 342nd best school in the nation. The nearest Catholic high school is Ozark Catholic Academy in Tontitown.

The University of Arkansas was founded in Fayetteville in 1871 as Arkansas Industrial University. The land-grant/space-grant, high-activity research institution is the flagship campus of the University of Arkansas System. Enrollment for the 2010 fall semester was 21,406 total students. Approximately 84% are Arkansas natives, with about 2% being international students due to the general lack of diversity in the region. Although it offers over 200 degree choices (excluding doctorate fields), the university is noted for its above average architecture, history, creative writing, poultry science, and business programs. Because of the University of Arkansas's large presence in many aspects of the city's economy, culture, and lifestyle, Fayetteville is often portrayed as a college town with elements of dominance by Walmart.

== Media ==
The Fayetteville market is defined as Washington and Benton Counties and is called the Northwest Arkansas market by Arbitron. The two-county area was ranked 127th in the nation with a listening/viewing population (age 12+) of 356,900 as of Spring 2011.

=== Radio ===
Two stations are operated by the University of Arkansas, KXUA 88.3 FM, which is the student-run station and KUAF, 91.3 FM, a national public radio (NPR) station. Cumulus Media owns seven stations in the Northwest Arkansas market, KFAY 1030 AM (news talk), KYNG 1590 AM, KQSM-FM 92.1 FM (ESPN Radio), KAMO-FM 94.3 FM (classic country music), KRMW 94.9 FM, KKEG 98.3 FM (classic rock), and KMCK-FM 105.7 FM (Top 40). IHeartMedia owns four radio stations in the area, including KIGL 93.3 FM (classic rock), KMXF 101.9 FM (Top 40), KKIX 103.9 FM (country music) and KEZA 107.9 FM (adult contemporary). Hog Radio, Inc. owns three radio stations in the area, including KAKS 99.5 FM (an ESPN Radio affiliate), KFMD-FM 101.5 (Hot AC), and KXRD 96.7 FM (country music). Butler Communications owns KXNA 104.9 FM (new rock), KREB 1190 AM, and KFFK 1390 AM. Kerm, Inc. operates two News Talk Information stations: KURM 790 AM and KLTK 1140 AM. KSEC 95.7 broadcasts in the Mexican Regional format and KFFK 1390 AM of Butler Communications broadcasts in the Spanish News/Talk format. Religious stations include KAYH 89.3 FM, KBNV 90.1 FM, and KLRC 90.9 FM. All sports radio station KUOA 1290 AM is rebroadcast on 105.3 in Fayetteville and features Arkansas Razorbacks coverage. KISR 95.9 FM is translated to Fayetteville from Fort Smith. Smaller operations include KPBI 1250 AM (news talk information) and KBVA 106.5 FM (Classic Hits/Oldies/Adult Standards/Adult Contemporary). Fayetteville Community Radio, The Public Square, KPSQ-LP (97.3 FM), operates via a low-power license granted by the FCC.

=== Local TV stations ===
Television Stations in the Fayetteville area include:

- KAFT (AETN) 13 - PBS
- KFSM 5 – CBS
- KFTA 24 – Fox
- KHOG 29 – ABC / The CW
- KNWA 51 – NBC
- KXNW 34 – MyNetworkTV

=== Local newspapers ===
- Arkansas Democrat-Gazette
- The Morning News
- Northwest Arkansas Democrat Gazette (consolidation of the Northwest Arkansas Times)
- The Fayetteville Free Weekly
- Washington County Observer
- The University of Arkansas Traveler

=== Local online media ===
- Fayetteville Flyer

== Infrastructure ==
=== Transportation ===
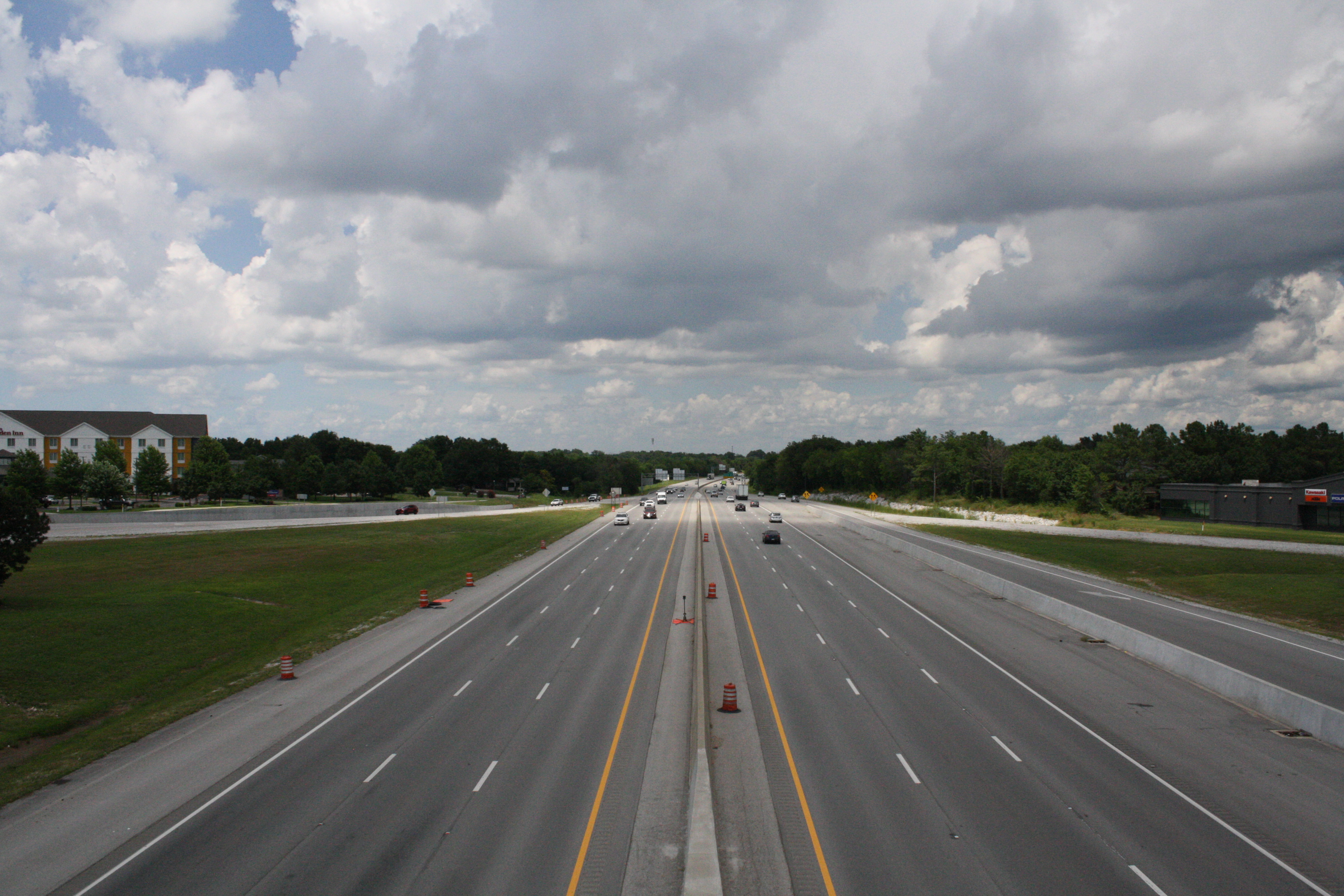
Looking north along I-49 at the Wedington Drive overpass in Fayetteville

==== Major highways ====
- Interstate 49
- US Route 62
- US Route 71
- US Route 71 Business
- Highway 16
- Highway 16 Spur
- Highway 45
- Highway 112
- Highway 180
- Highway 265

The major through route in Fayetteville is Interstate 49/US 71. The fully controlled access, four-lane expressway is a discontinuous piece of a route ultimately planned to connect Kansas City, Missouri, to New Orleans. Formerly designated as Interstate 540 with the re-designation as Interstate 49 being granted by the U S Department of Transportation Federal Highway Administration on March 28, 2014, the highway became the first freeway in the area when it was completed in the 1990s to relieve the former US 71 (now US 71B) of a much-increased demand of through travelers following the unanticipated and rapid growth of the Northwest Arkansas metro. area. Future plans for the I-49 corridor include completion of a freeway segment through Western Arkansas to Texarkana.

Other major north–south routes in Fayetteville include US 71B, which was the predecessor to I-49/US 71. This route is mostly designated College Avenue in Fayetteville and features dozens of restaurants and stores. To the east of College Avenue is the oldest road in Fayetteville, Arkansas Highway 265. This route first was used by Native Americans as the Great Osage Trail, followed by Civil War troops bound for Fort Smith, Arkansas, the Trail of Tears, the Butterfield Overland Mail stagecoach route, and later still the telegraph. To the west of College Avenue is Gregg Avenue, which contains many student-oriented apartments along its shoulders and further west is Garland Avenue. This route runs along the campus of the University of Arkansas in south Fayetteville, with apartments and duplexes along its northern routing.

==== Public transportation ====
The city of Fayetteville has two major providers of public transportation. Razorback Transit is a free bus system centered on the campus of the University of Arkansas with routes to other Fayetteville destinations such as Dickson Street or the Northwest Arkansas Mall. Ozark Regional Transit runs throughout both Washington and Benton counties and is a broader bus-based regional transit system. Jefferson Lines provides intercity bus service connecting Fayetteville to much of the Midwest.

==== Aviation ====
Drake Field, formerly Fayetteville Municipal Airport, is owned by the city and serves general aviation. The nearest airport for commercial flights is Northwest Arkansas National Airport (XNA), 17 miles northwest of the city. The airport opened in 1998. Drake Field receives many sports charters year round because of the Arkansas Razorbacks using the airport.

=== Utilities ===
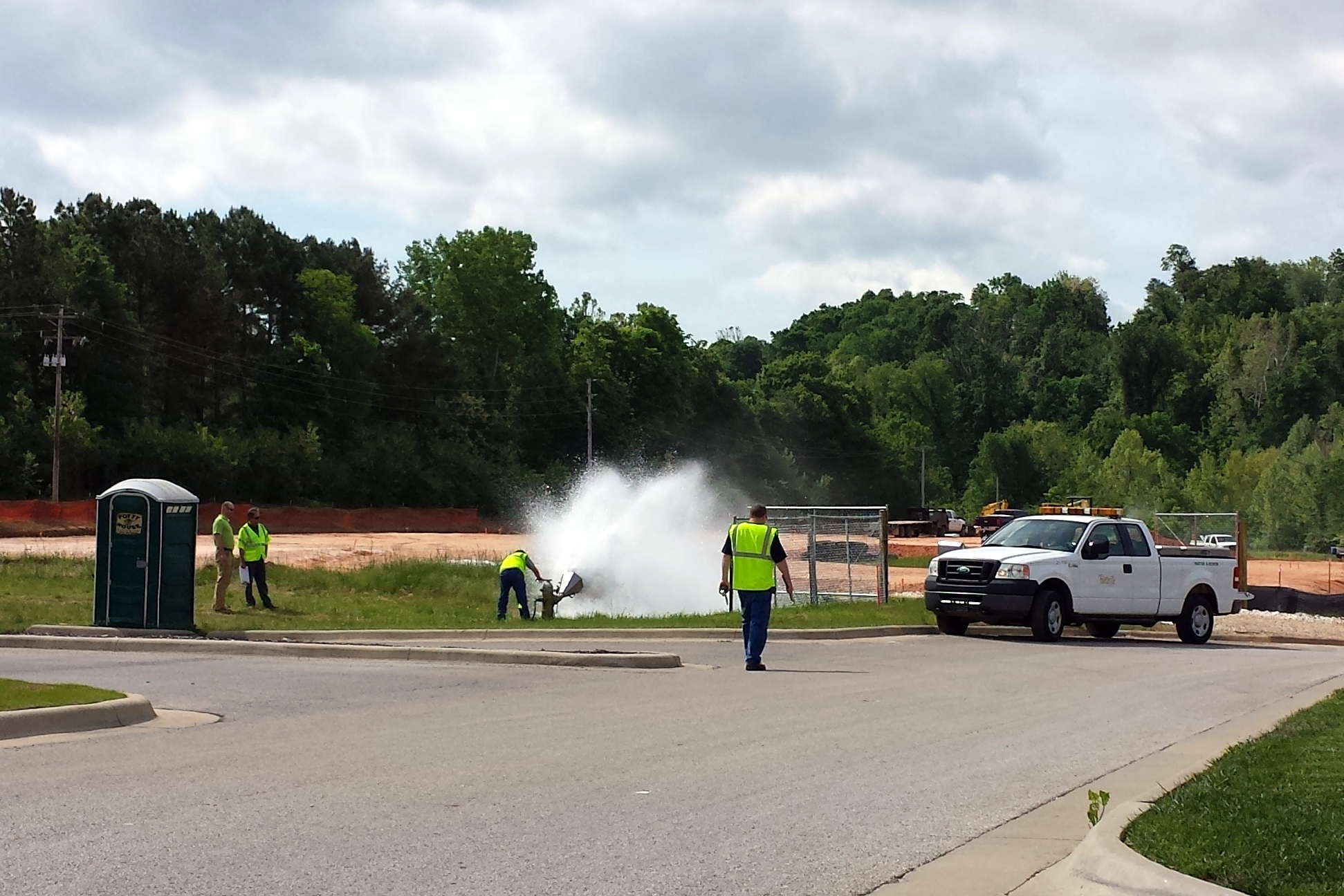
City crew flushing a fire hydrant in Uptown Fayetteville

The City of Fayetteville owns and operates a large water system which provides services to several municipalities and unincorporated areas in the northern half of Washington County in addition to Fayetteville residents. Drinking water is pumped in from the Beaver Water District treatment plant in Lowell. The city uses 16 million US gallons (61 ML) of water per day on average.

==== Wastewater ====
Fayetteville owns its own wastewater operation, including a network of pipes and lift stations which convey wastewater to the city's two wastewater treatment plants. Both plants are operated by CH2M and regulated by the Arkansas Department of Environmental Quality (ADEQ). Historically, all sewage was sent to the Paul R. Noland Wastewater Treatment Plant (Noland WWTP) on the east side of town. However, development on the city's west side as well as the expense of pumping wastewater over East Mountain led the city to build the West Side WWTP in 2008. In addition to these two facilities, Fayetteville also operates 39 lift stations to pump wastewater over steep elevation rises in order to utilize gravity flow toward the WWTPs. Fayetteville also maintains a biosolids management program, in which biosolids, a byproduct of wastewater treatment, are land applied to provide nutrients to soil on which crops are grown.

Fayetteville's first wastewater treatment arrived in 1913 in the form of an Imhoff tank on the West Fork of the White River. The facility was improved several times throughout the years until the construction of the City of Fayetteville Water Pollution Control Facility downstream of Lake Sequoyah. The plant was built in 1968 and has had major upgrades and was expanded. The Noland WWTP is designed for a flow rate of 12.6 million US gallons (48 ML) per day. The West Side WWTP has a design flow of 10 million US gallons (38 ML) per day with a peak flow capacity of 32 million US gallons (120 ML) per day during wet weather.

Fayetteville's biosolids program was conceived after concerns about the costs and sustainability of landfill dumping arose. The city initiated a land application program on a farm site near the Noland plant which allowed the city to apply biosolids and then grow and harvest hay. In 2010, solar energy became the main component of the solids dewatering process after the installation of six solar dryers. From this program, the city gains additional revenue from the sale of hay and fertilizer (Class A biosolids).
