= Fayetteville Public Schools =

School district in Arkansas

Location
- Fayetteville, Arkansas United States

District information
- Type: Public
- Motto: Learn. Grow. Perform. Lead.
- Grades: K-12
- Established: 1871
- Superintendent: Dr. John Mulford
- Accreditation: Arkansas Department of Education
- Schools: 15
- Budget: $99,105,109 (2010–11)

Students and staff
- Students: 8400
- Teachers: 710
- Staff: 590
- Athletic conference: 7A West

Other information
- Schedule: US standard
- Website: www.fayar.net

The Fayetteville Public Schools (Fayetteville School District, or FPS) is a public school district in Fayetteville, Arkansas. It was the first public school district chartered in the state of Arkansas, having been established in 1871, the same year as the University of Arkansas (also in Fayetteville). It is accredited by the Arkansas Department of Education. The Fayetteville school district's public schools would successfully integrate in 1954, three years before the Little Rock Nine.

In addition to the majority of Fayetteville, the district also serves most of Goshen and Johnson and portions of Elkins and Farmington.

In 2013, the district was awarded as a U.S. Department of Education Green Ribbon School.

== List of schools ==
=== High/Secondary Schools ===
- Fayetteville High School

=== Middle/intermediate schools ===
- Holt Middle School
- McNair Middle School
- John L. Colbert Middle School
- Ramay Junior High School
- Woodland Junior High School

=== Elementary/Primary Schools ===
- Asbell Elementary School
- Butterfield Trail Elementary School
- Happy Hollow Elementary School
- Holcomb Elementary School
- Leverett Elementary School
- Owl Creek Elementary
- Root Elementary School
- Vandergriff Elementary School
- Washington Elementary School

In 2009, Vandergriff Elementary School received top honors from the U.S. Department of Education (ED) in being named a National Blue Ribbon School.

=== Special Schools & Programs ===
- Owl Creek School (Also an elementary) (Pre K-6)
- Lake Fayetteville Environmental Study Center
- Fayetteville Virtual Academy

=== Alternative Education ===
- ALLPS School of Innovation (9-12)

== Administration ==
The Fayetteville School Board consists of seven members who are elected to five year terms. The members of the board meet regularly on the fourth Thursday of each month at 5 pm Central Time in the Adams Leadership Center.

== See also ==
- List of school districts in Arkansas
