= List of biblical place names in North America =

North America has numerous places named after biblical towns and places.

== North America list ==
Province/ State	Subdivision	Place	Biblical Place	First Biblical Mention (according to KJV order of books)
(Alabama) AL	Limestone County	Athens	Athens	Acts 17:15
(Alabama) AL	Houston County	Dothan	Dothan	Genesis 37:17
(Alabama) AL	Cullman County & Marshall County	Joppa	Jaffa	Joshua 19:46
(Alabama) AL	Etowah County & Marshall County	Sardis City	Sardis	Revelation 3:1
(Alaska) AK	Unorganized Borough	Bethel	Bethel	Genesis 12:8
(Alaska) AK	Unorganized Borough	Elim	Elim	Exodus 15:27
(Arizona) AZ	Maricopa County	Phoenix	Phoenix	Acts 27:12
(Arkansas) AR	Craighead County	Antioch	Antioch	Acts 6:5
(Arkansas) AR	Howard County	Athens	Athens	Acts 17:15
(Arkansas) AR	Benton County	Bethel Heights	Bethel	Genesis 12:8
(Arkansas) AR	Greene County	Bethel	Bethel	Genesis 12:8
(Arkansas) AR	Conway County	Bethlehem	Bethlehem	Genesis 35:19
(Arkansas) AR	Prairie County	Beulah	Beulah	Isaiah 62:4
(Arkansas) AR	Searcy County	Canaan	Canaan	Genesis 11:31
(Arkansas) AR	Yell County	Corinth	Corinth	Acts 18:1
(Arkansas) AR	Faulkner County	Damascus	Damascus	Genesis 14:15
(Arkansas) AR	Craighead County	Egypt	Egypt	Genesis 12:10
(Arkansas) AR	Jefferson County	Gethsemane	Gethsemane	Matthew 26:36
(Arkansas) AR	Washington County	Goshen	Goshen	Genesis 45:10
(Arkansas) AR	Clark County	Hebron	Hebron	Genesis 13:18
(Arkansas) AR	Crittenden County	Jericho	Jericho	Numbers 22:1
(Arkansas) AR	Conway County	Jerusalem	Jerusalem	Joshua 10:1
(Arkansas) AR	Baxter County	Jordan	Jordan	Genesis 13:10
(Arkansas) AR	Sevier County	Lebanon	Lebanon	Deuteronomy 1:7
(Arkansas) AR	Newton County	Mt. Judea	Judea	Ezra 5:8
(Arkansas) AR	Yell County	Mt. Nebo	Mt. Nebo	Numbers 32:3
(Arkansas) AR	Izard County	Mount Olive	Mount of Olives	2 Samuel 15:30
(Arkansas) AR	Perry County	Nimrod	Nimrod	Micah 5:6
(Arkansas) AR	St. Francis County	Palestine	Palestine	Joel 3:4
(Arkansas) AR	Fulton County	Salem	Salem	Genesis 14:18
(Arkansas) AR	Ouachita County	Salem	Salem	Genesis 14:18
(Arkansas) AR	Pike County	Salem	Salem	Genesis 14:18
(Arkansas) AR	Saline County	Salem	Salem	Genesis 14:18
(Arkansas) AR	Columbia County	Shiloh	Shiloh	Joshua 18:1
(Arkansas) AR	Howard County	Shiloh	Shiloh	Joshua 18:1
(Arkansas) AR	Lafayette County	Shiloh	Shiloh	Joshua 18:1
(Arkansas) AR	Pope County	Shiloh	Shiloh	Joshua 18:1
(Arkansas) AR	Benton County	Siloam Springs	Siloam	Luke 13:4
(Arkansas) AR	Pope County	Smyrna	Smyrna	Revelation 1:11
(Arkansas) AR	Izard County	Zion	Zion	2 Samuel 5:7
(British Columbia) BC	Vancouver	Jericho Beach	Jericho	Numbers 22:1
(California) CA	Contra Costa County	Antioch	Antioch	Acts 6:5
(California) CA	Monterey County	Carmel-by-the-sea	Carmel	Joshua 12:22
(Colorado) CO	Pueblo County	Beulah	Beulah	Isaiah 62:4
(Connecticut) CT	New Haven County	Bethany	Bethany	Matthew 21:7
(Connecticut) CT	Fairfield County	Bethel	Bethel	Genesis 12:8
(Connecticut) CT	Litchfield County	Bethlehem	Bethlehem	Genesis 35:19
(Connecticut) CT	New London County	Bozrah	Bozrah	Genesis 36:33
(Connecticut) CT	Litchfield County	Canaan	Canaan	Genesis 9:18
(Connecticut) CT	Litchfield County	Goshen	Goshen	Genesis 45:10
(Connecticut) CT	Tolland County	Hebron	Hebron	Genesis 13:18
(Connecticut) CT	New London County	Lebanon	Lebanon	Deuteronomy 1:7
(Connecticut) CT	Fairfield County	New Canaan	Canaan	Genesis 9:18
(Connecticut) CT	New London County	Salem	Salem	Genesis 14:18
(Connecticut) CT	Litchfield County	Sharon	Sharon	1 Chronicles 5:16
(Delaware) DE	Sussex County	Bethany Beach	Bethany	Matthew 21:7
(Delaware) DE	Sussex County	Bethel	Bethel	Genesis 12:8
(Delaware) DE	Sussex County	Rehoboth Beach	Rehoboth	Genesis 26:22
(Florida) FL	Volusia County	New Smyrna Beach	Smyrna	Revelation 2:8
(Georgia (U.S. state)) GA	Clarke County	Athens	Athens	Acts 17:15
(Georgia (U.S. state)) GA	Barrow County	Bethlehem	Bethlehem	Genesis 35:19
(Georgia (U.S. state)) GA	Richmond County	Hephzibah	Hephzibah	2 Kings 21:1
(Georgia (U.S. state)) GA	Carroll County	Mount Zion	Zion	2 Samuel 5:7
(Georgia (U.S. state)) GA	Floyd County	Rome	Rome	Acts 2:10
(Georgia (U.S. state)) GA	Upson County	Salem	Salem	Genesis 14:18
(Georgia (U.S. state)) GA	Cobb County	Smyrna	Smyrna	Revelation 2:8
(Illinois) IL	Menard County	Athens	Athens	Acts 17:15
(Illinois) IL	Moultrie County	Bethany	Bethany	Matthew 21:7
(Illinois) IL	McHenry County	Hebron	Hebron	Genesis 13:18
(Illinois) IL	St. Clair County	Lebanon	Lebanon	Deuteronomy 1:7
(Illinois) IL	Macon County	Mount Zion	Zion	2 Samuel 5:7
(Illinois) IL	Peoria County	Rome	Rome	Acts 2:10
(Illinois) IL	Marion County	Salem	Salem	Genesis 14:18
(Illinois) IL	Lake County	Zion	Zion	2 Samuel 5:7
(Indiana) IN	Elkhart County	Goshen	Goshen	Genesis 45:10
(Indiana) IN	Porter County	Hebron	Hebron	Genesis 13:18
(Indiana) IN	Sullivan County	Jericho	Jericho	Numbers 22:1
(Indiana) IN	Boone County	Lebanon	Lebanon	Deuteronomy 1:7
(Indiana) IN	Noble County	Rome City	Rome	Acts 2:10
(Indiana) IN	Washington County	Salem	Salem	Genesis 14:18
(Iowa) IA	Fayette County	Illyria Township	Illyria	Romans 15:19
(Iowa) IA	Henry County	Rome	Rome	Acts 2:10
(Iowa) IA	Henry County	Salem	Salem	Genesis 14:18
(Kansas) KS	Dickinson County	Abilene	Abilene	Luke 3:1
(Kansas) KS	Smith County	Lebanon	Lebanon	Deuteronomy 1:7
(Kentucky) KY	Boone County	Hebron	Hebron	Genesis 13:18
(Kentucky) KY	Marion County	Lebanon	Lebanon	Deuteronomy 1:7
(Kentucky) KY	Robertson County	Mount Olivet	Mount of Olives	Zechariah 14:4
(Kentucky) KY	Livingstone County	Salem	Salem	Genesis 14:18
(Louisiana) LA	Claiborne Parish	Athens	Athens	Acts 17:15
(Maine) ME	Somerset County	Athens	Athens	Acts 17:15
(Maine) ME	Oxford County	Bethel	Bethel	Genesis 12:8
(Maine) ME	Somerset County	Canaan	Canaan	Genesis 9:18
(Maine) ME	Oxford County	Gilead	Gilead	Genesis 31:21
(Maine) ME	Oxford County	Hebron	Hebron	Genesis 13:18
(Maine) ME	York County	Lebanon	Lebanon	Deuteronomy 1:7
(Maine) ME	Aroostook County	Mars Hill	Areopagus	Acts 17:22
(Maine) ME	Kennebec County	Rome	Rome	Acts 2:10
(Maryland) MD	Montgomery County	Damascus	Damascus	Genesis 14:15
(Maryland) MD	Wicomico County	Hebron	Hebron	Genesis 13:18
(Maryland) MD	Harford County	Joppatowne	Jaffa	Joshua 19:46
(Massachusetts) MA	Hampshire County	Goshen	Goshen	Genesis 45:10
(Massachusetts) MA	Franklin County	New Salem	Salem	Genesis 14:18
(Massachusetts) MA	Bristol County	Rehoboth	Rehoboth	Genesis 26:22
(Massachusetts) MA	Essex County	Salem	Salem	Genesis 14:18
(Massachusetts) MA	Norfolk County	Sharon	Sharon	1 Chronicles 5:16
(Michigan) MI	Calhoun County	Athens	Athens	Acts 17:15
(Michigan) MI	Benzie County	Beulah	Beulah	Isaiah 62:4
(Michigan) MI	Branch County	Gilead Township	Gilead	Genesis 31:21
(Minnesota) MN	Anoka County	Bethel	Bethel	Genesis 12:8
(Minnesota) MN	Anoka County	East Bethel	Bethel	Genesis 12:8
(Minnesota) MN	Stearns County	Zion	Zion	2 Samuel 5:7
(Mississippi) MS	Alcorn County	Corinth	Corinth	Revelation 1:11
(Mississippi) MS	Neshoba County	Philadelphia	Philadelphia	Revelation 1:11
(Missouri) MO	Harrison County	Bethany	Bethany	Matthew 21:7
(Missouri) MO	Shelby County	Bethel	Bethel	Genesis 12:8
(Missouri) MO	Cedar County	Jerico Springs	Jericho	Numbers 22:1
(Missouri) MO	Laclede County	Lebanon	Lebanon	Deuteronomy 1:7
(Missouri) MO	Harrison County	Mount Moriah	Moriah	Genesis 22:2
(Missouri) MO	Dent County	Salem	Salem	Genesis 14:18
(Nebraska) NE	Thayer County	Gilead	Gilead	Genesis 31:21
(Nebraska) NE	Thayer County	Hebron	Hebron	Genesis 13:18
(Nebraska) NE	Richardson County	Salem	Salem	Genesis 14:18
(New Brunswick) NB	Queens County	Damascus	Damascus	Genesis 14:15
(New Brunswick) NB	Westmorland County	Jericho	Jericho	Numbers 22:1
(New Brunswick) NB	Albert County	Hebron	Hebron	Genesis 13:18
(Newfoundland and Labrador) NL	Newfoundland	Mount Moriah	Moriah	Genesis 22:2
(New Hampshire) NH	Grafton County	Bethlehem	Bethlehem	Genesis 35:19
(New Hampshire) NH	Grafton County	Canaan	Canaan	Genesis 9:18
(New Hampshire) NH	Grafton County	Hebron	Hebron	Genesis 13:18
(New Hampshire) NH	Grafton County	Lebanon	Lebanon	Deuteronomy 1:7
(New Hampshire) NH	Rockingham County	Salem	Salem	Genesis 14:18
(New Jersey) NJ	Hunterdon County	Bethlehem Township	Bethlehem	Genesis 35:19
(New Jersey) NJ	Cape May County	Goshen	Goshen	Genesis 45:10
(New Jersey) NJ	Hunterdon County	Lebanon	Lebanon	Deuteronomy 1:7
(New Jersey) NJ	Atlantic County	Mizpah	Mizpah	Genesis 31:49
(New Jersey) NJ	Camden County	Mount Ephraim	Mount Ephraim	Joshua 19:50
(New Jersey) NJ	Morris County	Mount Olive	Mount of Olives	Zechariah 14:4
(New Jersey) NJ	Salem County	Salem	Salem	Genesis 14:18
(New Jersey) NJ	Somerset County	Zarepath	Sarepta	1 Kings 17:9
(New Mexico) NM	Valencia County	Belen	Bethlehem	Genesis 35:19
(New Mexico) NM	McKinley County	Rehoboth	Rehoboth	Genesis 26:22
(New Mexico) NM	Doña Ana County	Salem	Salem	Genesis 14:18
(New York (state)) NY	Greene County	Athens	Athens	Acts 17:15
(New York (state)) NY	Suffolk County	Babylon	Babylon	Genesis 11:9
(New York (state)) NY	Genesee County	Bethany	Bethany	Matthew 21:7
(New York (state)) NY	Sullivan County	Bethel	Bethel	Genesis 12:8
(New York (state)) NY	Albany County	Bethlehem	Bethlehem	Genesis 35:19
(New York (state)) NY	Columbia County	Canaan	Canaan	Genesis 9:18
(New York (state)) NY	Fulton County	Ephratah	Ephrath	Genesis 35:19
(New York (state)) NY	Orange County	Goshen	Goshen	Genesis 45:10
(New York (state)) NY	Washington County	Hebron	Hebron	Genesis 13:18
(New York (state)) NY	Nassau County	Jericho	Jericho	Numbers 22:1
(New York (state)) NY	Yates County	Jerusalem	Jerusalem	Joshua 10:1
(New York (state)) NY	Madison County	Lebanon	Lebanon	Deuteronomy 1:7
(New York (state)) NY	Saratoga County	Malta	Malta	Acts 28:1
(New York (state)) NY	Essex County	Moriah	Moriah	Genesis 22:2
(New York (state)) NY	Oneida County	Rome	Rome	Acts 2:10
(New York (state)) NY	Washington County	Salem	Salem	Genesis 14:18
(North Carolina) NC	Pitt County	Bethel	Bethel	Genesis 12:8
(North Carolina) NC	Alexander County	Bethlehem	Bethlehem	Genesis 35:19
(North Carolina) NC	Madison County	Mars Hill	Areopagus	Acts 17:22
(North Carolina) NC	Montgomery County	Mount Gilead	Gilead	Genesis 31:21
(North Carolina) NC	Wayne County & Duplin County	Mount Olive	Mount of Olives	Zechariah 14:4
(North Carolina) NC	McDowell County	Nebo	Nebo	Numbers 32:3
(North Carolina) NC	Burke County	Salem	Salem	Genesis 14:18
(North Carolina) NC	Forsyth County	Winston-Salem	Salem	Genesis 14:18
(North Dakota) ND	Morton County	Hebron	Hebron	Genesis 13:18
(Ohio) OH	Athens County	Athens	Athens	Acts 17:15
(Ohio) OH	Cuyahoga County	Berea	Veria	Acts 17:10
(Ohio) OH	Clermont County	Bethel	Bethel	Genesis 12:8
(Ohio) OH	Morrow County	Mount Gilead	Gilead	Genesis 31:21
(Ohio) OH	Licking County	Hebron	Hebron	Genesis 13:18
(Ohio) OH	Monroe County	Jerusalem	Jerusalem	Joshua 10:1
(Ohio) OH	Warren County	Lebanon	Lebanon	Deuteronomy 1:7
(Ohio) OH	Adams County	Rome	Rome	Acts 2:10
(Ohio) OH	Columbiana County & Mahoning County	Salem	Salem	Genesis 14:18
(Oklahoma) OK	Oklahoma County	Bethany	Bethany	Matthew 21:7
(Oklahoma) OK	Pottawatomie County	Bethel Acres	Bethel	Genesis 12:8
(Oklahoma) OK	Marshall County	Lebanon	Lebanon	Deuteronomy 1:7
(Ontario) ON	Leeds and Grenville United Counties	Athens	Athens	Acts 17:15
(Ontario) ON	Kawartha Lakes	Bethany	Bethany	Matthew 21:7
(Ontario) ON	Wellington County	Salem	Salem	Genesis 14:18
(Oregon) OR	Washington County	Bethany	Bethany	Matthew 21:7
(Oregon) OR	Clackamas County	Damascus	Damascus	Genesis 14:15
(Oregon) OR	Linn County	Lebanon	Lebanon	Deuteronomy 1:7
(Oregon) OR	Marion County	Salem	Salem	Genesis 14:18
(Pennsylvania) PA	Lehigh County & Northampton County	Bethlehem	Bethlehem	Genesis 35:19
(Pennsylvania) PA	Northumberland County	Dalmatia	Dalmatia	2 Timothy 4:10
(Pennsylvania) PA	Lehigh County	Emmaus	Emmaus	Luke 24:13
(Pennsylvania) PA	Lancaster County	Ephrata	Ephrath	Genesis 35:19
(Pennsylvania) PA	Lebanon County	Lebanon	Lebanon	Deuteronomy 1:7
(Pennsylvania) PA	Northampton County	Nazareth	Nazareth	Matthew 2:23
(Pennsylvania) PA	Philadelphia County	Philadelphia	Philadelphia	Revelation 1:11
(Pennsylvania) PA	Bradford County	Rome	Rome	Acts 2:10
(Pennsylvania) PA	Westmoreland County	Sardis	Murrysville, Pennsylvania	Revelation 3:1
(Pennsylvania) PA	Centre County	Zion	Zion	2 Samuel 5:7
(Prince Edward Island) PE	Prince County	Hebron	Hebron	Genesis 13:18
(Quebec) QC	Montérégie	Béthanie	Bethany	Matthew 21:7
(Rhode Island) RI	Washington County	Galilee	Galilee	Joshua 20:7
(Rhode Island) RI	Washington County	Jerusalem	Jerusalem	Joshua 10:1
(Saskatchewan) SK	Rural Municipality of Orkney No. 244	Ebenezer	Eben-Ezer	1 Samuel 4:1
(South Carolina) SC	Greenwood County	Promised Land	Promised Land	Genesis 9:18
(South Carolina) SC	Oconee County	Salem	Salem	Genesis 14:18
(South Dakota) SD	McCook County	Salem	Salem	Genesis 14:18
(Tennessee) TN	McMinn County	Athens	Athens	Acts 17:15
(Tennessee) TN	Wilson County	Lebanon	Lebanon	Deuteronomy 1:7
(Tennessee) TN	Shelby County	Memphis	Memphis	Hosea 9:6
(Tennessee) TN	Loudon County	Philadelphia	Philadelphia	Revelation 1:11
(Texas) TX	Taylor County & Jones County	Abilene	Abilene	Luke 3:1
(Texas) TX	Henderson County	Athens	Athens	Acts 17:15
(Texas) TX	Collin County & Denton County	Hebron	Hebron	Genesis 13:18
(Texas) TX	Collin County	Lebanon	Lebanon	Deuteronomy 1:7
(Texas) TX	Hall County	Memphis	Memphis	Hosea 9:6
(Texas) TX	Castro County	Nazareth	Nazareth	Matthew 2:23
(Texas) TX	Wise County	Rhome	Rome	Acts 2:10
(Utah) UT	Sanpete County	Ephraim	Mount Ephraim	Joshua 19:50
(Utah) UT	Grand County	Moab	Moab	Genesis 19:37
(Utah) UT	Utah County	Salem	Salem	Genesis 14:18
(Utah) UT	Salt Lake County	South Jordan	Jordan River	Genesis 13:10
(Utah) UT	Salt Lake County	West Jordan	Jordan River	Genesis 13:10
(Vermont) VT	Windham County	Athens	Athens	Acts 17:15
(Vermont) VT	Essex County	Canaan	Canaan	Genesis 9:18
(Vermont) VT	Orange County	Corinth	Corinth	Acts 18:1
(Vermont) VT	Chittenden County	Jericho	Jericho	Numbers 22:1
(Virginia) VA	Washington County	Damascus	Damascus	Genesis 14:15
(Virginia) VA	Loudoun County	Mount Gilead	Gilead	Genesis 31:21
(Virginia) VA	Russell County	Lebanon	Lebanon	Deuteronomy 1:7
(Virginia) VA	Roanoke County	Salem	Salem	Genesis 14:18
(Washington (state)) WA	Grant County	Ephrata	Ephrath	Genesis 35:19
(Washington (state)) WA	Whitman County	Tekoa	Tekoa	1 Chronicles 2:24
(West Virginia) WV	Mercer County	Athens	Athens	Acts 17:15
(West Virginia) WV	Brooke County	Bethany	Bethany	Matthew 21:7
(West Virginia) WV	Ohio County	Bethlehem	Bethlehem	Genesis 35:19
(West Virginia) WV	Tucker County	Canaan Valley	Canaan	Genesis 9:18
(West Virginia) WV	Harrison County	Salem	Salem	Genesis 14:18
(Wisconsin) WI	Marathon County	Athens	Athens	Acts 17:15
(Wisconsin) WI	Jefferson County	Hebron	Hebron	Genesis 13:18
(Wisconsin) WI	Dodge County	Lebanon	Lebanon	Deuteronomy 1:7
(Wisconsin) WI	Waupaca County	Lebanon	Lebanon	Deuteronomy 1:7
(Wisconsin) WI	Adams County	Rome	Rome	Acts 2:10
(Wisconsin) WI	Jefferson County	Rome	Rome	Acts 2:10

== United States extended list ==
=== Antioch ===
Antioch on the Orontes (Greek Ἀντιόχεια ἡ ἐπὶ Ὀρόντου Antiocheia hē epi Orontou) was a city on the eastern side of the Orontes River. It was visited by Saint Peter and Saint Paul.

- Antioch, Arkansas
- Antioch, California
- Antioch, Illinois
- Antioch, Ohio
- Antioch, Tennessee

=== Athens ===
- Athens, Alabama
- Athens, Arkansas
- Athens, Georgia
- Athens, Ohio
- Athens, Tennessee
- Athens, Pennsylvania
- Athens, Texas

=== Bethabara ===
Bethabara (Aramaic בית עברה Bēth‛ăbhārāh) is a site where John the Baptist baptized.

- Bethabara Historic District, North Carolina

=== Bethany ===
Bethany (Aramaic: בית עניא, Beth Anya, "house of the figs") was a village near Jerusalem and residence of the siblings Martha, Mary and Lazarus, and also Simon the Leper.

- Bethany, Connecticut
- Bethany Beach, Delaware
- Bethany, Nebraska
- Bethany, Ohio
- Bethany, Oklahoma
- Bethany, Oregon
- Bethany, Pennsylvania
- Bethany, West Virginia

=== Bethel ===
Bethel (Hebrew: בֵית אֵל bet el, "House of God") was a border town between Benjamin and Ephraim.

- Bethel, Alaska
  - Bethel Census Area, Alaska
- Bethel, Arkansas (disambiguation)
- Bethel, Connecticut
- Bethel, Maine
- Bethel, Minnesota
- East Bethel, Minnesota
- Bethel, Missouri
- Bethel, Ohio
- Bethel, Vermont
- Bethel Heights, Arkansas
- Bethel Island, California
- Bethel Springs, Tennessee
- Bethel Township, Lebanon County, Pennsylvania

=== Bethesda ===
The Pool of Bethesda (Aramaic בית חסדא Beth ḥesda "House of Mercy") is a healing pool in Jerusalem.

- Bethesda, Maryland
- Bethesda Fountain in New York's Central Park
- Bethesda Orphanage of Savannah, Georgia

=== Bethlehem ===
Bethlehem (בֵית לֶחֶם Beit Lehem, Literally: "House of the bread'") was a town in the hill country of Judah and the birthplace of Jesus (according to Mark and Luke) and David, as well as the place of death of Rachel.

- Bethlehem, Arkansas
- Bethlehem, Connecticut
- Bethlehem, Georgia
- Bethlehem, New Hampshire
- Bethlehem Township, New Jersey
- Bethlehem, New York
- Bethlehem, North Carolina
- Bethlehem, Pennsylvania
- Bethlehem, West Virginia

=== Bethpage ===
Bethpage or Bethphage (Aramaic בית פגי "House of unripe figs") is a town where Jesus asked the disciples to find a donkey and colt for his Entry into Jerusalem.

- Bethpage, New York

=== Beulah ===
- Buelah, Arkansas

=== Canaan ===
Canaan (Phoenician: Kanaʻn; Hebrew: כְּנָעַן Kənáʻan) was a region conquered by the Israelites as the Promised Land.

- Canaan, Arkansas
- Canaan, Connecticut
- Canaan, New Hampshire
- Canaan Valley, West Virginia

=== Carmel ===
Mount Carmel (Hebrew הַר הַכַּרְמֶל, Har HaKarmel, "God's vineyard") was a sacred mountain where Elijah defeated the prophets of a Ba'al in a contest. Carmel was a town in Judea mentioned as the residence of Nabal and Abigail.

- Mount Carmel, Iowa
- Carmel, Maine
- Mount Carmel, Pennsylvania
- Carmel, Indiana
- Carmel-by-the-Sea, California
- Mount Carmel, West Virginia
- Mount Carmel, Ohio

=== Corinth ===
Corinth (Greek: Κόρινθος, Kórinthos) was a city on the Isthmus of Corinth. Paul of Tarsus lived there for 18 months, and also wrote two epistles to the Corinthians.

- Corinth, Arkansas
- Corinth (town), New York
- Corinth, Maine
- Corinth, Kentucky
- Corinth, Mississippi

=== Damascus ===
Damascus is a Syrian city. The Conversion of Paul the Apostle took place on the road to Damascus.

- Damascus, Arkansas
- Damascus, Georgia
- Damascus, Maryland
- Damascus, Ohio
- Damascus, Township in, Pennsylvania

=== Emmaus ===
Emmaus (Greek: Ἐμμαούς, Emmaous; Hebrew: חמת Hammat, "warm spring") was a town near Jerusalem. Jesus appeared to two of the Apostles on the road between Jerusalem and Emmaus.

- Emmaus, Pennsylvania

=== Ephesus ===
Ephesus (Greek: Ἔφεσος Ephesos) was a Greek city on the west coast of Anatolia. Paul of Tarsus lived there for several years, and also wrote an Epistle to the Ephesians. One of the Seven churches of Asia to whom the first part of the Book of Revelation is addressed (Revelation 2:1–7). The author praises the Ephesians for their perseverance and discernment, but admonishes them for backsliding from a more praiseworthy condition.

- Ephesus, Georgia

=== Gethsemane ===
- Gethsemane, Arkansas

=== Goshen ===
The Land of Goshen (Hebrew גֹּשֶׁן Gōšen) was a place settled by the sons of Jacob.

- Goshen, Arkansas
- Goshen, Alabama
- Goshen, Connecticut
- Goshen, Indiana
- Goshen, Kentucky
- Goshen, Massachusetts
- Goshen, Missouri
- Goshen, New Jersey
- Goshen (town), New York
  - Goshen (village), New York
- Goshen, Oregon
- Goshen County, Wyoming
- Goshen Township, Hardin County, Ohio
- Goshen Township, Tuscarawas County, Ohio
- Goshen Settlement, a historical area in Illinois

=== Hebron ===
Hebron (Hebrew חֶבְרוֹן Ḥeḇrôn, "friend") was a city in Canaan mentioned in several parts of the Old Testament.

- Hebron, Arkansas
- Hebron, Connecticut
- Hebron, Indiana
- Hebron, Maryland
- Hebron, Nebraska
- Hebron, New Hampshire
- Hebron, New York
- Hebron, North Dakota
- Hebron, Texas
- Hebron, Pleasants County, West Virginia
- Hebron, Ohio
- Hebron, Kentucky

=== Hell ===
Hell is mentioned 54 times in the King James Version of the bible, representing a place of torment and punishment in the afterlife.

- Half Hell, North Carolina
- Hell, Michigan

=== Jericho ===
Jericho (Hebrew יְרִיחוֹ Yəriḥo, "fragrant" or "Moon") was a city conquered in the battle of Jericho by Joshua and the Children of Israel.

- Jericho, Arkansas
- Jericho, New York
- Jerico Springs, Missouri

=== Jerusalem ===
Jerusalem (Hebrew יְרוּשָׁלַיִם Yerushaláyim, "Abode of Peace" or "Abode of Shalim") was the traditional capital city of the Israelites and site of the Temple.

- Jerusalem, Arkansas
- Jerusalem, New York
- Jerusalem, Ohio
- Jerusalem, Virginia, now Courtland, Virginia

=== Jordan ===
The Jordan River (Hebrew: נהר הירדן Nehar Hayarden) forms the eastern border of Palestine and was the site of the baptism of Jesus.

==== Towns ====
- Jordan, Arkansas
- Jordan, Iowa
- Jordan, Minnesota, a city in Scott County
- South Jordan, Utah
- West Jordan, Utah

==== Rivers ====
- Ohio River, called the "River Jordan" by slaves escaping to freedom in the North before and during the American Civil War
- Jordan River (Utah)
- Jordan River - East Jordan, Michigan

=== Judea ===
- Where most of the Bible stories took place in what is today Israel
- Mt. Judea, Arkansas

=== Lebanon ===
Lebanon (Semitic root L-B-N, "white") is a land to the north of the current state of Israel (Biblically; Canaan) and is mentioned 70 times in the Bible.

- Lebanon, Arkansas
- Lebanon, Connecticut
- Lebanon, Indiana
- Lebanon, Kentucky
- Lebanon, Maine
- Lebanon, New Hampshire
- Lebanon, New Jersey
- Lebanon, Ohio
- Lebanon, Pennsylvania
- Lebanon, Tennessee
- Lebanon, Texas

=== Mount Hermon ===
Mount Hermon (Hebrew הר חרמון Har Hermon) was the northern limit of the Promised Land and possible site of the Transfiguration.

- Mount Hermon, California

=== Moab ===
Moab (Hebrew: מוֹאָב Môʼāḇ, "seed of father") was a strip of land on the eastern shore of the Dead Sea. It was founded by a son of Lot.

- Moab, Utah

=== Mount Olivet ===
The Mount of Olives or Mount Olivet (Hebrew: הַר הַזֵּיתִים Har HaZeitim) is a mountain east of Jerusalem, most notable as the site of the Olivet Discourse and the Ascension of Jesus.

- Mount Olive, Arkansas (disambiguation)
- Mount Olive, New Jersey
- Mount Olivet Cemetery, many throughout the US

=== Mount Nebo ===
- Mt. Nebo, Arkansas
- Nebo, North Carolina
- Mount Nebo, Nicholas County, West Virginia
- Mount Nebo, Pennsylvania
- Mount Nebo, Utah

=== Nazareth ===
Nazareth (Hebrew נָצְרַת Natzrat / Natzeret) was a village in Galilee which was the childhood home of Jesus.

- Nazareth, Pennsylvania
- Nazareth, Texas
- Nazareth, Kentucky

=== Nimrod ===
- Nimrod, Arkansas
- Nimrod, Minnesota
- Nimrod, Oregon

=== Nineveh ===
Nineveh (Hebrew: נינוה Nīnewē) was an Assyrian city on the eastern bank of the Tigris. It is mentioned in several parts of the Bible.

- Nineveh, New York, a hamlet
- Nineveh, Pennsylvania, an unincorporated community
- Nineveh, Missouri, an unincorporated community
- Nineveh Township, Johnson County, Indiana
- Nineveh, Virginia, an unincorporated community

=== Ophir ===
Ophir (Hebrew אוֹפִיר ʼÔp̄îr) is mentioned in the Bible as a source of King Solomon's wealth.

- Ophir, California
- Ophir, Colorado
- Ophir City, California

=== Palestine ===
Palestine is a narrow region along the Mediterranean Sea from Northern Sinai until Caesarea.

- Palestine, Arkansas
- Palestine, Illinois
- Palestine, Texas
- Palestine, Kosciusko County, Indiana
- East Palestine, Ohio
- Palestine, Wirt County, West Virginia

=== Patmos ===
Patmos (Greek: Πάτμος) was the residence of John of Patmos, author of the Book of Revelation.

- Patmos, Arkansas

=== Rehoboth ===
Rehoboth (Hebrew רְחוֹבוֹת Reḥovot, "broad place") is the name of three places in the Bible. In Genesis 26:22, It signifies vacant land in the Land of Canaan where Isaac is permitted to dig a well without being ousted by the Philistines.

- Rehoboth, Massachusetts
- Rehoboth Beach, Delaware
- Rehoboth, New Mexico
- Rehoboth, Perry County, Ohio
- Rehoboth, Seneca County, Ohio

=== Salem ===
Salem (sha'lem) [Cana'anite patron god; son of 'Ashtar] is a city mentioned in the biblical Old Testament. It was the royal city of Melchizedek and traditionally identified with Jerusalem.

- Salem, Alabama
- Salem, Arkansas
  - Salem, Fulton County, Arkansas
  - Salem, Saline County, Arkansas
- Salem, Connecticut
- Salem, Florida
- Salem, Georgia
- Salem, Illinois
- Salem, Indiana
  - Salem, Indiana in Washington County
  - Salem, Adams County, Indiana
  - Salem, Jay County, Indiana
- Salem, Iowa
- Salem, Kentucky
- Salem, Massachusetts
  - Salem Harbor
  - Salem Channel, a part of the Salem Sound
  - Salem (MBTA station)
- Salem, Michigan, renamed Burnips
- Salem Township, Washtenaw County, Michigan
- Salem, Missouri
- Salem, Nebraska
- Salem, New Hampshire
- Salem, New Jersey
  - Salem Nuclear Power Plant
  - Salem River, a tributary of the Delaware River
- Salem, New Mexico
- Salem, New York
  - Salem (town), New York
    - Salem (village), New York
  - Salem, an earlier name of Brocton, New York
- Salem, North Carolina
- Winston-Salem, North Carolina
  - Old Salem, a history museum in Winston-Salem
- Salem, Ohio
- Salem, Oklahoma
- Salem, Oregon, the state capital
  - Salem Metropolitan Statistical Area
  - Salem (Amtrak station), a railroad station
- Salem, South Carolina
- Salem, South Dakota
- Salem, Texas, in Newton County
- Salem, Utah
- Salem, Virginia, an independent city adjacent to Roanoke
- Salem, Virginia Beach, Virginia, a neighborhood
- Salem, West Virginia
- Salem, Wisconsin
  - Salem, Kenosha County, Wisconsin, a town in Kenosha County
  - Salem (community), Kenosha County, Wisconsin, an unincorporated community in Kenosha County
  - Salem, Pierce County, Wisconsin, a town in Pierce County
  - Salem (community), Pierce County, Wisconsin, an unincorporated community in Pierce County
  - Salem Oaks, Wisconsin, an unincorporated community in Kenosha County

=== Shiloh ===
Shiloh (Hebrew שילו Šîlô / שלו Šīlô / שלה Šīlōh) was an assembly place for the people of Israel where there was a sanctuary containing the Ark of the Covenant.

- Shiloh, Arkansas (disambiguation)
- Shiloh, Georgia
- Shiloh, Indiana
- Shiloh, Michigan, mostly abandoned
- Shiloh, Richland County, Ohio
- Shiloh, Hampshire County, West Virginia
- Shiloh, York County, Pennsylvania

=== Siloam ===
- Siloam Springs, Arkansas

=== Smyrna ===
One of the Seven churches of Asia to whom the first part of the Book of Revelation is addressed (Revelation 2:8–11). The author praises their fortitude in adversity.

- Smyrna, Arkansas (disambiguation)
- Smyrna, California
- Smyrna, Delaware
- New Smyrna Beach, Florida
- Smyrna, Georgia
- Smyrna, Jefferson County, Indiana
- Smyrna, Louisville, Kentucky, a neighborhood
- Smyrna, Maine
- Smyrna, Michigan
- Smyrna, Nebraska
- Smyrna (town), New York
- Smyrna (village), New York
- Smyrna, North Carolina
- Smyrna, South Carolina
- Smyrna, Tennessee
- Smyrna, Washington

=== Tyre ===
Tyre (Hebrew צור Ṣōr) is a city in the Lebanon mentioned many times in the Old Testament.

- Tyre, New York

=== Mount Zion ===
Mount Zion (Hebrew הר צִיּוֹן Har Tsion) is an elevation west of the Mount of Olives outside Jerusalem and was used as a name for the Temple Mount or the City of David.

- Zion, Arkansas
- Zion, Illinois
- Zion National Park

== See also ==
- List of Mormon place names
