= Smyrna Township =

Smyrna Township may refer to the following places in the United States:

- Smyrna Township, Pope County, Arkansas
- Smyrna Township, Jefferson County, Indiana
- Smyrna Township, Carteret County, North Carolina
- Smyrna Township, Robeson County, North Carolina

See also

- Smyrna (disambiguation)
