= Smyrna (disambiguation) =

Smyrna is the former name of Izmir, Turkey.

Smyrna may also refer to:

== In Greek mythology ==
- Myrrha, also known as Smyrna, mother of Adonis
- Smyrna (Amazon), a mythical eponym of a quarter in Ephesus
- Smyrna (mythology), several women

== Historical figures ==
- Bion of Smyrna (c. 100 BC), Greek poet
- Chaka of Smyrna, 11th century Turkish emir
- Chrysostomos of Smyrna (Chrysostomos Kalafatis) (1867–1922), Greek Orthodox bishop of Izmir
- Hermippus of Smyrna (3rd century BC), Peripatetic philosopher
- Nymphidianus of Smyrna (4th century), Neoplatonist and sophist who lived in the time of the emperor Julian
- Theon of Smyrna (c. 70–c. 135), Greek philosopher

== Place names ==
- Myrina (Aeolis), called Smyrna in antiquity

=== United States ===
- Smyrna, Delaware, population 10,000.
- New Smyrna Beach, Florida
- Smyrna, Georgia, population 57,000.
- Smyrna, Jefferson County, Indiana, an unincorporated community also called Creswell.
- Smyrna, Louisville, Kentucky, a neighborhood.
- Smyrna, Maine
- Smyrna, Michigan, an unincorporated community in Otisco Township.
- Smyrna, Nebraska, an unincorporated community in Nuckolls County.
- Smyrna (town), New York
  - Smyrna (village), New York
- Smyrna, North Carolina, in Carteret County
- Smyrna, South Carolina
- Smyrna, Tennessee, population 50,000.
  - Smyrna Airport (Tennessee)
  - Smyrna High School (Tennessee)
- Smyrna, Washington, an unincorporated community in Grant County.

== Other uses ==
- SmY RNA, a family of small nuclear RNAs found in some species of nematode worms
- Smyrna (butterfly), a genus of brush-footed butterflies

== See also ==
- New Smyrna (disambiguation)
- Izmir (disambiguation)
- Nea Smyrni
- Burning of Smyrna
