= Springdale Public Schools =

School district in Arkansas

Springdale School District #50

Location
- Springdale, Arkansas Northwest Arkansas United States

District information
- Type: Public School District
- Motto: Teach Them All.
- Grades: Pre-K - 12
- Established: January 7, 1884
- Superintendent: Dr. Jared Cleveland
- Accreditation: AdvancED
- Schools: 30 (2018-2019)
- Budget: 197,560,340
- NCES District ID: 0512660

Students and staff
- Students: 23,085
- Teachers: 1,100
- Athletic conference: 7A

Other information
- Website: www.sdale.org

Springdale Public Schools (formally Springdale School District #50) is the public school district for students of primary and secondary education in Springdale, Arkansas and surrounding areas. The district contains three high schools, four junior highs, four middle schools, eighteen elementary schools, and a school of innovation. Established in 1884, the district and its schools are accredited by AdvancED. It is the state's largest school district, with more than 23,000 students.

The district is headquartered in the Old Springdale High School.

== History ==
=== Formation and early history ===
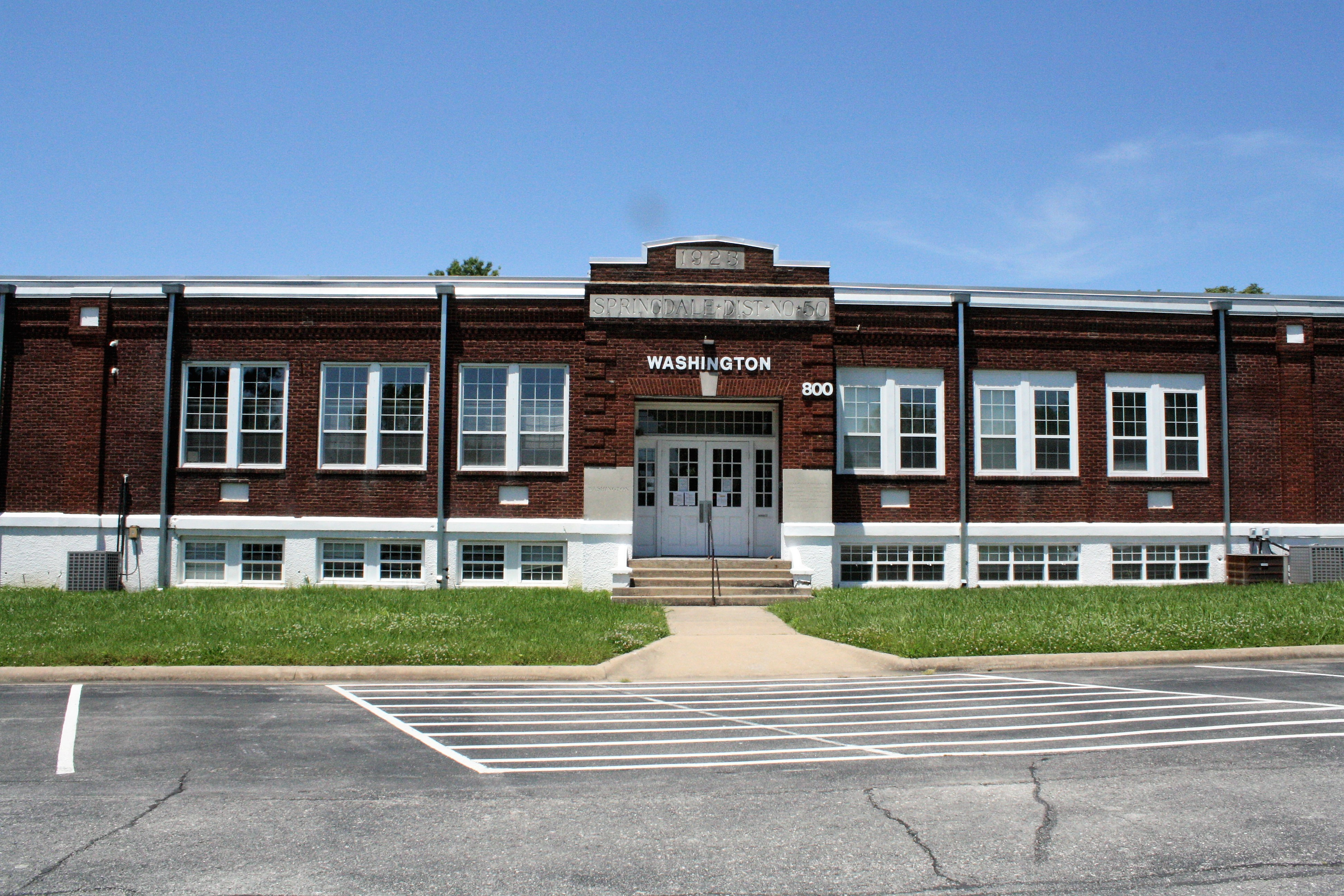
1923 Washington School

Beginning with log cabin schools in the area established by early settlers, an educational partnership among schools coalesced into Springdale School District #50 on January 7, 1884. When high school curriculum became required in 1947, Springdale adopted many small surrounding districts that did not offer high school, such as Accident School in Accident. The last such school consolidated into Springdale was Tontitown Elementary, which was closed after the 1986-87 school year.

=== Expansion, new high schools ===
On the heels of rapid growth in Northwest Arkansas and Springdale in the late 1990s and early 2000s, Springdale had reached capacity in many of its existing schools. Land for a second high school was purchased in 2002 on the west side of Springdale. This property was developed into Har-Ber High School and Hellstern Middle School, both opened in 2005.

Population growth continued and Springdale used 24 portable buildings to house an overflow of about 600 students for the 2005-06 school year as building continued. A "super complex" of four schools on nearby properties was proposed in the rapidly-growing southeast part of Springdale in 2006. In 2006, Har-Ber HS was projected to be at capacity by 2009.

== Service area ==
In Washington County it includes all portions of Springdale and Elm Springs in Washington County, Tontitown, and portions of Fayetteville, Goshen, and Johnson. In Benton County it includes most of that county's portions of Springdale (including the former municipality of Bethel Heights) as well as all of that county's portion of Elm Springs.

== Demographics ==
Circa 2014, the school system had about 2,000 Marshallese students. Circa 2009 this figure was 300 total.

== Schools ==
=== Secondary education ===
Springdale School District provides education programs for students in grades six through twelve in eleven facilities: High Schools

- Springdale High School—serving students in grades 10–12.
- Har-Ber High School—serving students in grades 10–12.
- Archer Learning Center—serving students in grades 8–12.
- Don Tyson School of Innovation—serving students in grades 6–12.

Junior High Schools—serving students in grades 8-9.

- Central Junior High School
- George Junior High School
- Lakeside Junior High School
- Southwest Junior High School

Middle Schools-–serving students in grades 6-7.

- J.O. Kelly Middle School
- Helen Tyson Middle School
- Hellstern Middle School
- Sonora Middle School

=== Elementary and early childhood education ===
Seventeen educational facilities comprise the district's elementary and early childhood programs:

Elementary Schools—serving students in grades K-5 (some with Pre-Kindergarten).

- Bayyari Elementary School
- Elmdale Elementary School
- George Elementary School
- Harp Elementary School
- Hunt Elementary School
- Jones Elementary School
- Knapp Elementary School
- Lee Elementary School - National Blue Ribbon School in 1996-97.
- Monitor Elementary School
- Parson Hills Elementary School - National Blue Ribbon School in 1993-94.
  - In 2012, 30% of the student body consisted of Marshallese people, as Springdale had the largest Marshallese community in the continental U.S. The school enacted a cultural education program and donated alarm clocks to Marshallese families to combat truancy issues among Marshallese.
- Jim Rollins Elementary School (Tontitown)
  - Jim Rollins Elementary School a.k.a. Jim D. Rollins School of Innovation, uses an open classroom instructional model from New Zealand. Planning for the school began circa 2018; In October 2020 the district began building the school, which opened in fall 2021, though with some construction left unfinished. The dedication occurred in 2022. The school was named after a person who served as the superintendent of the Springdale district.
- Shaw Elementary School
- Smith Elementary School - National Blue Ribbon School in 1987-88.
- Sonora Elementary School
- Turnbow Elementary School
- Tyson Elementary School
- Walker Elementary School - National Blue Ribbon School in 1996-97.
- Westwood Elementary School - National Blue Ribbon School in 1989-90.
- Young Elementary School

In 2012, the Gold Award of Distinction in the HealthierUS School Challenge that recognizes excellence in nutrition and physical activity by the Food and Nutrition Service of the U.S. Department of Agriculture was awarded to:

- George Elementary School
- Hunt Elementary School
- T.G. Smith Elementary School
- Westwood Elementary School
