= Johnson, Arkansas =

- City
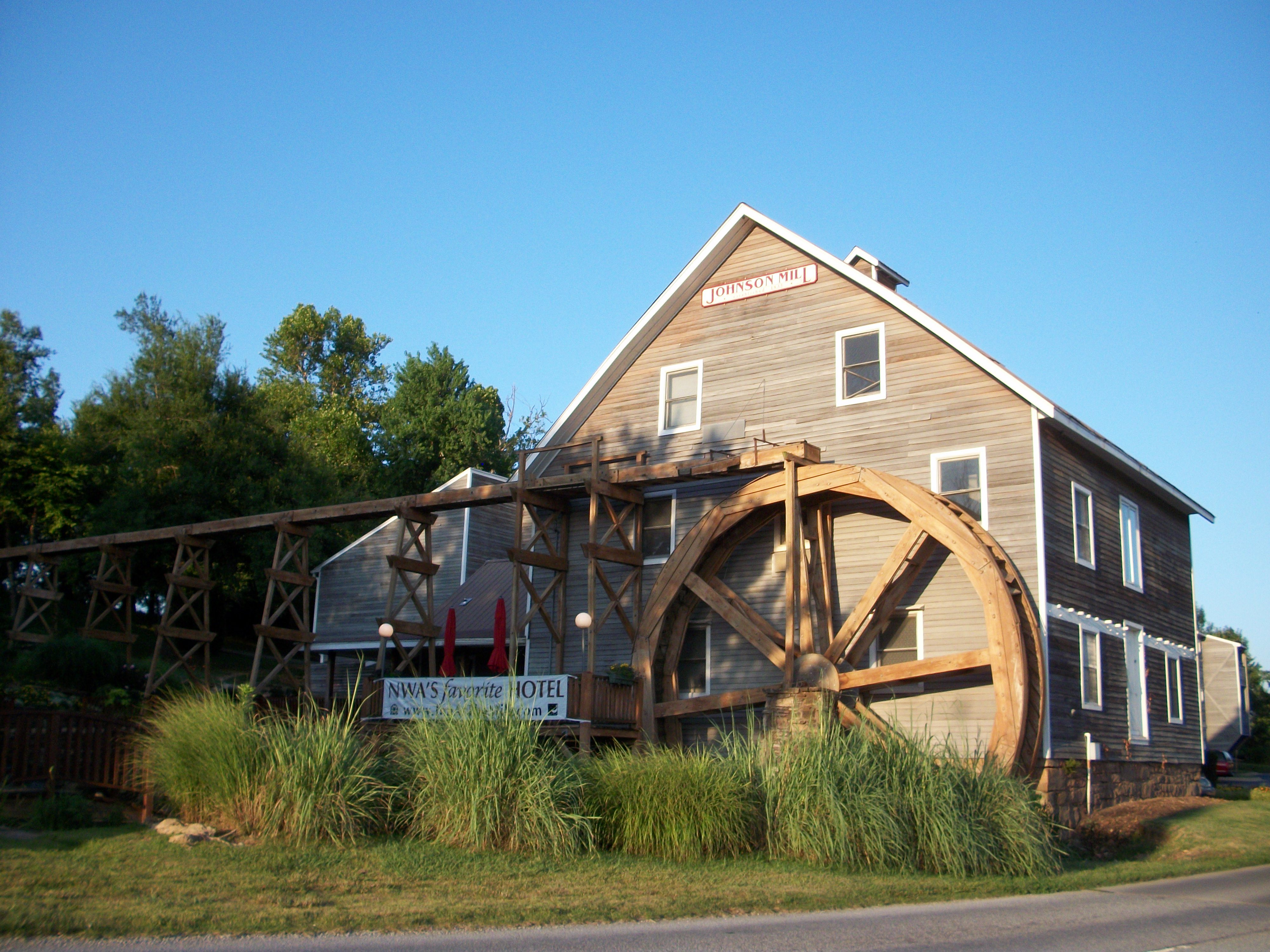
- The historic Johnson Mill

- Location of Johnson in Washington County, Arkansas.
- Coordinates: 36°07′58″N 94°10′32″W
- Country: United States
- State: Arkansas
- County: Washington
- Established: 1961

Area
  - City: 3.64 sq mi (9.44 km^{2})
  - Land: 3.61 sq mi (9.36 km^{2})
  - Water: 0.031 sq mi (0.08 km^{2})
- Elevation: 1,158 ft (353 m)

Population (2020)
  - City: 3,609
  - Estimate (2025): 3,684 ▲
  - Density: 999.0/sq mi (385.71/km^{2})
  - Metro: 546,725
- Time zone: UTC-6 (Central (CST))
  - Summer (DST): UTC-5 (CDT)
- ZIP code: 72762
- Area code: 479
- FIPS code: 05-35500
- GNIS feature ID: 2404807
- Website: cityofjohnson.com

Johnson is a city in Washington County, Arkansas, United States. The community is located in the Ozark Mountains and is surrounded by valleys and natural springs. Early settlers took advantage of these natural features and formed an economy based on mining lime, the Johnson Mill and trout. Although a post office was opened in the community in 1887, Johnson did not incorporate until it required the development of a city government to provide utility services in 1961. Located between Fayetteville and Springdale in the heart of the rapidly growing Northwest Arkansas metropolitan statistical area, Johnson has been experiencing a population and building boom in recent years. As of the 2020 census, Johnson had a population of 3,609.

== Geography ==
Johnson is located between Fayetteville and Springdale. The town is located off Exit 69 on I-49 in Northwest Arkansas.

According to the United States Census Bureau, the city has a total area of 3.1 square miles (8.0 km^{2}), all land.

== Demographics ==
Historical population
| Census | Pop. | Note | %± |
|---|---|---|---|
| 1970 | 274 | | — |
| 1980 | 519 | | 89.4% |
| 1990 | 599 | | 15.4% |
| 2000 | 2,319 | | 287.1% |
| 2010 | 3,353 | | 44.6% |
| 2020 | 3,609 | | 7.6% |
| 2025 (est.) | 3,684 | ▲ | 2.1% |

=== 2020 census ===
As of the 2020 census, Johnson had a population of 3,609. The median age was 35.4 years. 21.9% of residents were under the age of 18 and 12.1% of residents were 65 years of age or older. For every 100 females, there were 95.9 males, and for every 100 females age 18 and over, there were 93.2 males.

87.1% of residents lived in urban areas, while 12.9% lived in rural areas.

As of the 2020 census, there were 1,487 households and 902 families residing in the city. Of the households, 30.5% had children under the age of 18 living in them. Of all households, 47.8% were married-couple households, 17.4% were households with a male householder and no spouse or partner present, and 26.1% were households with a female householder and no spouse or partner present. About 26.9% of all households were made up of individuals, and 8.1% had someone living alone who was 65 years of age or older.

There were 1,595 housing units, of which 6.8% were vacant. The homeowner vacancy rate was 1.8% and the rental vacancy rate was 7.0%.

Johnson racial composition
| Race | Number | Percentage |
|---|---|---|
| White (non-Hispanic) | 2,572 | 71.27% |
| Black or African American (non-Hispanic) | 139 | 3.85% |
| Native American | 42 | 1.16% |
| Asian | 118 | 3.27% |
| Pacific Islander | 77 | 2.13% |
| Other/Mixed | 203 | 5.62% |
| Hispanic or Latino | 458 | 12.69% |

=== 2000 census ===
As of the census of 2000, there were 2,319 people, 928 households, and 638 families residing in the city. The population density was 751.2 inhabitants per square mile (290.0/km^{2}). There were 990 housing units at an average density of 320.7 per square mile (123.8/km^{2}). The racial makeup of the city was 91.55% White, 1.42% Black or African American, 0.69% Native American, 2.11% Asian, 0.09% Pacific Islander, 1.68% from other races, and 2.46% from two or more races; 3.19% of the population were Hispanic or Latino of any race.

There were 928 households, out of which 37.6% had children under the age of 18 living with them, 55.5% were married couples living together, 10.1% had a female householder with no husband present, and 31.3% were non-families. 22.7% of all households were made up of individuals, and 4.1% had someone living alone who was 65 years of age or older. The average household size was 2.49 and the average family size was 2.98.

In the city, the population was spread out, with 27.8% under the age of 18, 10.3% from 18 to 24, 42.8% from 25 to 44, 13.6% from 45 to 64, and 5.5% who were 65 years of age or older. The median age was 29 years. For every 100 females, there were 91.3 males. For every 100 females age 18 and over, there were 87.6 males.

The median income for a household in the city was $44,556, and the median income for a family was $51,618. Males had a median income of $35,189 versus $25,625 for females. The per capita income for the city was $21,502. About 5.4% of families and 7.6% of the population were below the poverty line, including 10.2% of those under age 18 and 9.6% of those age 65 or over.

== Government ==
The City of Johnson is operated under a mayor/council governmental system. The City Council meets on the second Tuesday of every month.

=== Governmental officers ===
- Mayor Chris Keeney
- Recorder/treasurer Jennifer Allen
- District Judge Terra Stephenson
- City Attorney Harrington Miller
- Police Chief Chris Kelley
- Fire Chief
- Building Official Clay Wilson
- Councilmember Sean Engle
- Councilmember Dan Cross
- Councilmember Bob Fant
- Councilmember Katherine Hudson
- Councilmember John Wright

== Education ==
Most of Johnson is in the Fayetteville School District while a portion is in the Springdale School District. The former district's comprehensive high school is Fayetteville High School.

In 2022, residents of the Springdale portion are: For elementary school residents are divided between Rollins, Tyson, and Walker elementaries. For middle school most are zoned to Helen Tyson Middle School while some are zoned to Hellstern Middle School. For junior high most are zoned to Southwest Junior High while some are zoned to Central Junior High. All residents of that area are zoned to Har-Ber High School. The Springdale district portion, in 2006, was divided between Tyson Elementary School and Walker Elementary School. All portions of Springdale School District Johnson were zoned to Helen Tyson Middle School, Southwest Junior High School, and Har-Ber.

== Infrastructure ==
=== Transit ===
As of 2023, there is no fixed route transit service in Johnson. Ozark Regional Transit operates bus service in the neighboring communities, but only demand-response service in Johnson.This service only encompasses the Southern most area of the City located near the intersection of W. Joyce Blvd and Wilkerson St. The nearest intercity bus service is provided by Jefferson Lines in nearby Fayetteville.

=== Trails ===
Clear Creek Trail: The nearly three-mile Clear Creek Trail connects Scull Creek Trail to Lake Fayetteville Park and is part of the Northwest Arkansas Razorback Regional Greenway, a 40-mile trail that connects south Fayetteville to north Bentonville, and is funded by a grant from the Walton Family Foundation to the Northwest Arkansas Regional Planning Commission.

=== Water ===
Water service in Johnson is provided by Springdale Water Utilities by an inter-municipal agreement. Springdale purchases treated water from Beaver Water District. Wastewater is treated and conveyed into the Springdale system, except the southern reaches which gravity flow into the Fayetteville system.

== See also ==
- Johnson Switch Building
