= Johnson House and Mill =

Historic house in Arkansas, United States

- U.S. National Register of Historic Places
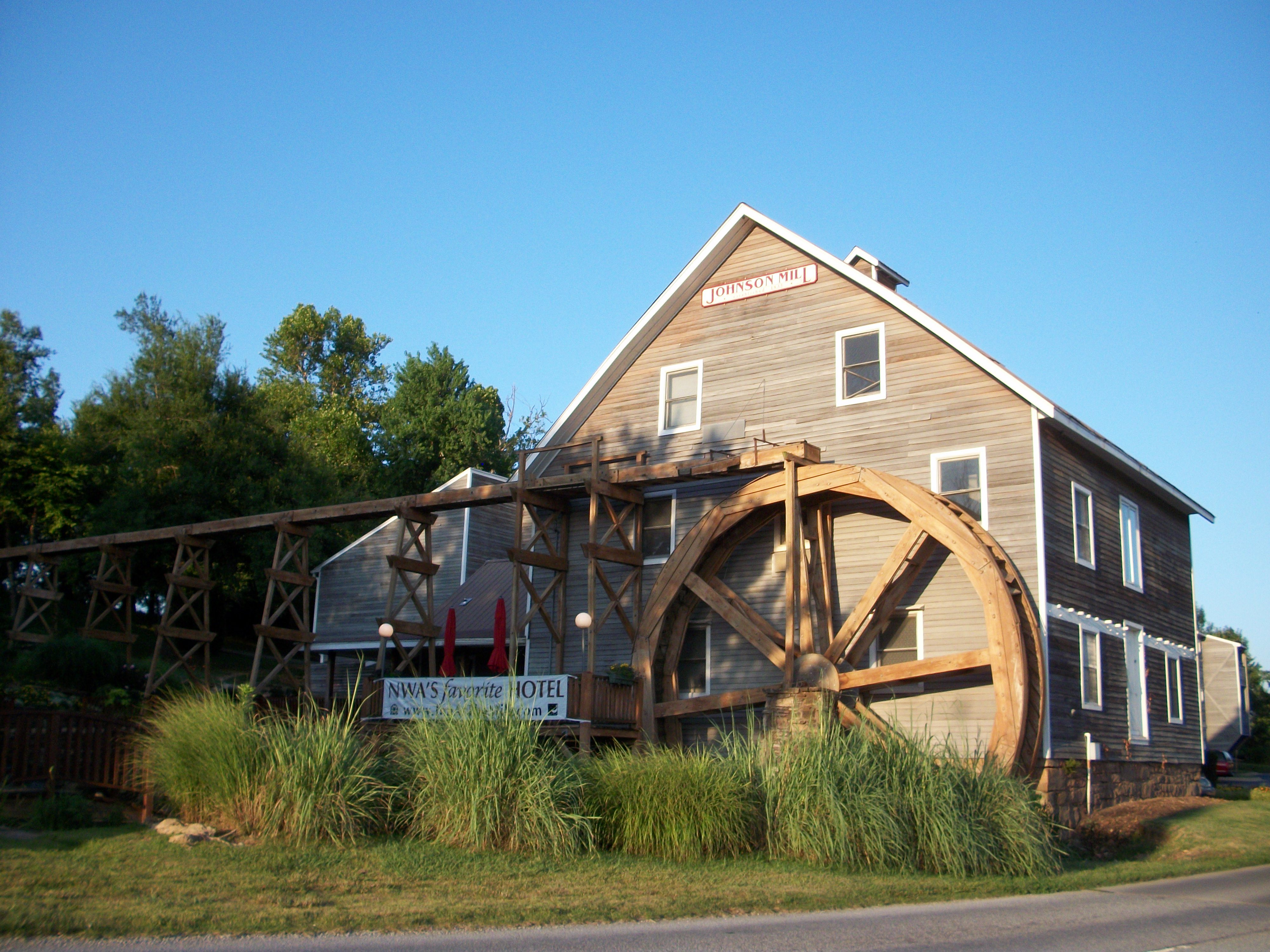
- Johnson Mill building adjacent to Johnson Mill Rd

- Location within Arkansas Location within the United States
- Location: 3906 Johnson Mill Blvd, Johnson, Arkansas
- Coordinates: 36°8′14″N 94°10′41″W
- Area: 2.8 acres (1.1 ha)
- Built: 1867
- NRHP reference No.: 76000473
- Added to NRHP: December 12, 1976

The Johnson House and Mill is a group of historically significant structures at 3906 Johnson Mill Boulevard in Johnson, Arkansas, USA. The house is a two-story brick building, fashioned from locally manufactured bricks, and the mill is a large 2 1/2-story wood-frame structure with a gable roof and large waterwheel at one end. The mill was built c. 1865-67 and the house in 1882, by Jacob Q. Johnson, the town's namesake. The complex was listed on the National Register of Historic Places. The mill building, which operated well into the 20th century, has been converted into a hotel.

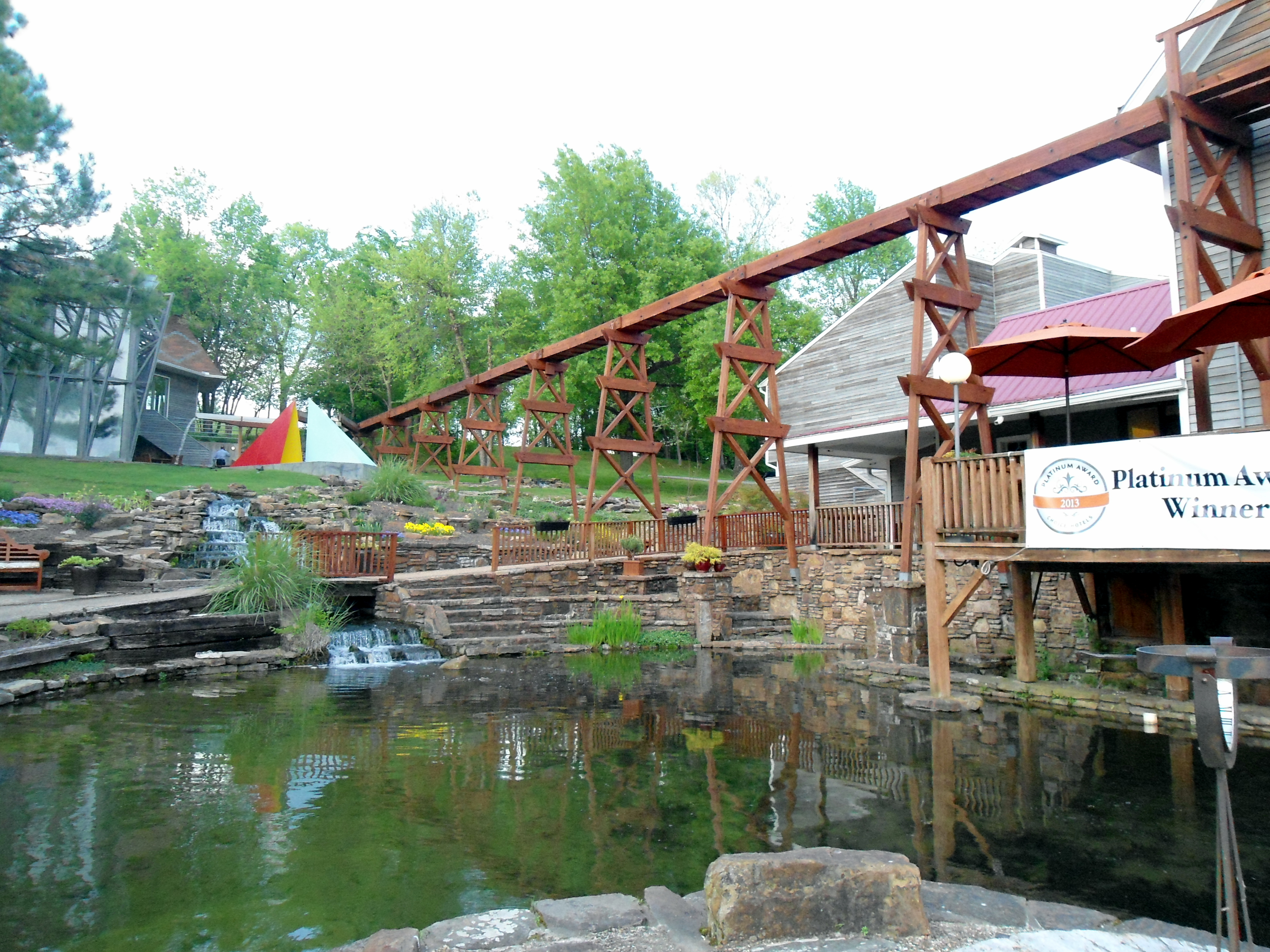
Pond adjacent to the mill, with hotel restaurant in the background

== See also ==
- Johnson Switch Building
- National Register of Historic Places listings in Washington County, Arkansas
