= Springdale High School =

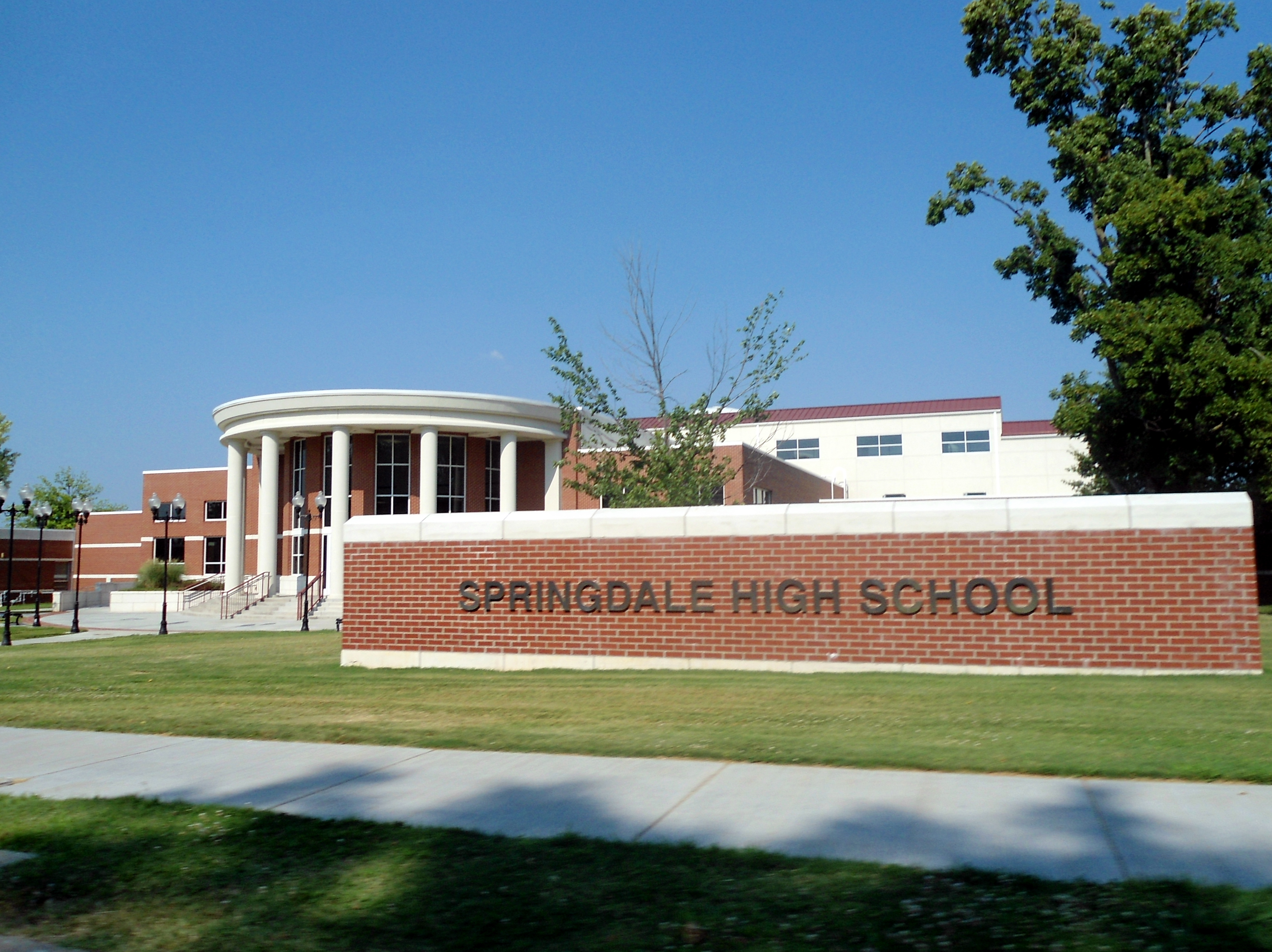

Location
- 1103 West Emma Avenue; Springdale, Arkansas 72764; United States; 36°11′06″N 94°08′32″W

Information
- Type: Public secondary
- Established: 1940 (86 years ago)
- School district: Springdale Public Schools
- NCES District ID: 0512660
- CEEB code: 042315
- NCES School ID: 051266001025
- Principal: Jason Jones
- Teaching staff: 180.52 (on FTE basis)
- Grades: 10-12
- Enrollment: 2,195 (2023-2024)
- Student to teacher ratio: 12.16
- Colors: Red, white, black
- Mascot: Bulldog
- Newspaper: Bulldog Herald
- Yearbook: The Bulldog
- Website: shs.sdale.org

Springdale High School is a public high school in Springdale, Arkansas, United States for students in grades ten through twelve. Springdale High School is one of three high schools administered by the Springdale School District, the others being Har-Ber High School and Don Tyson School of Innovation.

Springdale High's zone, as of 2006, includes sections of Springdale (including most of the former municipality of Bethel Heights), and portions of Fayetteville and Goshen.

== Notable people ==
=== Alumni ===
- Carolyn Pollan '55 - longest serving Republican and longest serving woman member of the Arkansas House of Representatives; resides in Fort Smith
- Mitch Mustain '06 - former University of Arkansas and University of Southern California quarterback
- Damian Williams '06 - former Arkansas and University of Southern California wide receiver. In the 2010 NFL draft, Williams was selected with the 77th pick by the Tennessee Titans.
- Marquesha Davis '19 - former University of Arkansas and University of Ole Miss guard. In the 2024 WNBA draft, Davis was selected with the 11th pick by the New York Liberty.

=== Staff ===
- Eliah Drinkwitz - Former assistant football coach, went on to be head coach at Appalachian State and Missouri.
- Rhett Lashlee - Former assistant football coach, went on to be head coach at SMU.
- Gus Malzahn - Former football coach, went on to be head coach at Auburn and UCF.
