= Bethel, Arkansas =

Bethel, Arkansas may refer to:

- Bethel, Clark County, Arkansas
- Bethel, Columbia County, Arkansas
- Bethel, Greene County, Arkansas
- Bethel, Pope County, Arkansas

or

- Bethel Grove, Arkansas in Washington County
- Bethel Heights, Arkansas in Benton County
