= İzmir (disambiguation) =

İzmir is the third-most populous city in Turkey.

İzmir may also refer to:

== Places ==
- İzmir Province, province of Turkey

== Politics ==
- İzmir (electoral districts)
  - İzmir (1st electoral district)
  - İzmir (2nd electoral district)

== Transportation ==
- TCG İzmir (D 341)
- TCG İzmir (F 516)

== See also ==
- Smyrna (disambiguation)
