= Johnson Switch Building =

- U.S. National Register of Historic Places
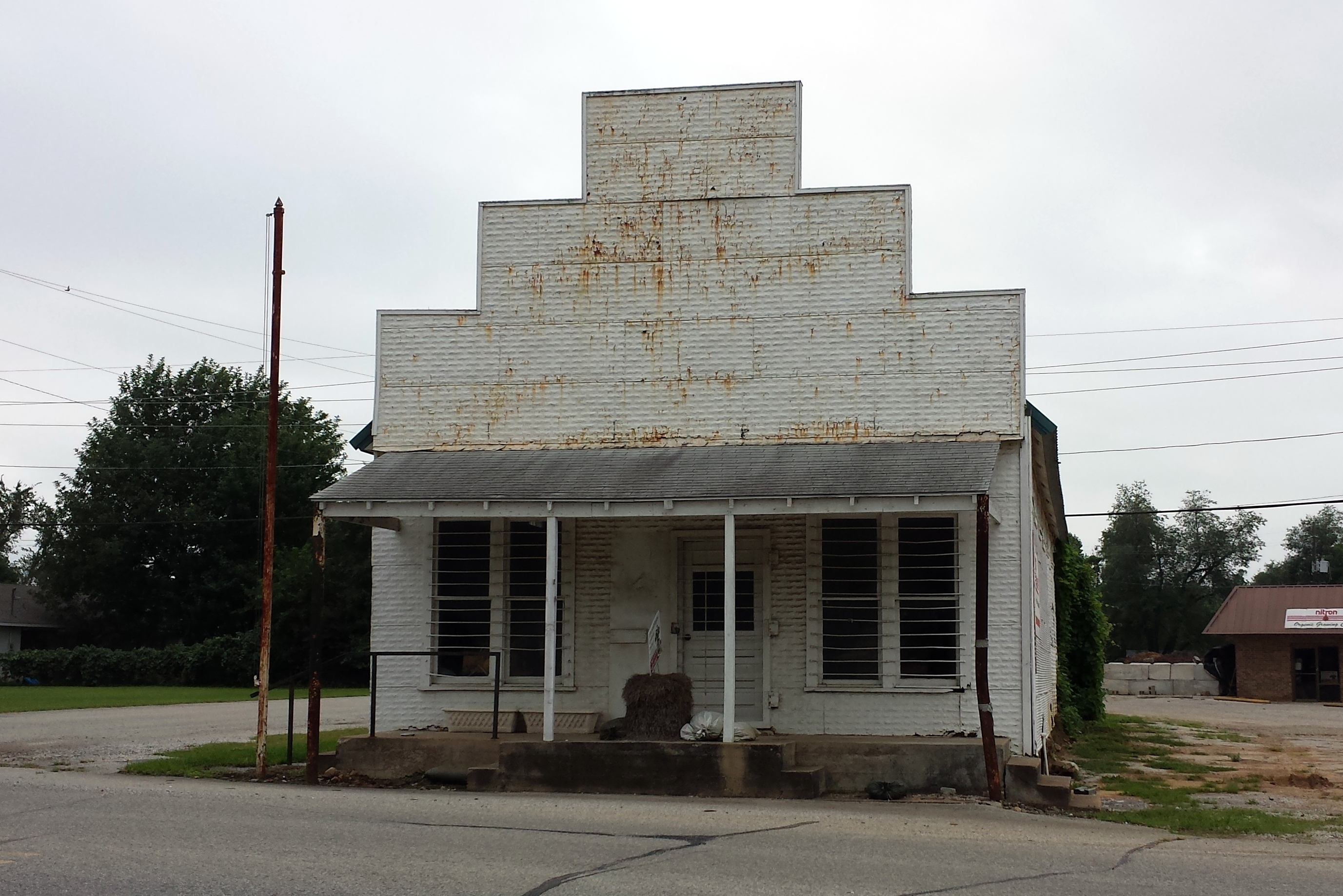

- Location within Arkansas Location within the United States
- Location: 3201 Main St., Johnson, Arkansas
- Coordinates: 36°8′1″N 94°10′0″W
- Area: less than one acre
- Built: 1936
- Architectural style: Early Commercial
- NRHP reference No.: 99000251
- Added to NRHP: February 26, 1999

The Johnson Switch Building is a historic commercial building in 3201 Main Street in Johnson, Arkansas, USA. Built in 1904, it is a single-story structure with a pressed-metal facade designed to resemble brickwork, and a gable roof obscured by a stepped parapet. Named for a nearby railroad switch, it is the oldest surviving commercial building in the small community's downtown area.

The building was listed on the National Register of Historic Places in 1999.

== See also ==
- Johnson House and Mill
- National Register of Historic Places listings in Washington County, Arkansas
