= Accident, Arkansas =

- Unincorporated community
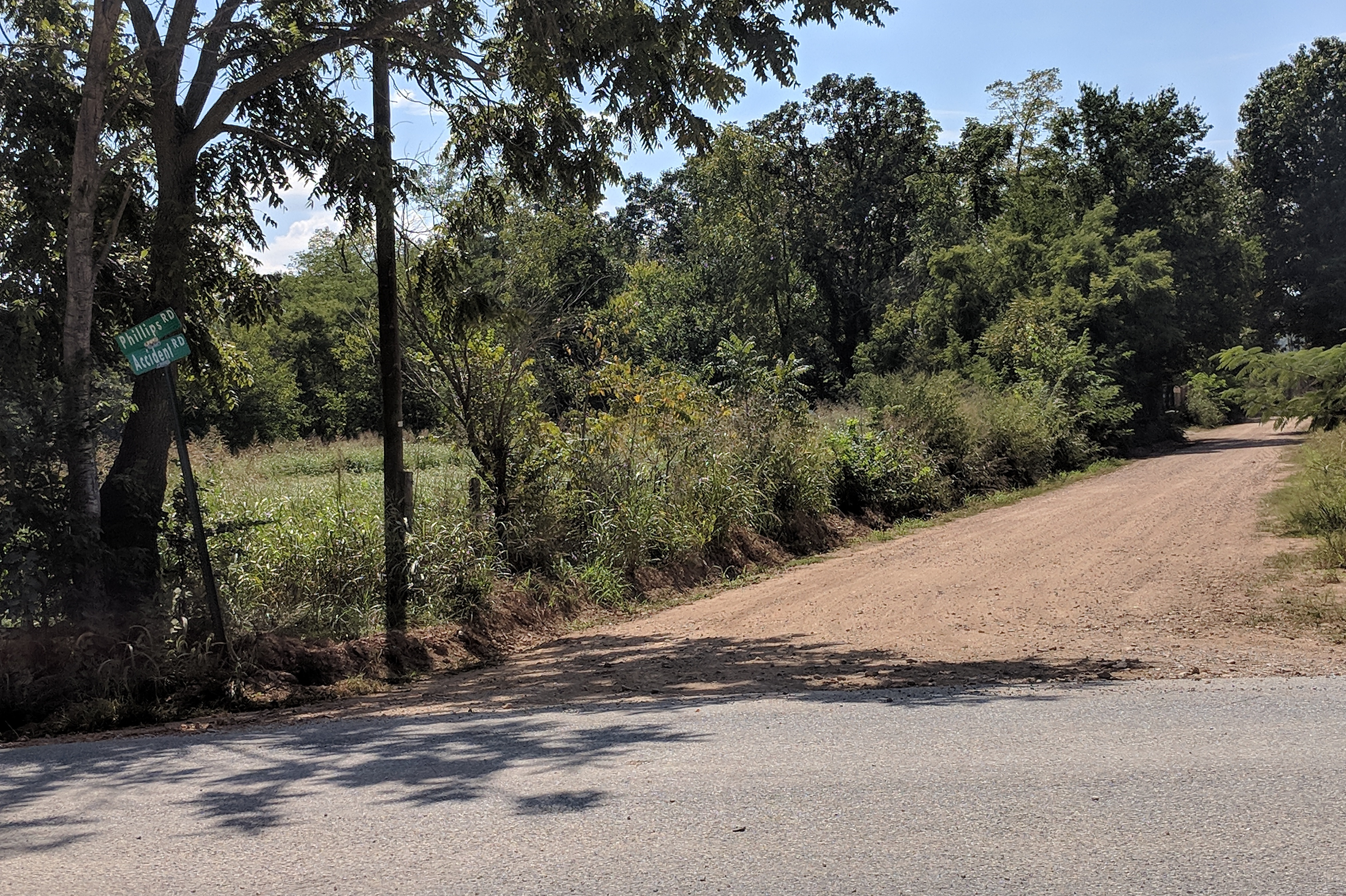
- Accident Road

- Accident's position in Arkansas Accident, Arkansas (the United States)
- Coordinates: 36°13′40″N 94°6′6″W
- Country: United States
- State: Arkansas
- County: Washington
- Township: 2
- Elevation: 1,381 ft (421 m)
- Time zone: UTC-6 (Central (CST))
  - Summer (DST): UTC-5 (CDT)
- ZIP code: 72745
- Area code: 479
- GNIS feature ID: 75359

Accident is an unincorporated community in Township 2, Benton County, Arkansas, United States. It is located near Highway 264 north of Bethel Heights.
