= Zach McWhorter =

American pole vaulter (born 1999)

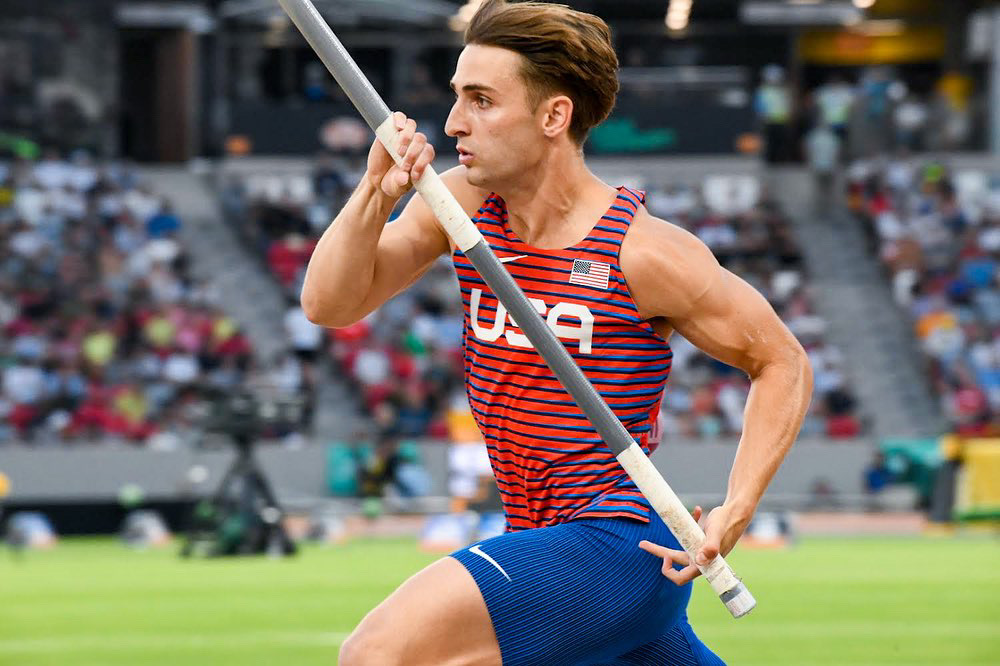
- McWhorter at the 2023 World Athletics Championships

Personal information
- Nationality: United States
- Born: January 7, 1999 (age 27)
- Home town: Springdale, Arkansas
- Education: Har-Ber High School; Brigham Young University
- Height: 178 cm (5 ft 10 in)
- Weight: 73 kg (161 lb)

Sport
- Sport: Athletics
- Event: Pole vault
- College team: BYU Cougars
- Coached by: Rick McWhorter

Achievements and titles
- National finals: 2015 USA U18s; • Pole vault, 2nd (silver); 2016 USA U20s; • Pole vault, 6th; 2021 NCAA Indoors; • Pole vault, 2nd (silver); 2022 USA Indoors; • Pole vault, 3rd (bronze); 2022 NCAA Indoors; • Pole vault, 2nd (silver); 2023 USA Champs; • Pole vault, 2nd (silver)
- Personal best: Pole vault: 5.86 m (2023)

Zach McWhorter (born January 7, 1999) is an American pole vaulter. At the 2023 USA Outdoor Track and Field Championships he placed second behind Olympic silver medalist Chris Nilsen, with a clearance of 5.86 m. This earned him a spot on the United States team at the 2023 World Athletics Championships, where he would go on to place 8th overall.

McWhorter has set the record for the top left-handed pole vault clearance, surpassing the previous mark of 5.80m set by Australian Olympic pole vaulter Simon Arkell.

== Career ==
As a prep at Har-Ber High School, McWhorter was a four-time Arkansas Activities Association state champion in the pole vault, and placed second at the New Balance Nationals Indoor championship meet. In 2016, he won the USATF under-18 championships in the pole vault.

McWhorter signed with the BYU Cougars track and field team, and started competing in late 2019 after his missionary service in Indonesia. In September 2019, he was impaled by his pole and required 18 stitches to his groin. The incident was captured on video and posted to TikTok, where it went viral.

He returned for the 2021 NCAA Division I Indoor Track and Field Championships, finishing 2nd with a 5.80 m clearance which also qualified him for the 2021 United States Olympic trials. At the trials, McWhorter cleared 5.40 m on his second attempt but could not clear 5.50 m, placing 19th and ultimately failing to make the 2021 U.S. Olympic team.

McWhorter won his first senior national medal at the 2022 USA Indoor Track and Field Championships, placing 3rd behind Chris Nilsen and KC Lightfoot – although as it was an indoor championship, only the top two were selected to represent the U.S. at the 2022 World Athletics Indoor Championships. He went on to finish runner-up again at the 2022 NCAA Division I Indoor Track and Field Championships with a 5.70 m clearance.

McWhorter's greatest achievement the following year came at the 2023 USA Outdoor Track and Field Championships. After clearing 5.76 m and 5.81 m each on his second attempt, he attempted 5.86 m, a new personal best, and managed to clear the bar on his third and final attempt. This earned him runner-up status behind Chris Nilsen and a spot on his first national team at the 2023 World Athletics Championships. At the world championships, he finished 6th in qualification and 8th in the finals.

== Personal life ==
McWhorter grew up in Springdale, Arkansas and attended Har-Ber High School. After his high school graduation in 2017, he took a hiatus from pole vaulting to embark on a two-year volunteer mission in Indonesia. He resumed his athletic journey in 2019 when he enrolled at Brigham Young University. During his tenure there, he distinguished himself as a two-time silver medalist at the NCAA Division I Men's Indoor Track and Field Championships. In January 2023, McWhorter commenced a master's program at Duke University and intended to compete for their track and field team. However, after just two weeks, he opted to leave the program to dedicate himself fully to pole vaulting.

McWhorter is coached by his father Rick McWhorter, who was also a top-10 pole vaulter for the BYU Cougars.

== Statistics ==
=== Personal best progression ===
Pole Vault progression
#	Mark	Pl.	Competition	Venue	Date	Ref.
1	4.75 m	2nd place, silver medalist(s)	USATF Youth Championships	Lisle, IL	June 29, 2015	
2	4.87 m	= (bronze)	UCS Spirit Pole Vault Summit	Reno, NV	January 15, 2016	
3	4.98 m	2nd place, silver medalist(s)	Arkansas Activities Association Indoor State Championships	Fayetteville, AR	February 5, 2016	
4	5.11 m	2nd place, silver medalist(s)	New Balance Nationals Indoor	New York, NY	March 11, 2016	
5	5.20 m	1st place, gold medalist(s)	USATF Youth Indoor Championships	Staten Island, NY	March 12, 2016	
6	5.76 m	1st place, gold medalist(s)	BYU Cougar Indoor Meeting #2	Provo, UT	February 5, 2021	
7	5.80 m	2nd place, silver medalist(s)	NCAA Division I Men's Indoor Track and Field Championships	Fayetteville, AR	March 12, 2021	
8	5.82 m	1st place, gold medalist(s)	BYU December Invite	Provo, UT	December 9, 2021	
9	5.85 m	1st place, gold medalist(s)	Dr. Sander Invitational Columbia Challenge	New York, NY	February 3, 2022	
10	5.86 m	2nd place, silver medalist(s)	USA Outdoor Track and Field Championships	Eugene, OR	July 7, 2023	
