= New Smyrna =

New Smyrna is the name of:

In Greece:

- Nea Smyrni, a suburb of Athens, Greece.

In the United States:

- New Smyrna, Florida
- New Smyrna Beach, Florida
  - New Smyrna Beach High School
  - New Smyrna Beach Historic District
  - New Smyrna Beach Municipal Airport
  - New Smyrna Sugar Mill Ruins
  - New Smyrna Speedway

== See also ==
- Smyrna (disambiguation)
