= Smyrna, Arkansas =

Smyrna, Arkansas may refer to:

- Smyrna, Clark County, Arkansas
- Smyrna, Pope County, Arkansas
- Smyrna Township, Pope County, Arkansas
