= Mount Carmel, West Virginia =

Mount Carmel
- Unincorporated community
- Location within the state of West Virginia Mount Carmel (the United States)
- Coordinates: 39°10′15″N 81°22′7″W
- Country: United States
- State: West Virginia
- County: Wood
- Elevation: 971 ft (296 m)
- Time zone: UTC-5 (Eastern (EST))
  - Summer (DST): UTC-4 (EDT)
- GNIS ID: 1560445

Mount Carmel is an unincorporated community in Wood County, West Virginia, United States.
