= Salem (Bible) =

Canaanite city traditionally identified as Jerusalem

Salem (Hebrew: שָׁלֵם, Šālēm; Ancient Greek: Σαλήμ, Salḗm) is an ancient Middle Eastern town mentioned in the Bible. Traditionally, Salem is identified with Jerusalem; however, recent scholarship challenges this association.

Salem is referenced in the following biblical passages:

- Genesis 14:18: "And Melchizedek king of Salem brought forth bread and wine: and he was the priest of the most high God."
- Psalms 76:1–2: "In Judah, God is known, his name is great in Israel. His abode has been established in Salem, his dwelling place in Zion. There he broke the flashing arrows, the shield, the sword, and the weapons of war."
- Hebrews 7:2: “This King Melchizedek of Salem, priest of the Most High God, met Abraham as he was returning from defeating the kings and blessed him. To him Abraham apportioned 'one-tenth of everything.' His name, in the first place, means 'king of righteousness'; next he is also king of Salem, that is, 'king of peace.'"

The deuterocanonical Book of Judith mentions the "valley of Salem".

Possibly a different place is mentioned in Genesis 33:18: "And Jacob came to Shalem, a city of Shechem, which is in the land of Canaan, when he came from Padanaram; and pitched his tent before the city." The town of Salim corresponds to that location. It is also mentioned in the Gospel of John 3:23: "And John also was baptizing in Aenon near to Saleím [Σαλείμ], because there was much water there: and they came, and were baptized."

Various towns have been named after Biblical Salem.

== Identification ==
Salem is traditionally identified with Jerusalem. This view is based on linguistic similarities between “Shalem” and the latter part of the name “Jerusalem” (Hebrew: יְרוּשָׁלַיִם, Yerushalayim). The association also derives from the connection between Melchizedek, the king of Salem, and later biblical references to Jerusalem as a holy city.

Recent scholarship, particularly by Robert Cargill in Melchizedek, King of Sodom: How Scribes Invented the Biblical Priest-King, has challenged the identification of Salem with Jerusalem. Cargill argues that early texts such as Egyptian execration texts (c. 1800 BCE) and Amarna letters (c. 1400 BCE) consistently refer to Jerusalem by longer names like “Ru-ša-li-mum” and “U-ru-sa-lim,” suggesting that Jerusalem was never called “Salem” in antiquity.

Additionally, in his analysis of Psalm 76:2, Cargill interprets Salem and Zion as distinct locations, with Salem referring to a northern Samaritan city near Shechem. Similarly, Cargill argues that Genesis 33:18 clearly places Shalem near Shechem, not Jerusalem.
