= Salem, Virginia Beach =

Salem
- Residential area
- Location within the Commonwealth of Virginia Salem (the United States)
- Coordinates: 36°47′23″N 76°7′29″W
- Country: United States
- State: Virginia
- Independent city: Virginia Beach
- Time zone: UTC−5 (Eastern (EST))
  - Summer (DST): UTC−4 (EDT)
- ZIP codes: 23456, 23464

Salem is a residential area of Virginia Beach, Virginia located in the southern part of the independent city. The Virginia Beach Sportsplex stadium is located within the community. It is a three-level steel and concrete structure, formerly home to the Virginia Beach Mariners professional soccer team.
