= Goshen, Arkansas =

- City
- Location of Goshen in Washington County, Arkansas.
- Coordinates: 36°06′15″N 93°58′46″W
- Country: United States
- State: Arkansas
- County: Washington

Area
  - Total: 11.52 sq mi (29.84 km^{2})
  - Land: 11.31 sq mi (29.30 km^{2})
  - Water: 0.21 sq mi (0.54 km^{2})
- Elevation: 1,132 ft (345 m)

Population (2020)
  - Total: 2,102
  - Estimate (2025): 2,405 ▲
  - Density: 185.8/sq mi (71.74/km^{2})
- Time zone: UTC-6 (Central (CST))
  - Summer (DST): UTC-5 (CDT)
- ZIP code: 72735
- Area code: 479
- FIPS code: 05-27670
- GNIS feature ID: 2406595
- Website: www.goshenar.gov

Goshen is a city in Washington County, Arkansas, United States. The population was 2,102 at the 2020 census. It is part of the Northwest Arkansas region. According to Business Insider, it is the “most educated” city in the state of Arkansas (September 10, 2014).

== History ==
An early variant name was "College Grove". A post office called Gosh-en has been in operation since 1876.

== Geography ==
According to the United States Census Bureau, the town has a total area of 29.3 km^{2} (11.3 mi^{2}), of which 29.0 km^{2} (11.2 mi^{2}) is land and 0.3 km^{2} (0.1 mi^{2}) (1.06%) is water.

== Demographics ==
Historical population
Census	Pop.	Note	%±
1990	589		—
2000	752		27.7%
2010	1,071		42.4%
2020	2,102		96.3%
2025 (est.)	2,405	▲	14.4%
U.S. Decennial Census

At the 2000 census there were 752 people in 277 households, including 211 families, in the town. The population density was 25.9/km^{2} (67.1/mi^{2}). There were 310 housing units at an average density of 10.7/km^{2} (27.7/mi^{2}). The racial makeup of the town was 96.28% White, 0.13% Black or African American, 0.80% Native American, 0.40% Asian, 1.06% from other races, and 1.33% from two or more races. 0.80% of the population were Hispanic or Latino of any race. Of the 277 households 37.2% had children under the age of 18 living with them, 69.7% were married couples living together, 4.0% had a female householder with no husband present, and 23.8% were non-families. 18.8% of households were one person and 7.2% were one person aged 65 or older. The average household size was 2.71 and the average family size was 3.16.

The age distribution was 27.1% under the age of 18, 7.7% from 18 to 24, 30.3% from 25 to 44, 24.7% from 45 to 64, and 10.1% 65 or older. The median age was 38 years. For every 100 females, there were 98.4 males. For every 100 females age 18 and over, there were 98.6 males.

The median household income was $47,083 and the median family income was $52,891. Males had a median income of $32,353 versus $21,750 for females. The per capita income for the town was $18,513. About 5.6% of families and 6.4% of the population were below the poverty line, including 5.8% of those under age 18 and 6.0% of those age 65 or over.

== Education ==
Most of Goshen is in the Fayetteville School District while a portion is in the Springdale School District. The former district's comprehensive high school is Fayetteville High School.

In 2022 the portion of Goshen in the Springdale district is zoned to Turnbow Elementary School, Sonora Middle School, Lakeside Junior High School, and Springdale High School.

The Springdale portion, in 2006, was zoned to Harp Elementary School, J.O. Kelly Middle School, George Junior High School, and Springdale High School.

== Transportation ==
As of 2023, there is no fixed route transit service in Goshen. Ozark Regional Transit operates demand-response service in the city. The nearest intercity bus service is provided by Jefferson Lines in nearby Fayetteville.
