= Mount Olive, Arkansas =

Mount Olive, Arkansas may refer to any one of many locations in the U.S. state of Arkansas:

- Mount Olive, Ashley County, Arkansas
- Mount Olive, Bradley County, Arkansas
- Mount Olive, Conway County, Arkansas
- Mount Olive, Howard County, Arkansas
- Mount Olive, Izard County, Arkansas
- Mount Olive, Washington County, Arkansas
