= Har-Ber High School =

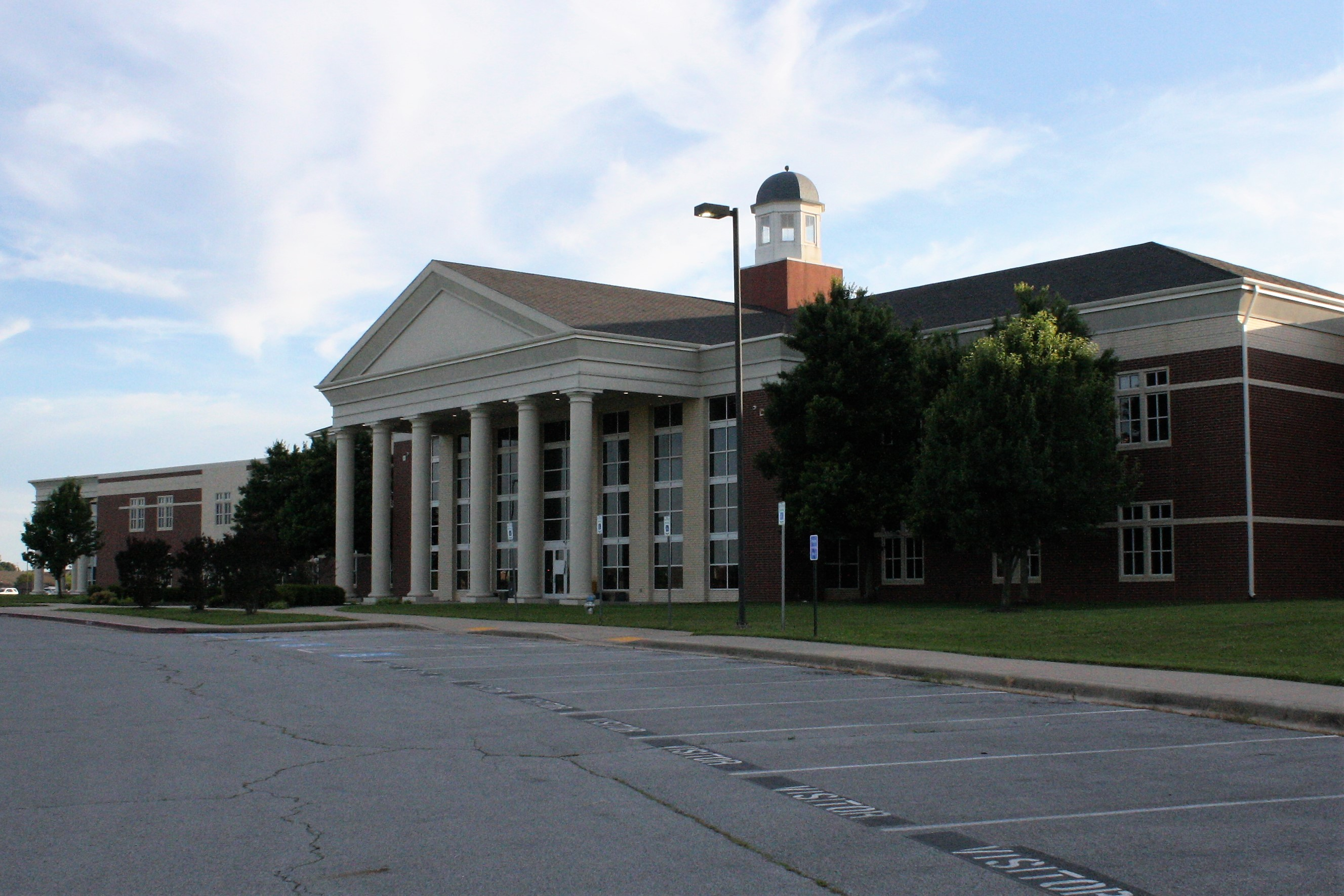

Location
- 300 Jones Road; Springdale, Arkansas 72762; United States
- Coordinates: 36°10′55″N 94°12′37″W

Information
- School district: Springdale Public Schools
- NCES District ID: 0512660
- CEEB code: 042147
- NCES School ID: 051266001118
- Principal: Paul Griep
- Teaching staff: 153.12 (FTE)
- Grades: 10-12
- Enrollment: 2,304 (2023–2024)
- Student to teacher ratio: 15.05
- Campus type: Suburban
- Colors: Navy blue and Carolina blue
- Athletics conference: 7A West (2008-14)
- Nickname: Wildcats
- Rival: Springdale High School
- Accreditation: AdvancED (1979)
- Affiliation: Arkansas Activities Association (AAA)
- Website: har-ber.sdale.org

Har-Ber High School is a comprehensive public high school for grades ten through twelve serving the community of Springdale, Arkansas, United States. Har-Ber High School is one of three high schools managed in Washington County by Springdale Public Schools; others being Springdale High School, and the Don Tyson School of Innovation. The school was established in 2005.

Har-Ber High's zone, as of 2006, includes sections of Springdale, all of Elm Springs and Tontitown, a western section of the former municipality of Bethel Heights (now in Springdale), and portions of Fayetteville.

== History ==
Springdale Public Schools operated Springdale HS as the district's lone high school since it was built in 1961. Studies in the early 2000s indicated the district would exceed the 2,500 student capacity of SHS by 2005. At the time, the city's growth was mostly projected to the east toward Beaver Lake. The school district entered into negotiations to buy a 90 acres (36 ha) farm on the east side of town for a second high school, but negotiations stalled. The George family donated a 43 acres (17 ha) tract on the east side of Springdale to the school district in January 2002, but school administration wanted a larger tract for the second high school campus.

On January 22, 2002, the school board voted to buy 120 acres (49 ha) of land on the west side of town for $2.4 million ($4.30 million in current dollars). Construction of a $36.3 million ($61.90 million in current dollars) campus completed in time to open Har-Ber High School for the 2005 school year. By 2006, Har-Ber had 1,178 students, and was projected to be at capacity by 2009.

Accredited by AdvancED since 1979, Har-Ber High School is named in honor of local industrialists Harvey and Bernice Jones.

== Demographics ==
The demographic breakdown of the 1,794 students enrolled in 2013-14 was:

- Male - 54.0%
- Female - 46.0%
- Native American/Alaskan - 0.4%
- Asian/Pacific islanders - 7.6%
- Black - 1.4%
- Hispanic - 26.5%
- White - 62.5%
- Multiracial - 1.6%

39.2% of the students were eligible for free or reduced lunch.

== Extracurricular activities ==
The Har-Ber High School mascot is the wildcat and Navy blue and Carolina blue serve as the school colors. For the 2012–2014 seasons, the Har-Ber Wildcats participate in the state's largest classification (6A) within the 6A West Conference. Competition is primarily sanctioned by the Arkansas Activities Association with the Wildcats competing in baseball, basketball (boys/girls), competitive cheer, cross country, football, golf (boys/girls), soccer (boys/girls), softball, swimming (boys/girls), tennis (boys/girls), track and field, volleyball, and wrestling.

== Notable people ==
- Payton Chadwick (born 1995), American hurdler
- Joshua Frazier - college football player, drafted by the Pittsburgh Steelers in the seventh round of the 2018 NFL draft. Har-Ber graduate class of 2014.
- Rhett Lashlee - college football coach, former volunteer quarterback coach at Har-Ber
- Zach McWhorter (born 1999), American pole vaulter
