= Bethel, Minnesota =

City in Minnesota, United States

Bethel
- City
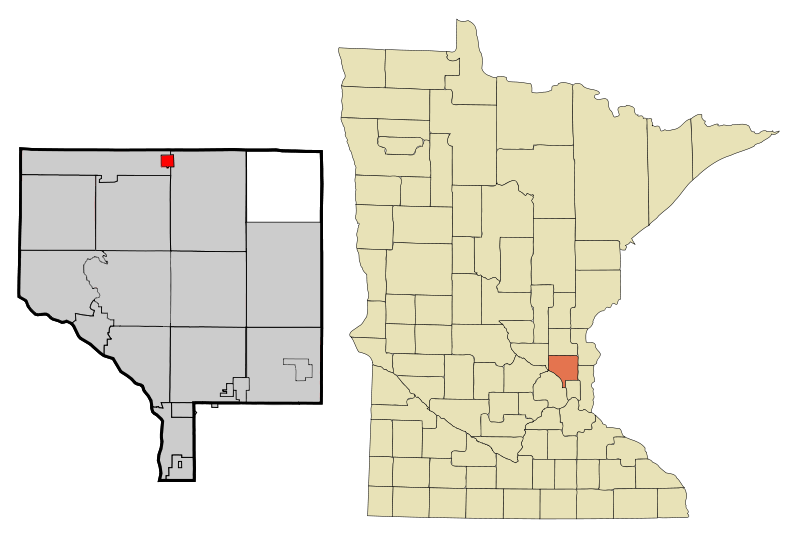
- Location of the city of Bethel within Anoka County, Minnesota
- Coordinates: 45°24′08″N 93°16′16″W
- Country: United States
- State: Minnesota
- County: Anoka
- Incorporated: 1902

Area
  - Total: 1.04 sq mi (2.70 km^{2})
  - Land: 0.98 sq mi (2.54 km^{2})
  - Water: 0.062 sq mi (0.16 km^{2})
- Elevation: 932 ft (284 m)

Population (2020)
  - Total: 476
  - Density: 485.6/sq mi (187.51/km^{2})
- Time zone: UTC-6 (Central (CST))
  - Summer (DST): UTC-5 (CDT)
- ZIP code: 55005
- Area code: 763
- FIPS code: 27-05554
- GNIS feature ID: 2394156
- Website: https://bethelmn.gov/

Bethel (/ˈbɛθəl/ BEH-thəl) is a city in Anoka County, Minnesota, United States. As of the 2020 census, Bethel had a population of 476.

== Geography ==
According to the United States Census Bureau, the city has a total area of 0.97 square miles (2.51 km^{2}), of which 0.91 square miles (2.36 km^{2}) is land and 0.06 square miles (0.16 km^{2}) is water.

237th Avenue / County Road 24 serves as a main route in the community. Minnesota State Highway 65 is nearby.

Bethel is located in the north–central part of Anoka County. The boundary line between Anoka and Isanti counties is nearby.

=== Adjacent cities ===
- East Bethel (east)
- St. Francis (west, south, north)

== History ==
Bethel was incorporated as a village in 1902, and was officially incorporated as the city of Bethel on January 1, 1974.

== Demographics ==
Historical population
Census	Pop.	Note	%±
1910	221		—
1920	265		19.9%
1930	184		−30.6%
1940	188		2.2%
1950	250		33.0%
1960	302		20.8%
1970	311		3.0%
1980	272		−12.5%
1990	394		44.9%
2000	443		12.4%
2010	466		5.2%
2020	476		2.1%
U.S. Decennial Census

=== 2010 census ===
As of the census of 2010, there were 466 people, 174 households, and 118 families residing in the city. The population density was 512.1 inhabitants per square mile (197.7/km^{2}). There were 192 housing units at an average density of 211.0 per square mile (81.5/km^{2}). The racial makeup of the city was 95.3% White, 0.9% African American, 0.4% Asian, 0.2% Pacific Islander, 0.9% from other races, and 2.4% from two or more races. Hispanic or Latino of any race were 2.1% of the population.

There were 174 households, of which 33.3% had children under the age of 18 living with them, 51.1% were married couples living together, 9.8% had a female householder with no husband present, 6.9% had a male householder with no wife present, and 32.2% were non-families. 22.4% of all households were made up of individuals, and 4% had someone living alone who was 65 years of age or older. The average household size was 2.68 and the average family size was 3.11.

The median age in the city was 34.3 years. 23.2% of residents were under the age of 18; 10.5% were between the ages of 18 and 24; 33.9% were from 25 to 44; 25.6% were from 45 to 64; and 6.9% were 65 years of age or older. The gender makeup of the city was 54.5% male and 45.5% female.

=== 2000 census ===
As of the census of 2000, there were 443 people, 149 households, and 108 families residing in the city. The population density was 514.1 inhabitants per square mile (198.5/km^{2}). There were 155 housing units at an average density of 179.9 per square mile (69.5/km^{2}). The racial makeup of the city was 96.39% White, 0.23% African American, 0.23% Native American, 0.23% Asian, 0.23% from other races, and 2.71% from two or more races. Hispanic or Latino of any race were 2.26% of the population.

There were 149 households, out of which 47.7% had children under the age of 18 living with them, 56.4% were married couples living together, 7.4% had a female householder with no husband present, and 27.5% were non-families. 18.1% of all households were made up of individuals, and 3.4% had someone living alone who was 65 years of age or older. The average household size was 2.97 and the average family size was 3.46.

In the city, the population was spread out, with 36.1% under the age of 18, 7.0% from 18 to 24, 39.7% from 25 to 44, 13.3% from 45 to 64, and 3.8% who were 65 years of age or older. The median age was 30 years. For every 100 females, there were 113.0 males. For every 100 females age 18 and over, there were 121.1 males.

The median income for a household in the city was $45,125, and the median income for a family was $50,500. Males had a median income of $36,406 versus $25,625 for females. The per capita income for the city was $16,399. About 4.5% of families and 6.4% of the population were below the poverty line, including 4.0% of those under age 18 and 9.1% of those age 65 or over.
