= Lebanon, Texas =

Community in Texas, US

Lebanon was the name of two different communities that were founded in Texas in the 19th century, neither of which exists today. The first was a town located in Collin County that had a post office designated as Lebanon, Texas, before it was relocated to Frisco. The second was a smaller unincorporated community located in Live Oak County, of which only a cemetery remains today.

== Town of Lebanon in Collin County, Texas ==
When the Dallas area was being settled by American pioneers in the 1840s, many of the settlers traveled by wagon trains along the old Shawnee Trail, which was also used for cattle drives north from Austin. This trail later became known as the Preston Trail and eventually, Preston Road. The town of Lebanon was founded along this trail to take advantage of this activity and the fertile farmland in the area. Reportedly, it was named after a settler's hometown of Lebanon, Tennessee. The town was granted a U.S. post office in 1860, and by the 1880s, it had a church, a school, a cotton gin, a flour mill, a blacksmith, and many other merchants.

In the late 1890s, the town of Lebanon hoped that the new railroad being built in the area would run through town, but the St. Louis-San Francisco Railway chose a route two miles west of the town. In addition, the railroad established a new town along its route to provide water for the trains, which sealed Lebanon's fate. The new town of Emerson was established in 1902, three miles northwest of Lebanon, and renamed itself Frisco after the railroad that had created it. Most residents and businesses in Lebanon relocated to the new town of Frisco. In 1905, the post office in Lebanon was closed.

No longer a town, Lebanon remained a farming community of a dozen houses, a school, and a church. The school closed in 1947, and by 2000, only the church and a few houses remained from the original town. In 2003, the Lebanon Baptist Church closed after 120 years of services in that location (the current building dating from 1904 after the original 1883 church was destroyed by a storm). By this time, the original town site had been annexed into the growing city of Frisco, and Preston Road (now a state highway) was being widened to six lanes. To avoid demolition, the church was donated to the City of Frisco and the building was moved to the Frisco Heritage Center, where it is now part of the museum and is being used as a wedding chapel. Around the same time, the last house dating from the town of Lebanon (built in 1895) was also moved to the Frisco Heritage Center.

The old town of Lebanon was located near what is now the intersection of Preston Road and John Hickman Parkway in the city of Frisco, Texas. Lebanon Baptist Church was originally located on the north edge of the old town, near what is now the intersection of Preston Road and Lebanon Road in Frisco. In addition to the history preserved at the Frisco Heritage Center, references to the original town can be seen in other places in Frisco: The City of Frisco named Lebanon Road in honor of the town; the Masonic Lodge in downtown Frisco is called the Lebanon Masonic Lodge; and the Frisco Independent School District named their ninth high school Lebanon Trail High School (which is less than a mile from the old town's location). In addition, inside of the school, the main hall includes a floor stating, "Lebanon, Texas founded in 1860."

== Community of Lebanon in Live Oak County, Texas ==
The unincorporated community of Lebanon in Live Oak County, Texas, was on a dirt road a mile north of Farm to Market Road 1203 and 12 miles southeast of Three Rivers. A school was built at the site in the 1880s. During the 1890s, a Methodist congregation was organized in the vicinity and used the schoolhouse for its services. A number of revivals were held in Lebanon during the 1890s, sometimes attracting as many as 600 people from communities in Live Oak and Bee Counties. Around 1920, the church was moved to Cadiz, a nearby town in Bee County, and by 1940, Lebanon's Methodist congregation had been disbanded. A map drawn in the late 1930s shows only a graveyard at the site.
