= Smyrna, Nebraska =

Unincorporated community in Nebraska, U.S.

Coordinates: 40°07′07″N 98°04′02″W

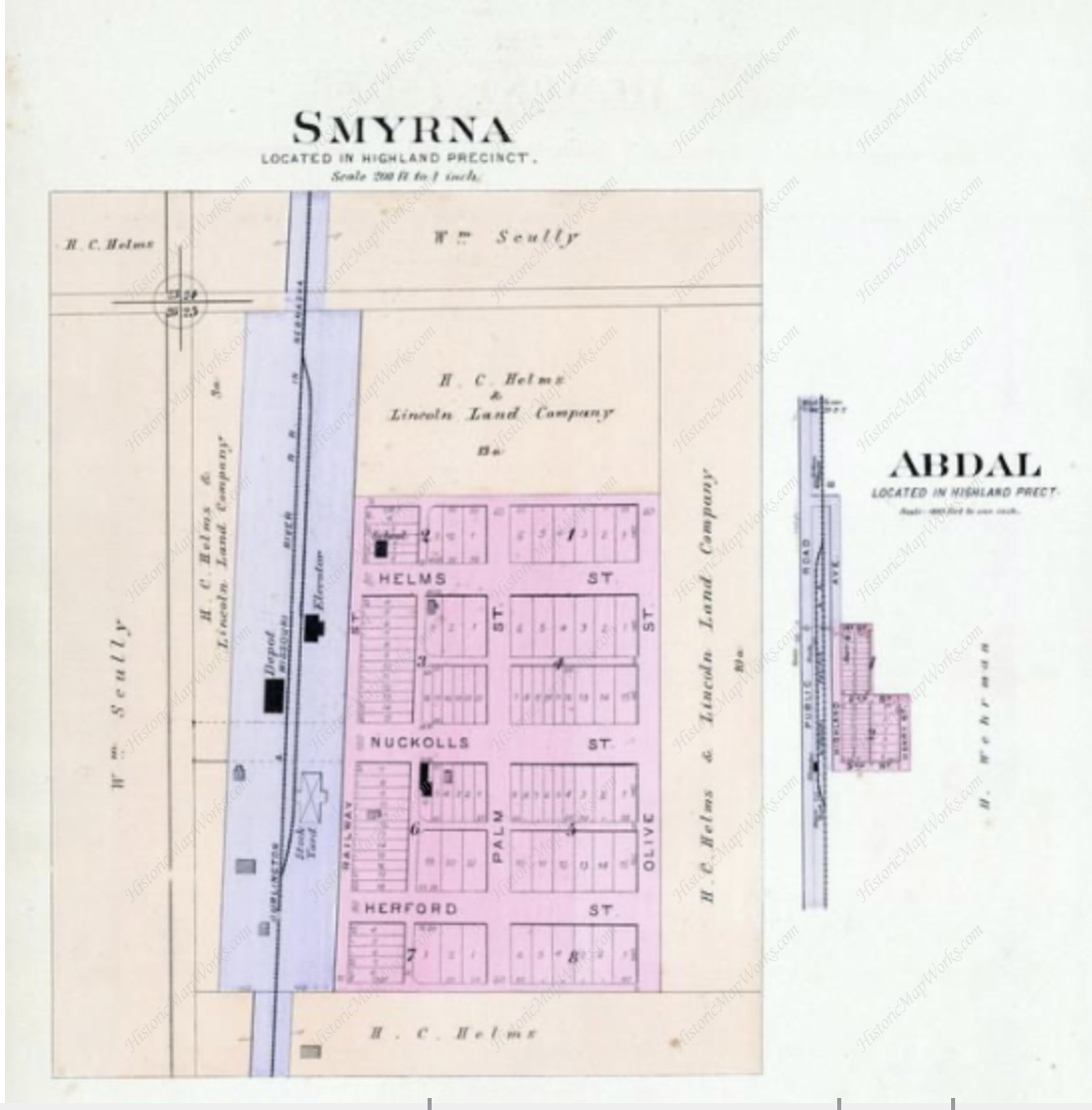
Smyrna and Abdal, Nebraska in the year 1900

Smyrna is an unincorporated community in Nuckolls County, Nebraska, United States.

== History ==
A post office was established at Smyrna in 1887, and remained in operation until it was discontinued in 1913. The community was named after the ancient city of Smyrna.
