= Smyrna, Louisville =

Neighborhood in Louisville, Kentucky

Coordinates: 38°07′49″N 85°38′33″W

Smyrna is a neighborhood of Louisville, Kentucky centered along Smyrna Road and Applegate Lane.
