= Smyrna, Pope County, Arkansas =

Smyrna, Arkansas
- Unincorporated community
- Position in Arkansas
- Coordinates: 35°39′03″N 92°55′12″W
- Country: United States
- State: Arkansas
- County: Pope
- Elevation: 925 ft (282 m)
- Time zone: UTC-6 (Central (CST))
  - Summer (DST): UTC-5 (CDT)
- GNIS feature ID: 73630

Smyrna is an unincorporated community in the Ozark National Forest, Smyrna Township, Pope County, Arkansas, United States.
