= Bethel Heights, Arkansas =

- City
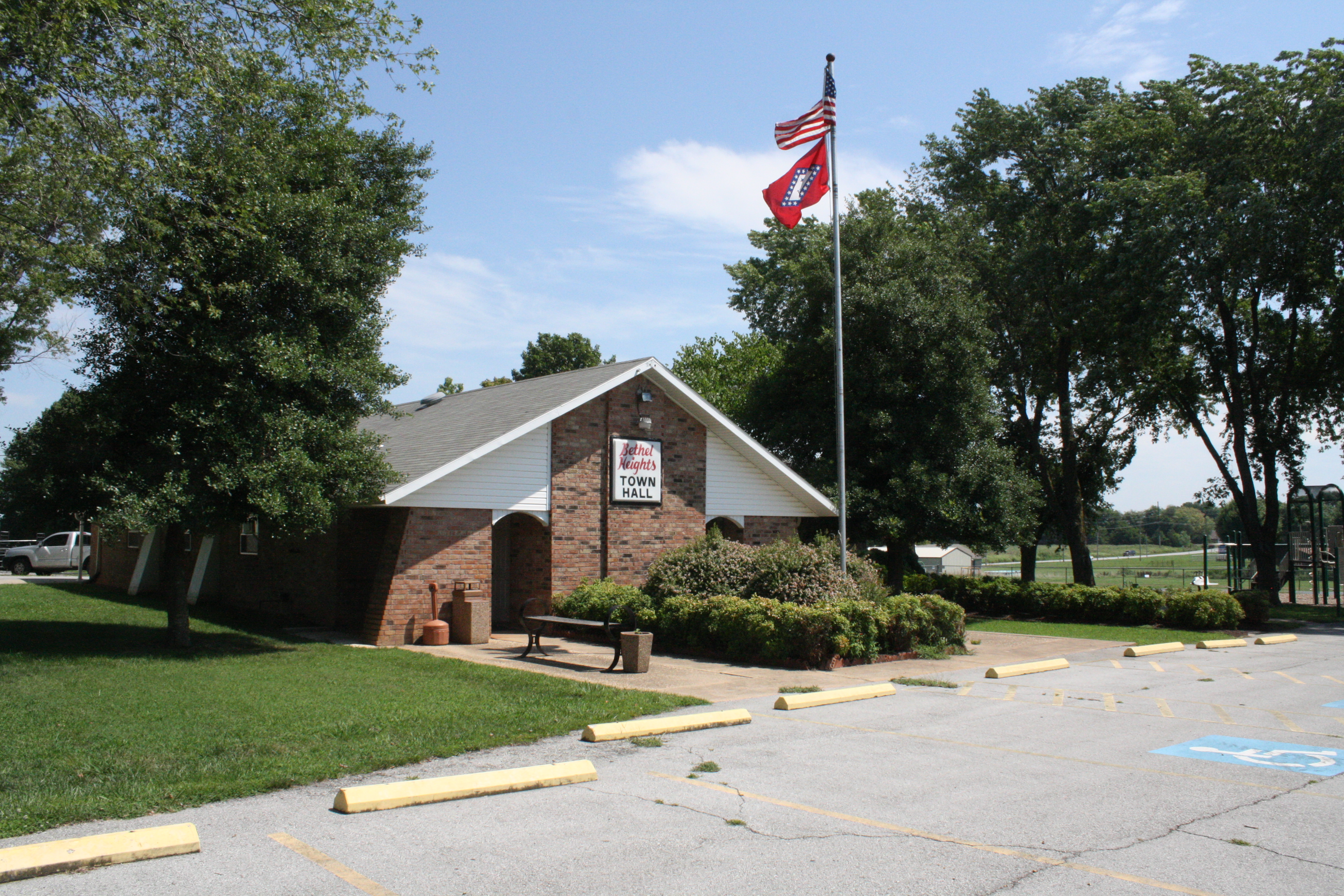
- City Hall

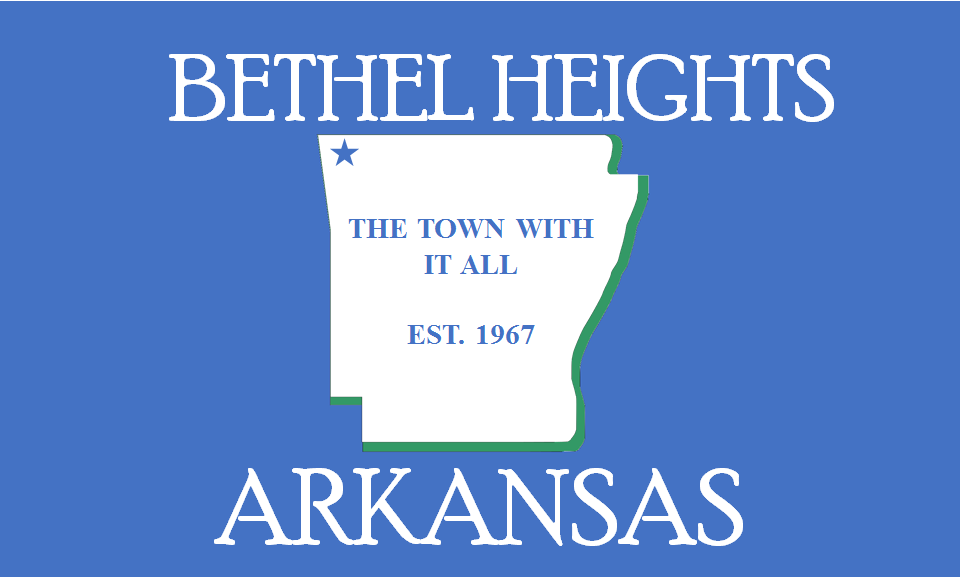
- Flag Seal

- Location of Bethel Heights in Benton County, Arkansas.
- Coordinates: 36°13′22″N 94°7′40″W
- Country: United States
- State: Arkansas
- County: Benton
- Established: August 9, 1967

Government
  - Type: Mayor-council

Area
  - Total: 2.22 sq mi (5.76 km^{2})
  - Land: 2.22 sq mi (5.74 km^{2})
  - Water: 0.012 sq mi (0.03 km^{2})
- Elevation: 1,348 ft (411 m)

Population (2020)
  - Total: 3,015
  - Density: 1,250.8/sq mi (482.94/km^{2})
- Time zone: UTC-6 (Central (CST))
  - Summer (DST): UTC-5 (CDT)
- ZIP Code: 72764
- Area code: 479
- FIPS code: 05-05740
- GNIS feature ID: 0076320
- Website: web.archive.org/web/20200803201257/http://www.bethelheightsark.org/

Bethel Heights was a city in Benton County, Arkansas, United States. Always a small, sparsely populated community, the region coalesced around a school named Bethel in the late 19th century but did not incorporate until 1967 to avoid annexation by larger neighboring communities. The town offered police and fire protection and wastewater service to residents, but sent students to Springdale Public Schools and purchased water from Springdale Water Utilities. By the 21st century, Northwest Arkansas was gaining population rapidly, and Bethel Heights reincorporated as a city and grew from a population of 714 in 2000 to 2,372 at the 2010 census. As of the 2020 census, Bethel Heights had a population of 3,015. Growth put pressure on the city's subsurface discharge wastewater treatment system, and following a series of wastewater treatment plant violations, voters dissolved the city and completely annexed into Springdale in August 2020.

== History ==
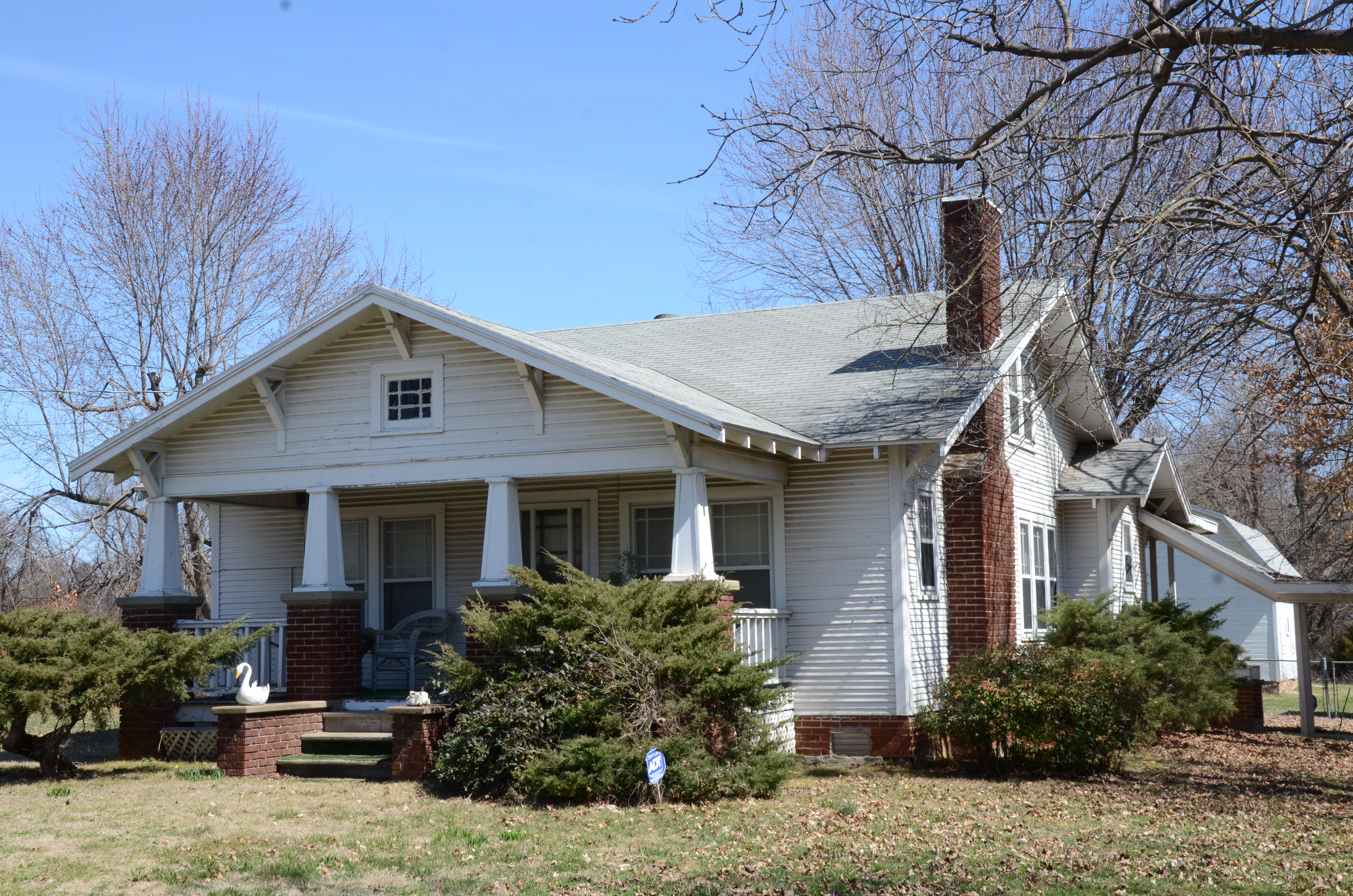
The Beasley Homestead was built in the 1920s and remains as an example of farmsteads from the period

Present-day Benton County was hunted by the Osage prior to, and after, the Louisiana Purchase. Following the Treaty of Fort Clark and establishment of Lovely County, white settlement in the area began. Settlers around Bethel Heights started claiming land in 1856.

As the communities of Lowell and Springdale expanded toward the Bethel area, residents incorporated as a town in 1967 to prevent annexation.

== Geography ==
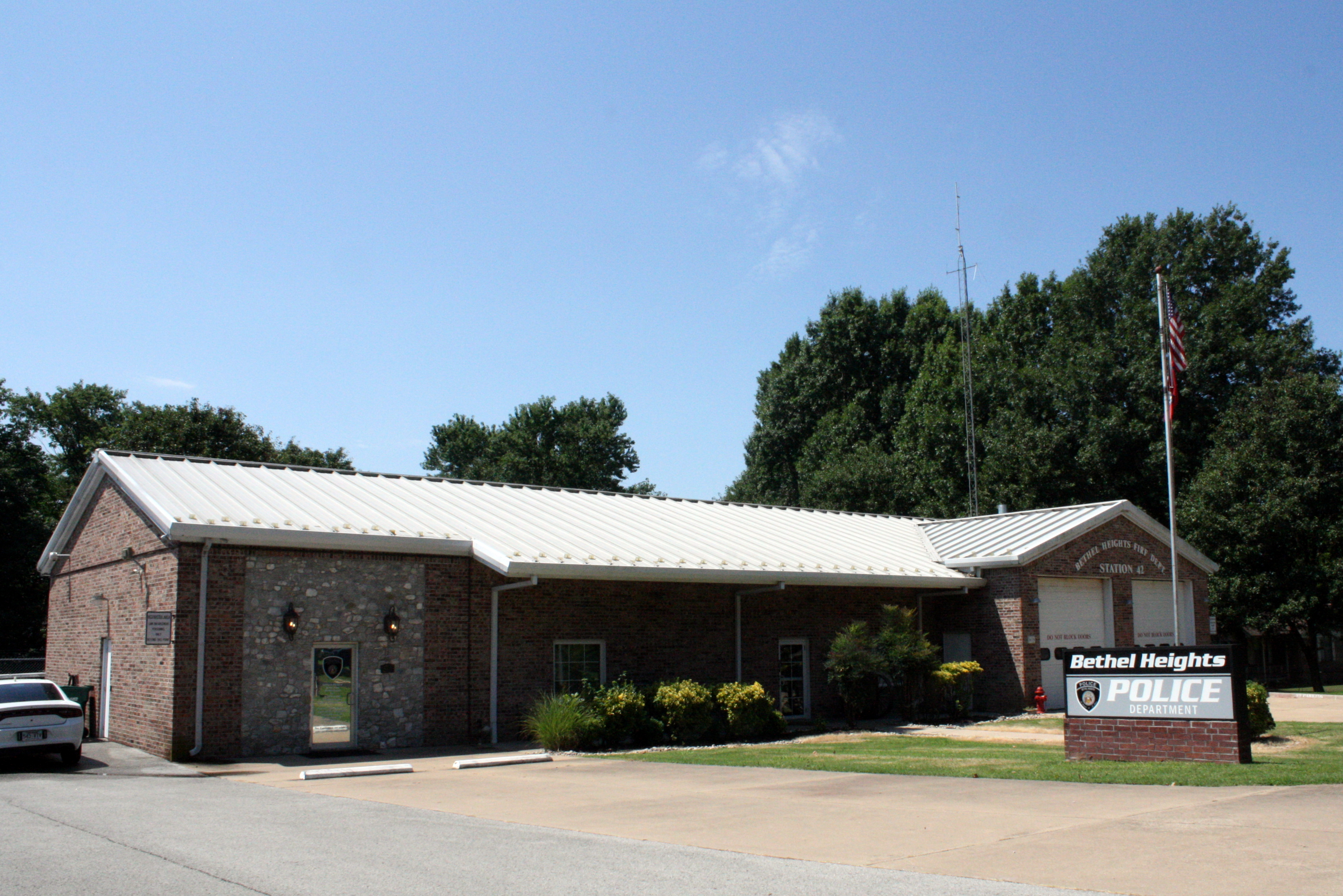
Fire and Police Station

Bethel Heights was located in southern Benton County at 36°13′22″N 94°7′40″W (36.222843, -94.127671). It was bordered by Springdale to the east, south, and west, and by Lowell to the north. U.S. Route 71 Business (US 71B, Thompson Street) ran north–south along the western side of the city, and Highway 264 ran east–west through the center of the city.

According to the United States Census Bureau, the city had a total area of 2.4 square miles (6.2 km^{2}), of which 0.015 square miles (0.04 km^{2}), or 0.69%, is water.

=== Region ===
The Northwest Arkansas region consists of three Arkansas counties: Benton, Madison, and Washington. The area had a population of 347,045 at the 2000 census which had increased to 463,204 by the 2010 Census (an increase of 33.47 percent). The region does not consist of the usual principal-city-with-suburbs morphology. The principal cities retain individual identities, but have grown together along Interstate 49 (I-49). For more than the last decade, Northwest Arkansas has been one of the fastest-growing regions in the United States.

== Demographics ==
Historical population
Census	Pop.	Note	%±
1970	284		—
1980	296		4.2%
1990	281		−5.1%
2000	714		154.1%
2010	2,372		232.2%
2020	3,015		27.1%
U.S. Decennial Census; 2014 Estimate

=== Racial and ethnic composition ===
Bethel Heights city, Arkansas – Racial composition Note: the US Census treats Hispanic/Latino as an ethnic category. This table excludes Latinos from the racial categories and assigns them to a separate category. Hispanics/Latinos may be of any race.
Race (NH = Non-Hispanic)	% 2020	% 2010	% 2000	Pop 2020	Pop 2010	Pop 2000
White alone (NH)	36.1%	49.7%	91.2%	1,087	1,179	651
Black alone (NH)	1.8%	1.9%	0%	53	46	0
American Indian alone (NH)	0.5%	0.7%	1.5%	15	17	11
Asian alone (NH)	3.3%	3%	2.5%	98	72	18
Pacific Islander alone (NH)	10.2%	8.3%	0%	309	196	0
Other race alone (NH)	0.2%	0%	0%	5	1	0
Multiracial (NH)	3.4%	1.6%	1.4%	102	38	10
Hispanic/Latino (any race)	44.6%	34.7%	3.4%	1,346	823	24

=== 2020 census ===
As of the 2020 census, Bethel Heights had a population of 3,015. The median age was 28.6 years. 34.9% of residents were under the age of 18 and 7.1% of residents were 65 years of age or older. For every 100 females there were 96.8 males, and for every 100 females age 18 and over there were 95.2 males age 18 and over.

97.7% of residents lived in urban areas, while 2.3% lived in rural areas.

There were 828 households in Bethel Heights, of which 54.5% had children under the age of 18 living in them. Of all households, 61.6% were married-couple households, 12.9% were households with a male householder and no spouse or partner present, and 17.8% were households with a female householder and no spouse or partner present. About 10.9% of all households were made up of individuals and 3.9% had someone living alone who was 65 years of age or older.

There were 875 housing units, of which 5.4% were vacant. The homeowner vacancy rate was 3.6% and the rental vacancy rate was 2.2%.

The most reported ancestries were Mexican (29.8%), English (11.8%), Marshallese (10%), Salvadoran (8.7%), German (6.7%), and Irish (6.1%).

=== 2010 census ===
As of 2010 Bethel Heights had a population of 2,372. The racial and ethnic composition of the population was 49.7% non-Hispanic white, 1.9% black or African American, 1.4% Native American, 3.0% Asian, 8.3% Pacific Islander, 21.6% from some other race, 2.2% from two or more races, and 34.7% Hispanic or Latino.

=== 2000 census ===
As of the census of 2000, there were 714 people, 251 households, and 211 families residing in the town. The population density was 109.4 people/km^{2} (283 people/mi^{2}). There were 261 housing units at an average density of 40.0 units/km^{2} (104 units/mi^{2}). The racial makeup of the town was 92.16% White, 1.54% Native American, 2.52% Asian, 1.82% from other races, and 1.96% from two or more races. 3.36% of the population were Hispanic or Latino of any race.

There were 251 households, out of which 42.6% had children under the age of 18 living with them, 78.1% were married couples living together, 3.2% had a female householder with no husband present, and 15.9% were non-families. 13.9% of all households were made up of individuals, and 7.2% had someone living alone who was 65 years of age or older. The average household size was 2.84 and the average family size was 3.10.

The city's population was spread out, with 28.6% under the age of 18, 5.2% from 18 to 24, 31.0% from 25 to 44, 24.2% from 45 to 64, and 11.1% who were 65 years of age or older. The median age was 35 years. For every 100 females, there were 103.4 males. For every 100 females age 18 and over, there were 103.2 males.

The median income for a household in the town was $48,750, and the median income for a family was $51,172. Males had a median income of $33,438 versus $26,625 for females. The per capita income for the town was $19,001. About 1.9% of families and 4.9% of the population were below the poverty line, including 1.8% of those under age 18 and 11.4% of those age 65 or over.

== Education ==
The majority of the former city of Bethel Heights is zoned for Springdale Public Schools while small sections are zoned to Rogers Public Schools.

The Bethel Heights area (the former municipality) in 2022, was zoned to the following: Bayyari, Hunt, and Monitor elementary schools take certain portions. Hellstern, Sonora, and Helen Tyson middle schools take certain portions. Central, Lakeside, and Southwest junior high schools take certain portions. Springdale High School and Har-Ber High School take certain portions of Bethel Heights.

Bethel Heights, in 2006, was divided between Bayyari, Hunt, and Lee elementary schools. It was also divided between Hellstern, J.O. Kelly, and Helen Tyson middle schools, and between Central, Southwest, and George junior high schools. Most of Bethel Heights was zoned to Springdale High, but with portions west of U.S. Route 71 zoned to Har-Ber.

Early residents established Benton County School District #66, and a small school known as Bethel or New Kirk, around Bethel Heights in the late 19th century. This school remained independent until consolidation with Springdale Public Schools in 1948. In 2018, Springdale Public Schools became the largest school district in the state with over 23,000 students. Bethel Heights students were zoned for graduation from Springdale High School.

== Government and politics ==
=== Mayor–city council ===
Bethel Heights operated within the mayor-city council form of government. At founding as a town, Bethel Heights had a town council consisting of five aldermen elected at-large as the town's unicameral legislature. Mayors served an unlimited number of four-year terms. The mayor was elected by a citywide election to serve as the chief executive officer (CEO) of the city by presiding over all city functions and allocated duties to city employees. Bethel Heights also elected a recorder and treasurer to two-year terms.

In the early 2000s, Bethel Heights became a second-class city, requiring the establishment of wards. Two council members were elected to two-year terms from each of the city's three wards to establish an annual budget and consider ordinances. Council meetings were held on the third Tuesday of each month at 7:00 p.m. at City Hall, 530 Sunrise Drive. On August 21, 2020, Bethel Heights was annexed by Springdale.

== Infrastructure ==
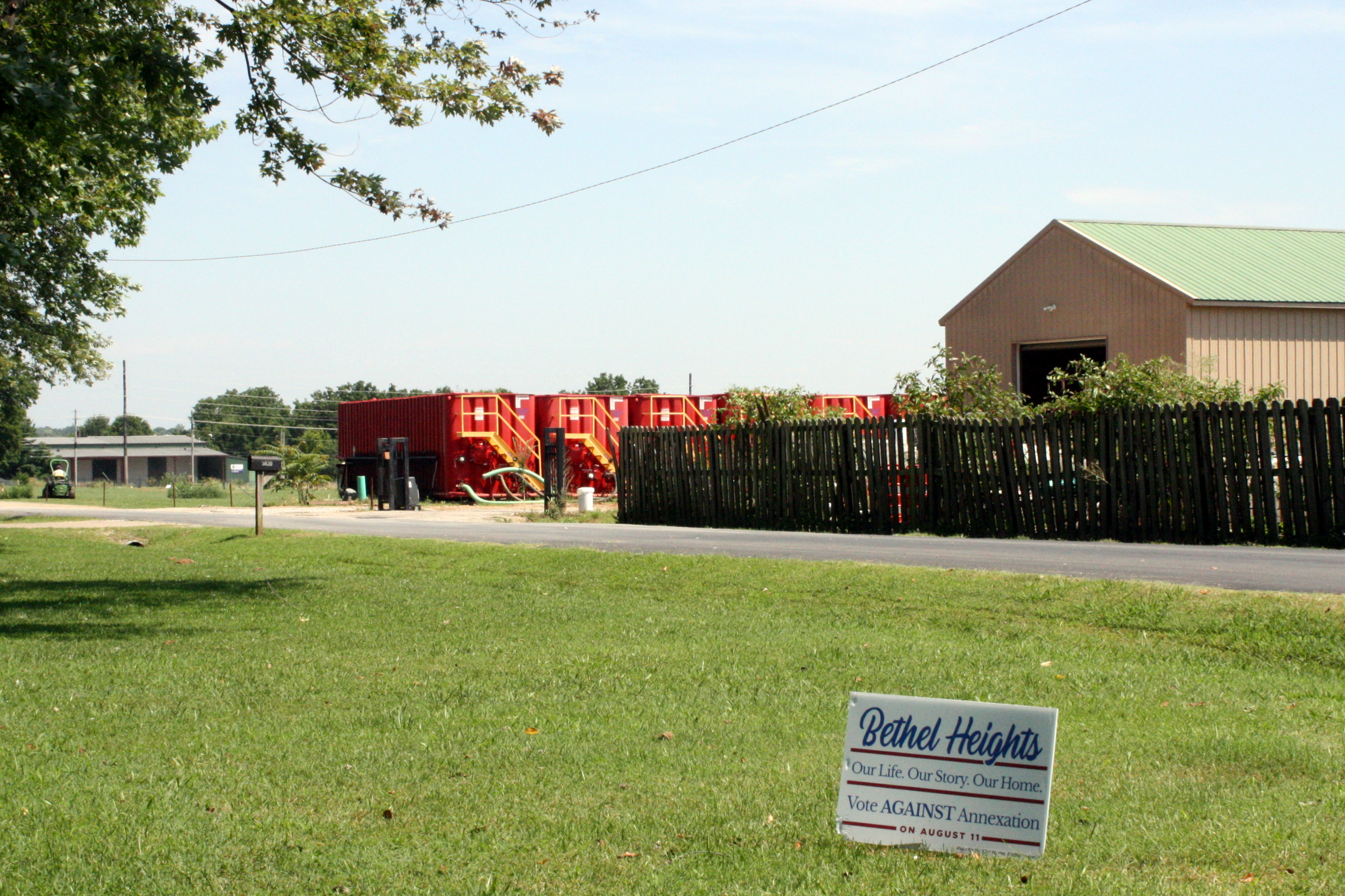
A yard sign urges opposition to the city's consolidation with Springdale across the street from emergency sewage treatment units installed on Bethel Heights city property in response to court orders.

=== Utilities ===
The City provided wastewater service via a STEP system, installed in 2003. Bethel Heights struggled to maintain compliance with Arkansas Department of Health and Arkansas Department of Environmental Quality regulations. The system was out of compliance from August 2013 to January 2017, with sewage surfacing in neighbors' fields, livestock poisonings, multiple violations and fines resulting in a consent administrative order. Violations had continued in 2018 and 2019.

Potable water service was provided by Springdale Water Utilities. Following the sewer system violations, a moratorium on new water system connections was established in June 2019.

American Electric Power (AEP/SWEPCO) and Carroll Electric Cooperative provided electric power in Bethel Heights. Franchise utilities that served the community include AT&T, Black Hills Energy, and Cox Communications.
