= Wilson Park Historic District =

Historic district in Arkansas, United States

- U.S. National Register of Historic Places
- U.S. Historic district
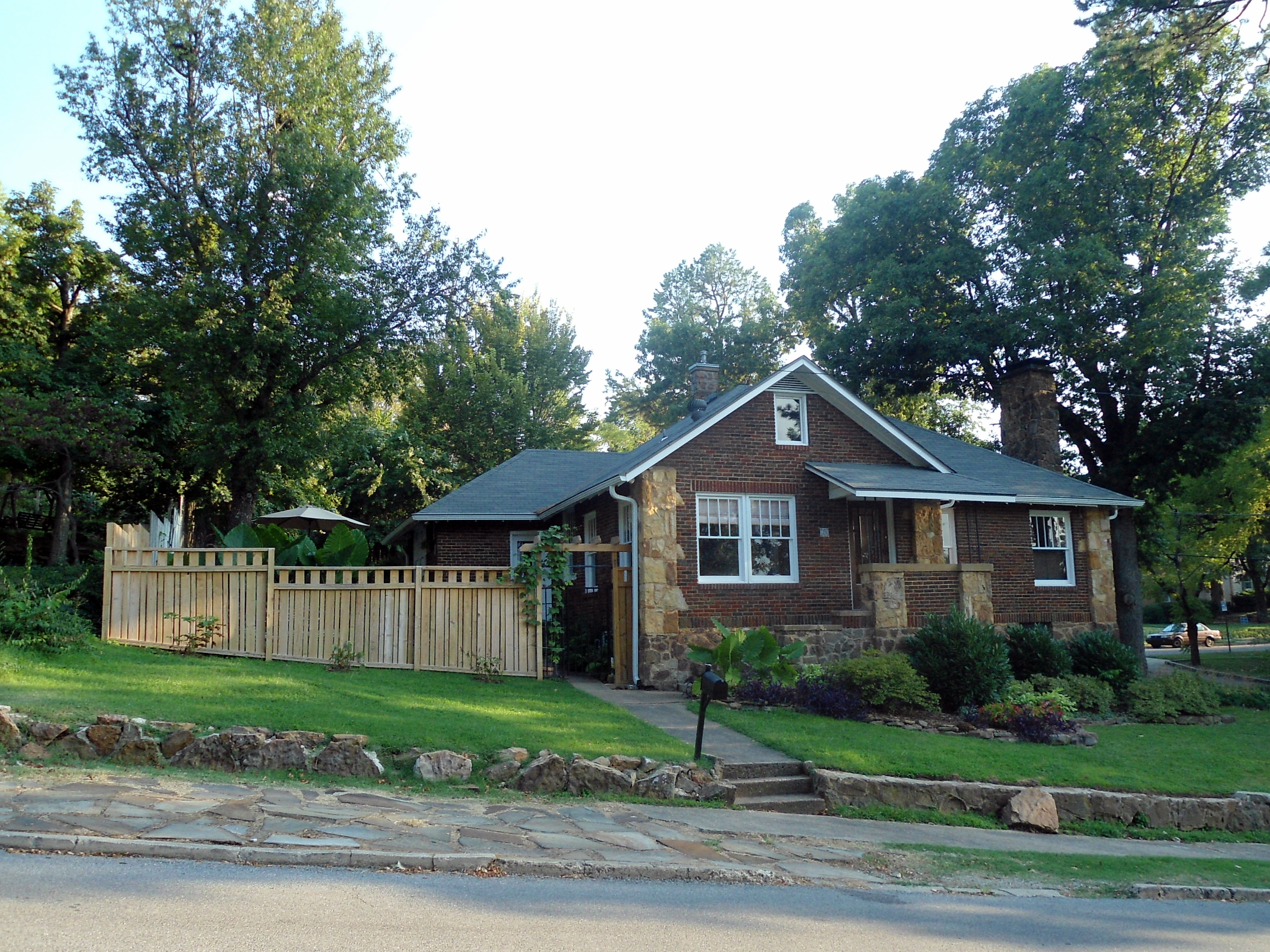
- 25 Davidson Street, a contributing property in the Wilson Park Historic District, August 2012

- Location within Arkansas Location within the United States
- Location: Roughly bounded by College Ave., Maple St., Wilson Ave. and Louise St., Fayetteville, Arkansas
- Coordinates: 36.07094°N 94.16173°W
- Area: 38 acres (15 ha)
- Built: 1900
- Architectural style: Late 19th And Early 20th Century American Movements, American Foursquare
- NRHP reference No.: 95000365
- Added to NRHP: March 31, 1995

The Wilson Park Historic District (sometimes Rock House Historic District) is a historic district in Fayetteville, Arkansas, USA, located just northeast of the University of Arkansas. The district consists of several residential buildings that developed during the late 19th and early 20th Century near Wilson Park just north of Dickson Street, the city's primary entertainment district. Wilson Park Historic District includes 47 contributing buildings.

== Location ==
The Wilson Park Historic District is located directly south of Wilson Park in Fayetteville north of the Fayetteville Historic Square and northeast of the University of Arkansas. It is bounded on the south by Maple Street and contains homes on both sides of Ila Street from Highland Avenue on the east and Vandeventer Avenue to the west. A few additional contributing properties are located along Davidson Street, along the eastern boundary of the district.

== See also ==
- Mount Nord Historic District
- University of Arkansas Campus Historic District
- West Dickson Street Commercial Historic District
- National Register of Historic Places listings in Washington County, Arkansas
