= Fayetteville Public Library =

Library in Fayetteville, Arkansas, United States

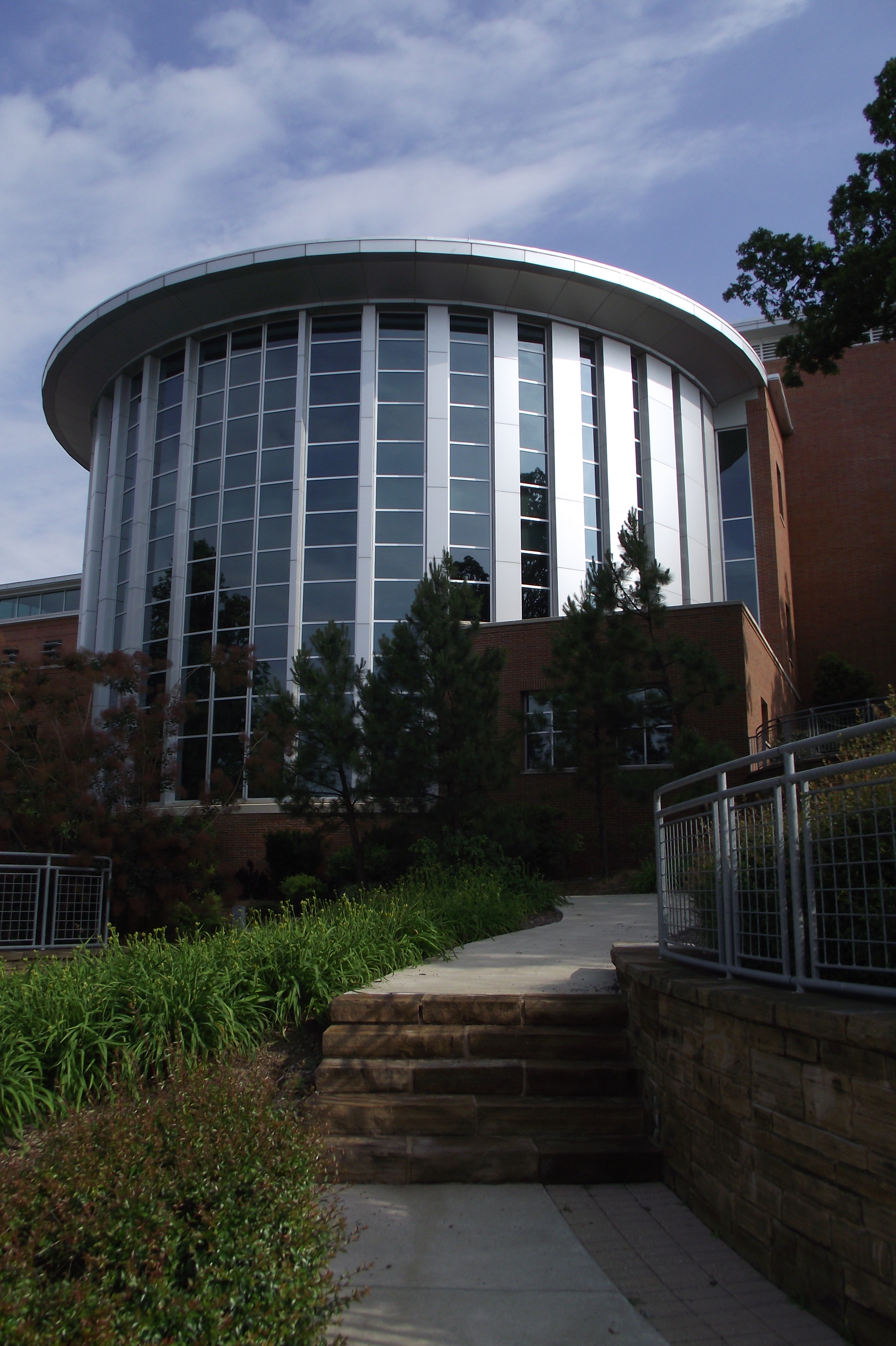
- 36°3′42″N 94°9′53″W
- Location: Fayetteville, Arkansas, United States of America
- Type: Public
- Established: 1916
- Branch of: None, formerly Washington County Library System

Collection
- Items collected: Books, audio books, CDs, DVDs, videos, maps, e-books, parenting kits
- Size: 245,000 items

Access and use
- Access requirements: Resident of Washington County, Bentonville, or Rogers
- Circulation: 1,000,000+

Other information
- Director: David Johnson
- Employees: 103
- Website: http://faylib.org/

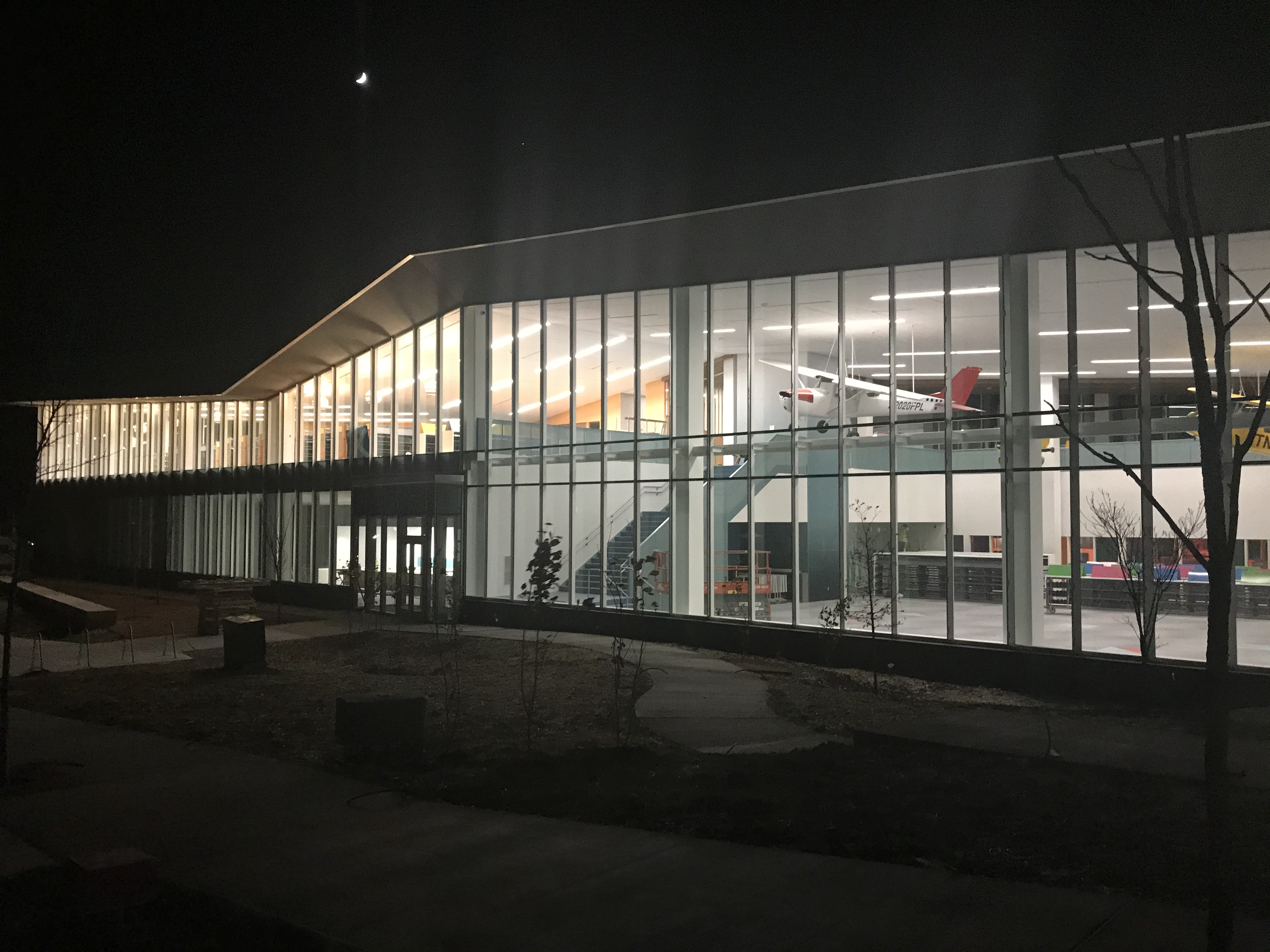
Fayetteville Public Library's expansion, seen here at night.

The Fayetteville Public Library (also Blair Library and FPL) is a library in Fayetteville, Arkansas. The Leadership in Energy and Environmental Design (LEED) silver-certified library was named "Library of the Year" in 2005 by Library Journal and an "American Landmark Library" by TravelSmart.

== History ==
Fayetteville Public Library was first created in 1916 and was housed in the brand-new Washington County Courthouse. The library was contained in two rooms in the basement of the building. The building quickly became too small, and the Fayetteville Public Library moved to the City Administration Building in 1937 along with several other city offices. This building became too small following Fayetteville's rapid post-World War II growth.

Residents began fundraising for a new building, and a site on East Dickson Street was tapped by the City of Fayetteville in 1959. A funding measure of $255,000 was approved for the site, with architect Warren Segraves in charge of the design. Built at the edge of the Washington-Willow Historic District, the site was dedicated on June 4, 1962 by Senator J. William Fulbright. The plot to the east was purchased in 1966 and the plot to the west in 1989. The building on the west plot was connected to the library, forming a large facility of 31,500 square feet (2,930 m^{2}). This large building held the FPL, the Ozark Regional Library System and the Talking Books service.

The Ozark Regional Library System split into the Washington County Library System (WCLS) and the Benton County Library System in 1999, and the WCLS left the FPL building the following year. Also in 2000 Fayetteville citizens approved a sales tax increase to build a new library. A significant contribution of $3 million from Jim Blair in honor of his late wife, grandmother, and aunt was announced in 2002, and ground was broken two months later. The 88,000 square feet (8,200 m^{2}) building was opened in September 2004 at a cost of $23 million.

== Building ==
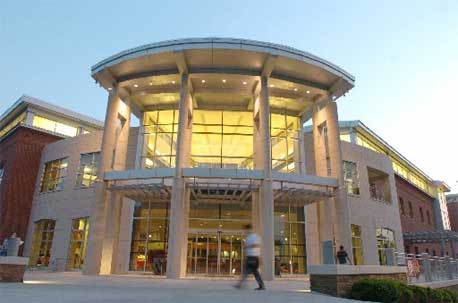
Fayetteville Public Library main entrance

Fayetteville Public Library was designed by Meyer, Scherer and Rockcastle, Ltd. of Minneapolis and was opened in October 2004. The library was the first building in Arkansas to register with the U.S. Green Building Council, in June 2001, and achieved the silver LEED designation in 2006. To earn this designation the library employed many green-design techniques. The library was built a few blocks away from the Fayetteville Historic Square, making it a textbook smart growth project. During construction, any trees removed were harvested and used for furniture or donated to local parks. Throughout the project, almost 99% of the construction waste was recycled or reused. By incorporating a green roof and using alternative roofing materials, the design team reduced heat island effect by as much as 20 degrees. Water collected on the roof is reused for landscape irrigation through an underground cistern, saving about 500,000 US gallons (1,900,000 L) of water a year. The library's 10 waterless urinals served as a successful pilot project for the Arkansas Department of Health and Human Services. In 2009, the library received a grant from the City / County Management Association to install 10 kW solar panels for energy generation.

In 2013, the Fayetteville Library Board of Directors approved a master plan recommending expansion of the Blair Library to meet the community’s library need of the future. In 2021, the expansion was complete and brought the total size of the library to 170,500 square feet. The expansion includes an event center that seats more than 700 people, an innovation center, a teaching kitchen, an art and movement room, as well as spaces for children and teenagers.
