= Washington County Courthouse (Arkansas) =

Courthouse in Arkansas

- U.S. National Register of Historic Places
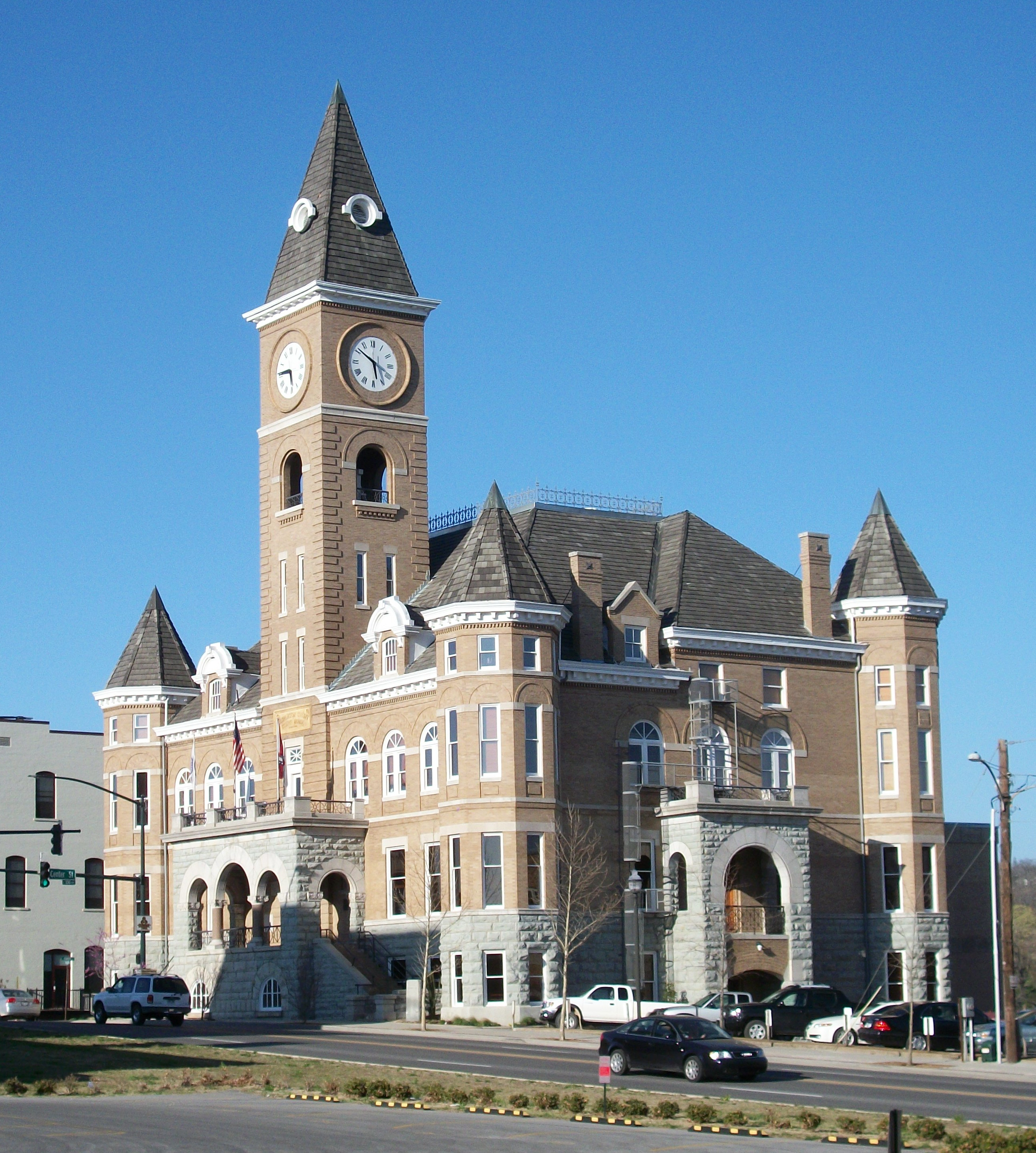
- Historic Washington County Courthouse, in 2011

- Location within Arkansas Location within the United States
- Interactive map showing the location of Washington County Courthouse
- Location: 4 South College Avenue, Fayetteville, Arkansas
- Coordinates: 36°3′45″N 94°9′27″W
- Area: 1.5 acres (0.61 ha)
- Built: 1905
- Built by: George Donaghey
- Architect: Charles L. Thompson
- Architectural style: Romanesque, Richardsonian Romanesque
- NRHP reference No.: 72000212
- Added to NRHP: February 23, 1972

The Washington County Courthouse is the name of a current courthouse and that of a historic one in Fayetteville, Arkansas, the county seat of Washington County. The historic building, built in 1905, was listed on the National Register of Historic Places in 1972. The historic courthouse is the fifth building to serve Washington County, with the prior buildings located on the Historic Square where the Old Post Office is today. The building is one of the prominent historic buildings that compose the Fayetteville skyline, in addition to Old Main.

A new building was acquired in 1989 to better serve Washington County's county administration needs. The present-day courthouse is located at the intersection of College Avenue and Dickson Street, just north of historic building. Most county offices are located in the new building, with the historic courthouse serving as a repository for county records.

== History ==
Washington County was established on October 17, 1828 by the Arkansas General Assembly. The county seat was established at Washington, which was later renamed Fayetteville after confusion with Washington, Arkansas in South Arkansas.

=== Planning ===
This historic courthouse first became a reality when County Judge Millard Berry was elected into office in 1900. He was aware of the need for a new courthouse, and when the Courthouse and Jail Committee of the Levying Court deemed the current 1868 brick courthouse "unfitted for the business of the county, unsafe and not worthy of repair", the Judge proposed raising money for a new building. In 1902, the City of Fayetteville passed a resolution giving $5,000 to the Courthouse Sinking Fund in exchange for office space within the new building, a 99-year rental of the Fayetteville Public Square, and an agreement to build the courthouse 1½ blocks away from the Square. The courthouse was eventually built along the former Butterfield Overland Mail route near a former stagecoach stop. The route had been instrumental in growing Fayetteville in the mid–1800s.

Judge Berry fell ill with typhoid fever while investigating surrounding Arkansas and Missouri courthouses, and appointed J.H. McIlroy to proceed with the building. In 1904, McIlroy acquired the services of Little Rock architect Charles L. Thompson, who had already worked on many buildings in the Little Rock area. The budget for the courthouse was increased to $100,000, but was contracted for slightly less to George Donaghey of Conway.

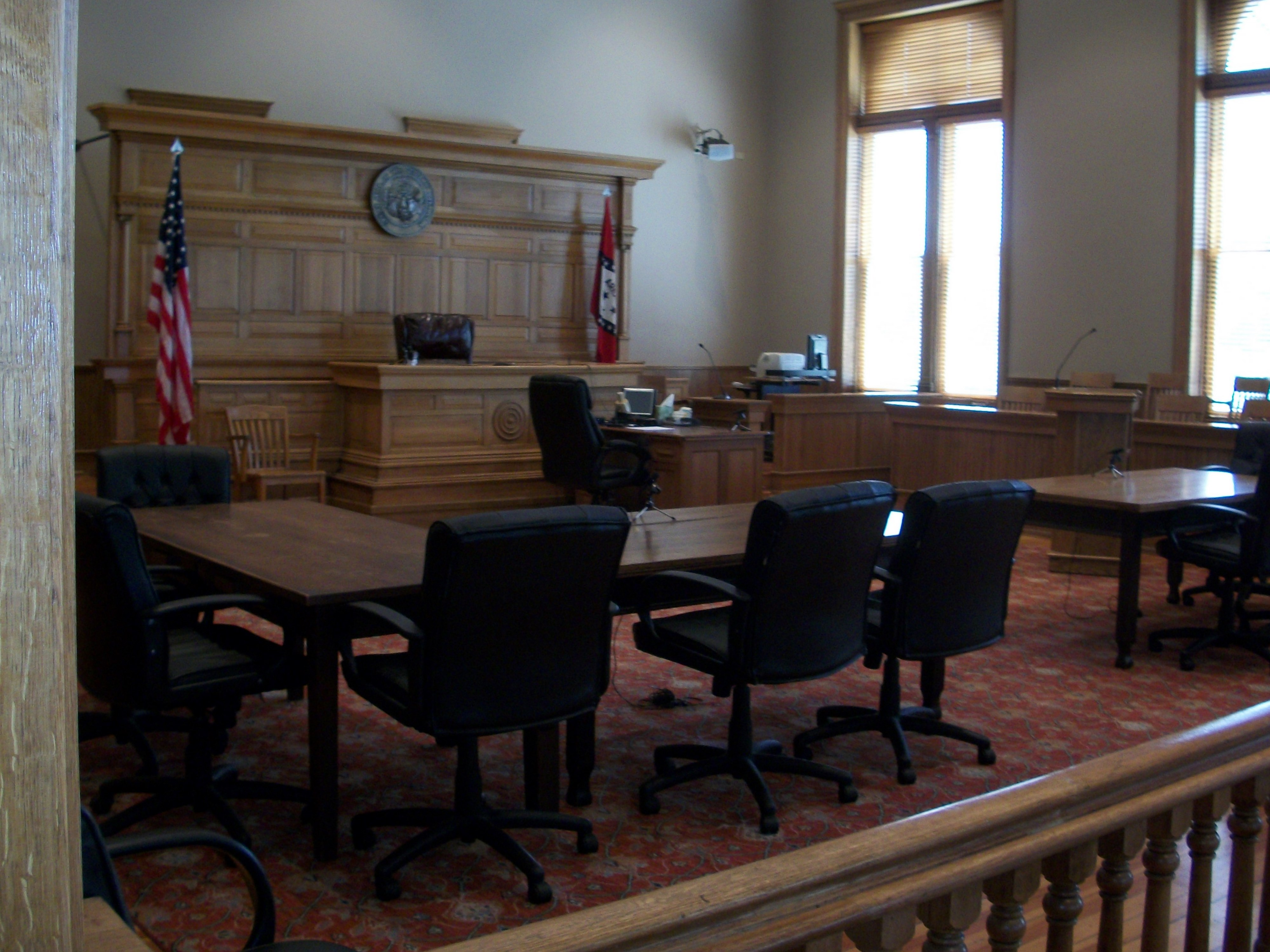
Courtroom in which circuit court first met in April 1905.

=== Construction ===
The cornerstone was laid on October 1, 1904, with over 2,000 people attending the ceremony. A time capsule, containing coins, documents and newspapers was also set. Limestone was brought in from Carroll and Madison Counties, furniture and carpets were purchased from the People's Furniture Store of Fayetteville, a water system was installed by Fayetteville Water Company, and a new septic system was installed by Duggan Brothers. Smoking was prohibited, and spittoons were placed throughout in the interest of preserving the building. A typewriter was used for record keeping. Circuit court first met in the courthouse in April 1905, weeks prior to the official opening on May 4.

=== Early use ===
The courthouse had many construction problems in its early years, including the closing of the hydraulic elevator, rotting of basement floorboards, birds in the bell tower, and eventually too many occupants. After relations and space grew tighter, the County Judge ordered the sheriff to evict all City of Fayetteville workers from their offices in 1927. The city appealed to the Circuit Judge, who sided with the county. The Fayetteville-occupied offices were emptied by 1928, but structural problems continued to plague the building. After repairing the roof three times in the 1920s, the courthouse's structural problems began to fall out of official record. The 1934 Quorum Court meetings took place in the Arkansas National Guard Armory immediately to the south between the courthouse and the County Jail, possibly due to courthouse structural problems kept quiet by the Great Depression.

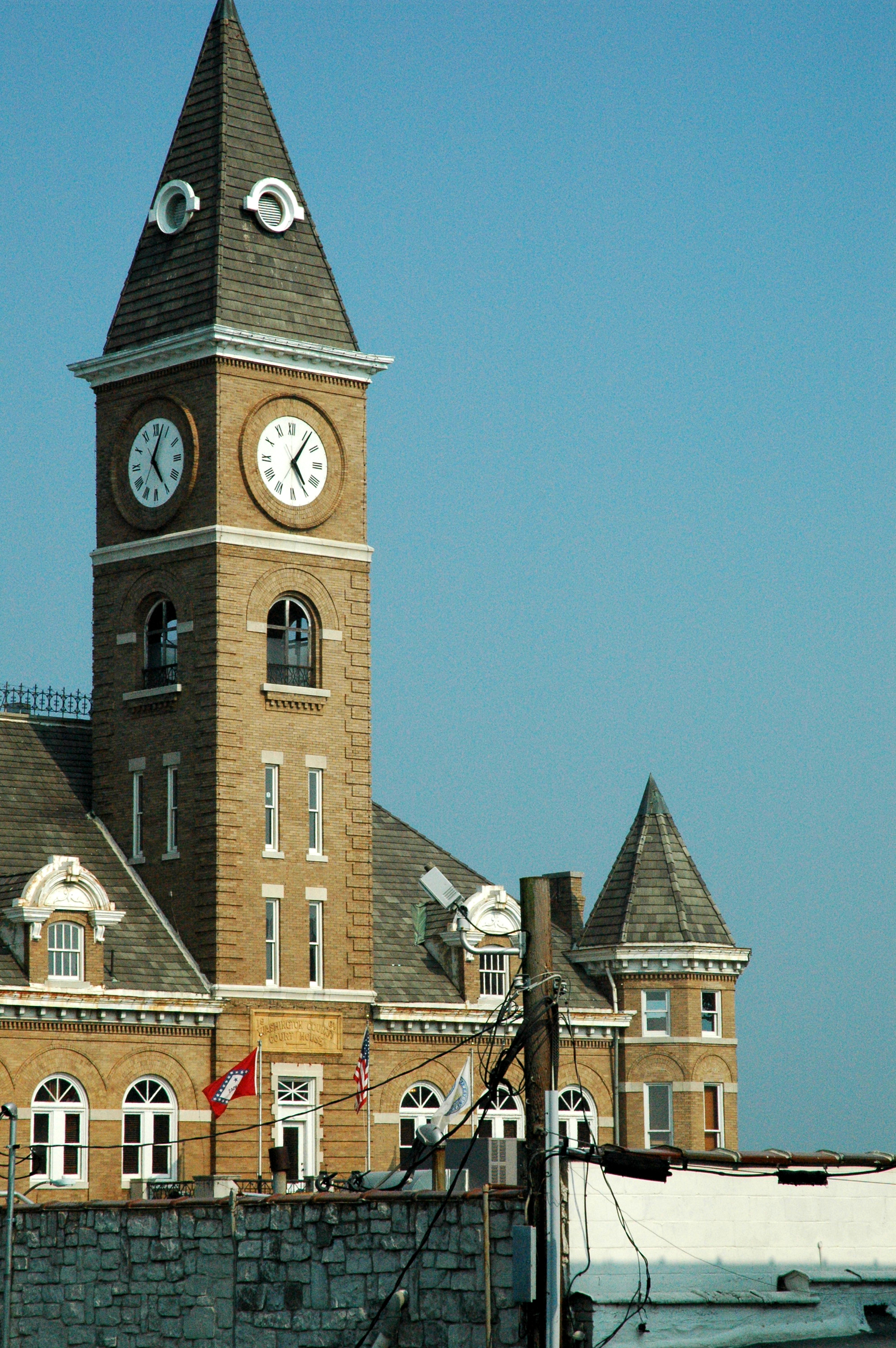
The clock steeple was removed in 1965 and returned by helicopter in 1974. The clock face is now illuminated.

The Works Progress Administration praised the courthouse during a 1936 audit, mentioning the tidy offices and public access to records. The WPA also warned that record space was dwindling, as the vaults were almost full. This was partially due to heroic actions during the Civil War, when county records were stored in a cave near Black Oak while the second courthouse was burned. As a result, Washington County held more records than most counties in the area. A 1945 proposal to construct a new courthouse was voted down by citizens who pointed out that Washington County still owed money to George Donaghey from the 1904 construction, and felt the current building was not being maximized.

County Judge Witt Carter ordered the front steps of the courthouse be moved in 1947 to enable the widening and straightening of College Avenue (U.S. Route 71B). The following year, a grand jury reproached the county for poorly maintaining the structure, including unsanitary bathrooms, fire traps, attic storage, and using the boiler room as storage. The roof was repaired again, and the courthouse again had complaints about too little space.

=== Later use ===
Parking became scarce in the 1950s and County Judge Arthur Martin attempted to raise support for a new courthouse and jail. The grand jury returned to cite a non-fireproof vault, poor heating/cooling systems, dangerous electrical systems, inadequate office space, and records in hallways, outdoor porches, or missing. The following year, the clock tower "steeple" was deemed dangerous and was removed. Washington County purchased the adjacent National Guard Armory in December 1968. The courthouse began incremental improvements under County Judge Vol Lester, who was instrumental to the National Register of Historic Places listing the property in 1972. The county took advantage of federal programs to build a bomb shelter to store county records in the 1970s, which relieved stress on many of the vaults. Despite these improvements, a grand jury report from the 1970s states "the building now resembles a rabbit-warren" and "the Washington County Courthouse in Fayetteville is a disgrace".

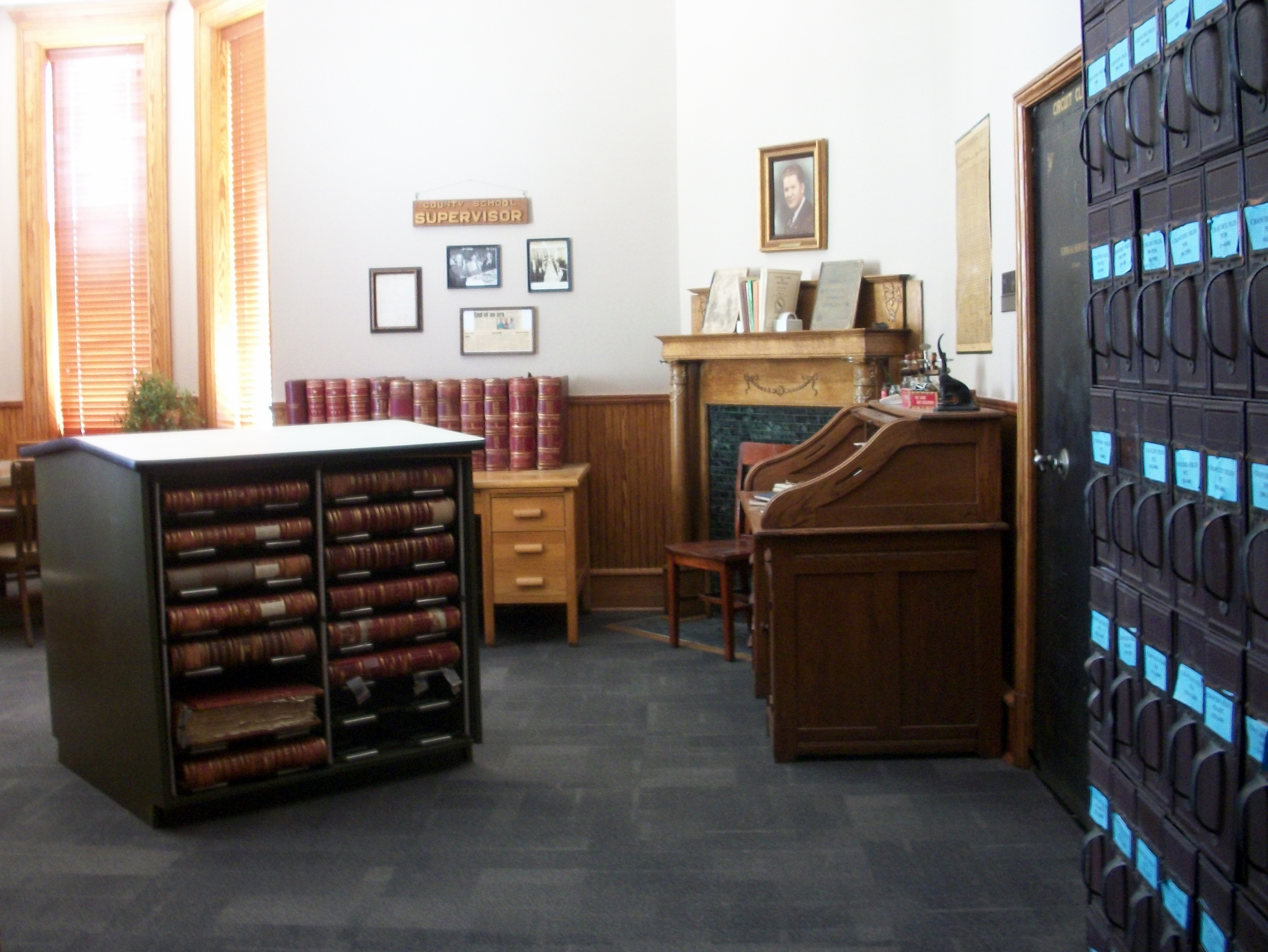
Today, the Washington County Courthouse holds only the county records and a few offices.

The 273rd Aviation Company from Fort Sill, Oklahoma returned the clock tower in 1974, using the largest helicopter in the western world. The fourth floor was renovated into a courtroom, but by 1979, the vaults were again too small. Newly elected County Judge Charles Johnson began large renovations, including brand-new plumbing, and removal of ad hoc offices which had been built in the hallways. An even larger renovation began in 1989 with architecture firm Witsell, Evans & Rosco. On December 12, 1989, the county purchased the First South Centre at 280 North College Avenue for $3.3 million. The First South Centre became the Washington County Courthouse in 1994, and the transition was complete in 1995.

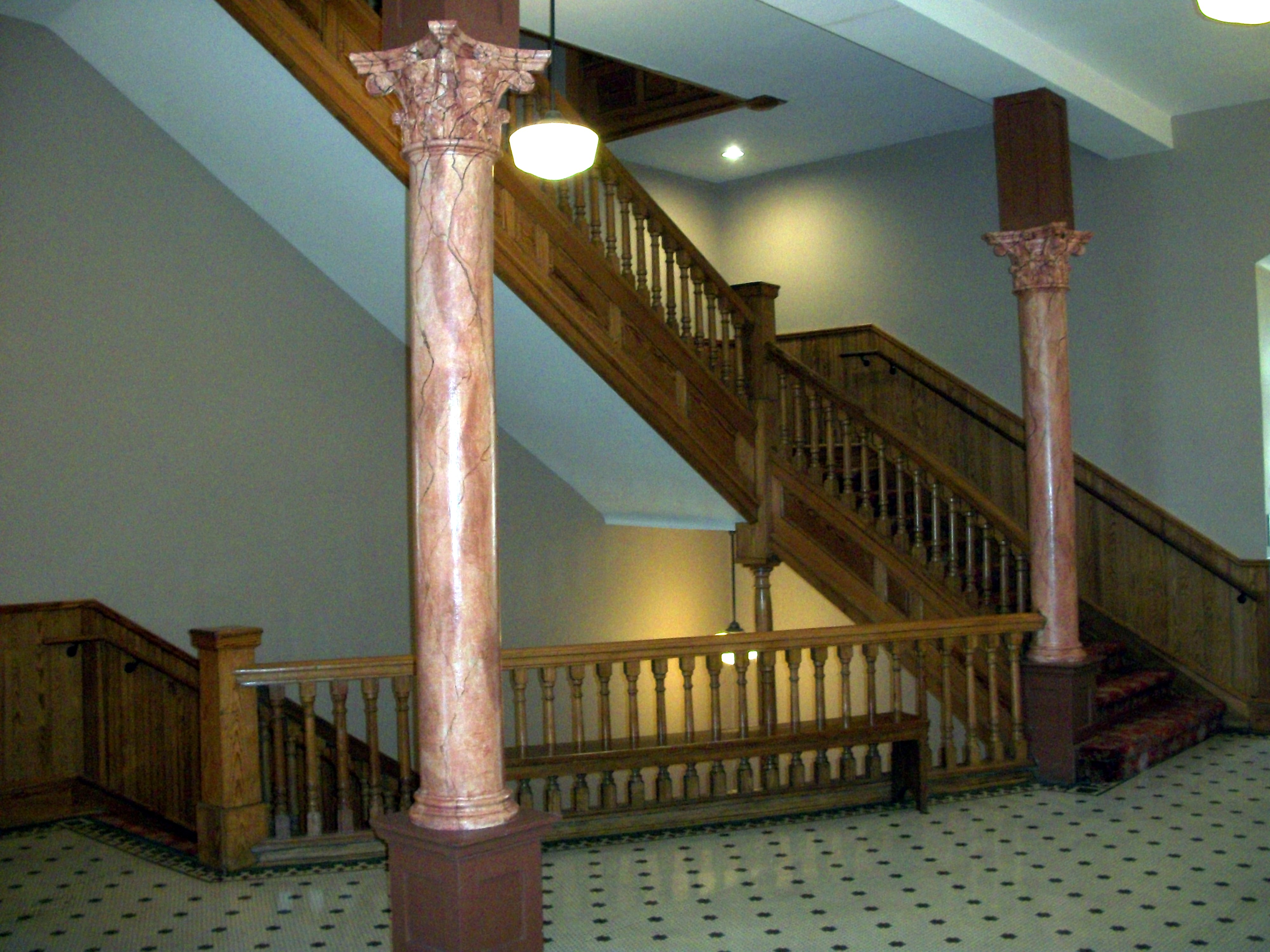
Staircase within the courthouse.

== Architecture ==
The courthouse contains three stories and a basement, a grand staircase, and hydraulic elevator. The basement (first floor) housed the offices promised to the City of Fayetteville, including the mayor. The second floor housed court clerks, the county judge, a vault, and three outdoor porches. The third floor housed a large courtroom with a slanted floor, jury rooms, judge chambers, and a porch. The fourth floor contained a balcony over the courtroom and access to the clock/bell tower. The courthouse features round-top arches over its windows, porches, and grand entrance, round towers with conical roofs, and brickwork, each characteristic of Richardsonian Romanesque architecture. Inside, the building contains glazed brick fireplaces in all offices, and ceramic mosaic floor tiles in all foyers and corridors. There is a mural dedicated to those Washington County persons who died in World War I, completed in 1920 by William Steene. The building also contains the Freedom Shrine, housing replicas of many important freedom documents such as the Mayflower Compact and the Declaration of Independence.

== See also ==
- Washington County, Arkansas
- Old Washington County Jail
- National Register of Historic Places listings in Washington County, Arkansas
- https://www.facebook.com/washingtoncountyar/
