= Downtown Fayetteville Historic Square =

- U.S. National Register of Historic Places
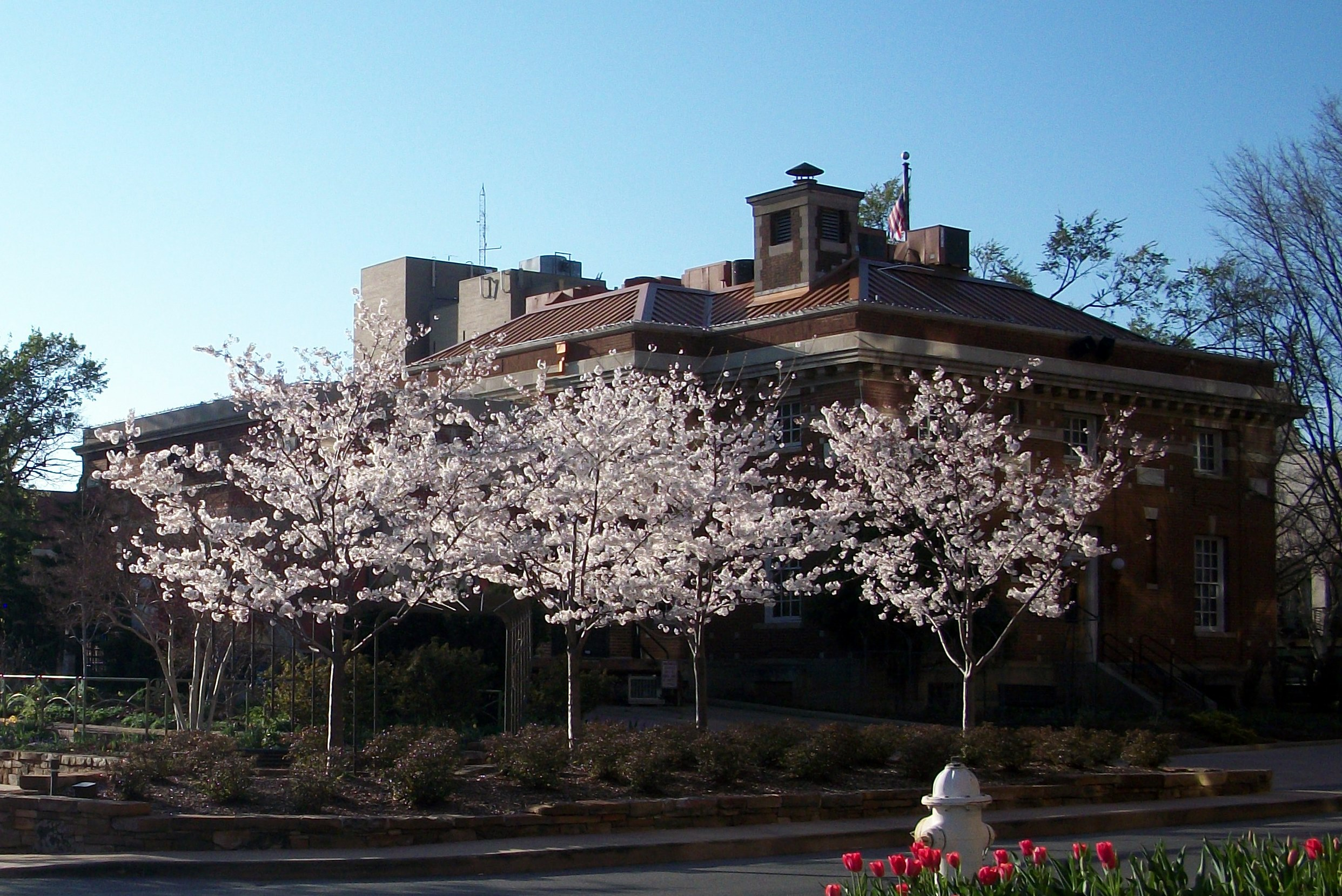
- Old Post Office, located in the center of the Fayetteville Square

- Location within Arkansas Location within the United States
- Location: Downtown Square, Fayetteville, Arkansas
- Coordinates: 36°3′44″N 94°9′35″W
- Area: less than one acre
- Built: 1911
- Architect: James Knox Taylor
- Architectural style: Classical Revival, Renaissance
- NRHP reference No.: 74000503
- Added to NRHP: August 27, 1974

The Downtown Fayetteville Historic Square (usually shortened to Fayetteville Square or just The Square), in Fayetteville, Arkansas, includes the original Fayetteville post office, the Old Bank of Fayetteville Building, the Lewis Brothers Building, the Mrs. Young Building, and the Guisinger Building. These buildings are listed in the National Register of Historic Places. There are several more recent buildings located on the Square.

The downtown historic square is defined by Center Street to the north, Mountain Street to the south, Block Avenue to the west, and East Avenue to the east. The block within these one-way streets contains the Old Post Office, and formerly, the County Courthouse. The broader downtown area is defined by Maple Street to the north, Martin Luther King Jr. Boulevard to the south, University Avenue to the west, and College Avenue to the east.

== Old Post Office ==
The Old Post Office, built in 1911, is the centerpiece of the Historic Square. The lot contained the Washington County Courthouse until 1905, when a new structure was built 1½ blocks away. The building has been renovated and now serves as a restaurant, Cheers at the Old Post Office.

== Old Bank of Fayetteville Building ==
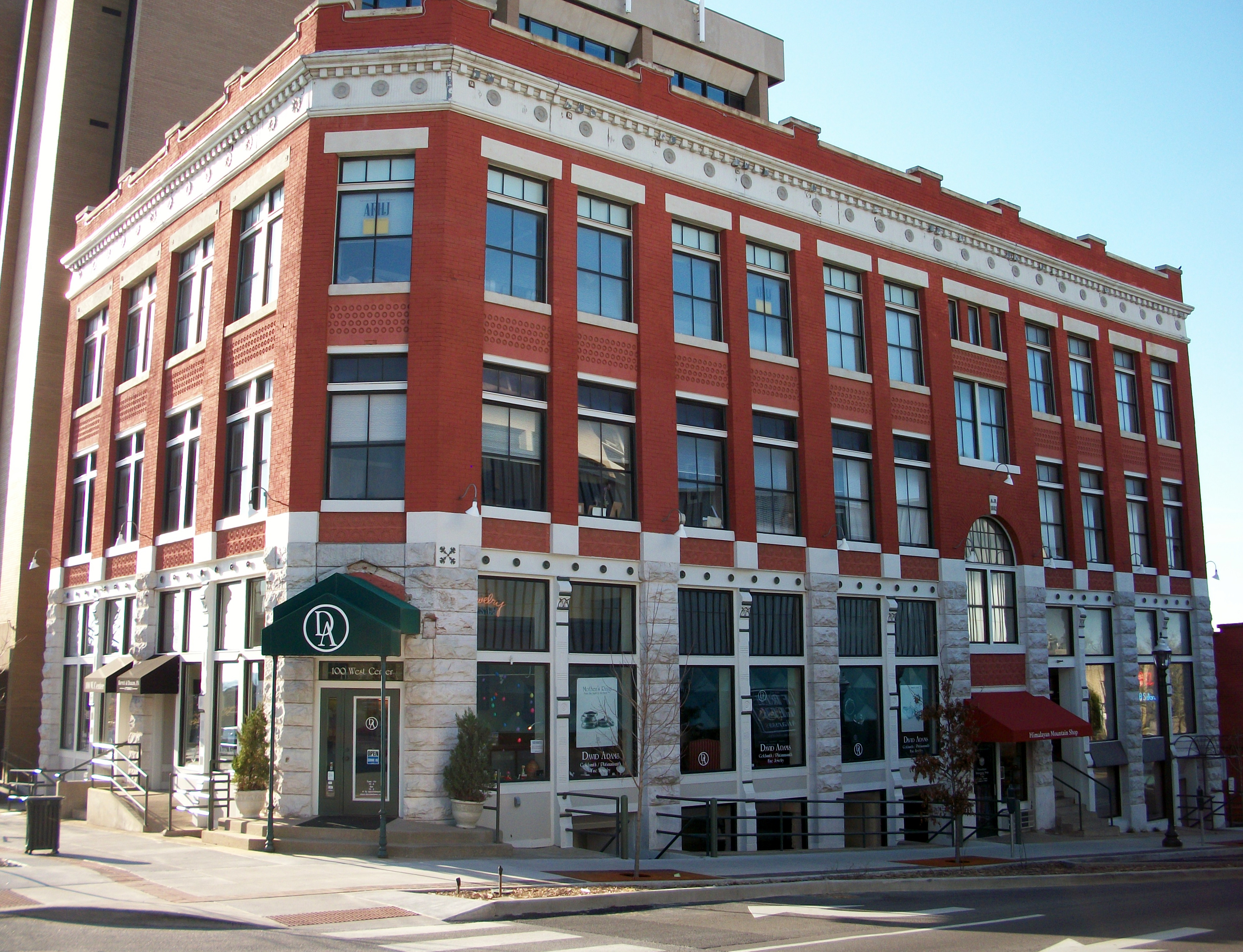
Old Bank of Fayetteville Building

The Old Bank of Fayetteville Building, sometimes called the Eason Building, anchors the northwest corner of the Historic Square. Built in the Queen Anne and Romanesque revival styles, the building held the Bank of Fayetteville and First National Bank upon their merger in 1915. The modern Bank of Fayetteville, located across the street in the Lewis Brothers Building, was founded in 1980, and has no affiliation to the Bank of Fayetteville of the 1915 merger.

== Lewis Brothers Building ==
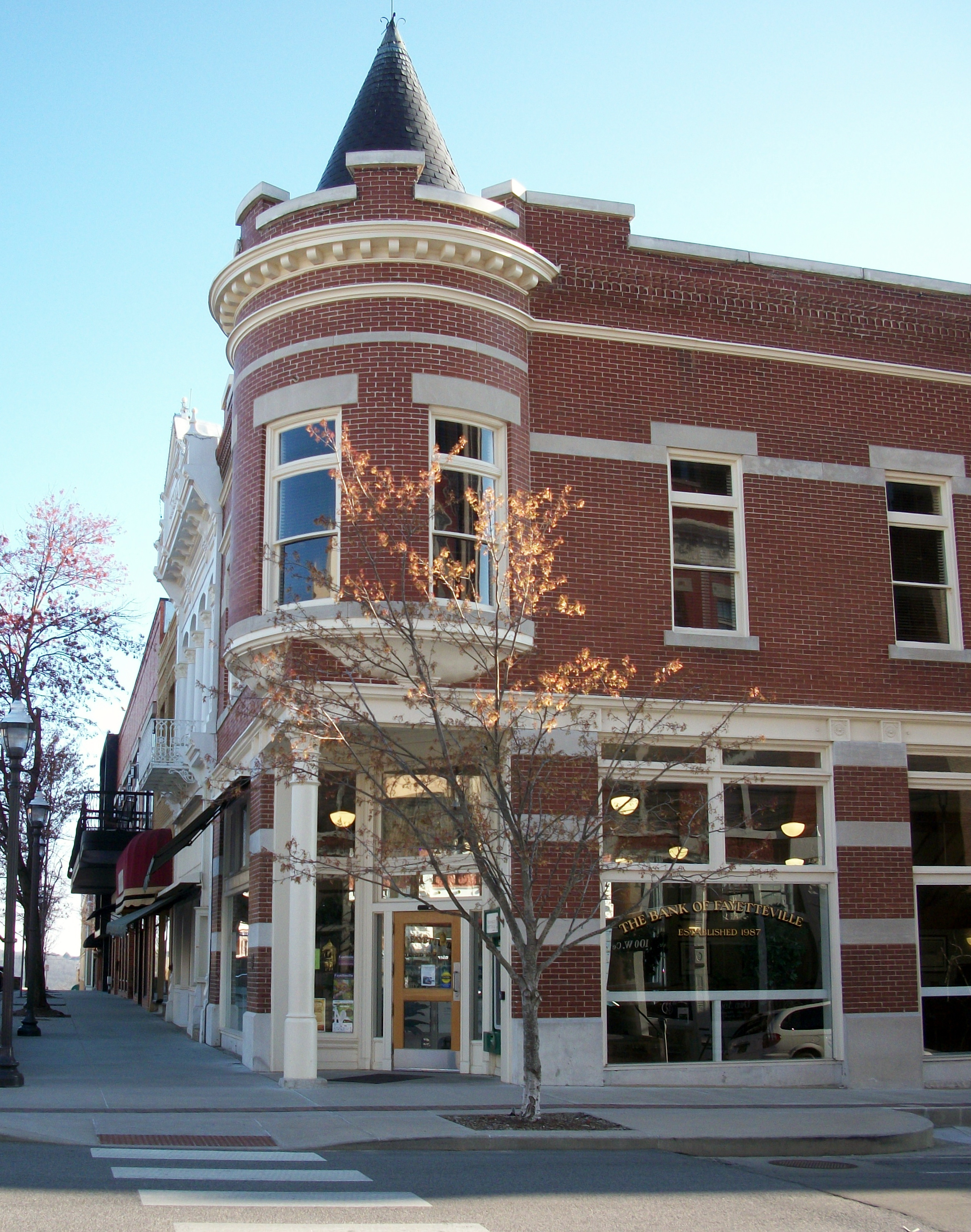
Lewis Brothers Building

The Lewis Brother Building located directly south of the Old Bank Of Fayetteville Building was constructed in 1908. Built in the Queen Anne and Classic revival styles, the building housed the Lewis Brothers Hardware Store from 1912. The hardware store has since closed, and the building now contains the main branch of the modern Bank of Fayetteville ( founded circa 1980, and unaffiliated with the original Bank of Fayetteville ). The brick exterior of the building was filmed in the television program Evening Shade.

== Mrs. Young Building ==
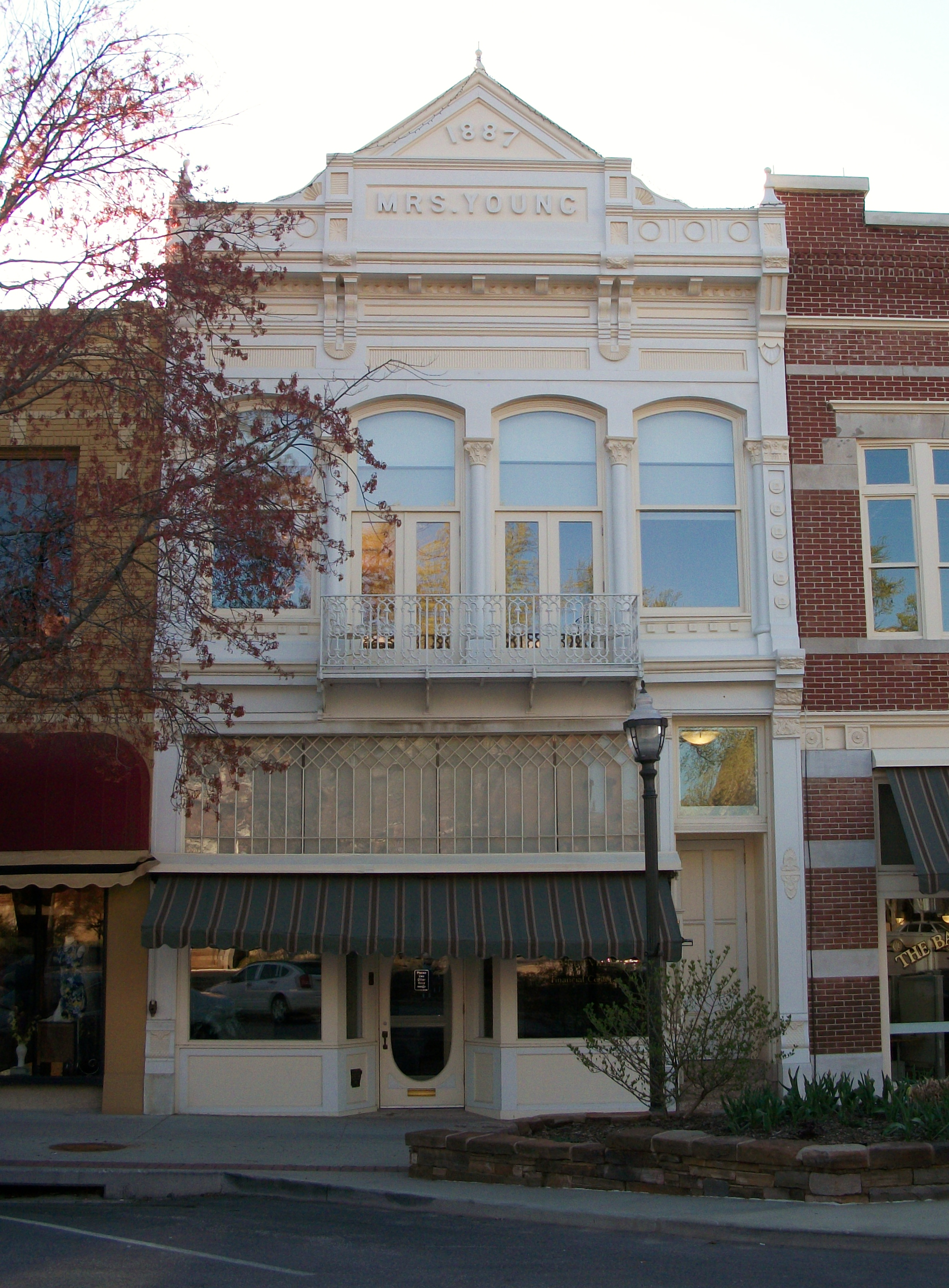
Mrs. Young Building

The Mrs. Young Building, built in the Italianate style in 1887, is one of the older building on the Square according to National Register of Historic Places information.

=== Eponym ===
Mrs. Young and her husband came from Illinois in the 1870s. She was a photographer, and her husband was a travelling dental surgeon. She purchased a lot for a home in 1881. After receiving a divorce in 1883, Mrs. Young built a two-story studio on the town square in 1887. The second floor was home to her photography studio. The first floor was, at various times, a grocery and a bank. With the money from her business plus the rent, she was able to retire.

== Guisinger Building ==
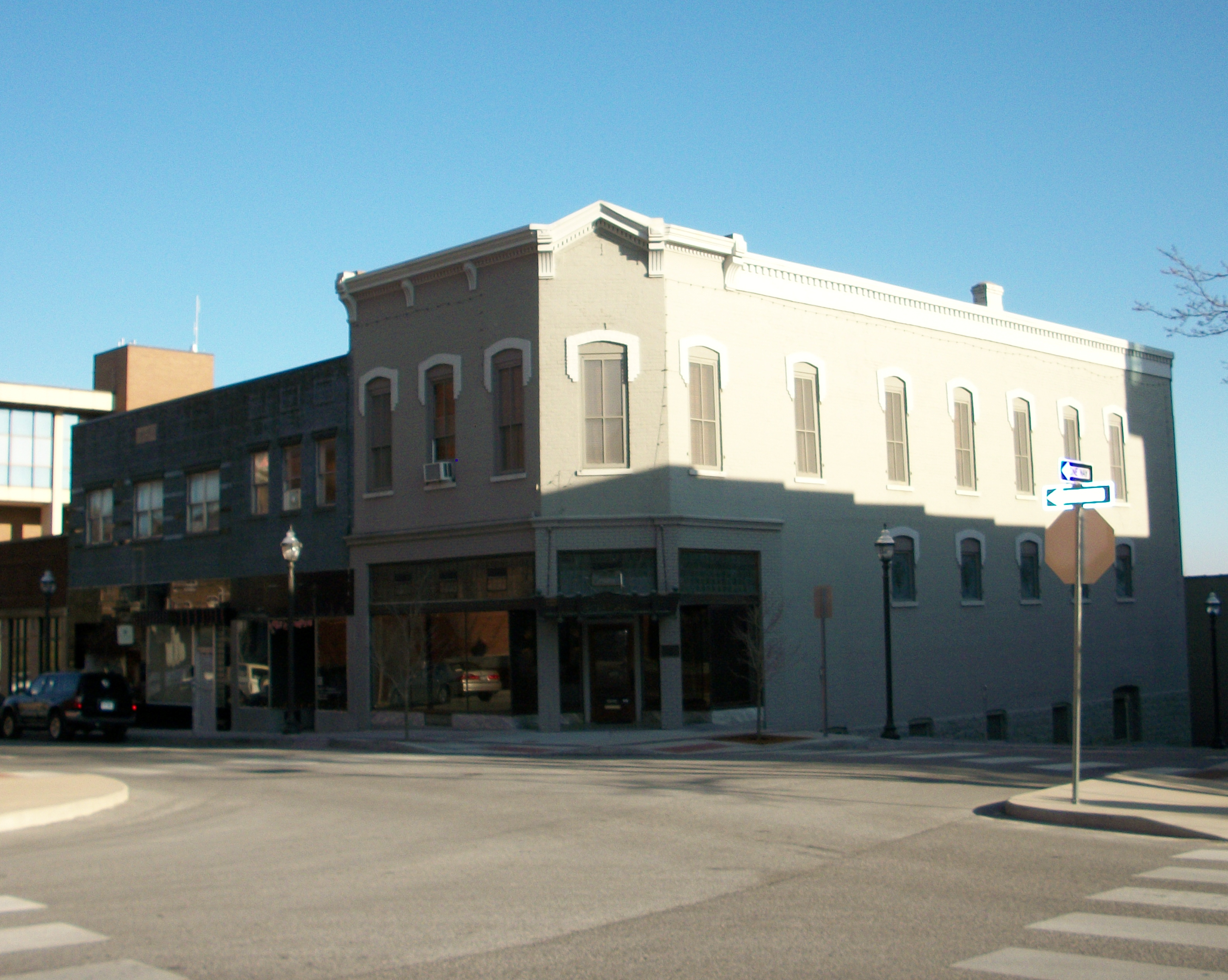
Guisinger Building

The Guisinger Building is located in the southeast corner of the Fayetteville Historic Square. Built in 1886, the building consists of brick walls, a marble base, and pressed tin ceilings. It was constructed by William Crenshaw, a Fayetteville native in the hardware business. Now housing a law firm, the building was recently remodeled.

== Non-NRHP listed buildings on the Fayetteville Historic Square ==
The University of Arkansas Global Campus offices are located on the northeast corner of the square. The East Square Plaza constitutes the east side of the Square. The east half of the south edge of the Square hosts the Fayetteville Town Center. The building was constructed in 2001

Two blocks west of the Square on Mountain Street is the Fayetteville Public Library (Blair Library).

== Parking on the Square ==
Parking is free for any consecutive two hours within a four-hour time period, despite nearby Dickson Street's 2010 change to pay parking. Nearby pay lots are available for Square patrons who plan on staying over two hours.

== Events ==
- The Fayetteville Farmers’ Market - Saturdays April–November, includes around 60 vendors selling a wide variety of locally-grown flowers, produce, meats, eggs, baked goods, plants and arts and crafts.
- Lights of the Ozarks - November–January Fayetteville Parks and Recreation workers spend over 3,300 hours decorating the Downtown Square with over 400,000 lights.
- Sundays on the Square - On the first Sunday of the month, the city's historic downtown square transforms into an outdoor arts district featuring visual artists who create items in a variety of mediums.
- Fayetteville Strawberry Festival - each May, the downtown square holds this festival which includes live music, food trucks, a pie-baking competition, a dog parade, a makers market, food expo, fresh strawberries grown at local farms, and more.
- Fayetteville Film Fest - Hosted each October for films and filmmakers entering the marketplace, the festival includes full, 3-day schedule of panels and other events designed to complement nearly 80 film screenings.
- Falltoberfest - in October, this festival has multiple stages with regional and national talent, fall activities and games for all ages, art installations from local artists, an Oktoberfest Beer Garden, a non-alcoholic cocktail showcase, the Dogtoberfest Dog Show, Mr. Oktoberfest Pageant, and activities and promotions inside Dickson Street businesses.

== See also ==
- Dickson Street, Commercial Historic District a few blocks from the Fayetteville Square
- Washington County Courthouse, built in 1905 very close to the Fayetteville Square
- Old Washington County Jail, built in 1896 one block from the Fayetteville Square
- Maxine's Tap Room, located north of the square on Block Avenue
- National Register of Historic Places listings in Washington County, Arkansas
