= Mount Nord Historic District =

Historic district in Arkansas, United States

- U.S. National Register of Historic Places
- U.S. Historic district
- Location within Arkansas Location within the United States

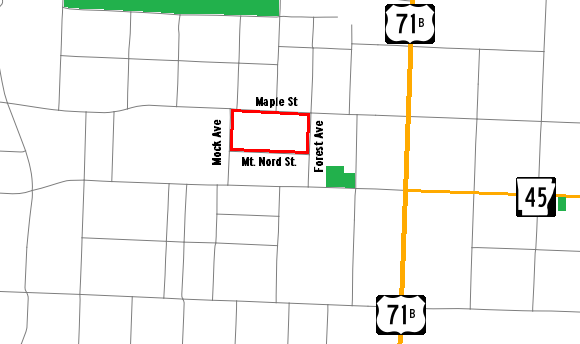
- Location: 1-5 Mount Nord Street, Fayetteville, Arkansas
- Coordinates: 36.0692461°N 94.1610375°W
- Area: 2.9 acres (1.2 ha)
- Built: 1901
- Architectural style: Colonial Revival, Beaux Arts, Georgian Revival, Other
- NRHP reference No.: 82002150
- Added to NRHP: September 16, 1982

Mount Nord Historic District (also Mt. Nord Historic District, formerly Mont Nord Addition) is a historic district in Fayetteville, Arkansas encompassing one city block with five properties. The district lies atop a rise of about 140 feet (43 m) above the surrounding area. The properties were built between 1901 and 1925 in various architectural styles, and the area was listed on the National Register of Historic Places in 1982.

== History ==
Fayetteville began booming after the Civil War with the establishment of the Arkansas Industrial University in 1871 and completion of the St. Louis - San Francisco Railway (Frisco) to the city. The railway also helped the growing apple and strawberry industries surrounding Fayetteville and began the growth of a timber industry. As a result, Fayetteville began to expand outward, including the Mont Nord Addition. The addition was platted in 1908 as the area bounded by Lafayette Street, Maple Street, Forest Avenue, and Mock Avenue. The name "Mont Nord" was taken from French to mean "North Mountain", as the addition was at the northern boundary of Fayetteville at the time. The district formerly included the Arkansas Building, a structure built in St. Louis Missouri for the 1904 World's Fair. Fayetteville businessman Artemus Wolf purchased the structure, had it disassembled, marked, shipped and rebuilt on his property in the Mont Nord Addition in 1905. This structure was demolished in 1939, leaving only the five properties along Mount Nord Street which compose the present-day district.

== Properties ==
- 1890 Mock-Fulbright House

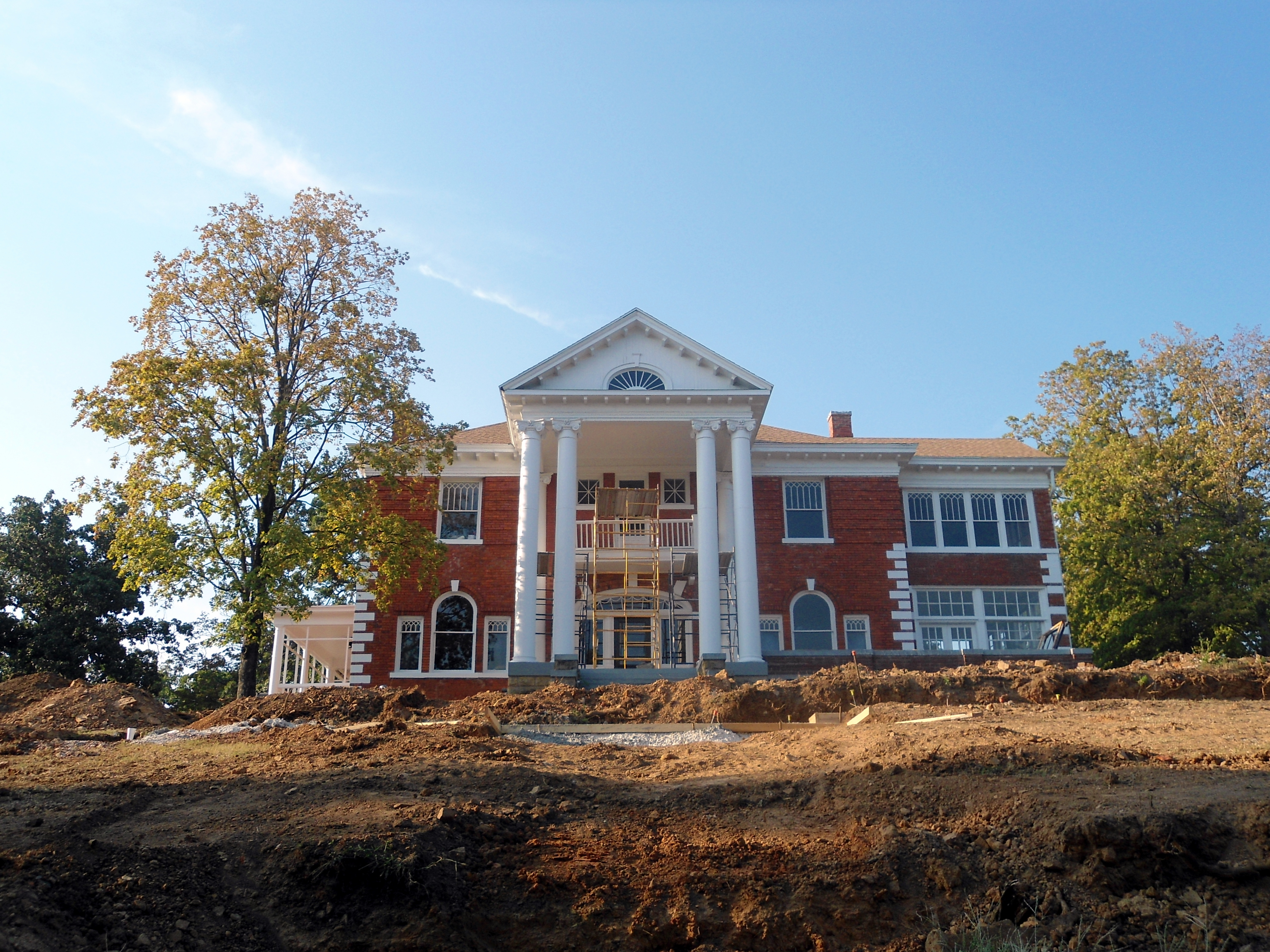

- 1900 Pritchard House

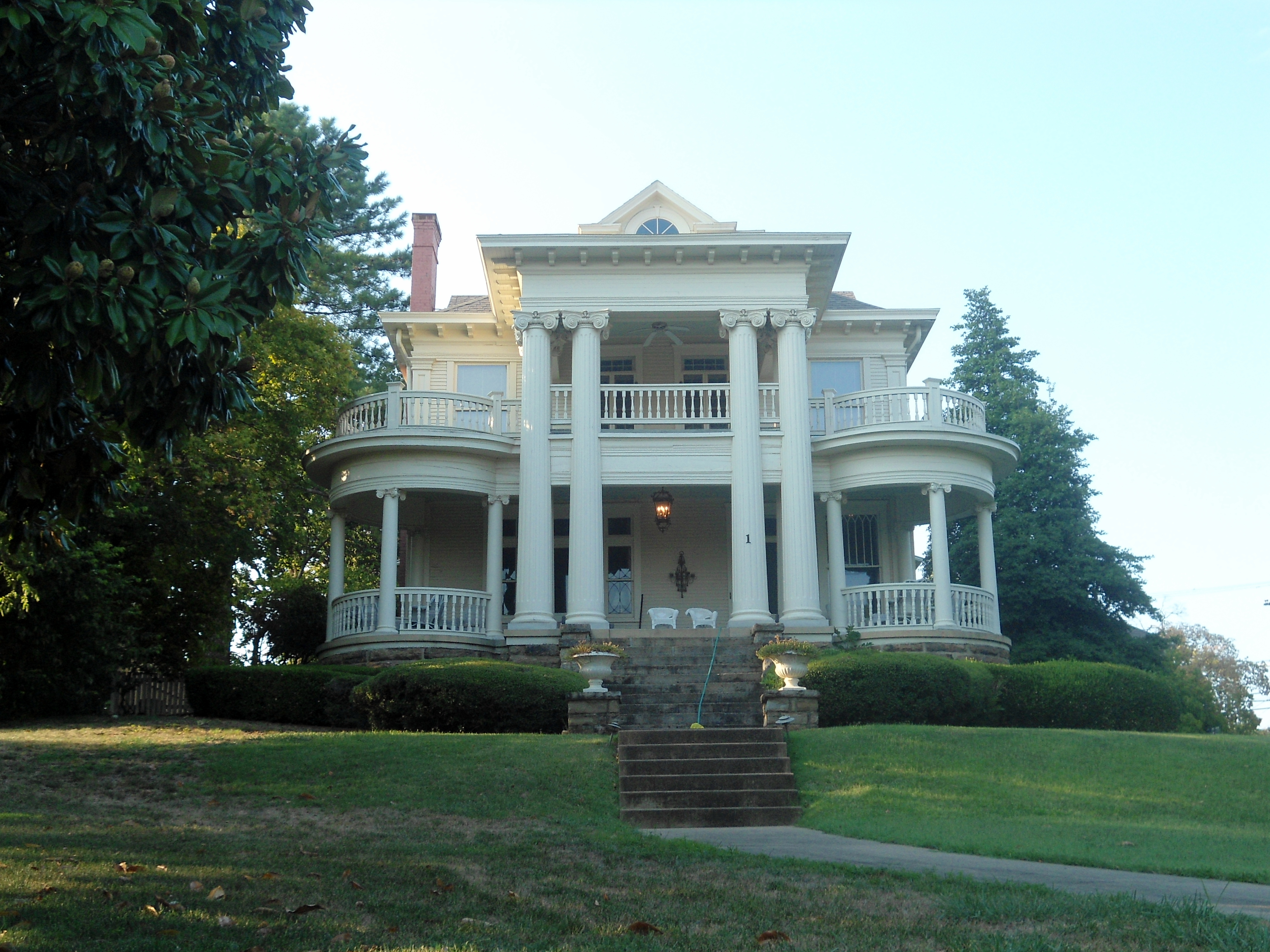

- 1900 Bogart-Huntington House

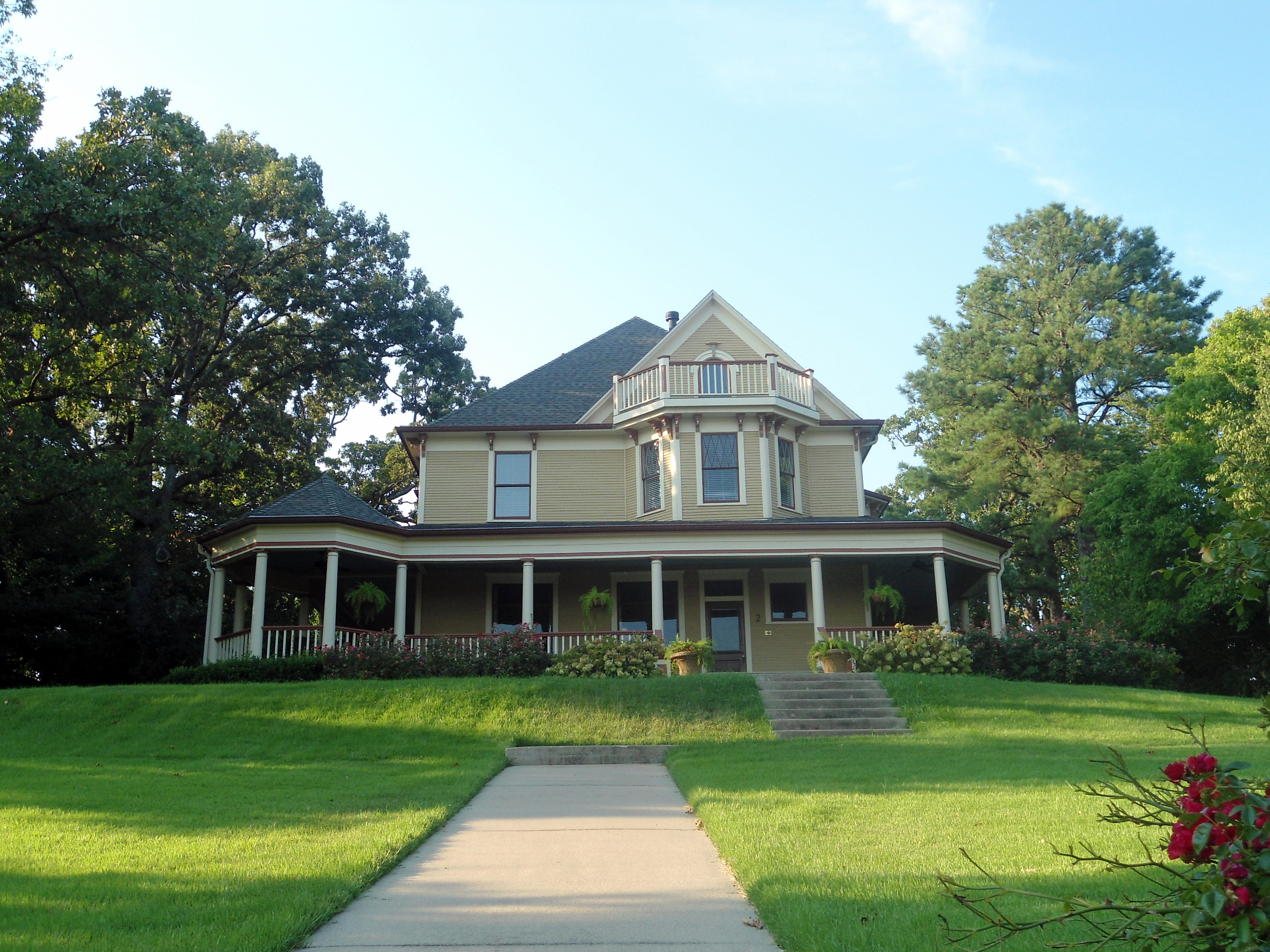

- 1905 Gulley House

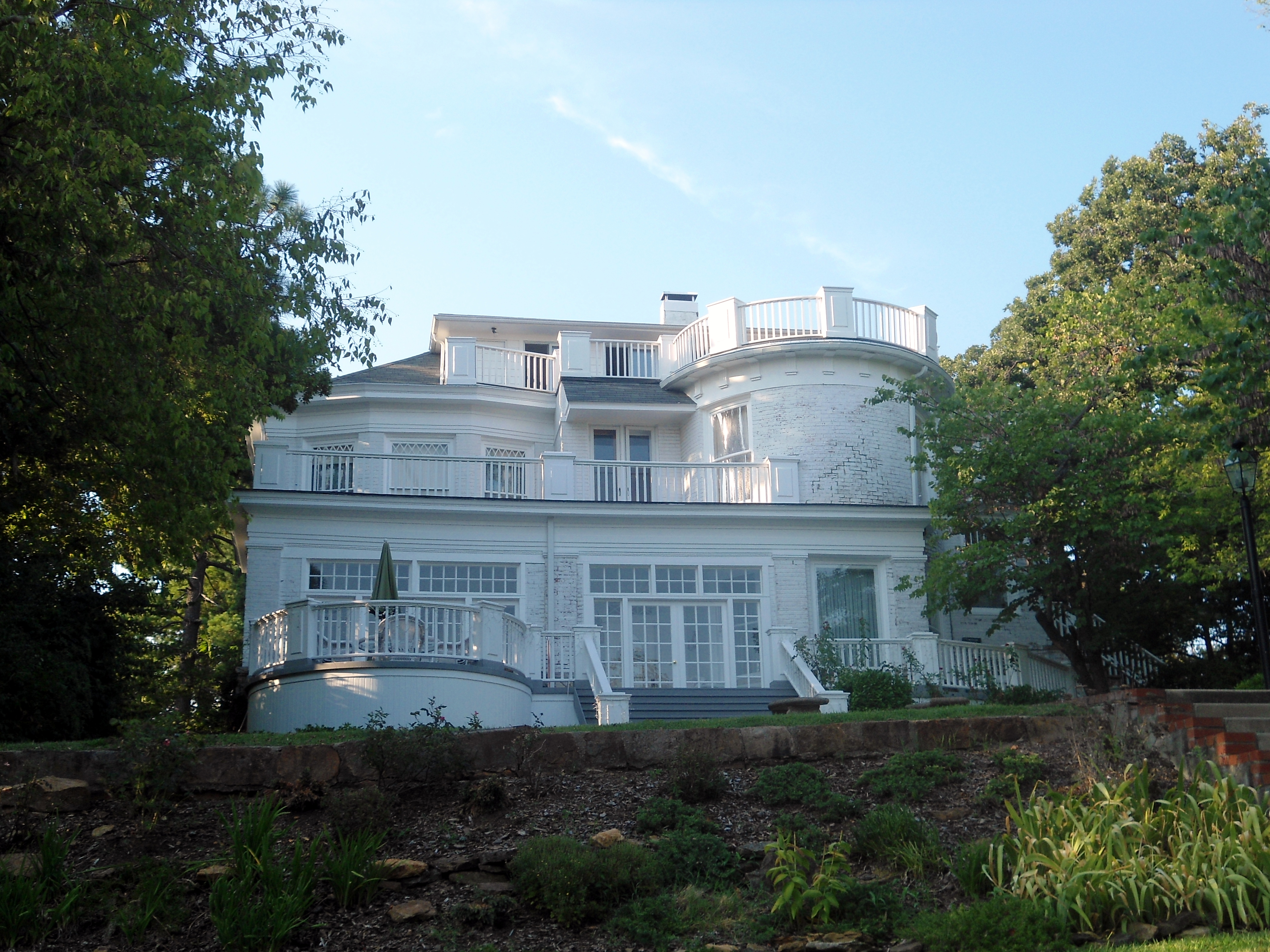

- 1920 Lawson House

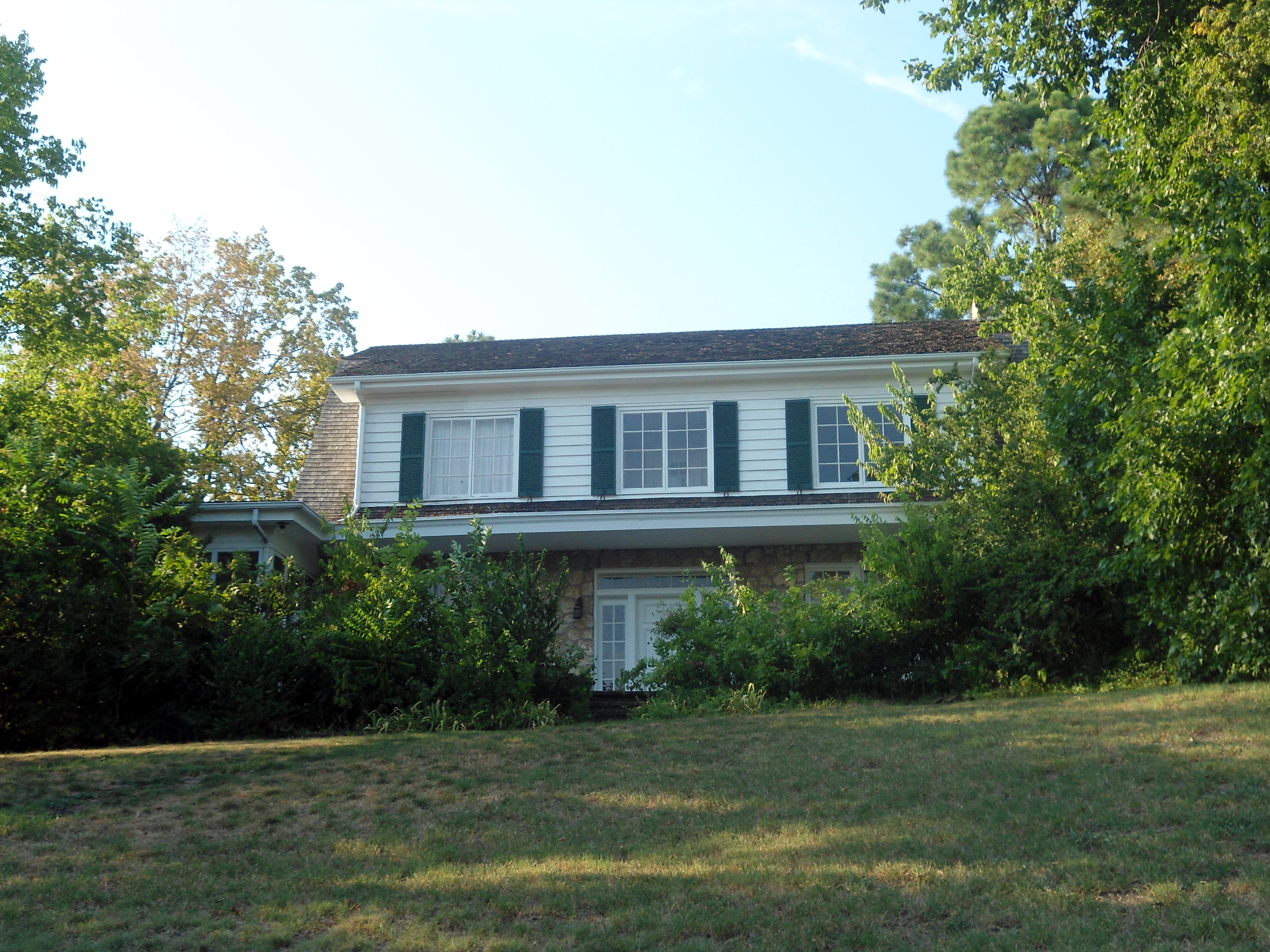

== See also ==
- University of Arkansas Campus Historic District
- Washington-Willow Historic District
- West Dickson Street Commercial Historic District
- Wilson Park Historic District
