= Walton Arts Center =

Performing arts center in Fayetteville, Arkansas

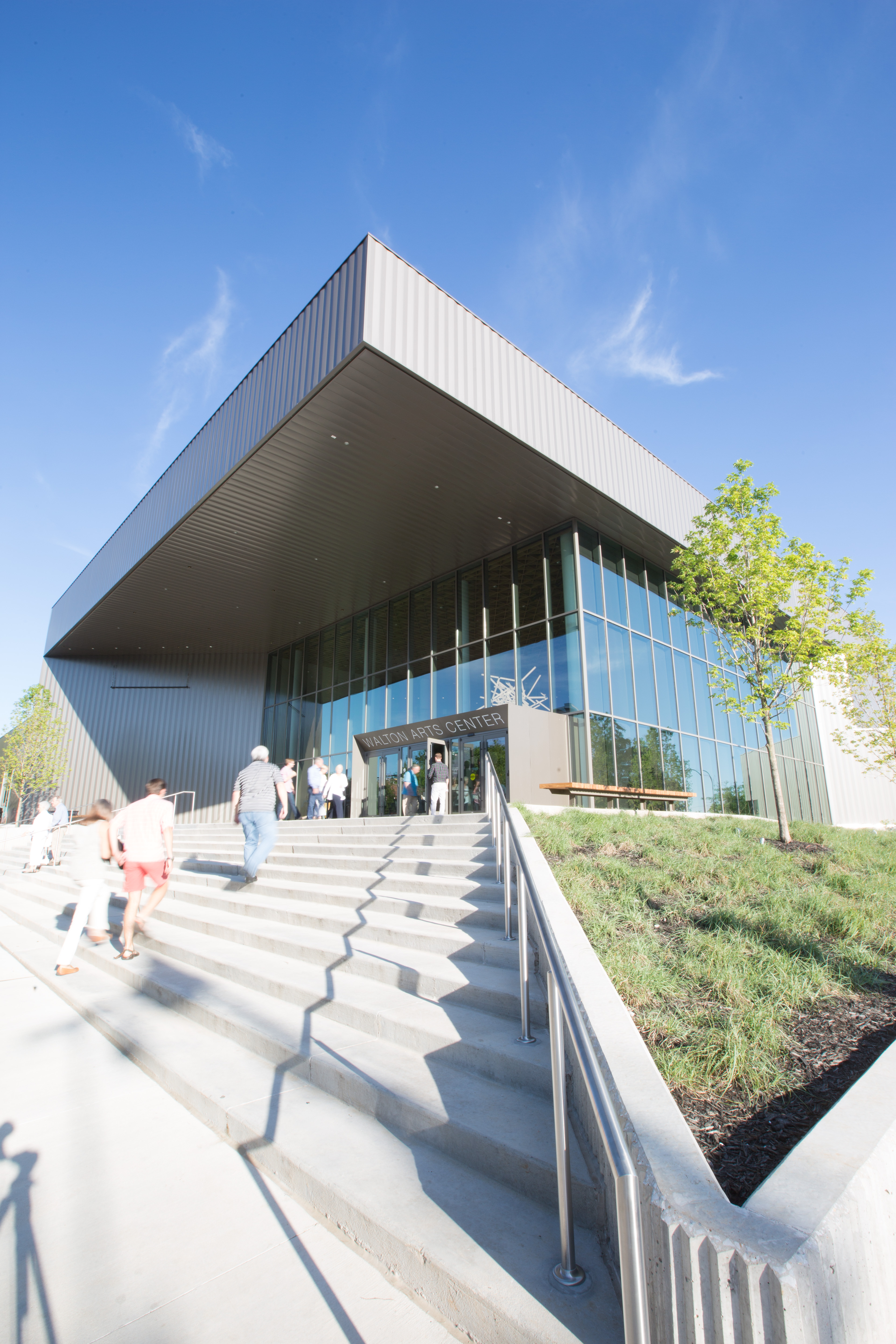
- Main Entrance to the Walton Arts Center
- Interactive map of the Walton Arts Center area

General information
- Type: Performing Arts Center
- Location: 495 W Dickson Street, Fayetteville Arkansas
- Coordinates: 36.065921°N 94.164843°W
- Construction started: May 19, 1990
- Completed: April 26, 1992

The Walton Arts Center is a performing arts center located in Fayetteville, Arkansas. It opened in 1992 and is currently Arkansas' largest and busiest arts presenter.

The center is estimated to have cost about $13 million, which was made possible by a collaboration of the Walton Family Foundation, the university, the city, and the private sector.

The facility currently houses three resident companies: Symphony of Northwest Arkansas, Trike Theatre for Youth, and Community Creative Center. In 2016, the facility was renovated and expanded with an additional 30,000 square feet.

== History ==
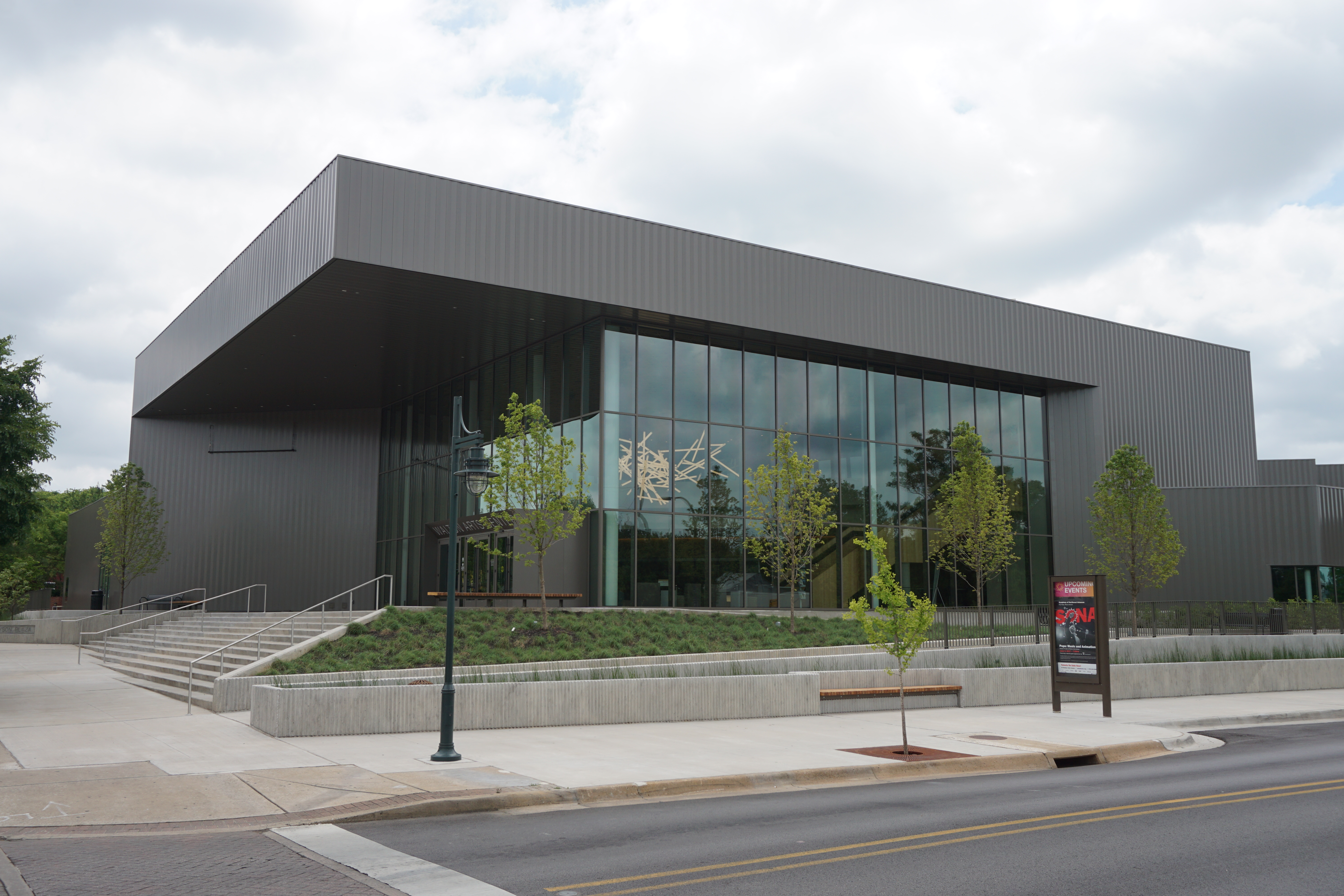
The Walton Arts Center in May 2017

The idea for the Walton Arts Center started in the 1980s with a donation from Sam Walton to the University of Arkansas for the creation of a performance space. After talking with the city of Fayetteville, which was also looking for a multi-purpose space for conferences and special events, the corner of Dickson Street and North School Avenue was chosen for its location approximately halfway between downtown and the University. In 1986 the Walton Arts Center Council was formed with the task of the construction of the facility.

In 2009 Peter B. Lane was appointed the Center's third President/CEO. In 2013 the Arkansas Music Pavilion was relocated to the city of Rogers, AR In 2014 construction of Walmart Arkansas Music Pavilion was completed.

== Art facilities ==
Baum Walker Hall is the main facility of Walton Arts Center. It is a proscenium stage seating 1,200. This venue is used for recitals, lectures, musical performances, ceremonies, and concerts.

Starr Theater is a black box theater that seats up to 250 people. Its 2,750 square feet are used for small shows and events.

Studio Theater is located at the Nadine Baum Studios on West Street across from Walton Arts Center. The capacity is 300 people and the space is 3,996 square feet.

McBride Studio has a capacity of 100 people and the venue is used for business meetings, pre and post-performance receptions, and classes.

Cynthia H. Coughlin Gallery/Main Lobby is used for receptions and dinners when there is not a performance and it serves as the gathering space before a performance. The area can hold up to 400 people at a time.

Bradberry Amphitheater/Rosen Memorial Rose Garden is located on Dickson Street, outside of Walton Arts Center. It is used for weddings, receptions and dinners and has a capacity of 200 people.

Joy Pratt Markham Gallery is a visual arts space located inside of Walton Arts Center.
