= Maxine's Tap Room =

Historic bar in Fayetteville, Arkansas

- Type: Bar
- Founded: 1950 in Fayetteville, Arkansas
- Owner: Andrea Foren
- Maxine's Tap Room
- Interactive map of Maxine's Tap Room
- Address: 107 N. Block Avenue
- Location: Fayetteville, Arkansas
- Coordinates: 36°03′50″N 94°09′38″W

Construction
- Rebuilt: 1963
- Website: maxinesonblock.com

Maxine's Tap Room is a historic bar at 107 N. Block Avenue in Fayetteville, Arkansas. It is one of the oldest bars in Northwest Arkansas.

== History ==
Marjorie Maxine Miller opened the bar in 1950 at age 24 with money she borrowed from her parents, and repaid them within the year. In 1963, she tore down the old wooden building in which the bar had been located and had the current building—a long, narrow brick structure—built in its place. Other features of Miller's business approach included keeping a club behind the bar, having only a pay phone available, and trying to hire football players as employees so the team would follow as patrons. Miller was a constant figure behind the cash register for 50 years until her health began to decline around 2000. She died at age 82 in May 2006.

A month later, the Tap Room caught fire. Due to a lack of insurance, the bar was closed for over a year, reopening in August 2007.

In March 2013, the bar was redeveloped into a cocktail lounge under a partnership with Rebekah Champagne (Terra Tots), Matt Champagne (Hammer And Chisel), and Ben Gitchel and Hannah Withers (Little Bread Co.), all Block Street businesses. Ownership of Maxine's remains in the family, with Maxine's great niece, Andrea Foren.

== Architecture ==
The brick building had only one window in the front, exactly 8.5 inches (220 mm) by 40 inches (1,000 mm), the minimum size allowed by the building codes at the time. This was likely a business decision aimed at limiting break-ins. Most of the furniture inside the bar was later replaced, including the bar itself. The exposed rafters darkened by the fire were painted black, and a skylight was installed where the roof had burned through. Efforts were made to retain fixtures that had been in the bar for many years, such as the older lights and signs.

== Notable features ==
Fixtures of the Tap Room included a 50-foot (15 m)-long bar that ran nearly the entire length of the building, an old coin-operated cigarette machine, a juke box that still played 45s, and a deer head adorned with Mardi Gras beads, sunglasses and a tie.
