= Washington County Jail (Fayetteville, Arkansas) =

- U.S. National Register of Historic Places
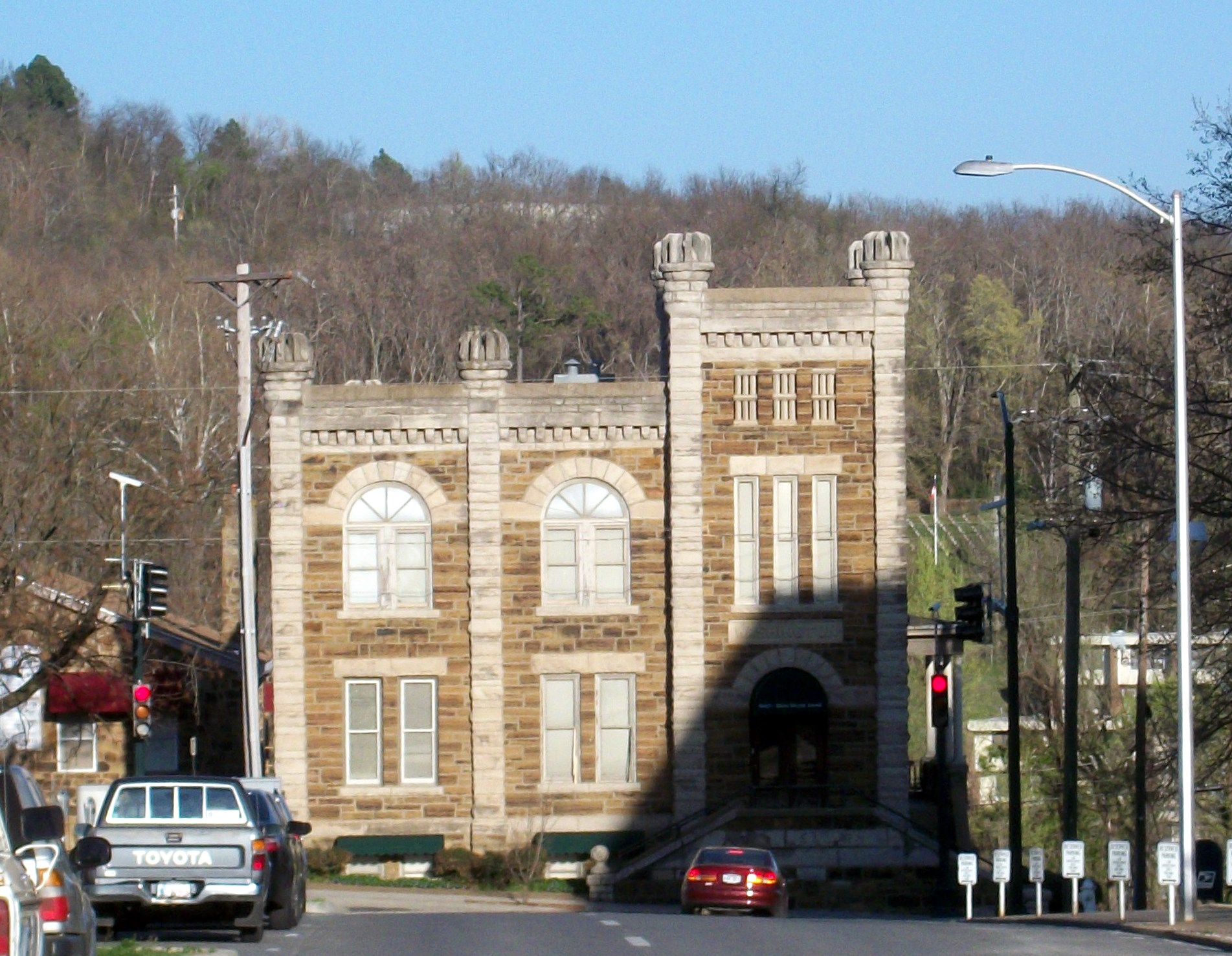
- Washington County Jail, 2011

- Location within Arkansas Location within the United States
- Location: College Avenue (U.S. Route 71B) and County Avenue, Fayetteville, Arkansas
- Coordinates: 36°3′42″N 94°9′27″W
- Area: less than one acre
- Built: 1896
- Architect: W. B. Reese
- Architectural style: Richardsonian Romanesque, Romanesque,
- NRHP reference No.: 78000638
- Added to NRHP: December 1, 1978

The Washington County Jail is a historic former civic building at 90 South College Avenue in Fayetteville, Arkansas. Built in 1896, this building was the fourth to serve as county jail and was in use until 1973, making it the longest tenured in county history. The Romanesque Revival building was designed by W. B. Reese and is locally unusual and distinctive for its medieval appearance. It is built out of load-bearing stone, square-cut and laid in irregular courses, with a rough quarry-cut finish. Most of the building is of darker shades with trim in lighter shades. Nominally two stories in height, the rightmost bay has a square tower with a crenellated parapet.

The building, which is now in private hands, was listed on the National Register of Historic Places in 1978.

== See also ==
- National Register of Historic Places listings in Washington County, Arkansas
