= Dickson Street =

- West Dickson Street Commercial Historic District
- U.S. National Register of Historic Places
- U.S. Historic district
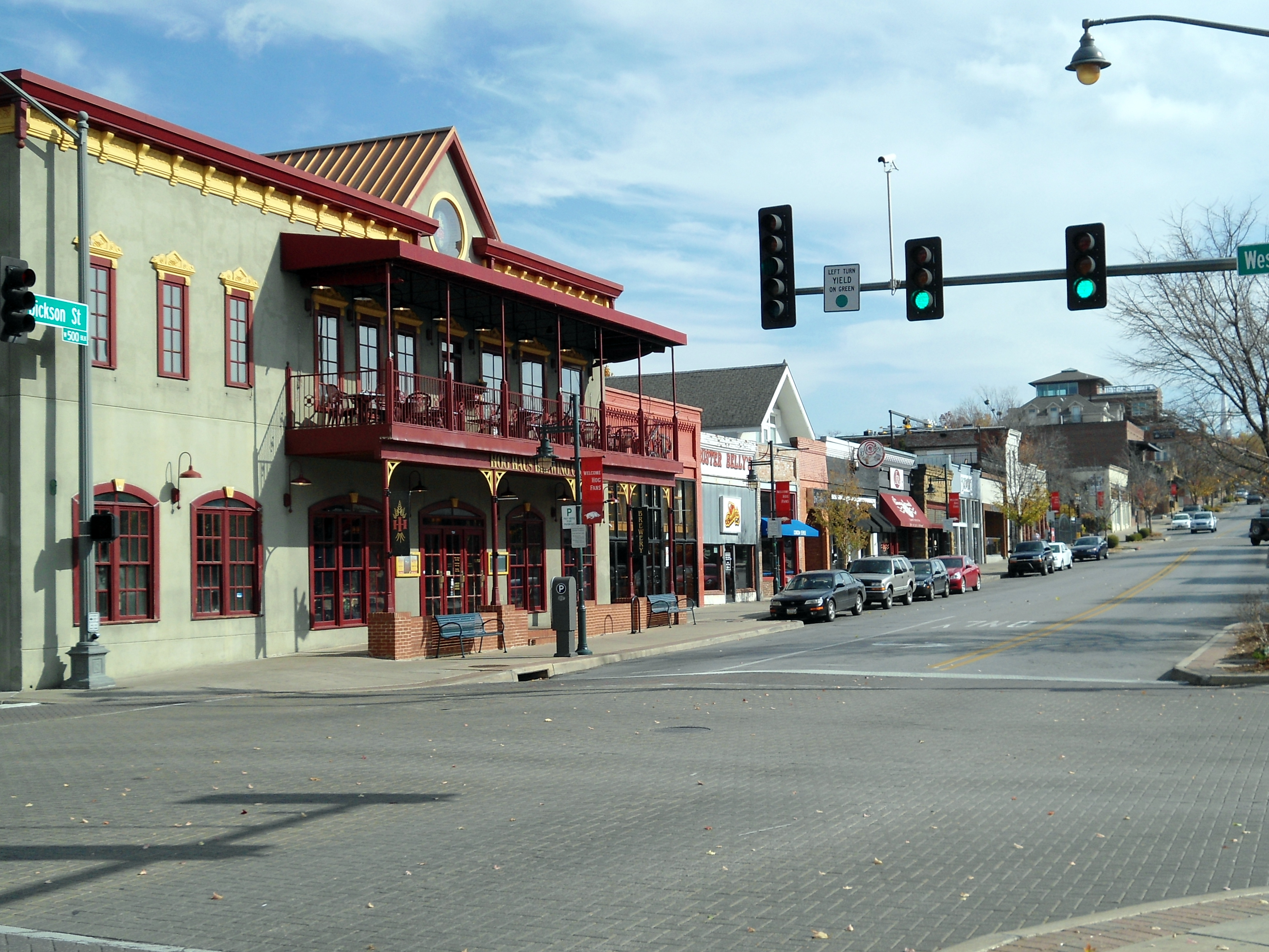
- Dickson Street, November 2012

- Location within Arkansas Location within the United States

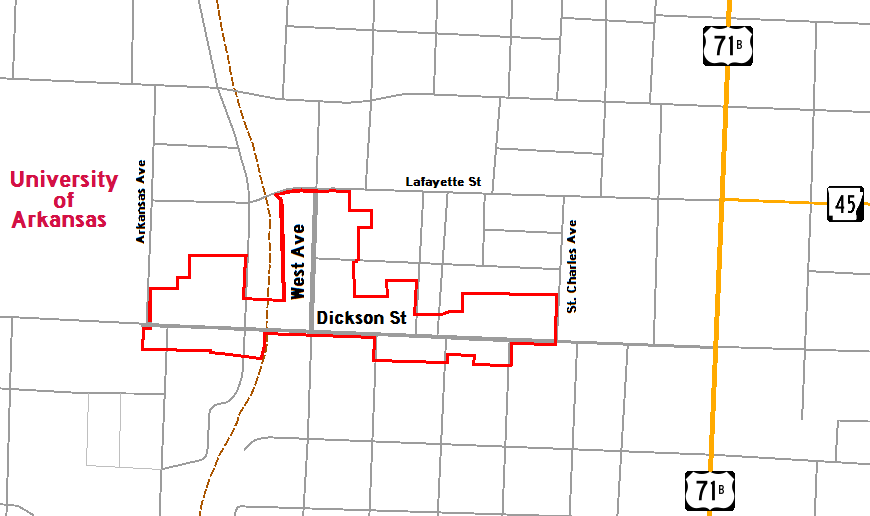
- Location: Dickson St. between Arkansas Ave. & St. Charles Ave. & West Ave. between Dickson St. & Lafayette St., Fayetteville, Arkansas
- Coordinates: 36°3′59″N 94°9′52″W
- Area: 235 acres (95 ha)
- Architect: Bill Sonneman, Paul Young
- Architectural style: Queen Anne, Classical Revival, others
- NRHP reference No.: 07001028
- Added to NRHP: October 01, 2007

The West Dickson Street Commercial Historic District, known as Dickson Street (historically spelled incorrectly as Dixon Street), is an area in downtown Fayetteville, Arkansas, just off the University of Arkansas campus. It is lined with multiple bars, restaurants, and shops unique to the area. Many large condo projects are now under construction as well. Dickson Street is home to the Walton Arts Center and is widely considered one of the two most popular entertainment districts in the state, along with the River Market District in downtown Little Rock.

== Eponym ==
Dickson Street is named for Joseph L. Dickson, who arrived in Fayetteville in the 1840s. The move was in response to his father, Ephraim Dickson, receiving a promotion to United States Land Registrar by President James K. Polk. Dickson first lived on the Fayetteville square before buying a 20-acre (8.1 ha) parcel on the north edge of town, moving himself and his wife to present day Dickson Street. The American Civil War forced the Dicksons to flee to Texas, and their home was used as a field hospital during the Battle of Fayetteville. The Dicksons returned to Fayetteville after the war, but Joseph Dickson died of tuberculosis in 1868.

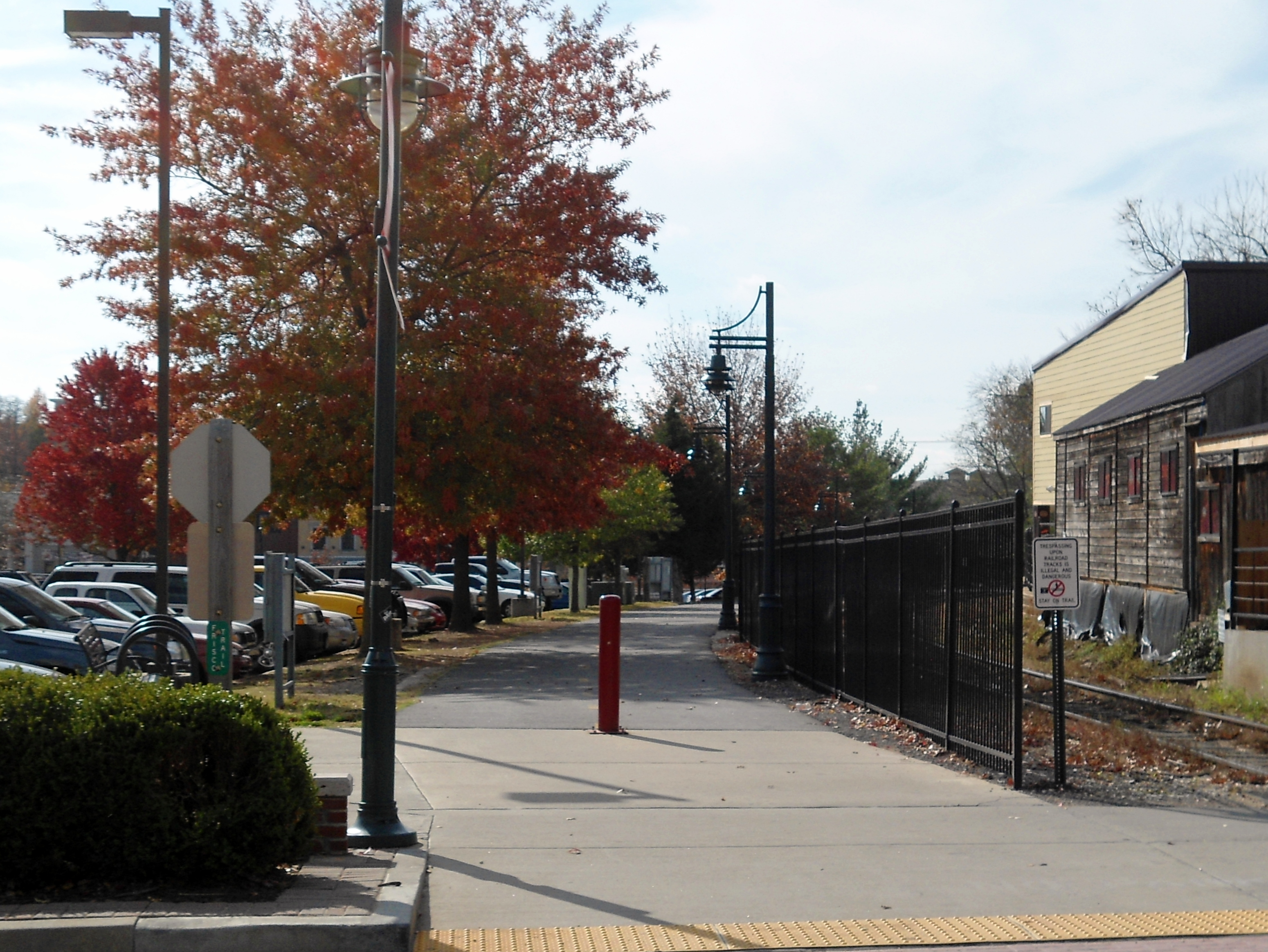
Access point for Frisco Trail - 2012

== Street history ==
Dickson Street was a part of the Arkansas Highway System until the Arkansas State Highway and Transportation Department abandoned the route on April 13, 1955. The designation changed when Highway 16 was rerouted onto Maple Street and Razorback Road.

== See also ==
- National Register of Historic Places listings in Washington County, Arkansas
