= Washington–Willow Historic District =

Historic district in Arkansas, United States

- U.S. National Register of Historic Places
- U.S. Historic district
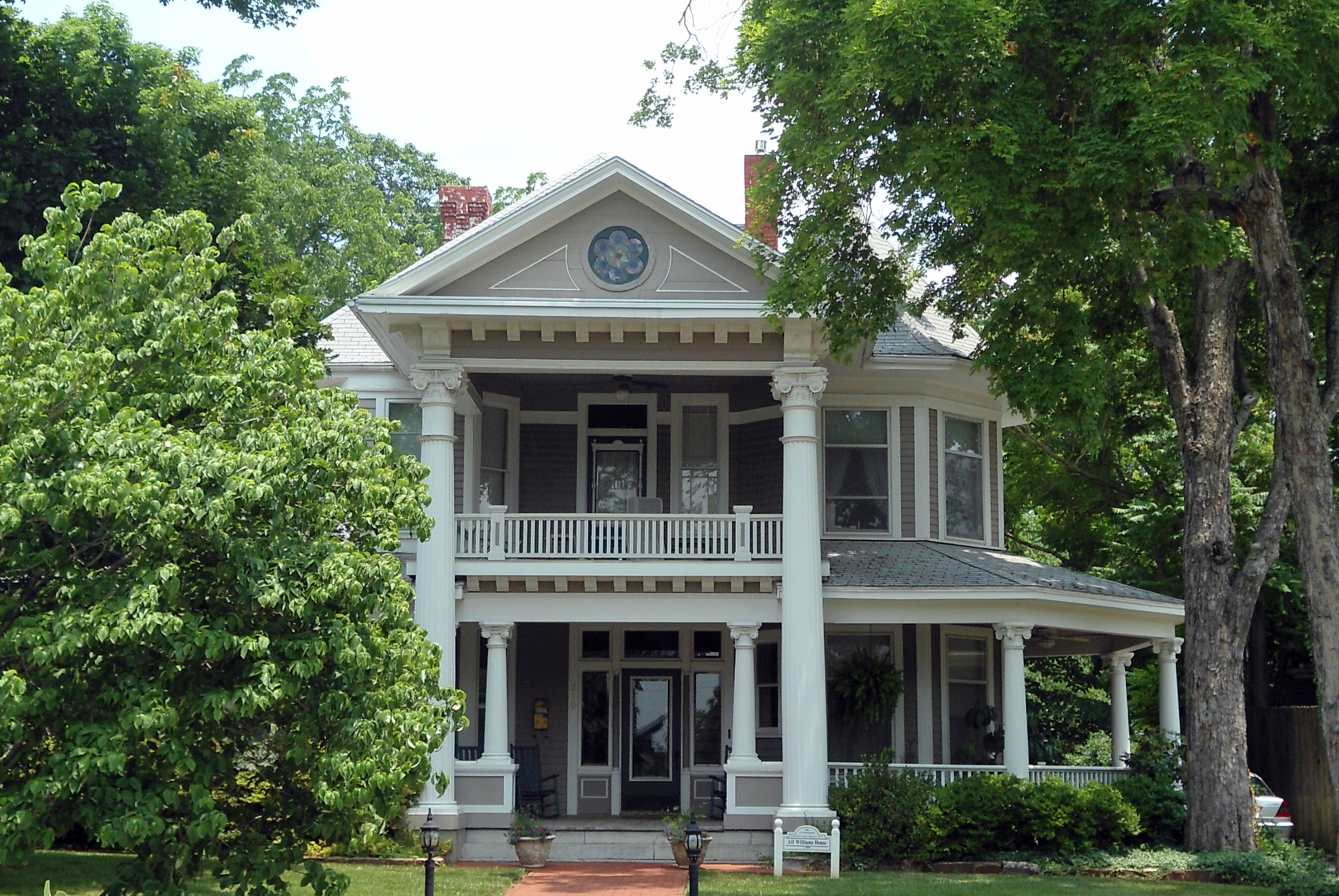
- Alf Williams House, located within the district

- Location within Arkansas Location within the United States
- Location: Roughly bounded by College Ave. and Mission Blvd., Rebecca and Spring Sts., Fayetteville, Arkansas
- Coordinates: 36.06996°N 94.15607°W
- Area: 37 acres (15 ha)
- Architectural style: Late Victorian, Bungalow/craftsman
- NRHP reference No.: 80000789
- Added to NRHP: May 23, 1980

Washington–Willow Historic District is a residential neighborhood of Fayetteville, Arkansas containing over one hundred historically and architecturally significant homes. Styles range from those popular in the mid-19th century through present day, predominantly Victorian, Italianate, neoclassical, and craftsman bungalows. Historically, Fayetteville leaders in business, law and education have all called the district home. The homes sit at the foot of East Mountain within the Masonic Addition, the first addition platted following incorporation.

Encompassing roughly 37 acres (0.15 km^{2}), the district is bounded by College Avenue (U.S. Route 71B) on the west, Mission Boulevard on the east, Rebecca Street to the north, and Spring Street to the south. The primary streets within the district are the namesake Washington Avenue and Willow Avenue, crossing Davidson Street, Maple Street, Lafayette Street, and Dickson Street. The district was listed on the National Register of Historic Places in 1980, and its boundaries were increased in 1995.

== Structures ==
Although 105 structures were listed as "primary structures" on the initial 1980 submission, nineteen structures were listed to have special significance.

=== Headquarters House ===
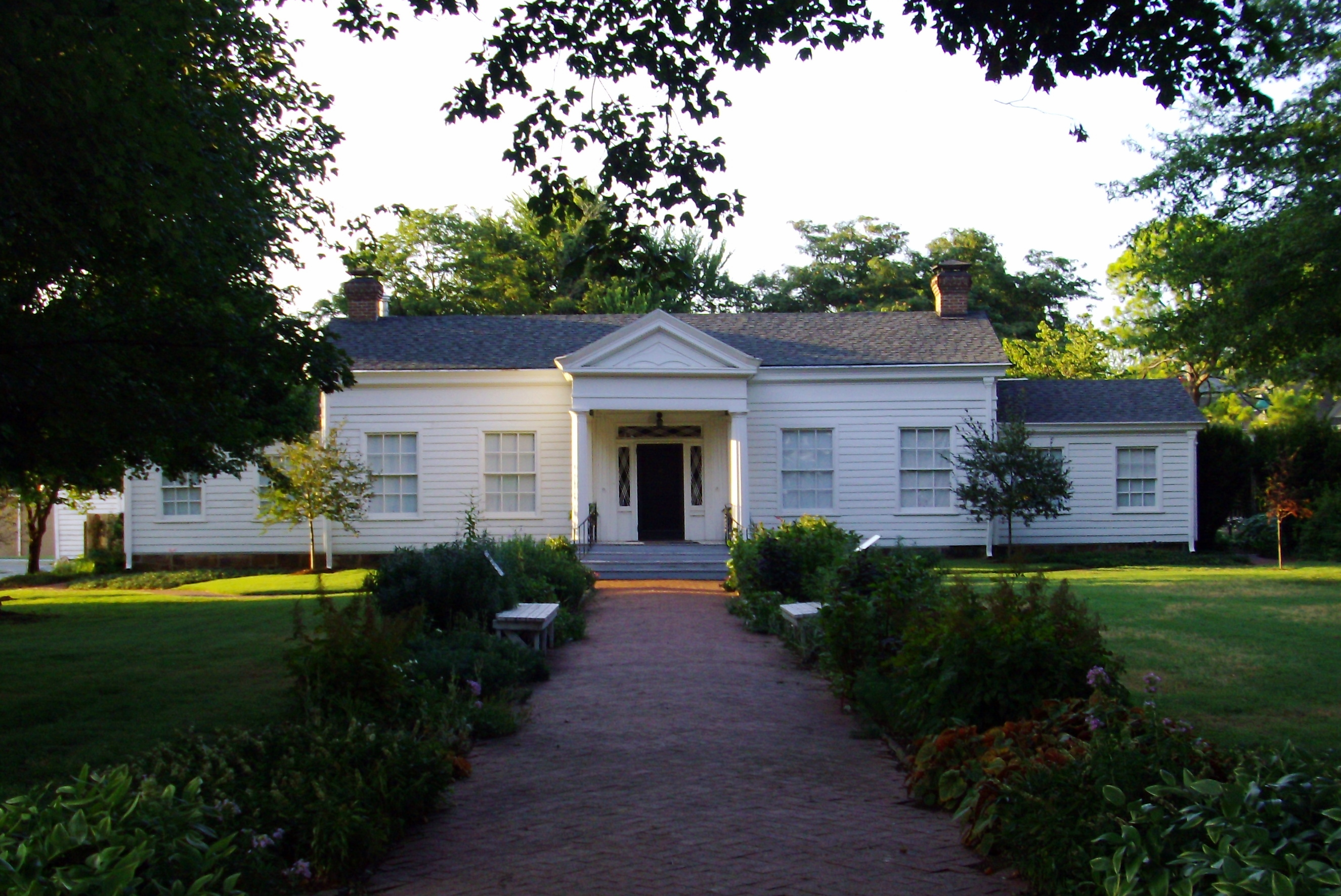

Headquarters House, located at 118 East Dickson Street, is a historic house within the Washington–Willow Historic District in Fayetteville, Arkansas. The most historically significant structure in the city, it was built in 1853 and used as a base of operations for both the Union and Confederate States of America at different periods during the American Civil War. The house was the point of contention during the Battle of Fayetteville, which took place at the nearby intersection of College Avenue and Dickson Street. Headquarters House was listed on the National Register of Historic Places in 1971, prior to the designation of the Washington–Willow Historic District.

During the siege on April 18, 1863, the Union-occupied structure sustained damage from a Confederate cannonball striking the front door. The Union ultimately repelled the attack and was able to maintain control of northwest Arkansas.

A one-story weatherboard structure with fluted columns surrounding a central portico, the Headquarters House has significant elements of the Greek Revival style. The corners of the building possess decorative pilasters with transom and small sidelights adjacent to the doorway. The building was donated to the Washington County Historical Society as a museum in 1967, a function it has maintained ever since.

=== Significant structures ===
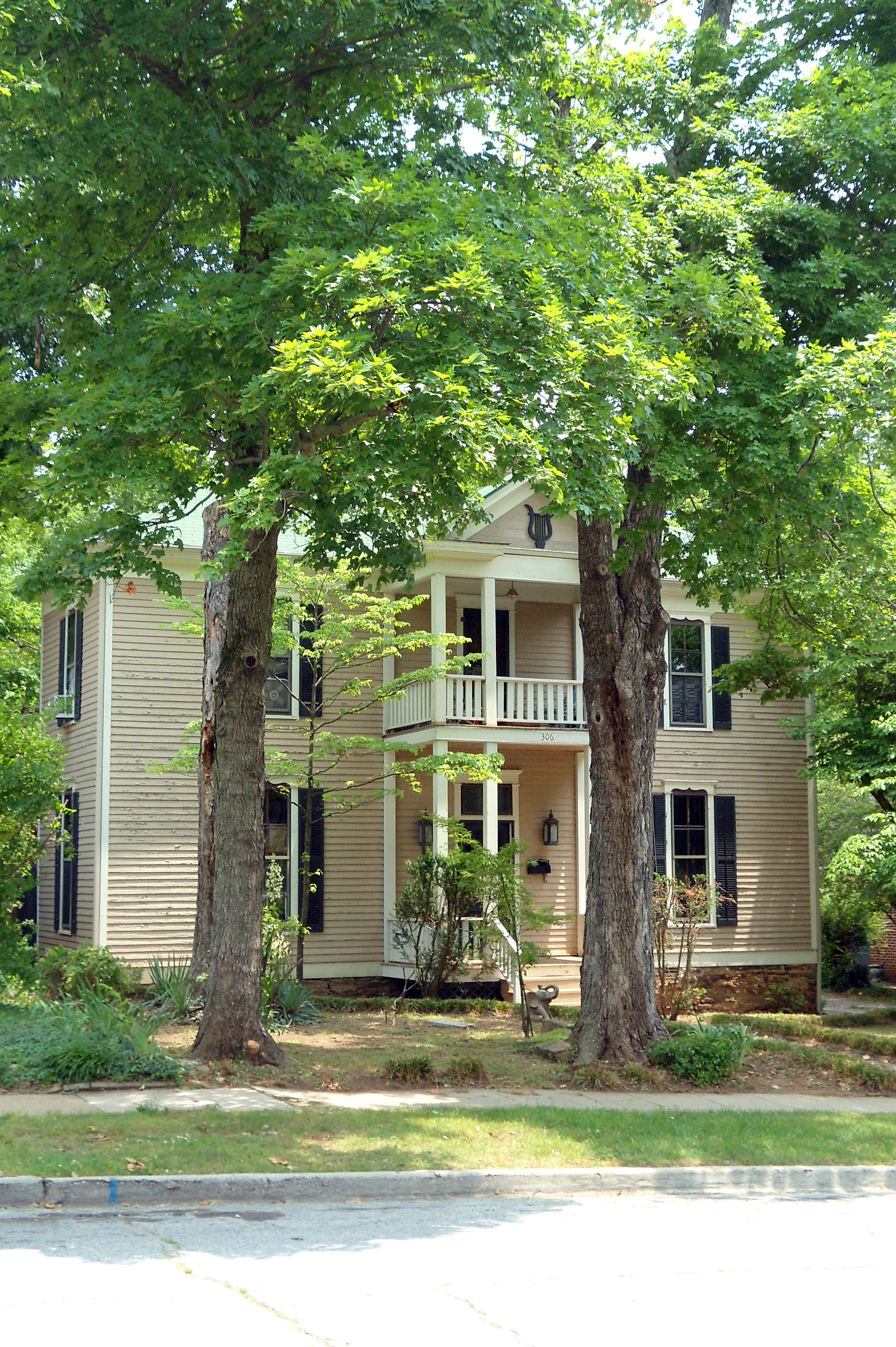
306 Washington

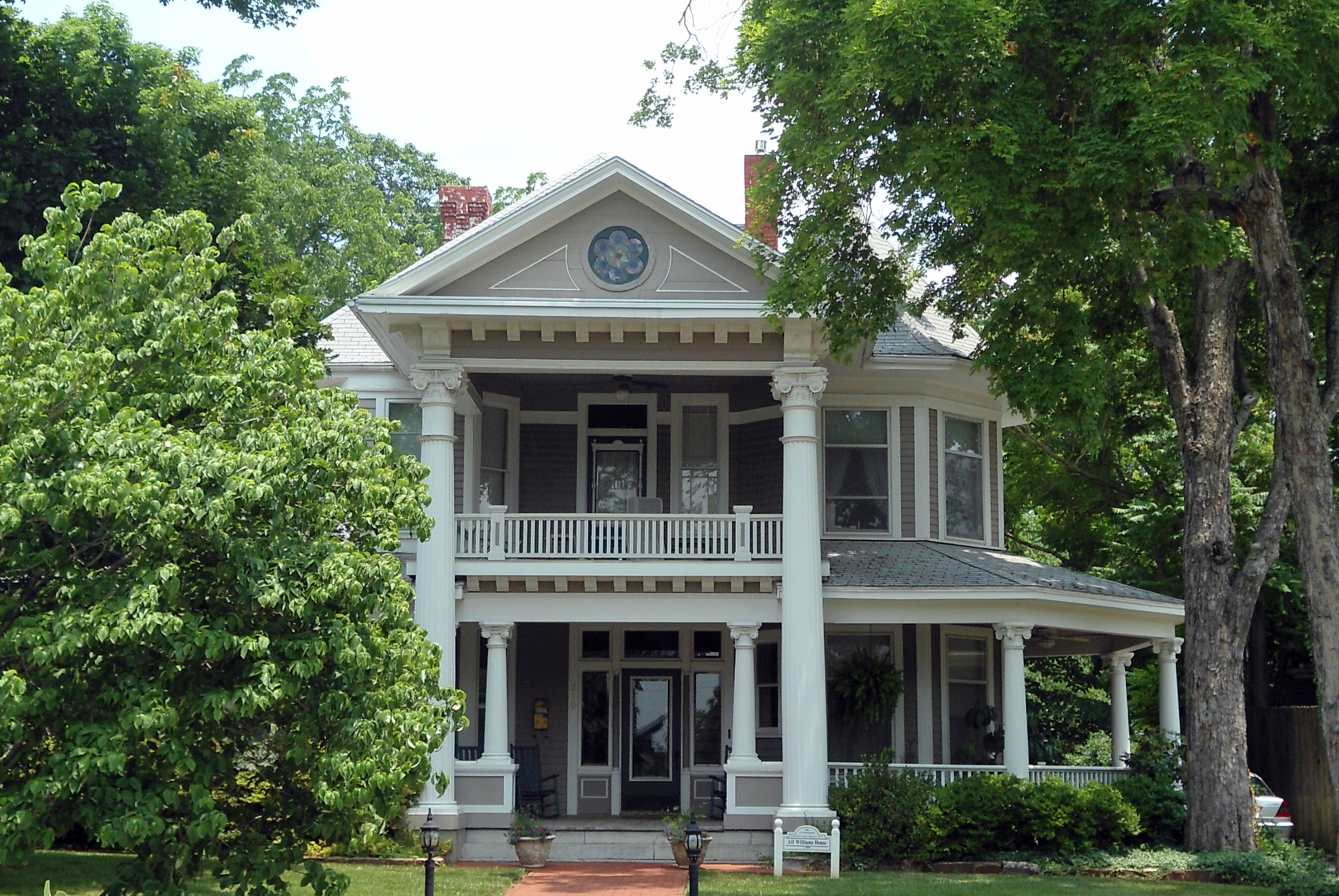
310 Washington

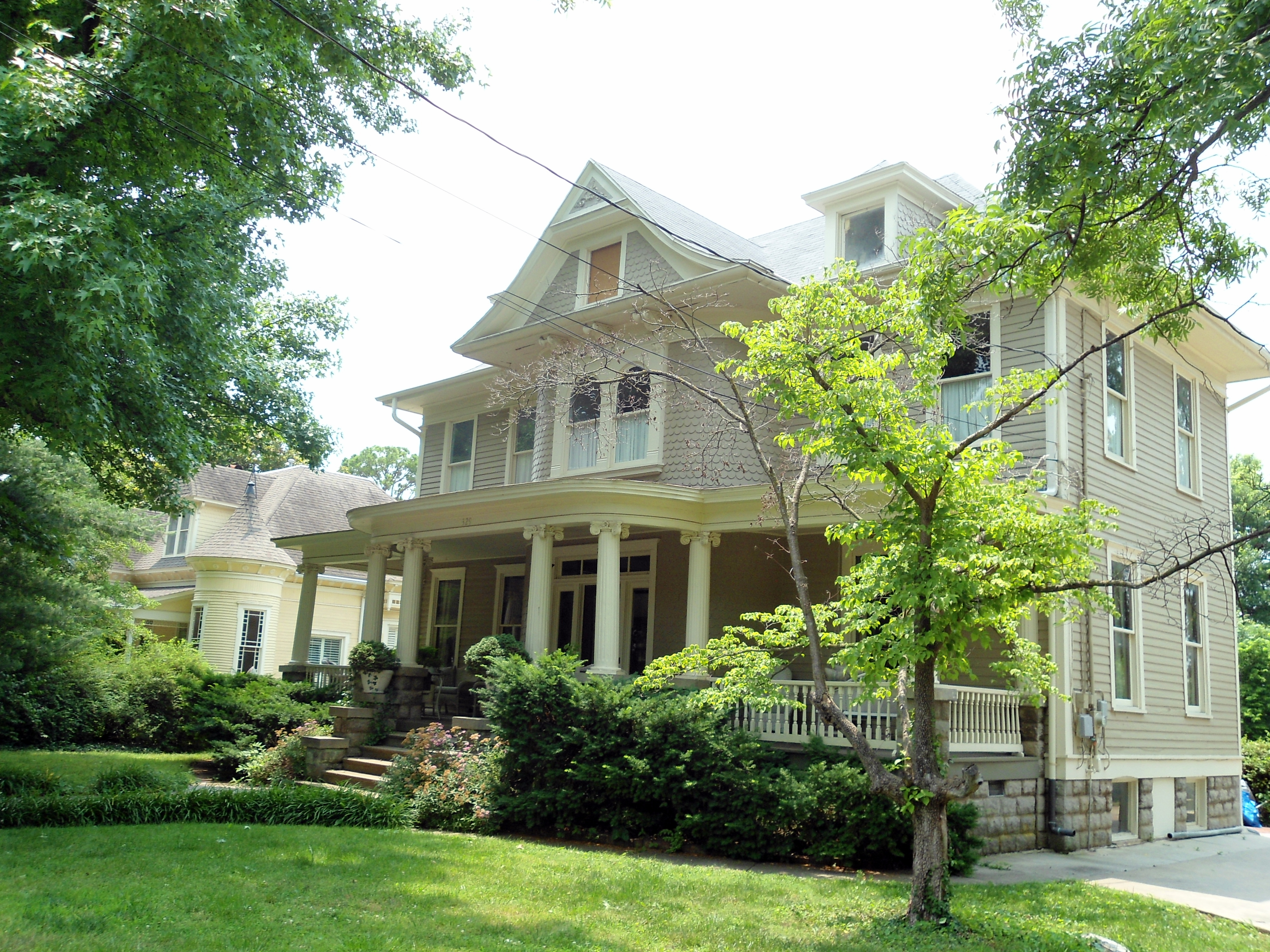
329 Washington

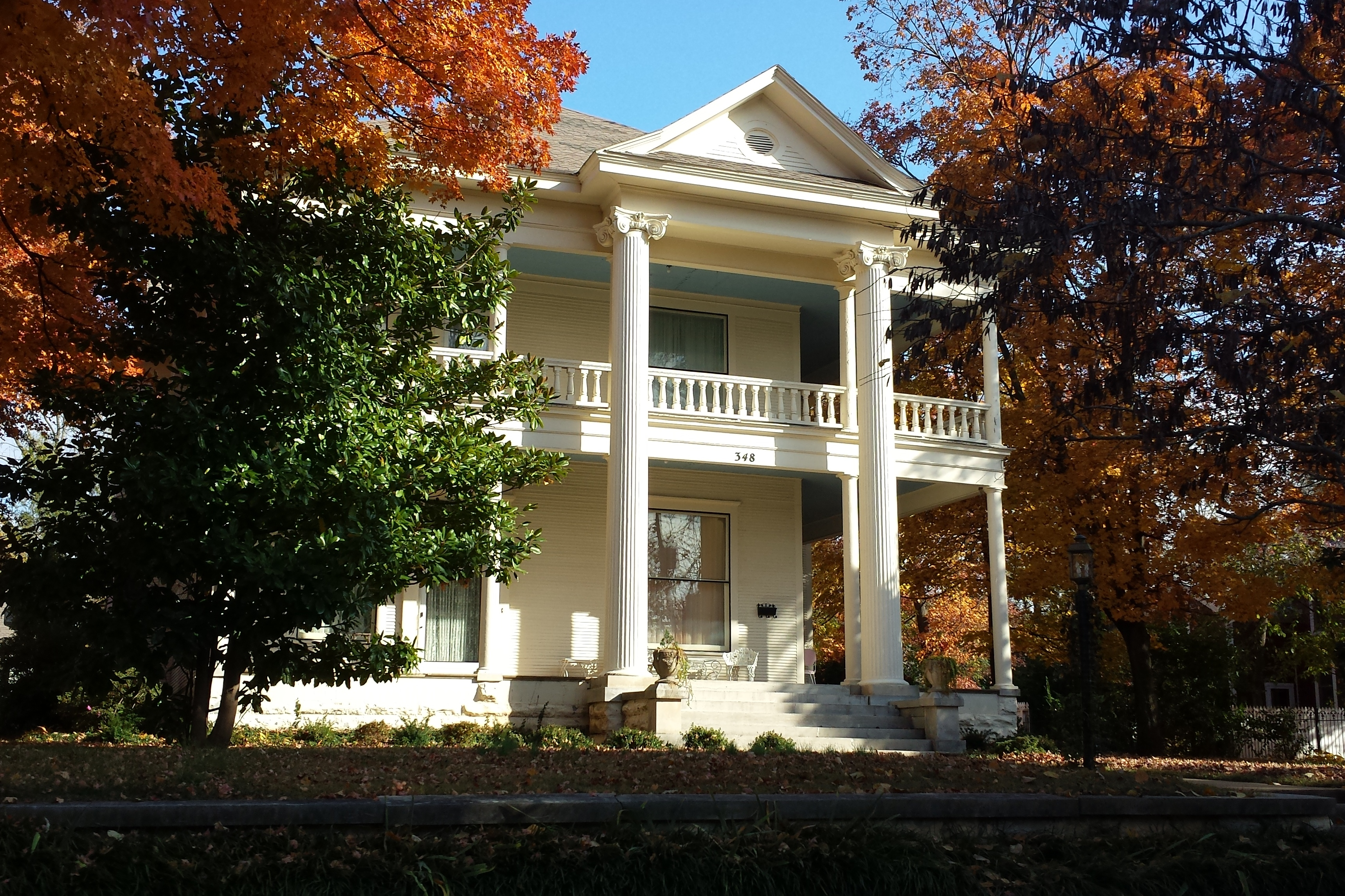
348 Washington

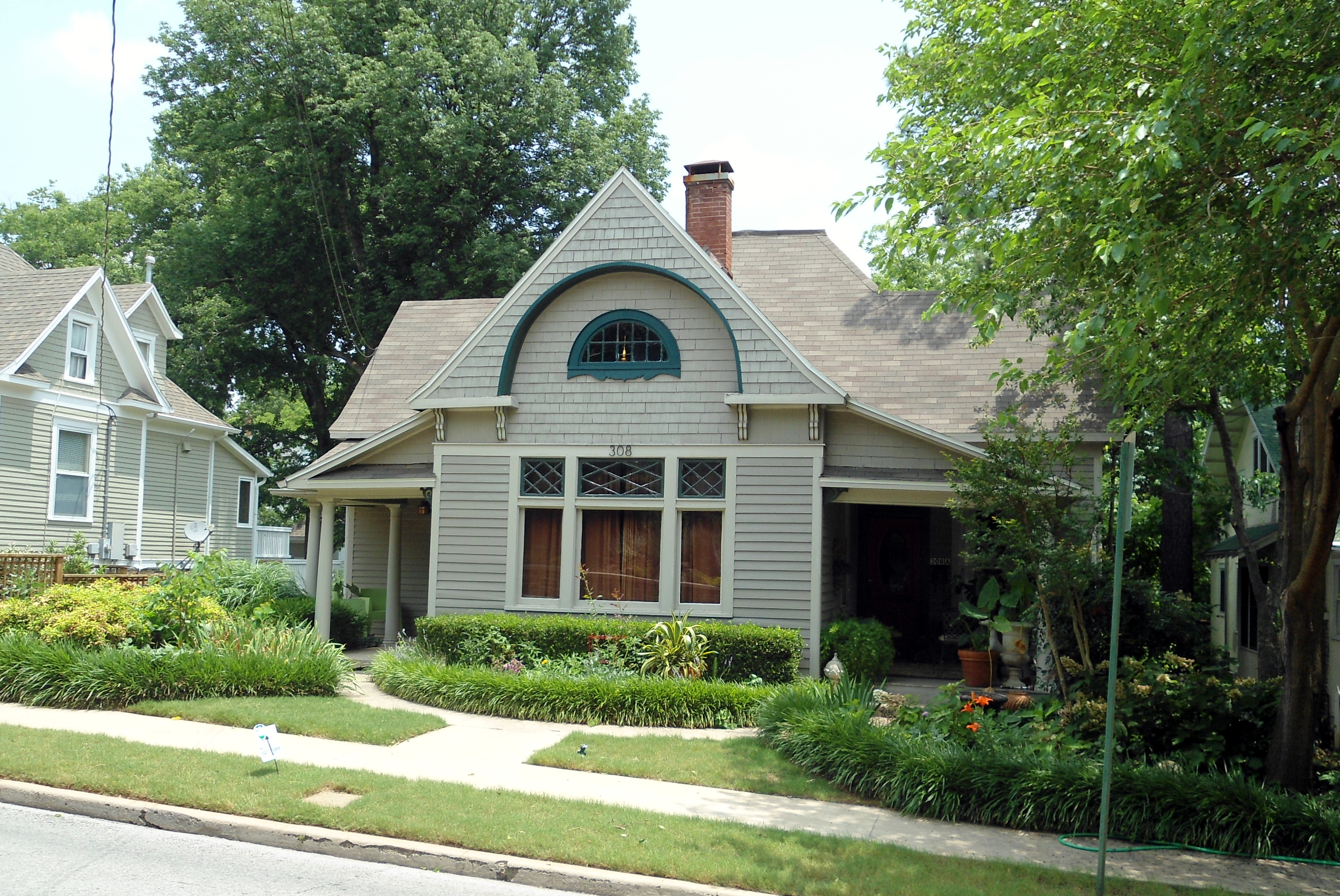
308 Willow

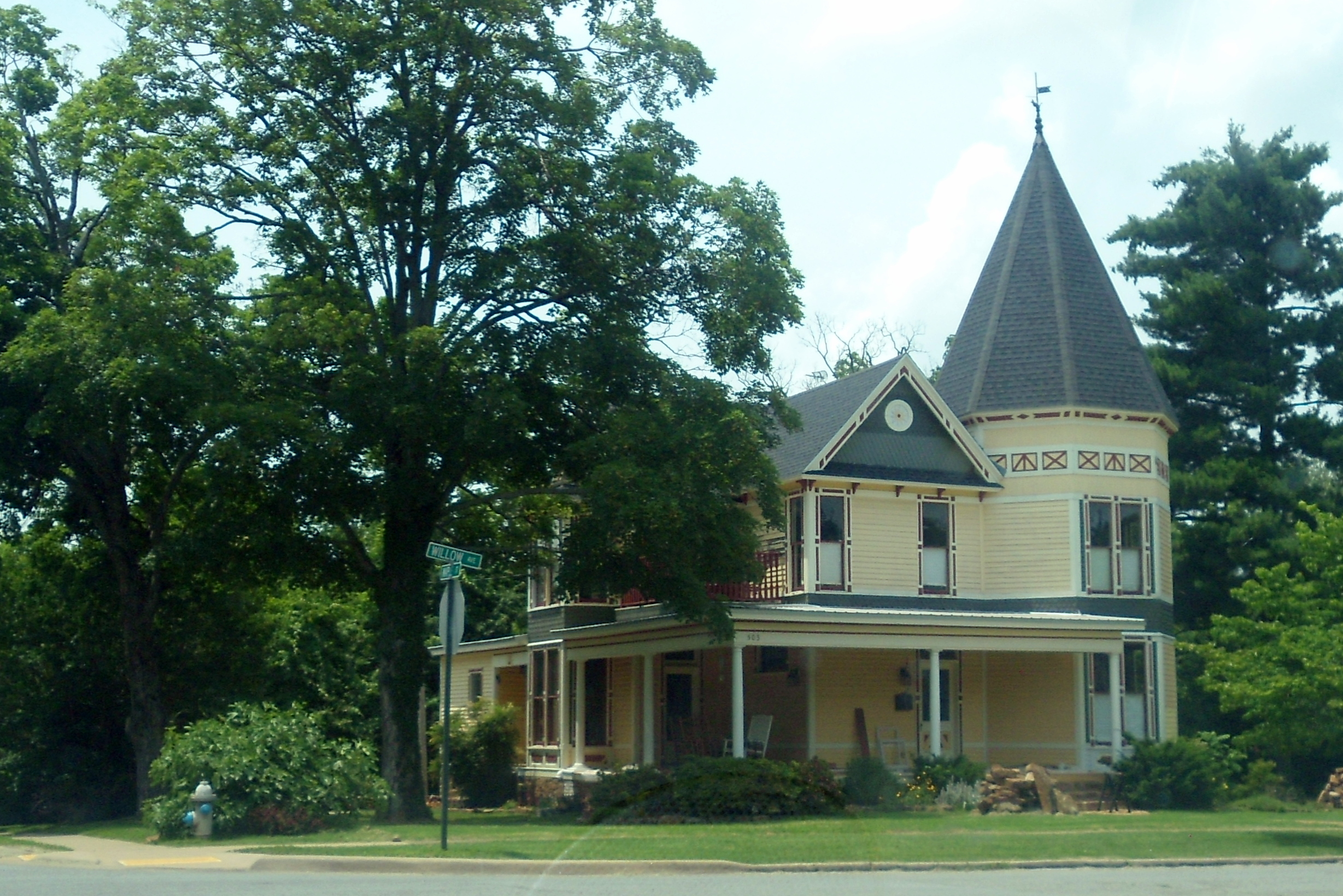
503 Willow

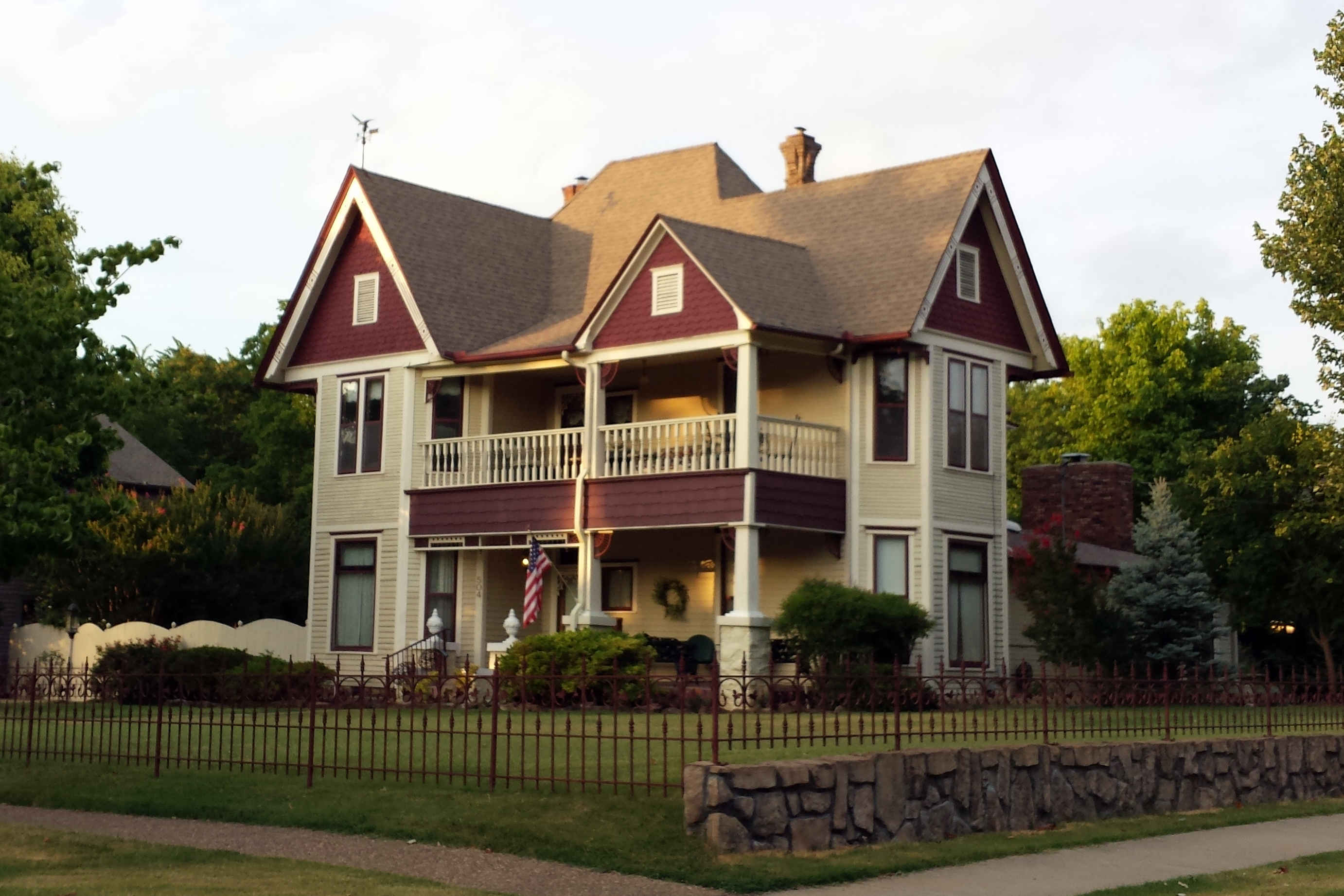
504 Willow

=== Homes adding to the character of the district ===
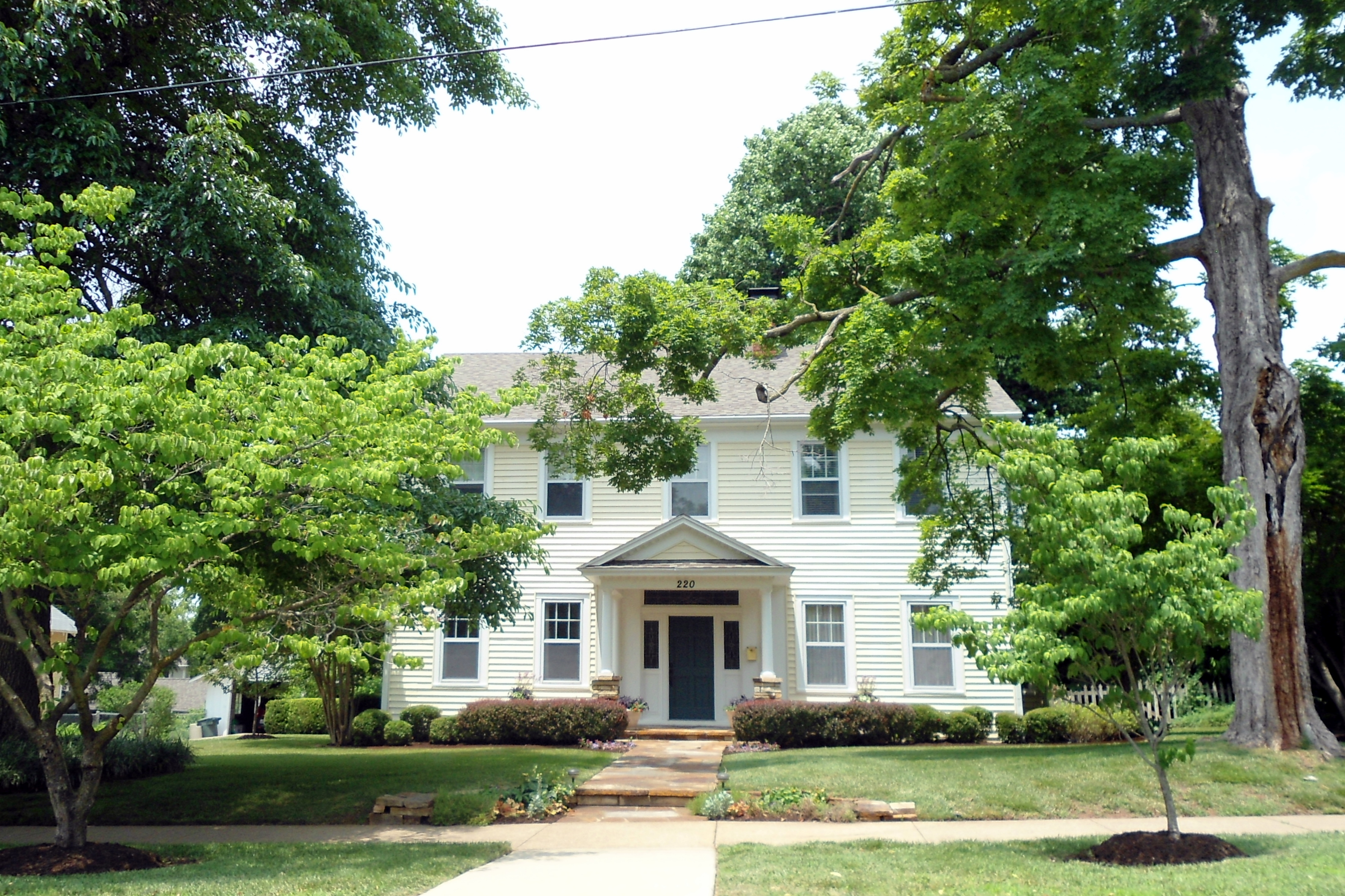
220 Lafayette

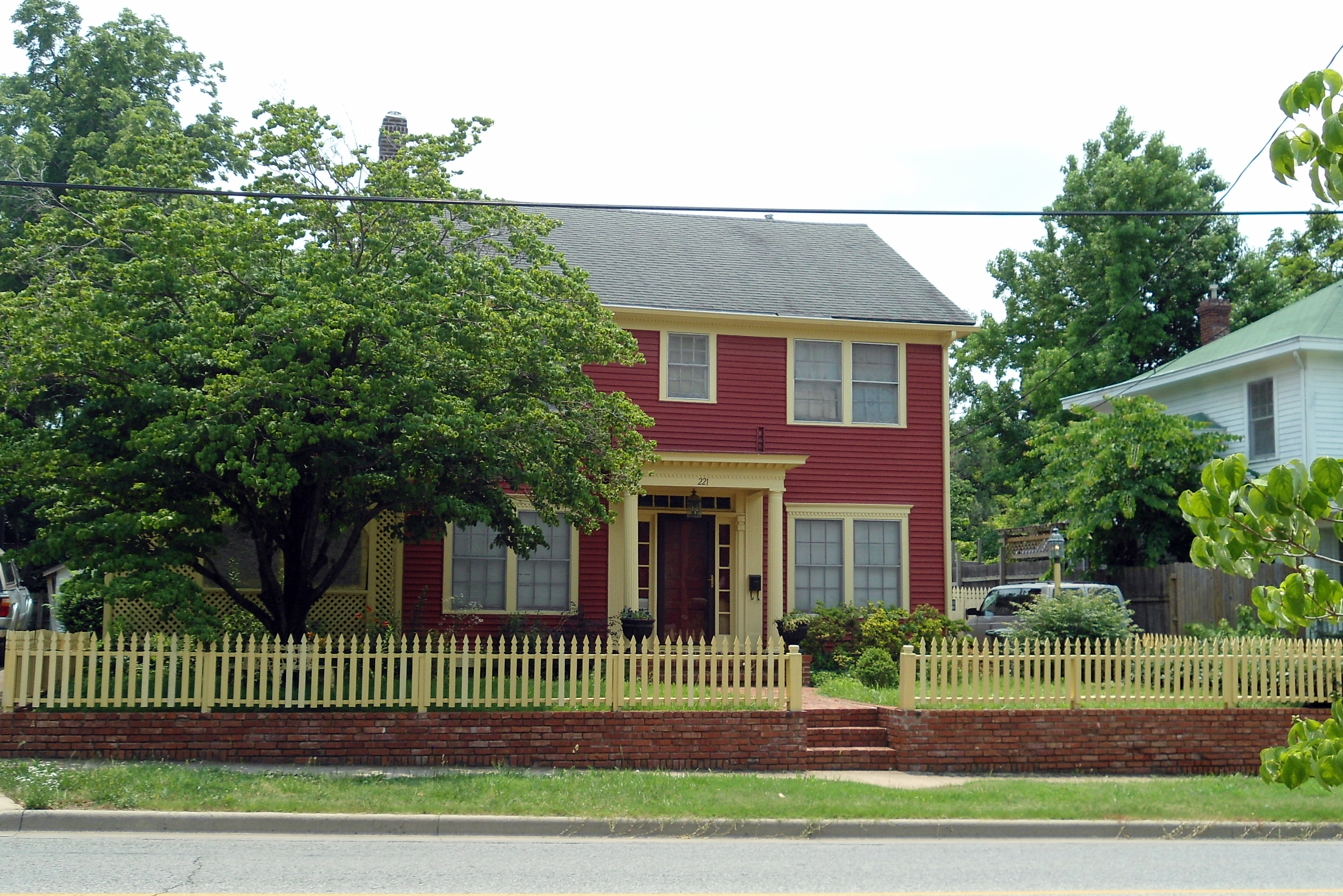
221 Lafayette

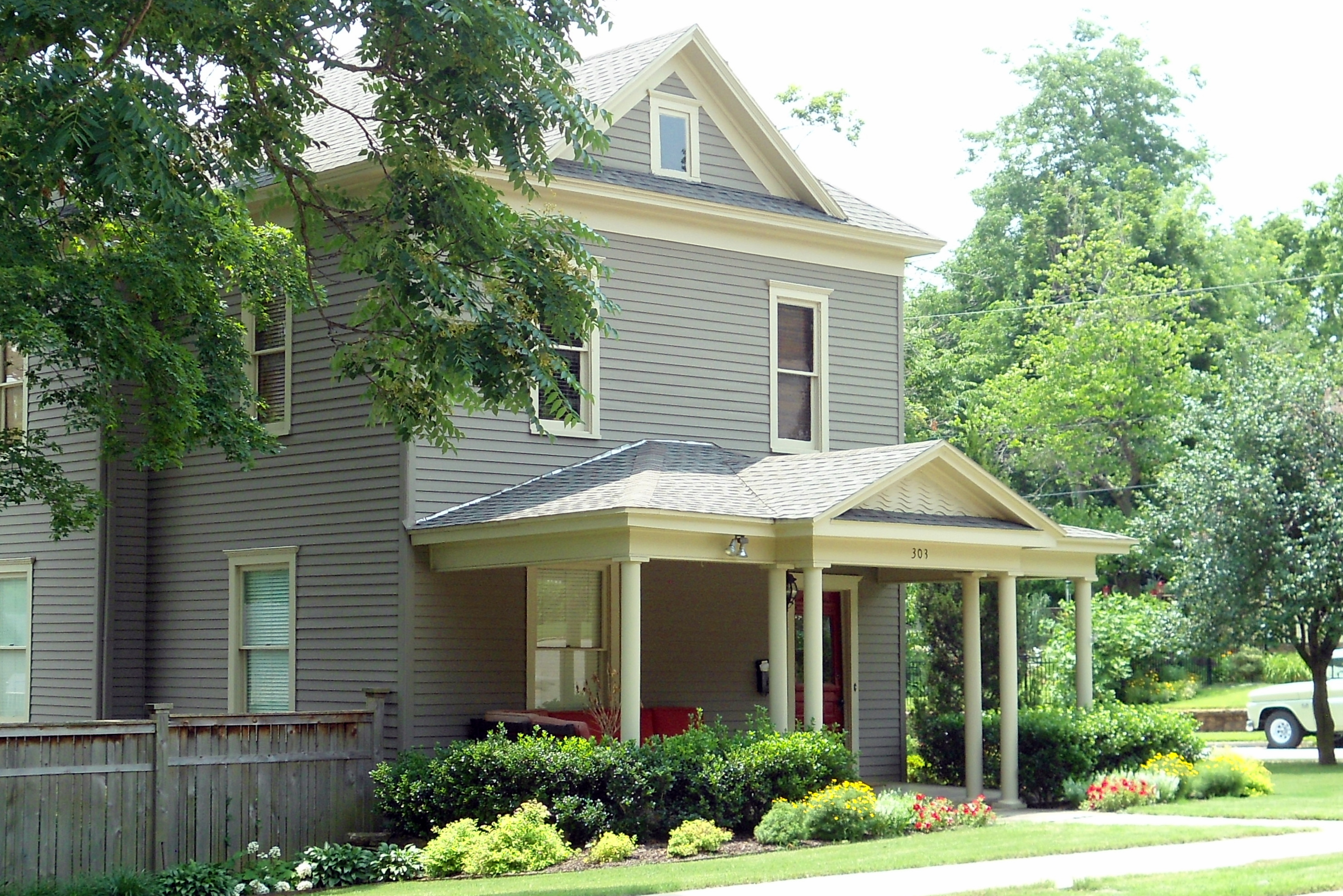
303 Sutton

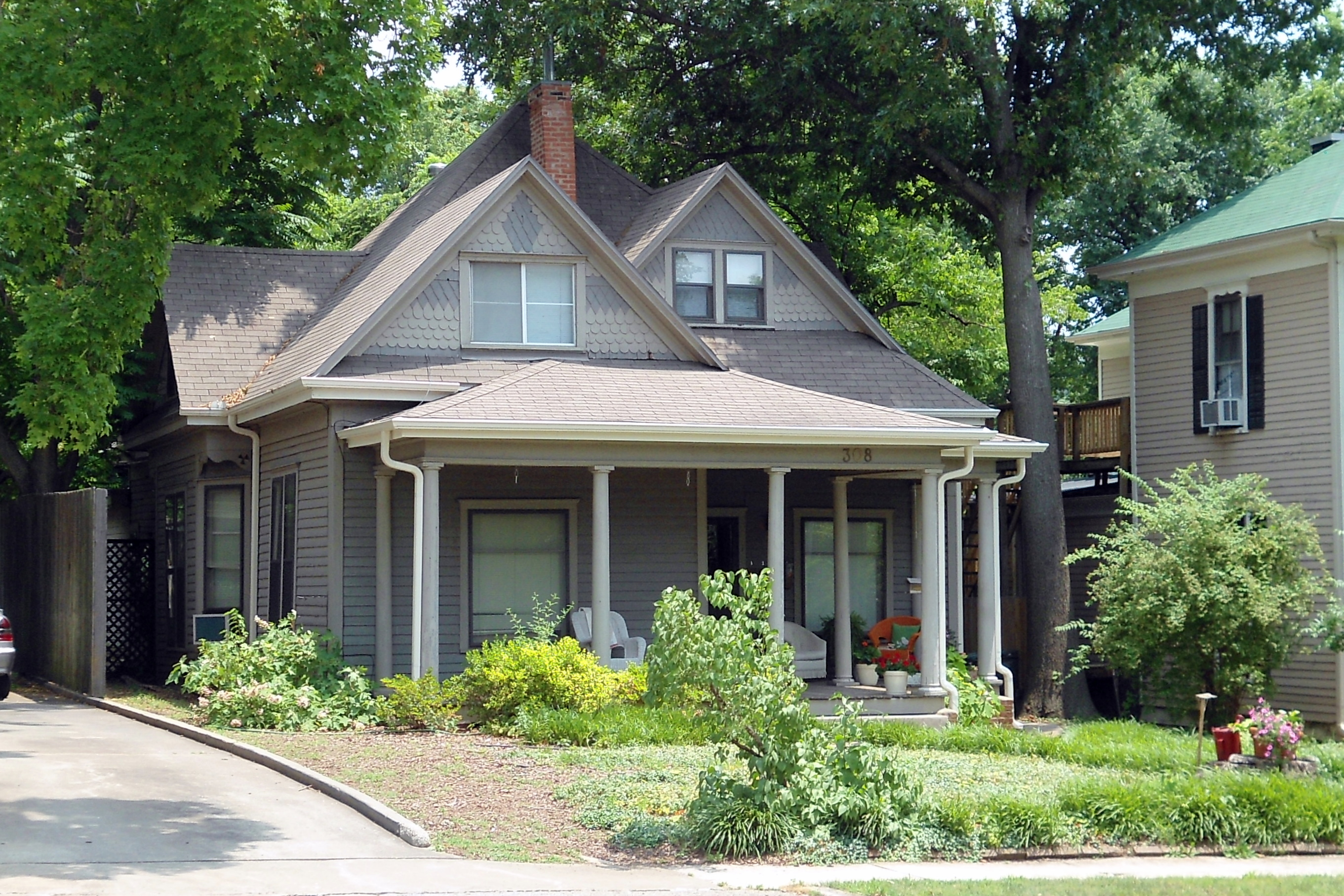
308 Washington

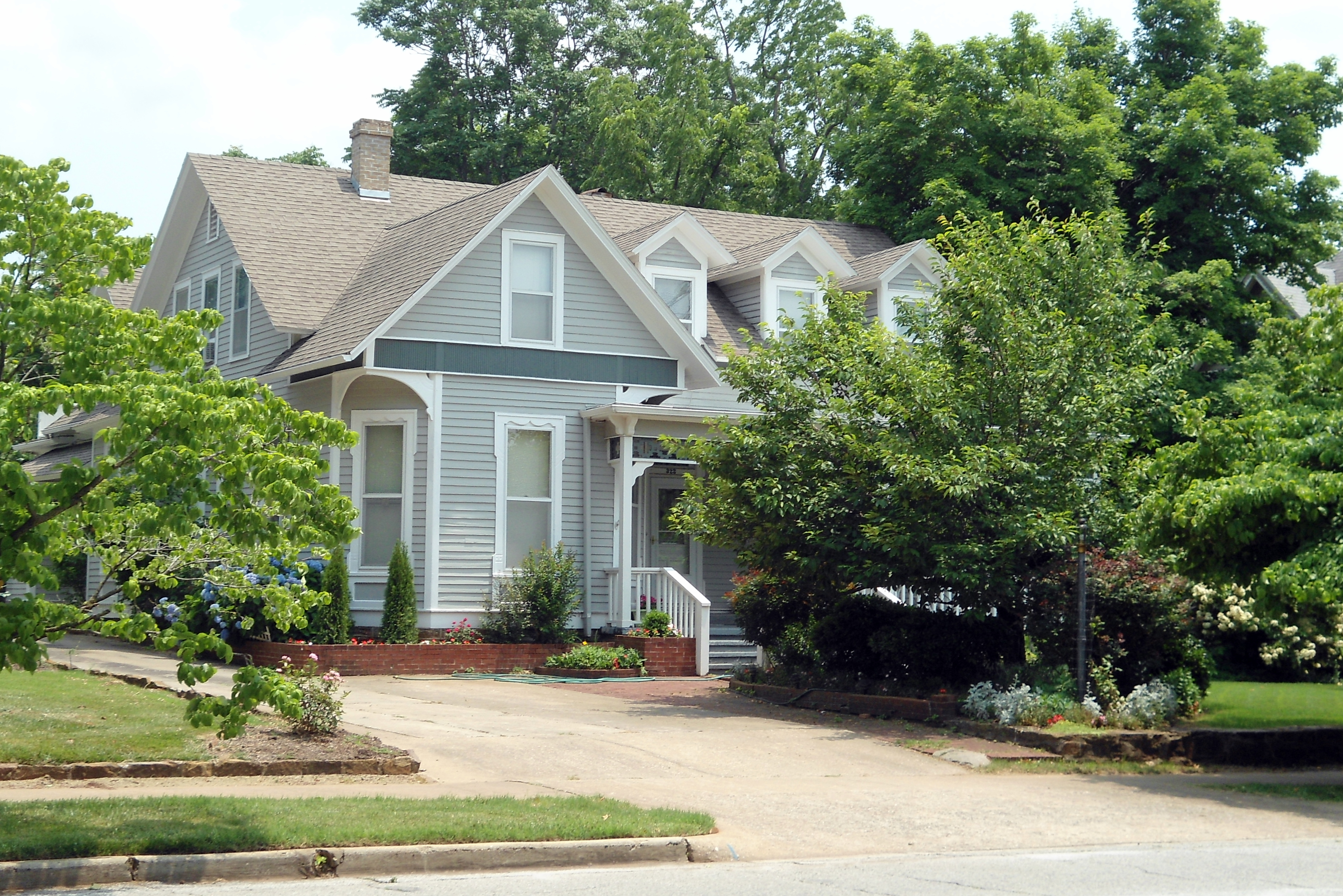
322 Washington

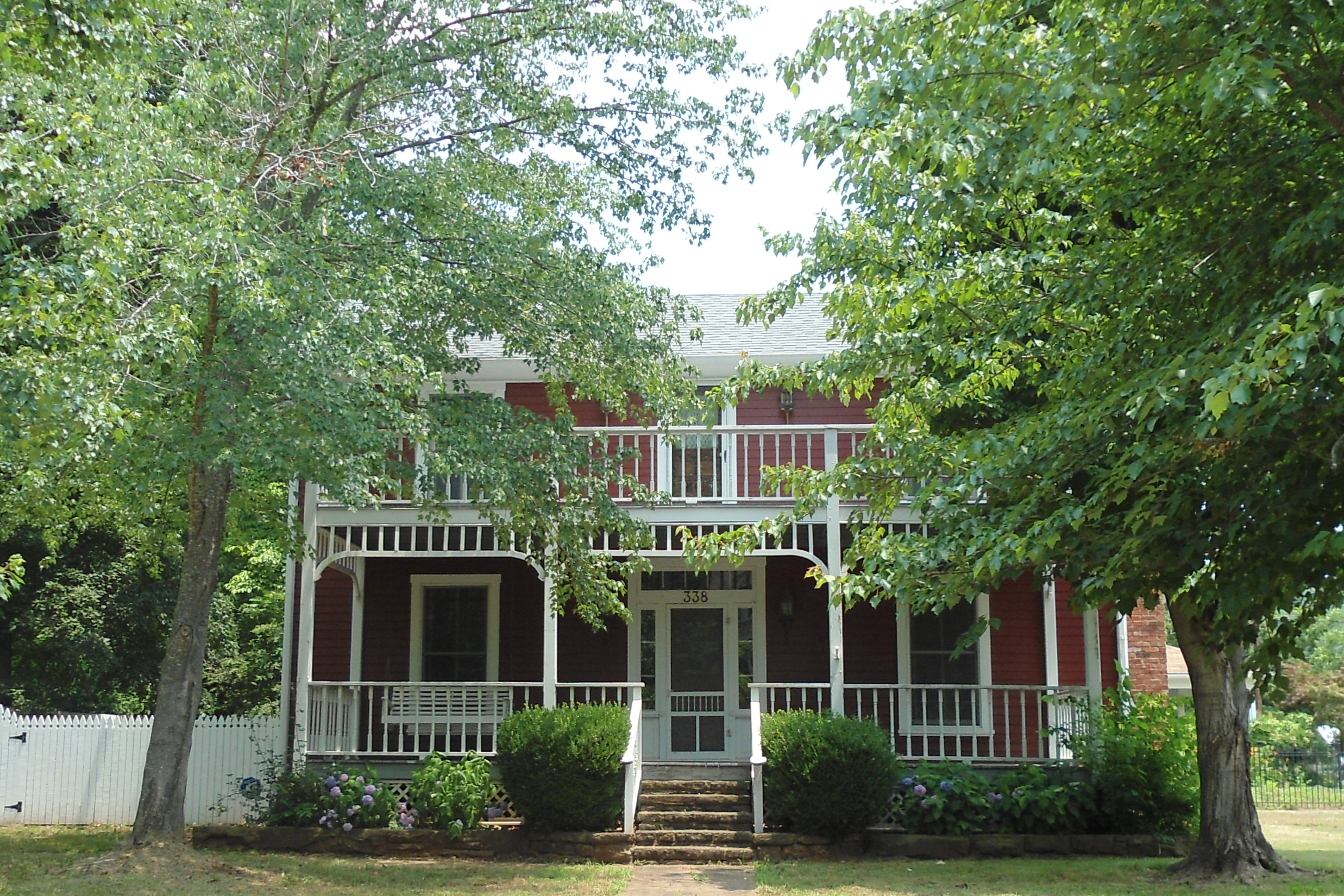
338 Washington

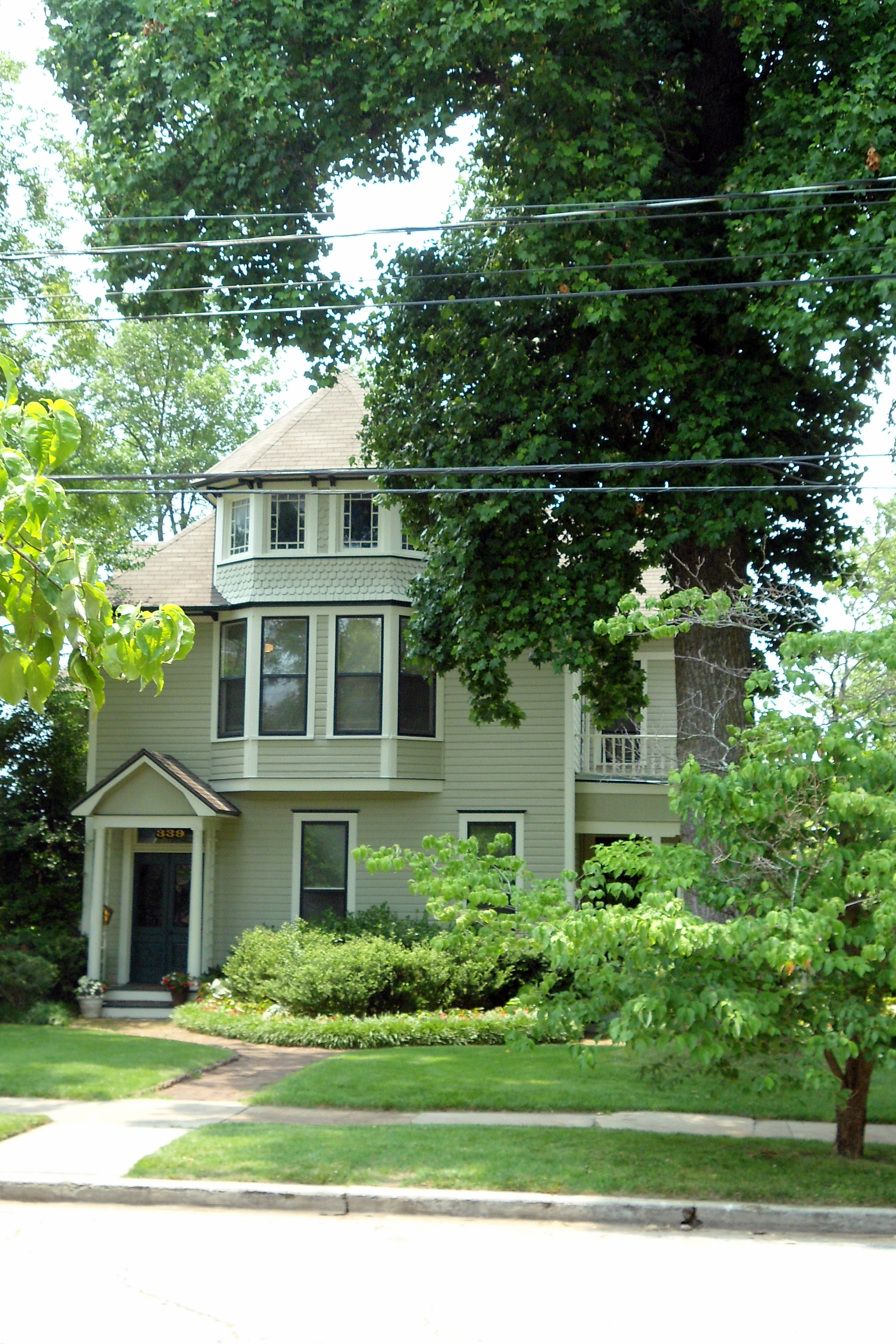
339 Washington

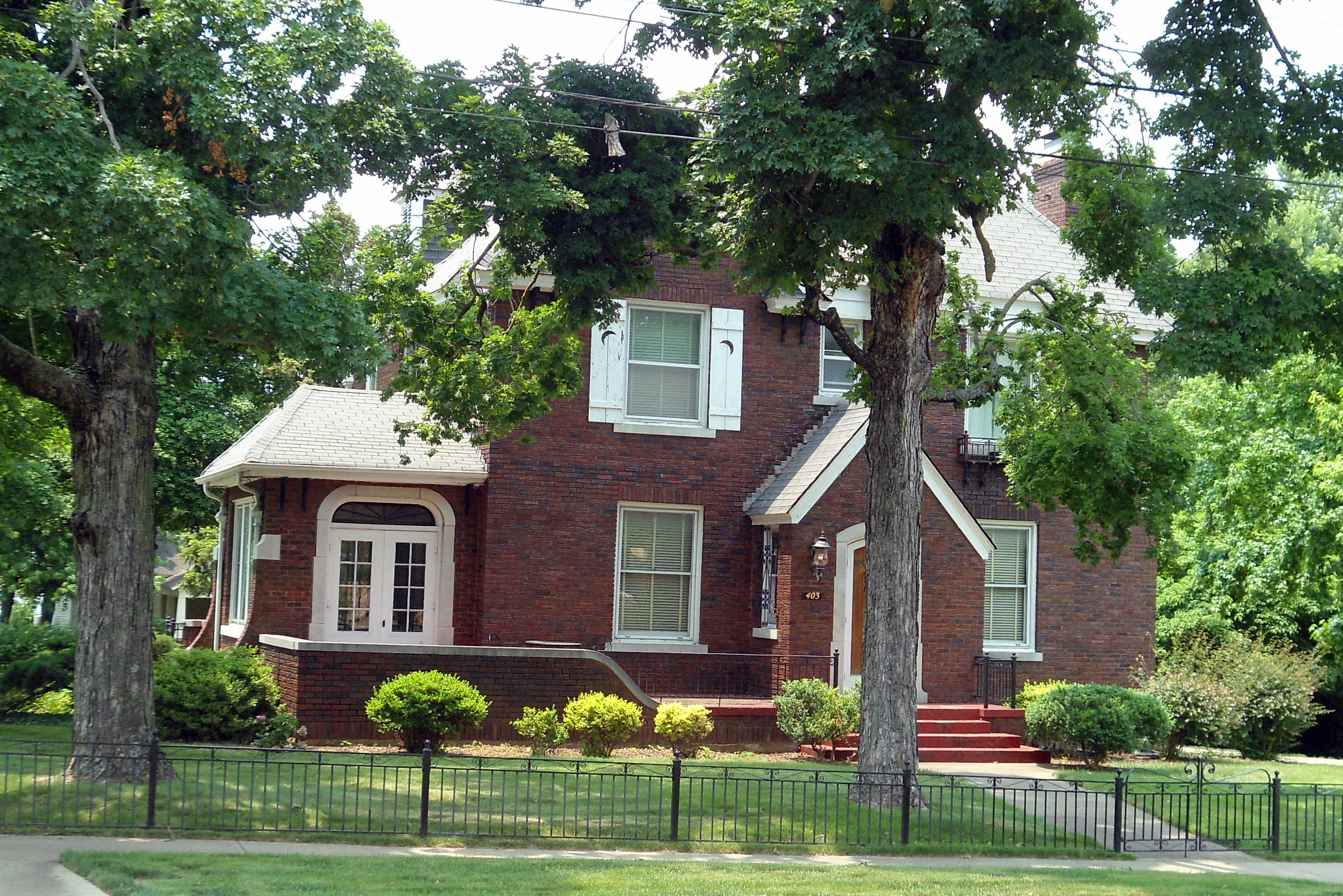
403 Washington

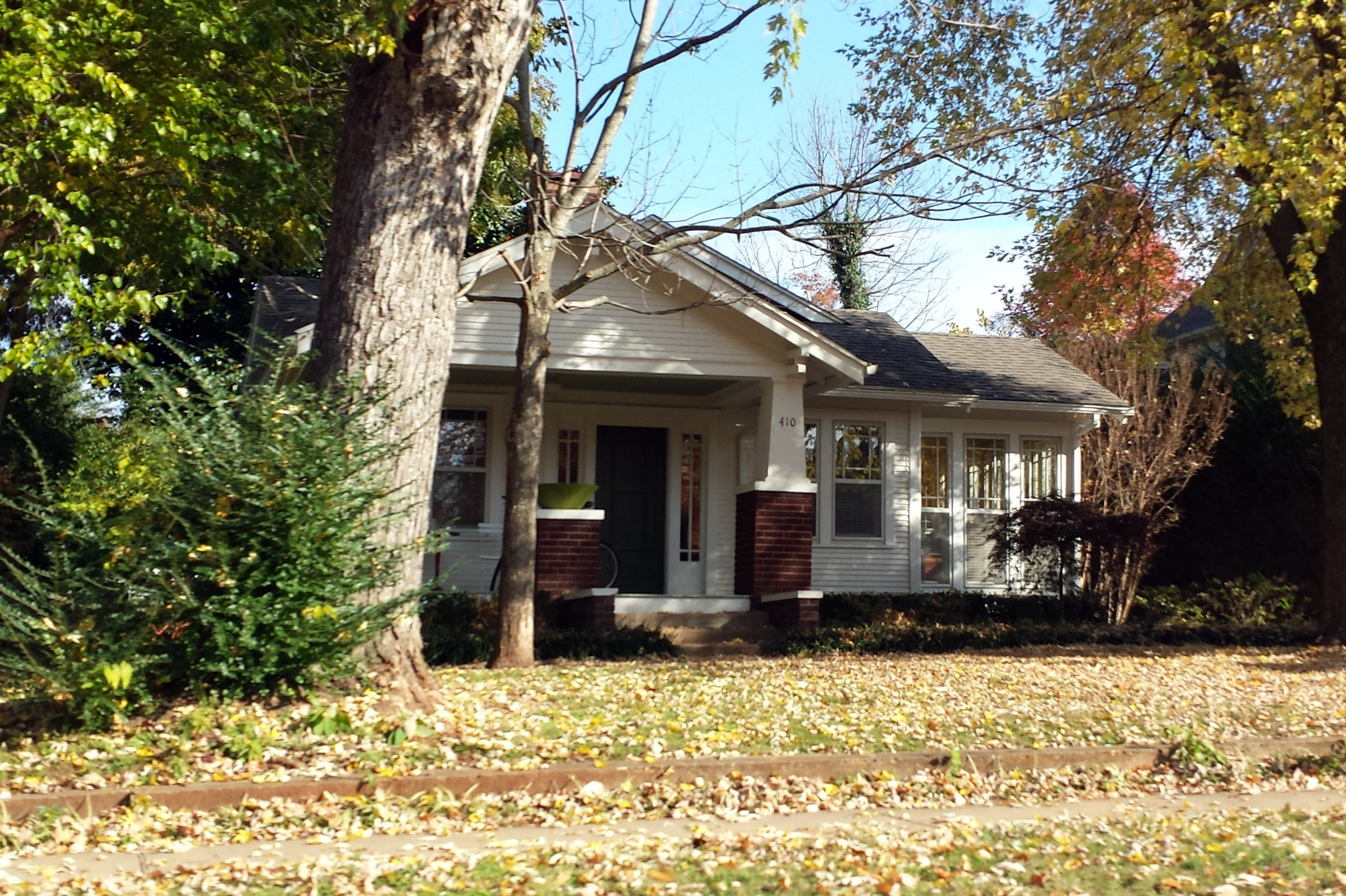
410 Washington

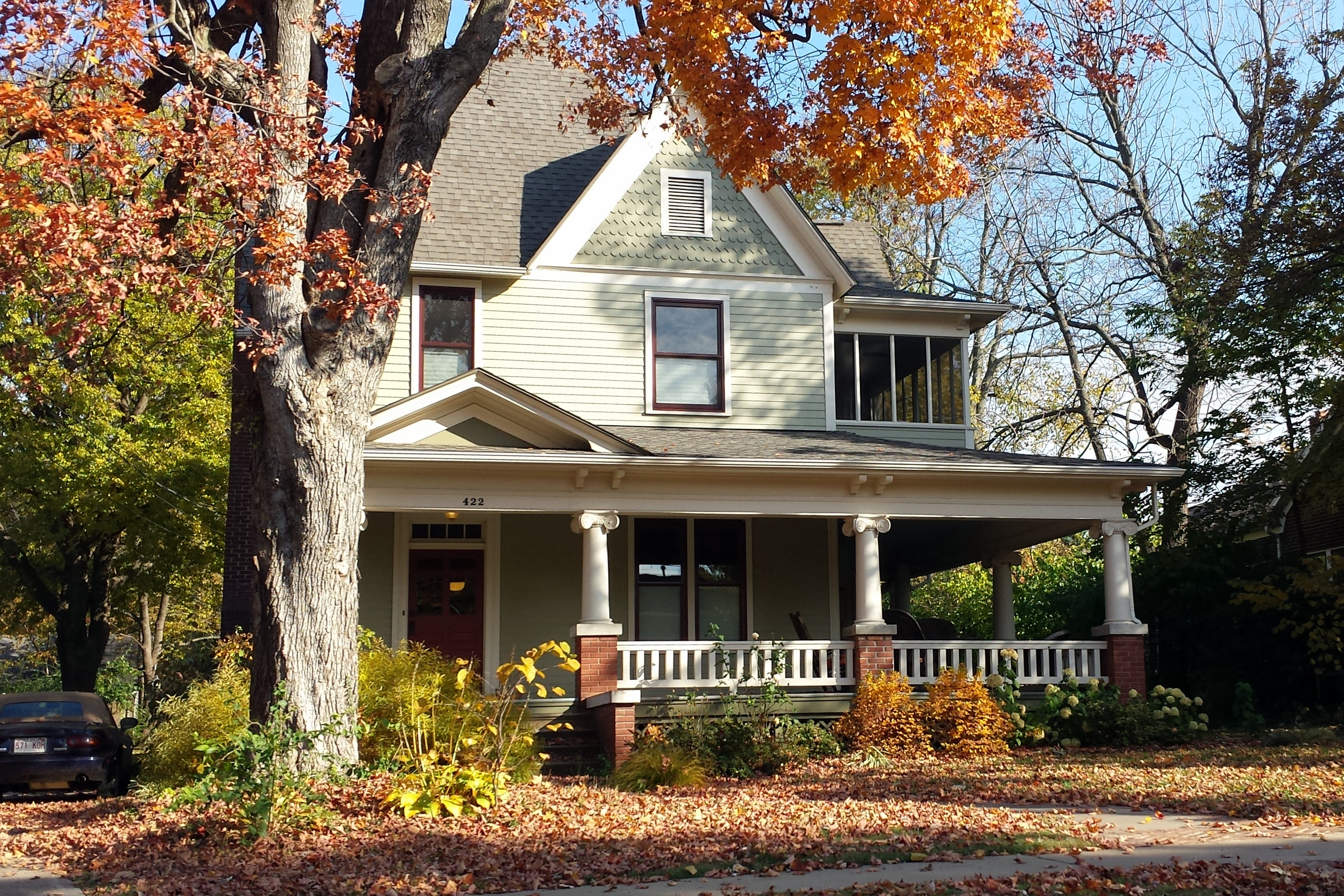
422 Washington

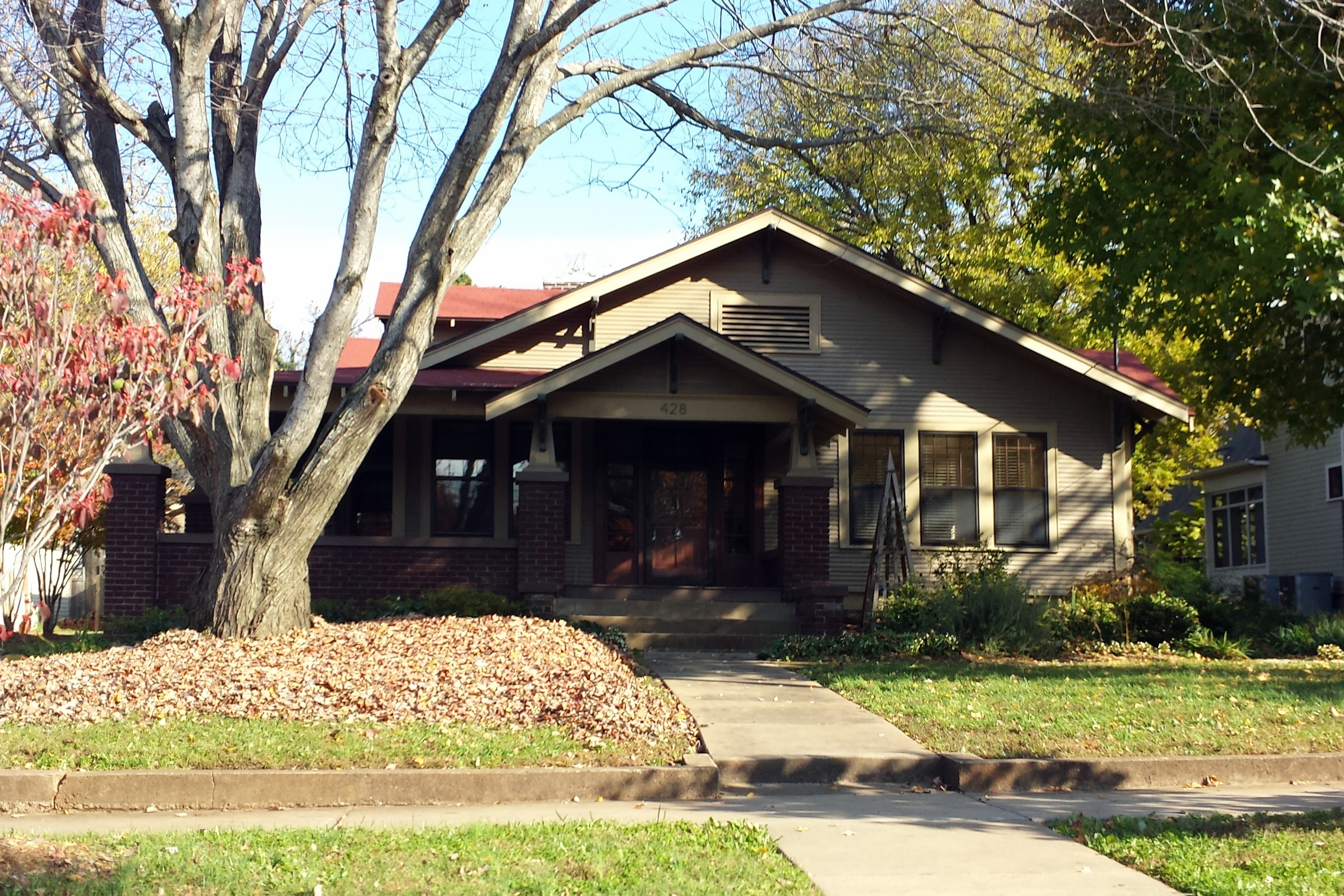
428 Washington

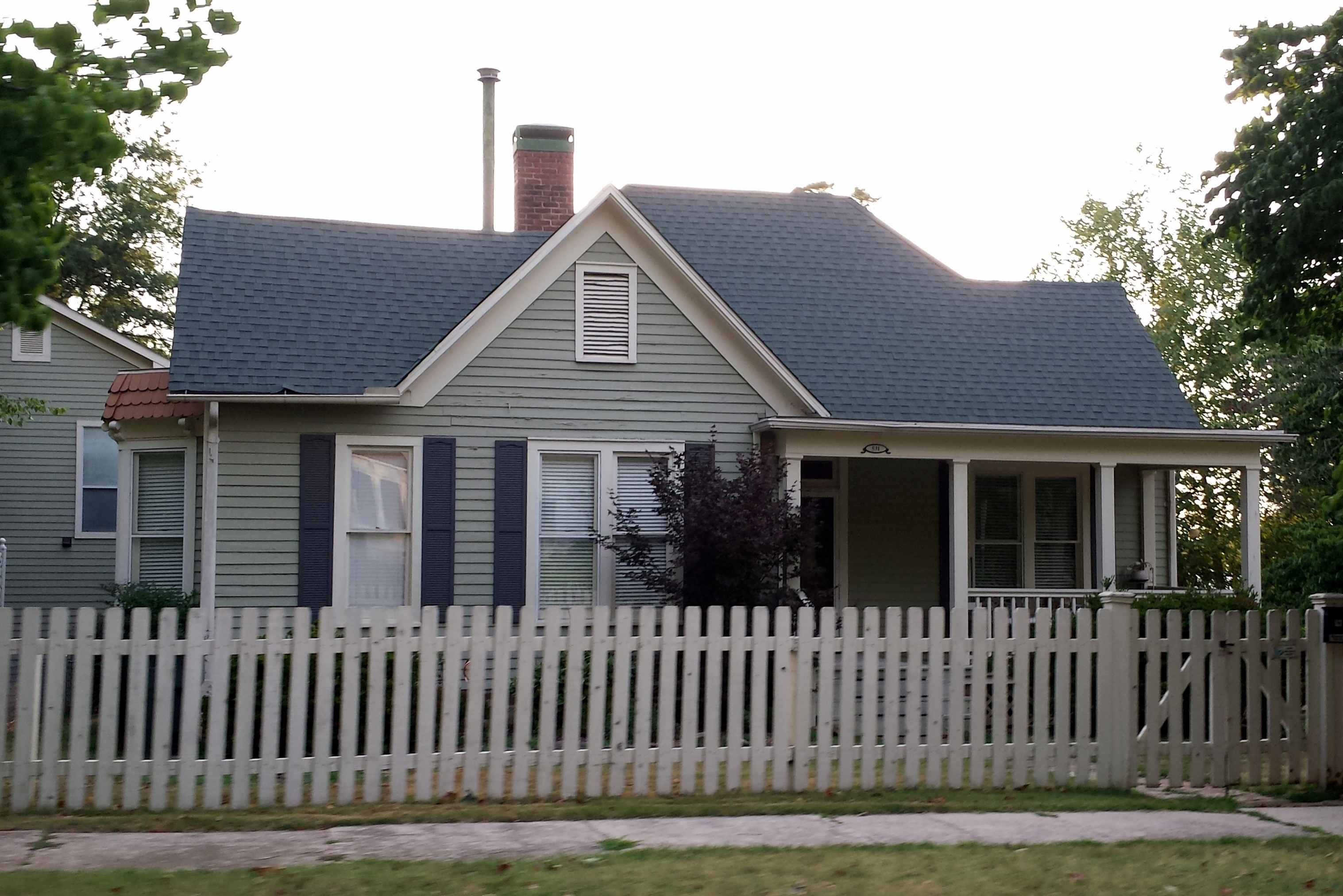
531 Washington

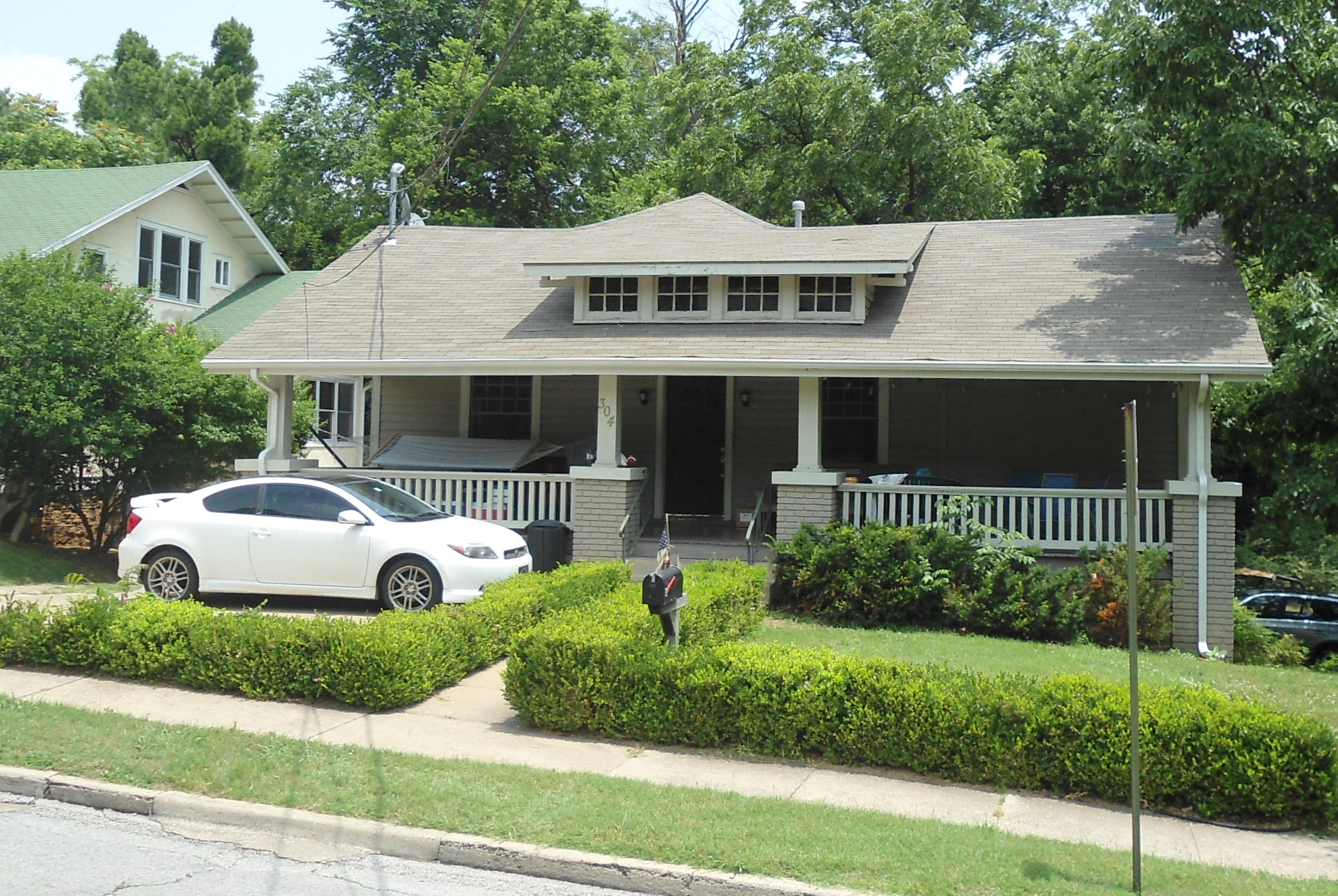
304 Willow

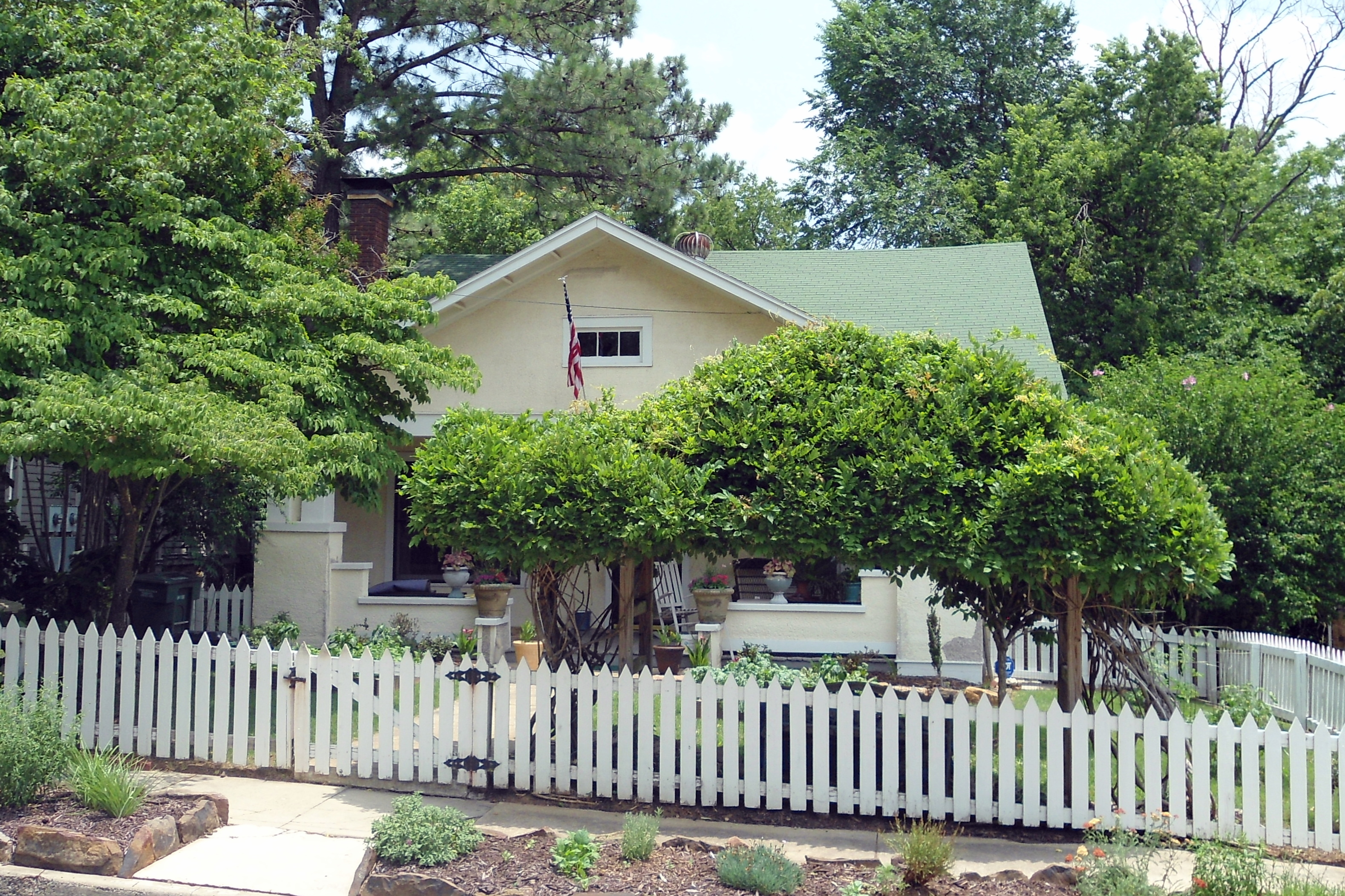
306 Willow

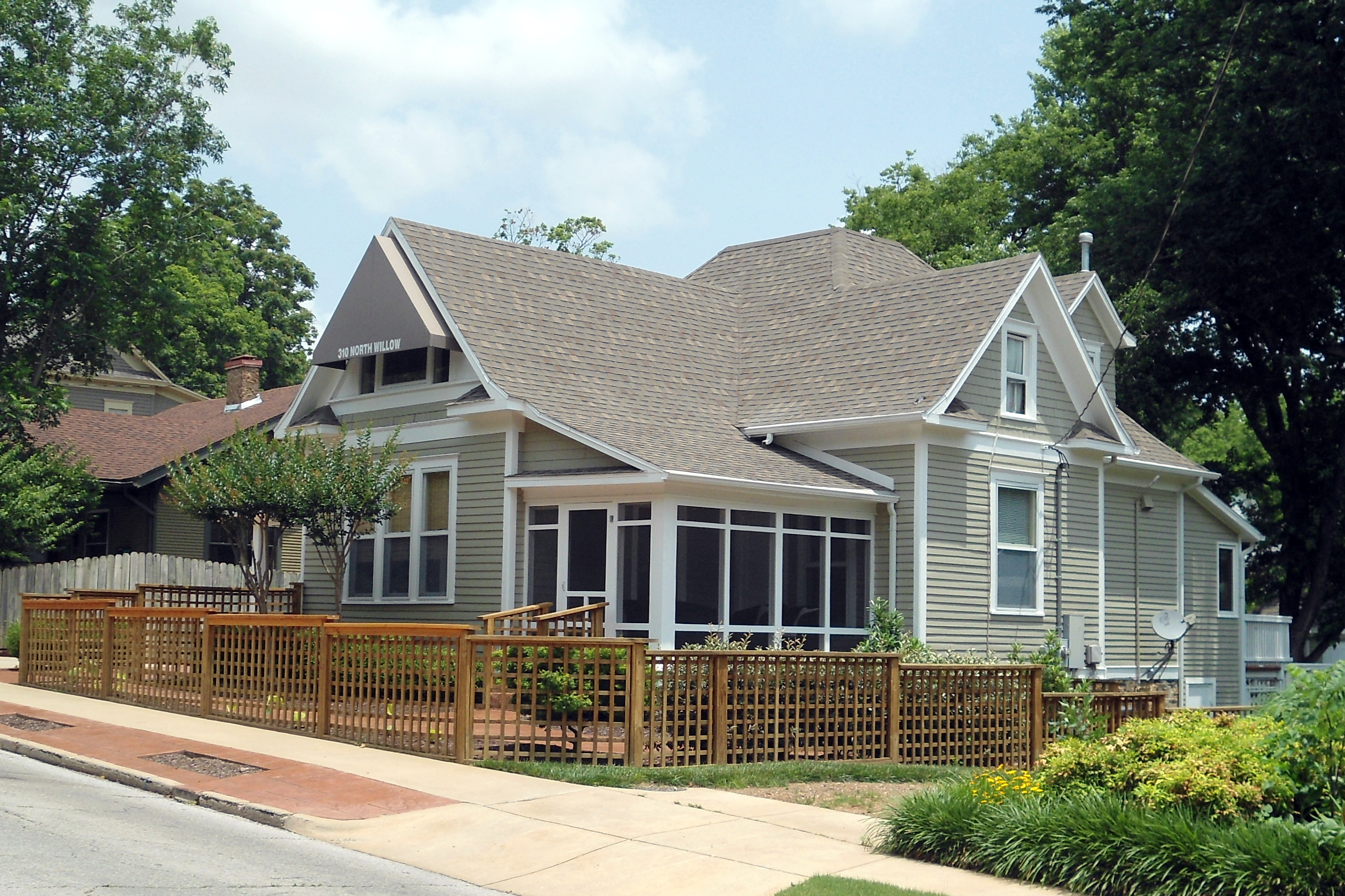
310 Willow

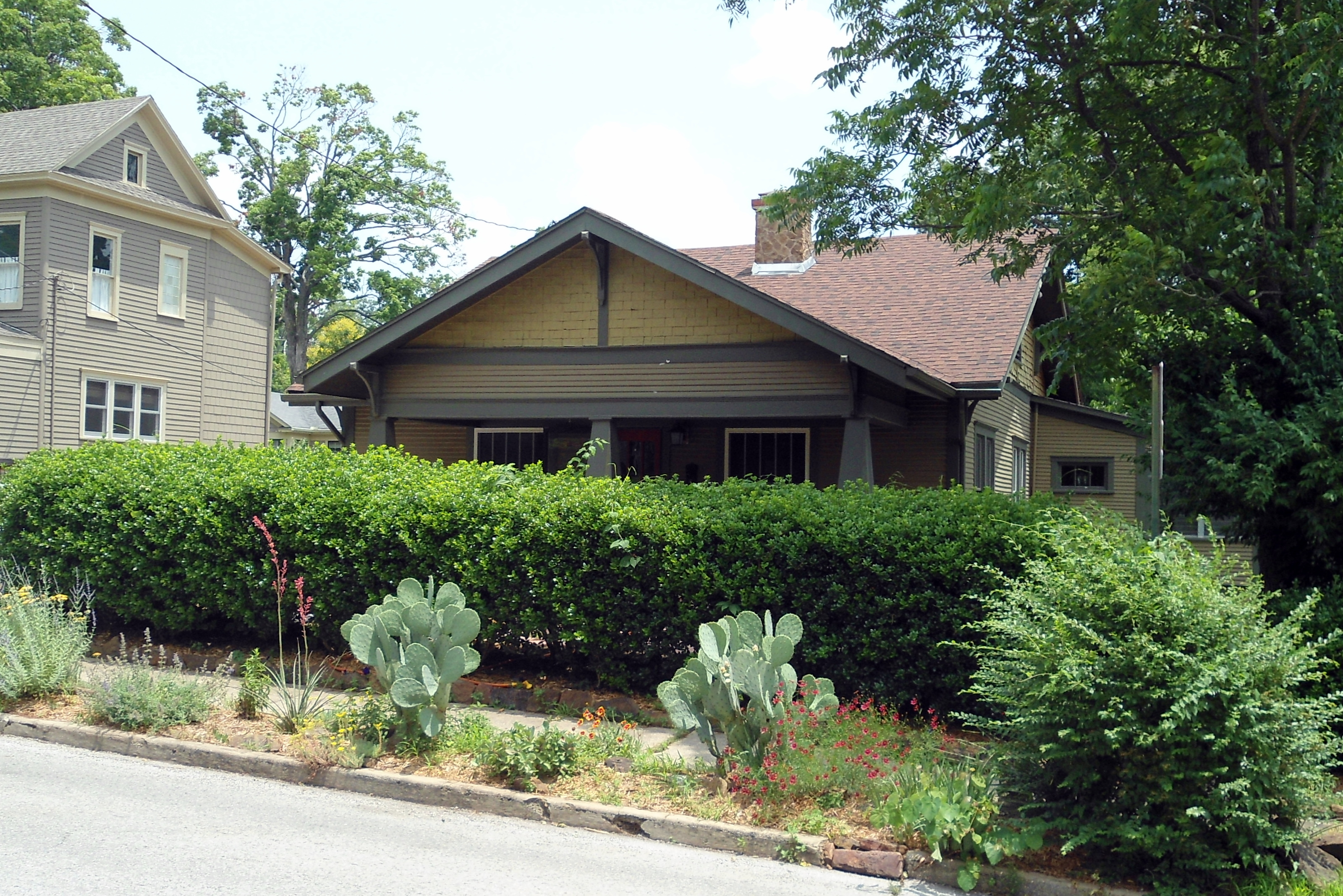
312 Willow

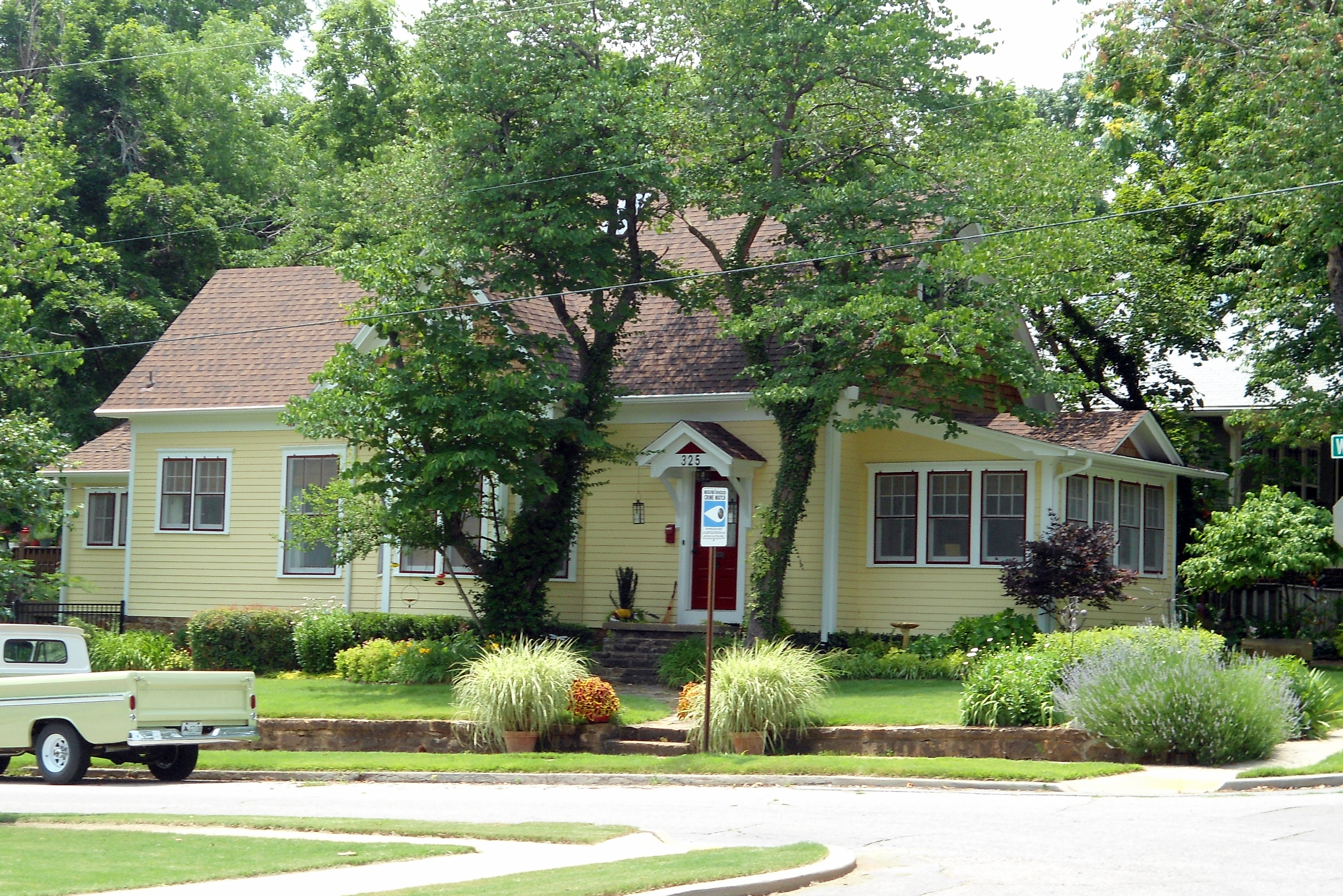
325 Willow

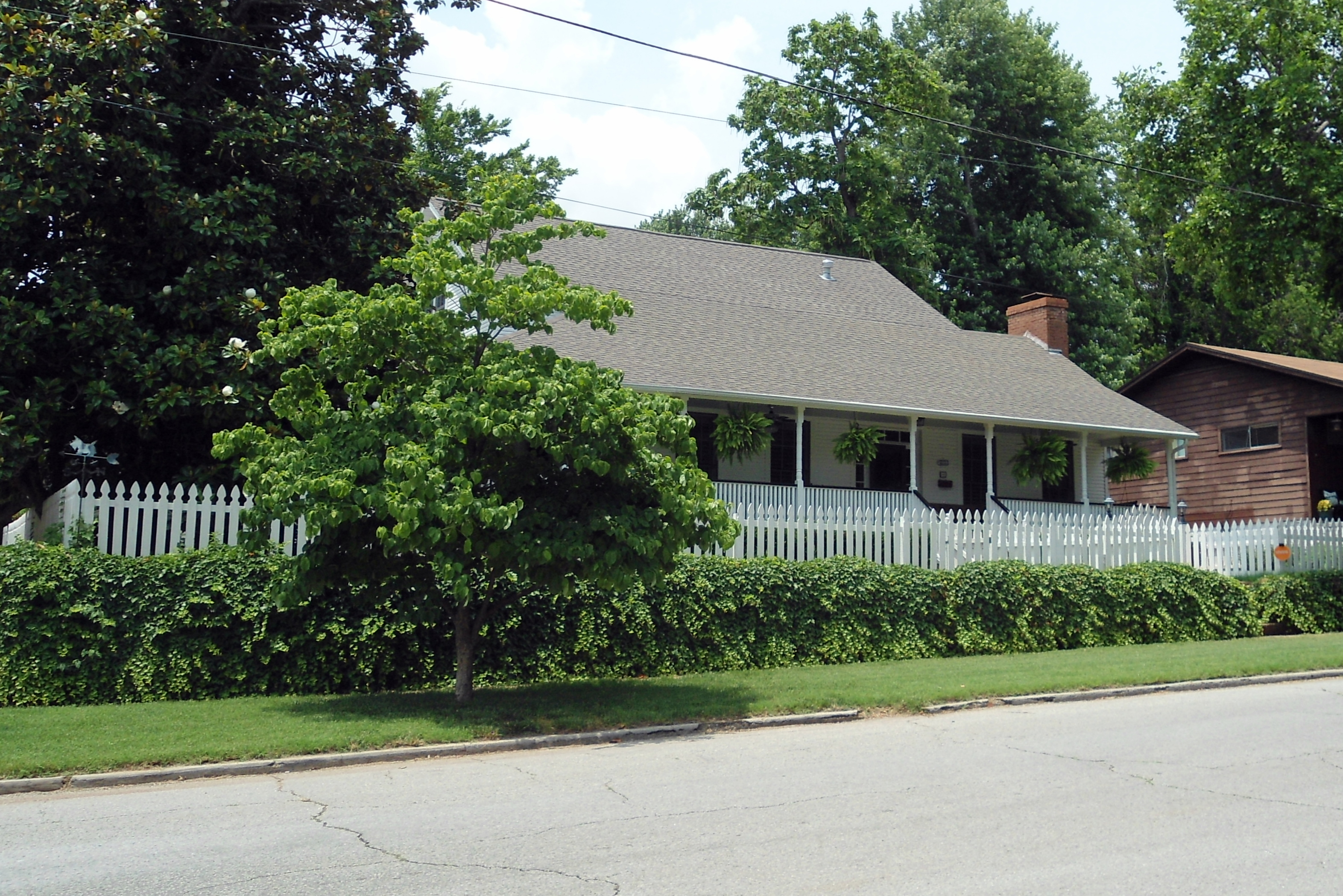
341 Willow

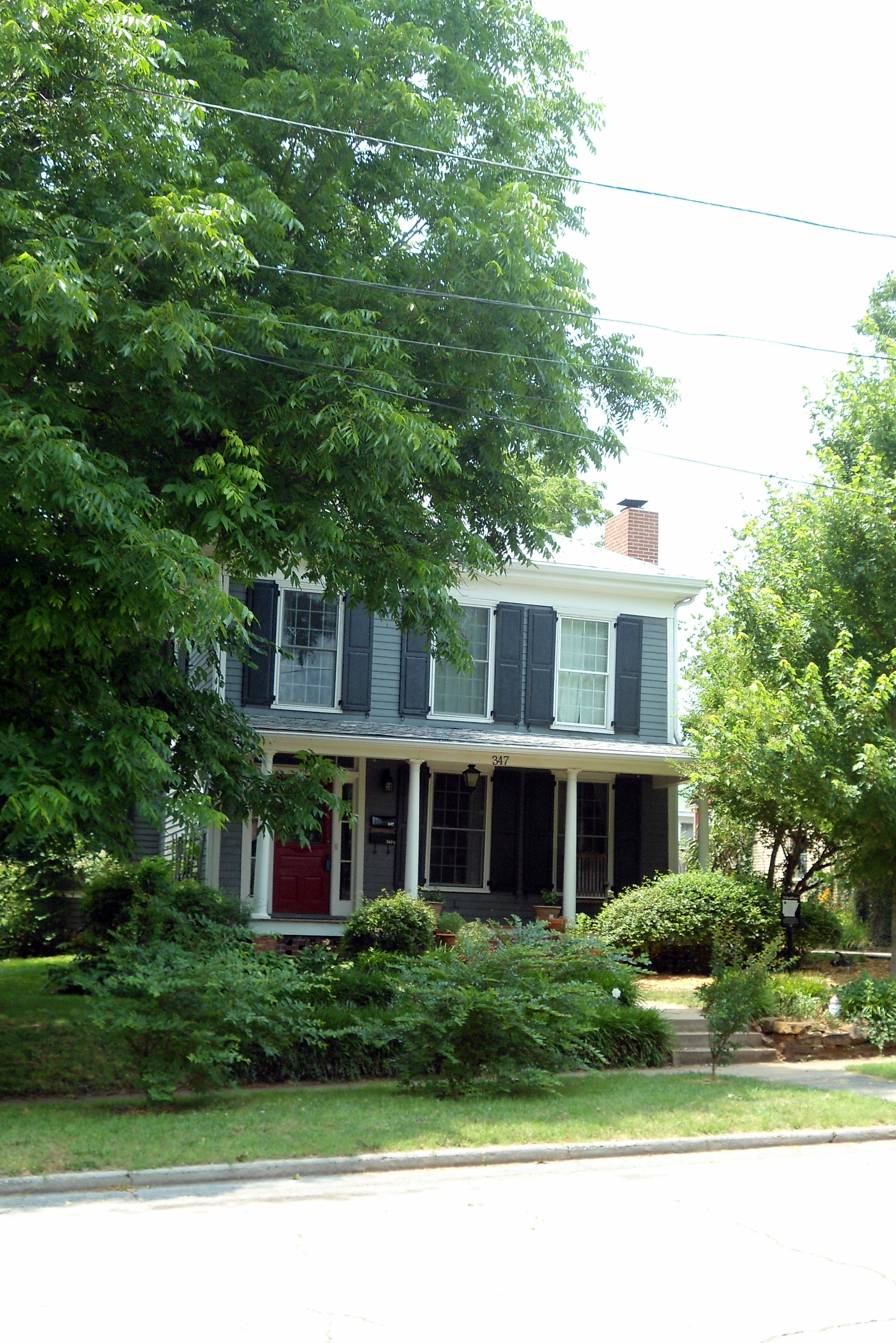
347 Willow

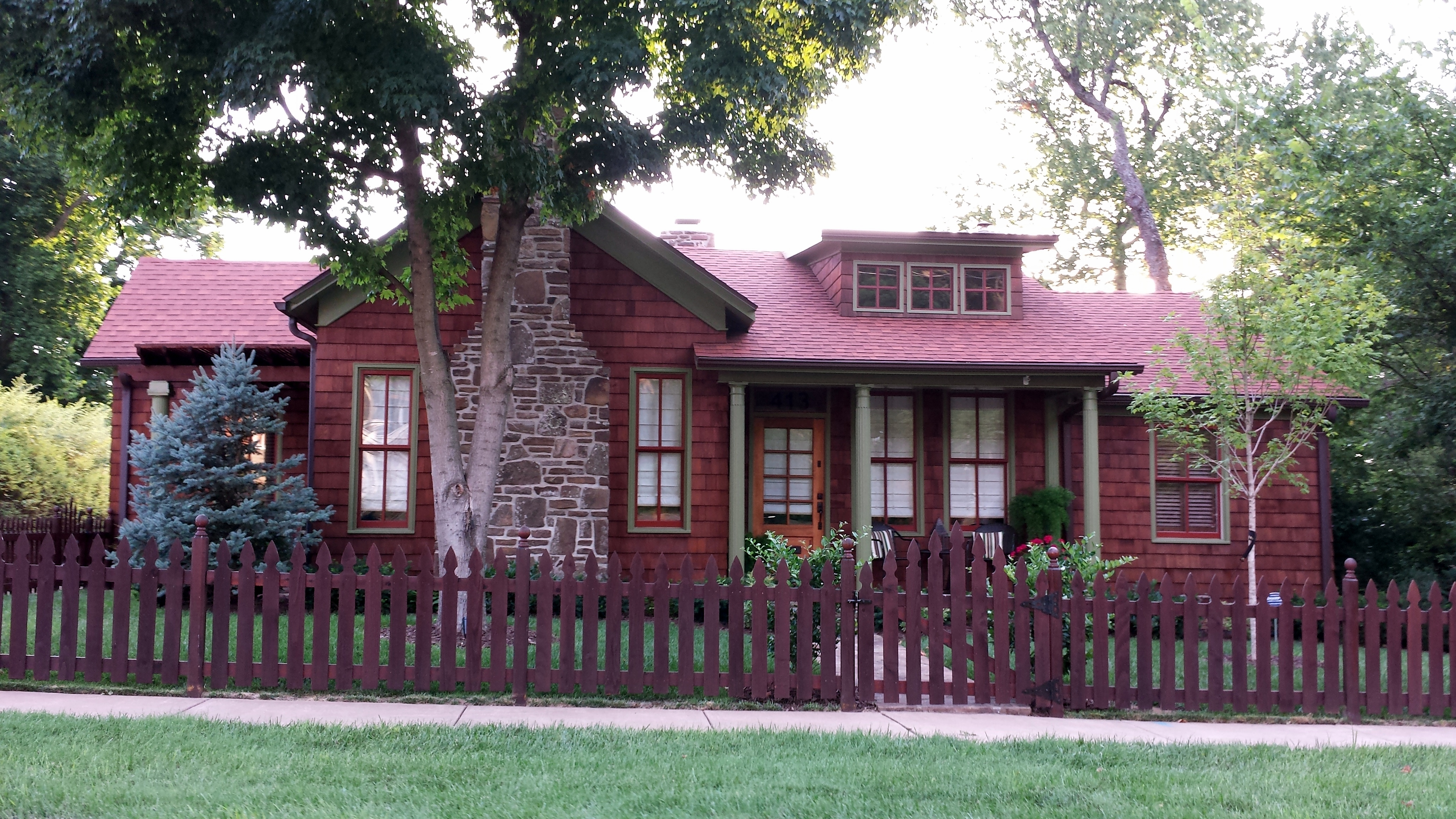
413 Willow

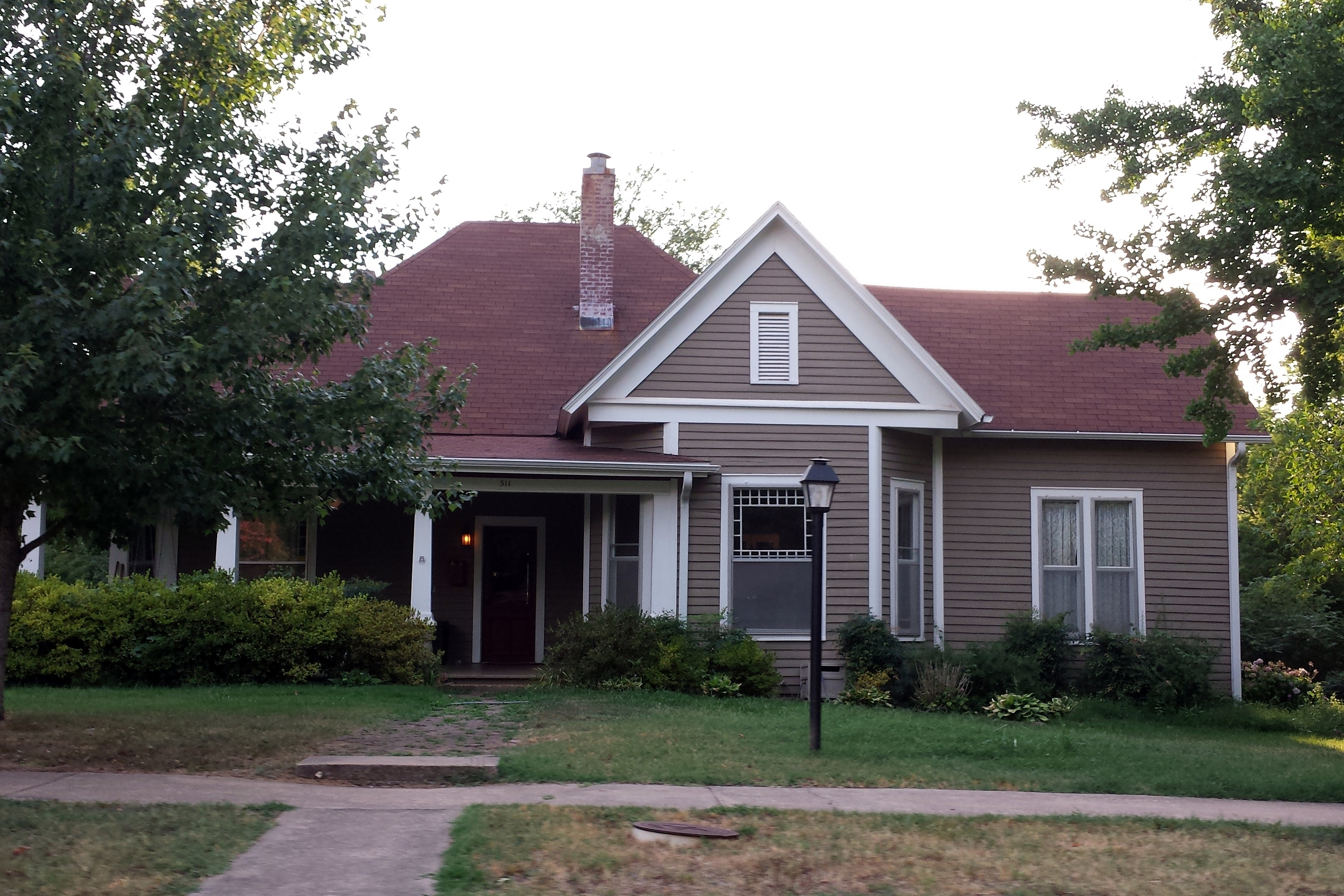
511 Willow

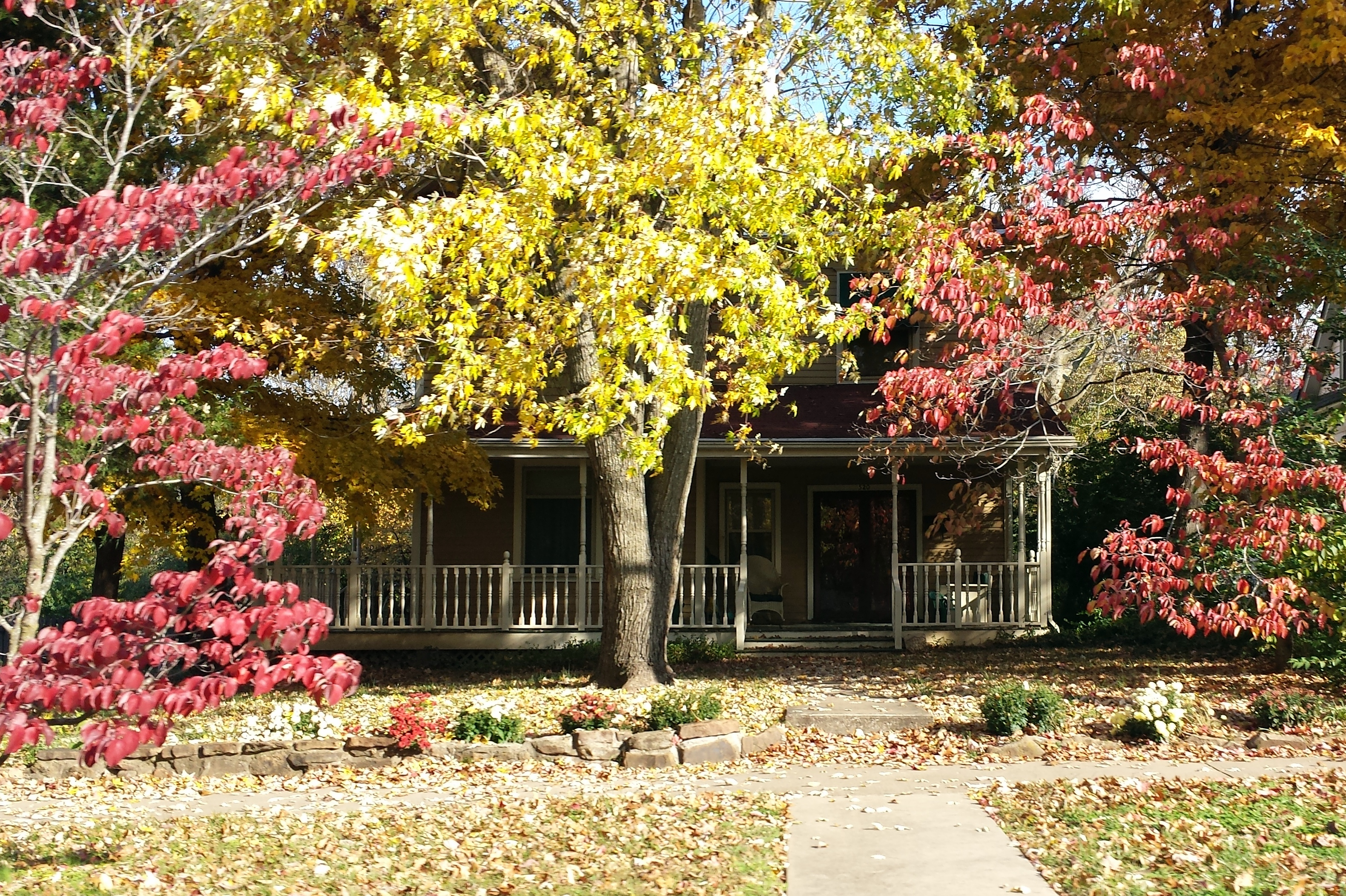
520 Willow

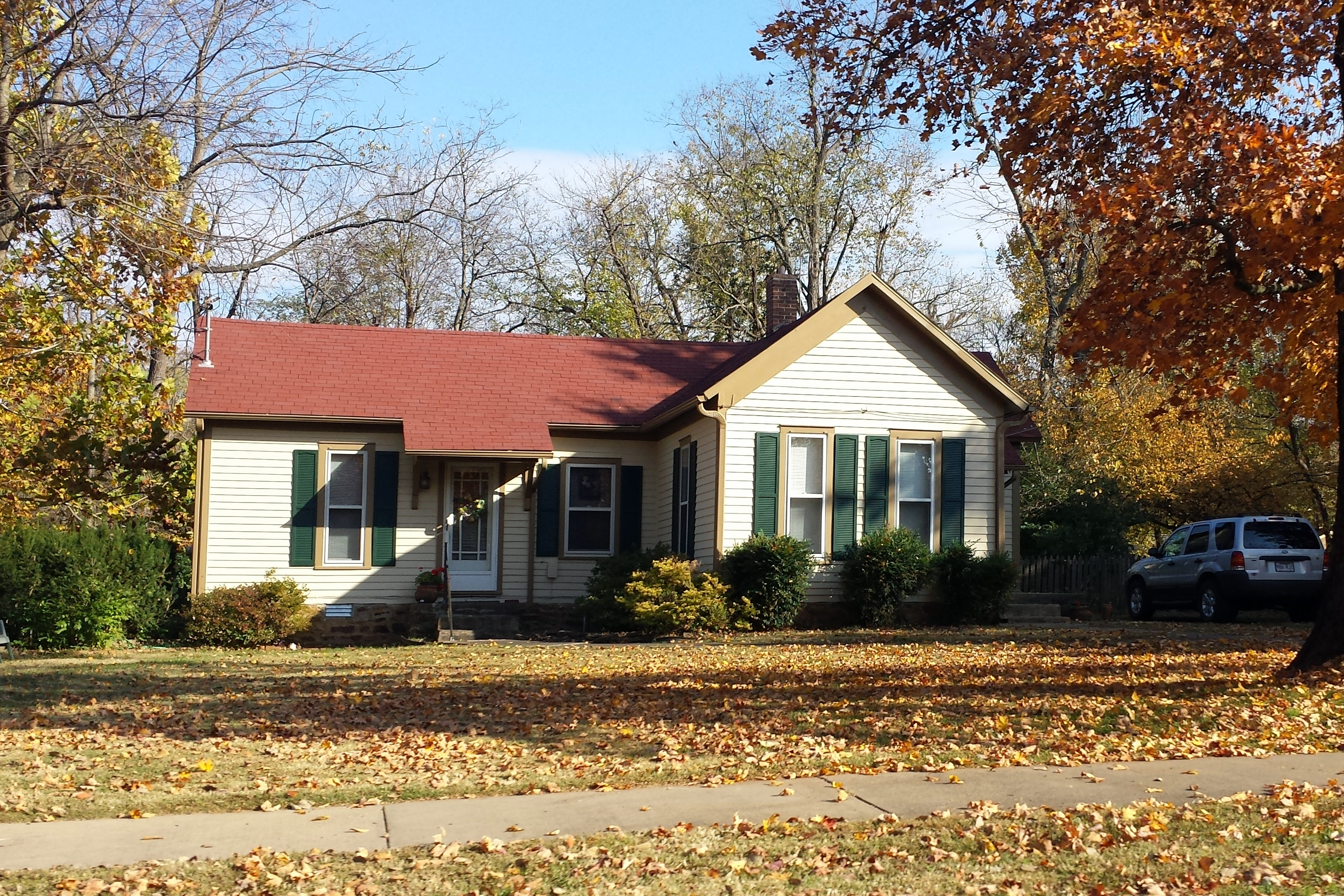
528 Willow

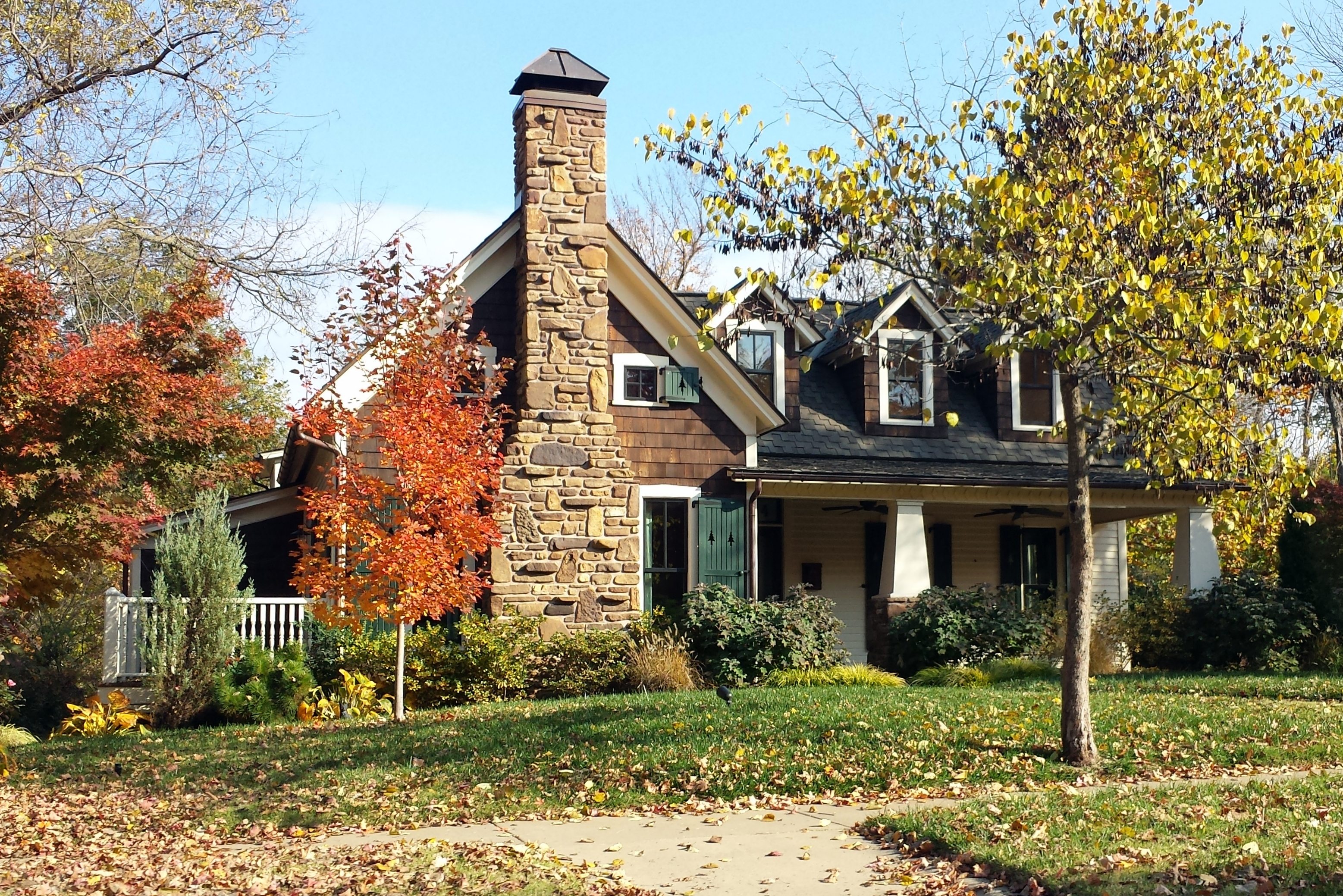
534 Willow

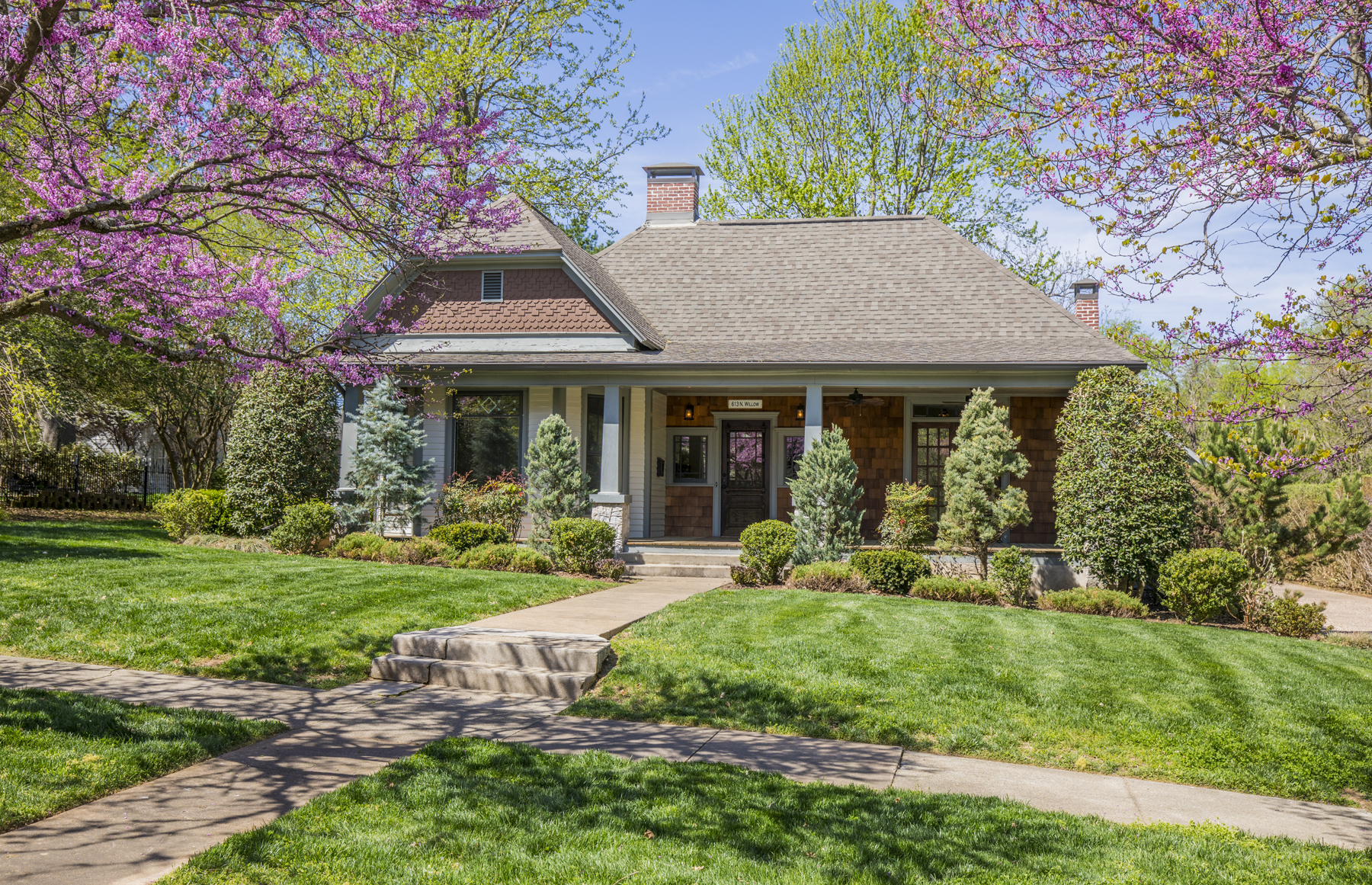
613 Willow

== See also ==
- National Register of Historic Places listings in Washington County, Arkansas
- Mount Nord Historic District
- Wilson Park Historic District
