= Herbert Fowler =

Herbert Fowler may refer to:

- George Herbert Fowler (1861–1940), English zoologist, historian and archivist
- William Herbert Fowler (also known as Herbert Fowler, 1856–1941), English cricketer
- Herb Fowler, American architect who lived at Deepwood House, Fayetteville, Arkansas, U.S.
