= Henry Pyeatte House =

Historic house in Arkansas, United States

- U.S. National Register of Historic Places
- Nearest city: Canehill, Arkansas
- Area: 2.5 acres (1.0 ha)
- Built: 1866
- MPS: Canehill MRA
- NRHP reference No.: 82000952
- Added to NRHP: November 17, 1982

The Henry Pyeatte House is a historic house near Canehill, Arkansas. Located on a rise west of Arkansas Highway 45, it is a vernacular wood-frame I-house structure, two stories high, with single-story ells attached to the eastern and western sides. A front-gable portico projects over the centered entrance, supported by box columns. The entrance is framed by sidelight windows, with a transom window above. The house was built in the 1860s by Henry Pyeatte, son of one of Canehill's founders, and is one of the community's best-preserved houses of the period.

The house was listed on the National Register of Historic Places in 1982.

== See also ==
- National Register of Historic Places listings in Washington County, Arkansas
