= John Tilley House =

Historic house in Arkansas, United States

- U.S. National Register of Historic Places
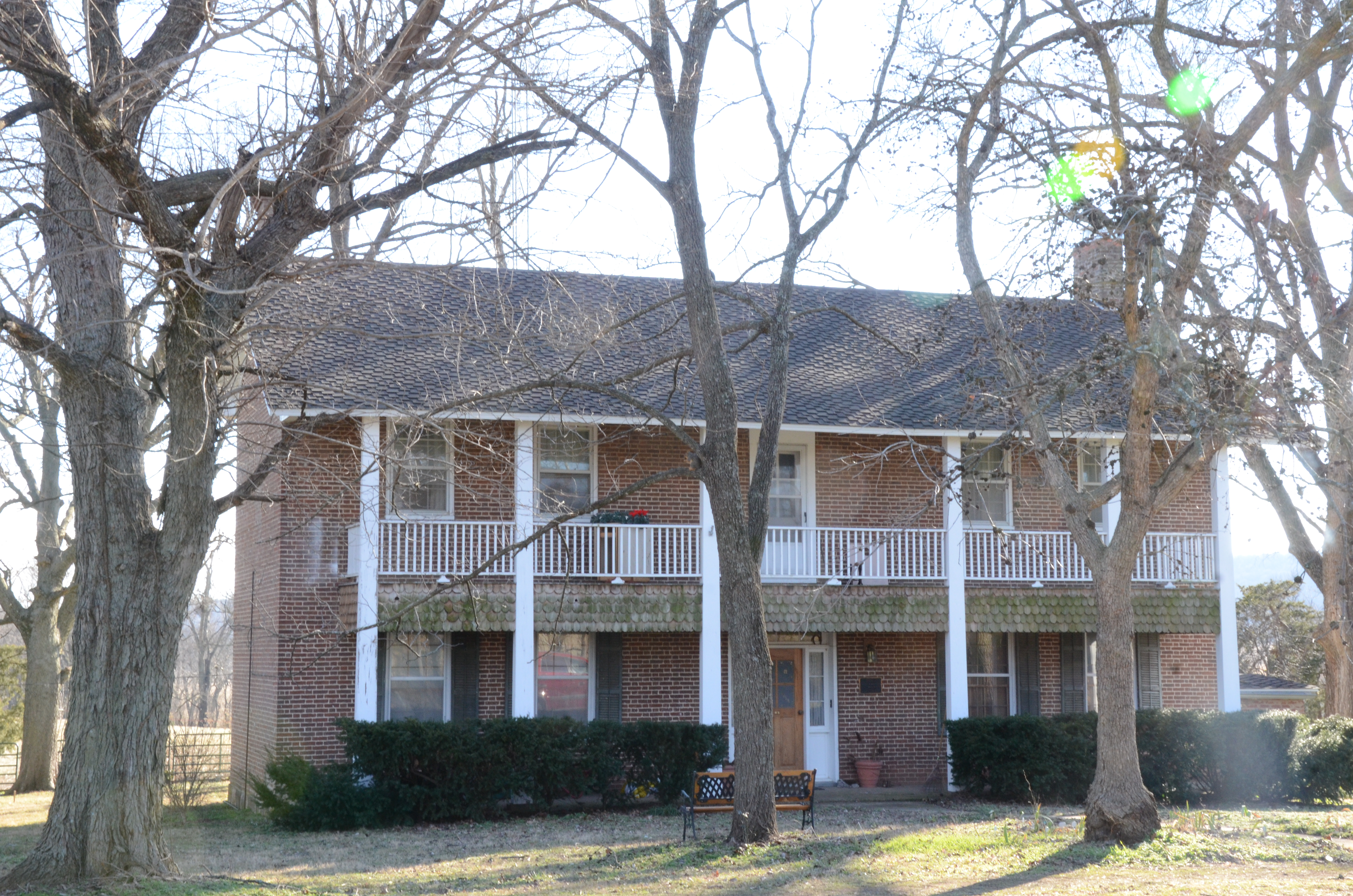

- Location within Arkansas Location within the United States
- Nearest city: Prairie Grove, Arkansas
- Coordinates: 35°59′34″N 94°23′09″W
- Area: 215 acres (87 ha)
- Built: 1855
- Architect: John Tilley
- NRHP reference No.: 78000639
- Added to NRHP: November 2, 1978

The John Tilley House is a historic house in rural Washington County, Arkansas, United States. It is located on the south side of Stonewall Road (County Road 64), west of Prairie Grove, and is one of the county's few rural antebellum brick houses. It is one of only 24 antebellum houses in Arkansas deemed sufficiently "original" for inclusion on the National Register.

It is a two-story structure, five bays wide, with two rooms on each floor, separated by a central hallway on each level. A two-story, Victorian Era (1896) porch extends across the front of the house. There is also a considerable Victorian Era addition in the back (1896), which gives the house its present "T" footprint. The house was built by John Tilley, Jr. about 1853, replacing his first house, which was a log structure (1836), and first appeared on the Washington County tax rolls in 1855. Tilley was one of the area's most successful farmers prior to the American Civil War, but fled the area to Texas when it was occupied by the Union Army and died before he could return.

The house was listed on the National Register of Historic Places in 1978.

== See also ==
- National Register of Historic Places listings in Washington County, Arkansas
