= Nathan Combs House =

Historic house in Arkansas, United States

- U.S. National Register of Historic Places
- Nearest city: Fayetteville, Arkansas
- Area: less than one acre
- Built: 1868
- NRHP reference No.: 76000472
- Added to NRHP: December 12, 1976

The Nathan Combs House is a historic house located in Washington County, Arkansas.

== Description and history ==
Set on a 480-acre (190 ha) estate, it is a two-story brick house, built in the late 1860s by one of the region's largest landowners. The house is noted for its dignified Italianate styling, including decorative brackets and a two-story front porch.

The house and its immediate surroundings were listed on the National Register of Historic Places on December 12, 1976.

== See also ==
- National Register of Historic Places listings in Washington County, Arkansas
