= Walker House (Fayetteville, Arkansas) =

Historic house in Arkansas, United States

- U.S. National Register of Historic Places
- Location within Arkansas Location within the United States
- Location: Knerr Rd., Fayetteville, Arkansas
- Coordinates: 36°3′29″N 94°8′59″W
- Area: 7 acres (2.8 ha)
- Built: 1872
- Architect: W.Z. Mayes
- Architectural style: Georgian
- NRHP reference No.: 75000417
- Added to NRHP: June 10, 1975

The Walker House is a historic house on South Knerr Drive in Fayetteville, Arkansas. The oldest portion of this two-story brick T-shaped house was built in 1872 by David Walker, a prominent local lawyer, judge, politician, and landowner. Its main facade is covered by a two-story porch with ornamental carved brackets. The rear extension was added in 1878. The house has been in the hands of Knerr family descendants since 1910.

The house was listed on the National Register of Historic Places in 1975.

== See also ==
- National Register of Historic Places listings in Washington County, Arkansas
