= R.L. Leach Grocery Store =

- U.S. National Register of Historic Places
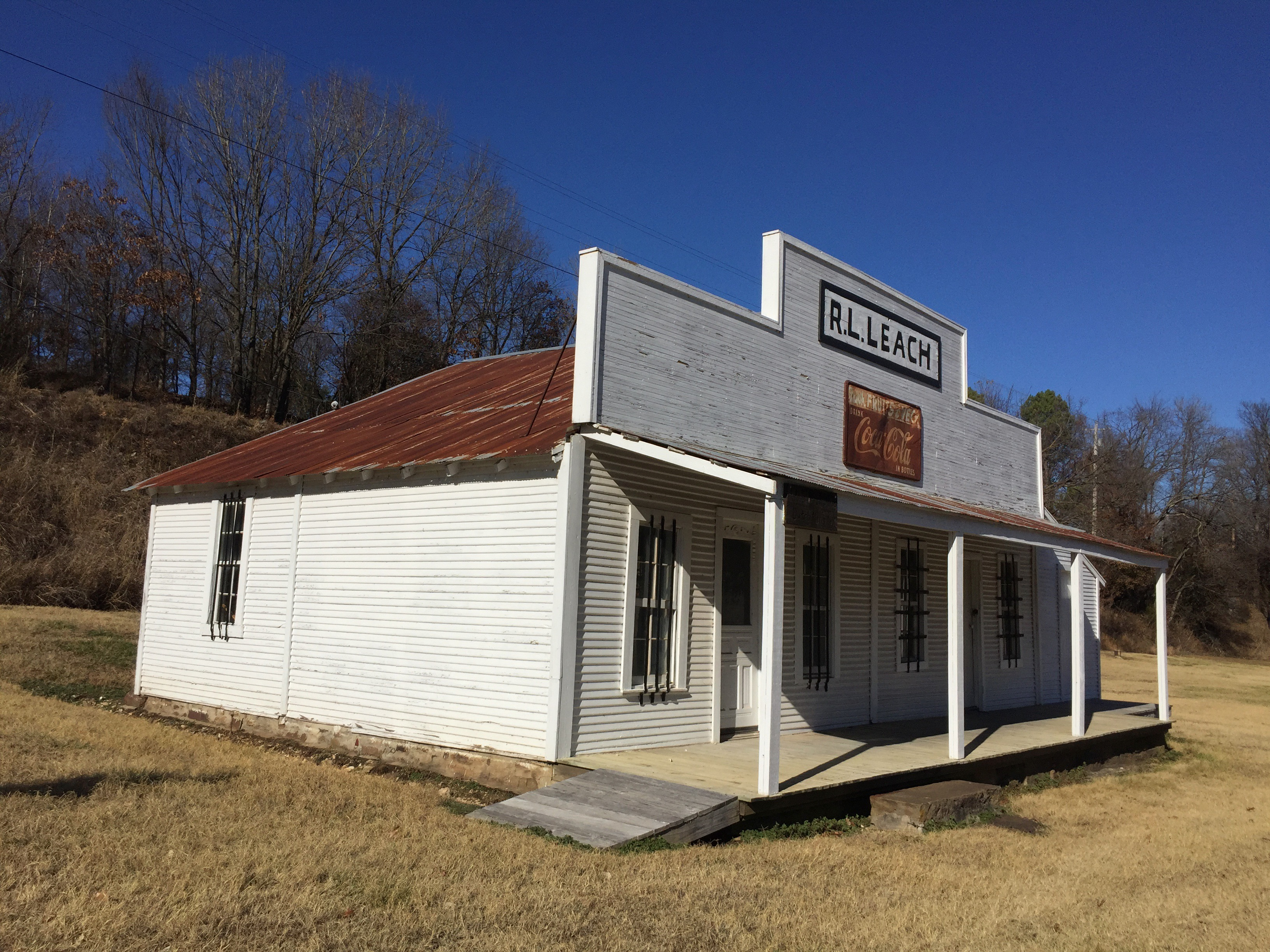

- Location within Arkansas Location within the United States
- Location: West Side of Dutch Mills Road, 175 feet from Washington Co. Road 418, Dutch Mills, Arkansas
- Coordinates: 35°52′34″N 94°29′29″W
- Area: less than one acre
- Built: c. 1925
- Architectural style: Plain/Traditional
- NRHP reference No.: 100002013
- Added to NRHP: January 26, 2018

The R.L. Leach Grocery Store is a historic commercial building on Dutch Mills Road in Dutch Mills, Arkansas. Built about 1925, it is a single-story structure with a gabled roof and exterior finished in novelty siding. A shed-roof porch extends across the front facade supported by square posts. The facade is symmetrical, with a pair of entrances, each flanked by sash windows. A parapet above the porch roof is adorned with a sign identifying the building. The building site was where the first general store and post office were located in the village of Dutch Mills, when it was first settled by German immigrants in the 1860s. The present building is in part built in 1925 as a replacement for an earlier store destroyed by fire, and in part from a nearby filling station building, which was grafted onto it. In addition to housing the community store, it also served as its post office until 1968.

The building was listed on the National Register of Historic Places in 2018.

== See also ==
- National Register of Historic Places listings in Washington County, Arkansas
