= Vernon Fitzhugh House =

Historic house in Arkansas, United States

- U.S. National Register of Historic Places
- Location within Arkansas Location within the United States
- Location: 1551 E. Hope St., Fayetteville, Arkansas
- Coordinates: 36°4′43″N 94°8′18″W
- Area: 80 acres (32 ha)
- Built: 1962
- Architectural style: Mid-Century Modern
- NRHP reference No.: 100001015
- Added to NRHP: June 5, 2017

The Vernon Fitzhugh House is a historic house at 1551 East Hope Street in Fayetteville, Arkansas. It is a T-shaped, two-story building, built of brown brick with extensive use of single-pane glass windows and French doors. The house was built in 1962 to a design by Arkansas architect Warren Segraves, and is a good example of Mid-Century Modern residential architecture, with its deep overhanging eaves, and unusual placement and size of its windows. It was built for Vernon Fitzhugh, owner of a local business services company.

The house was listed on the National Register of Historic Places in 2017.

== See also ==
- National Register of Historic Places listings in Washington County, Arkansas
