= Willis Noll House =

Historic house in Arkansas, United States

- U.S. National Register of Historic Places
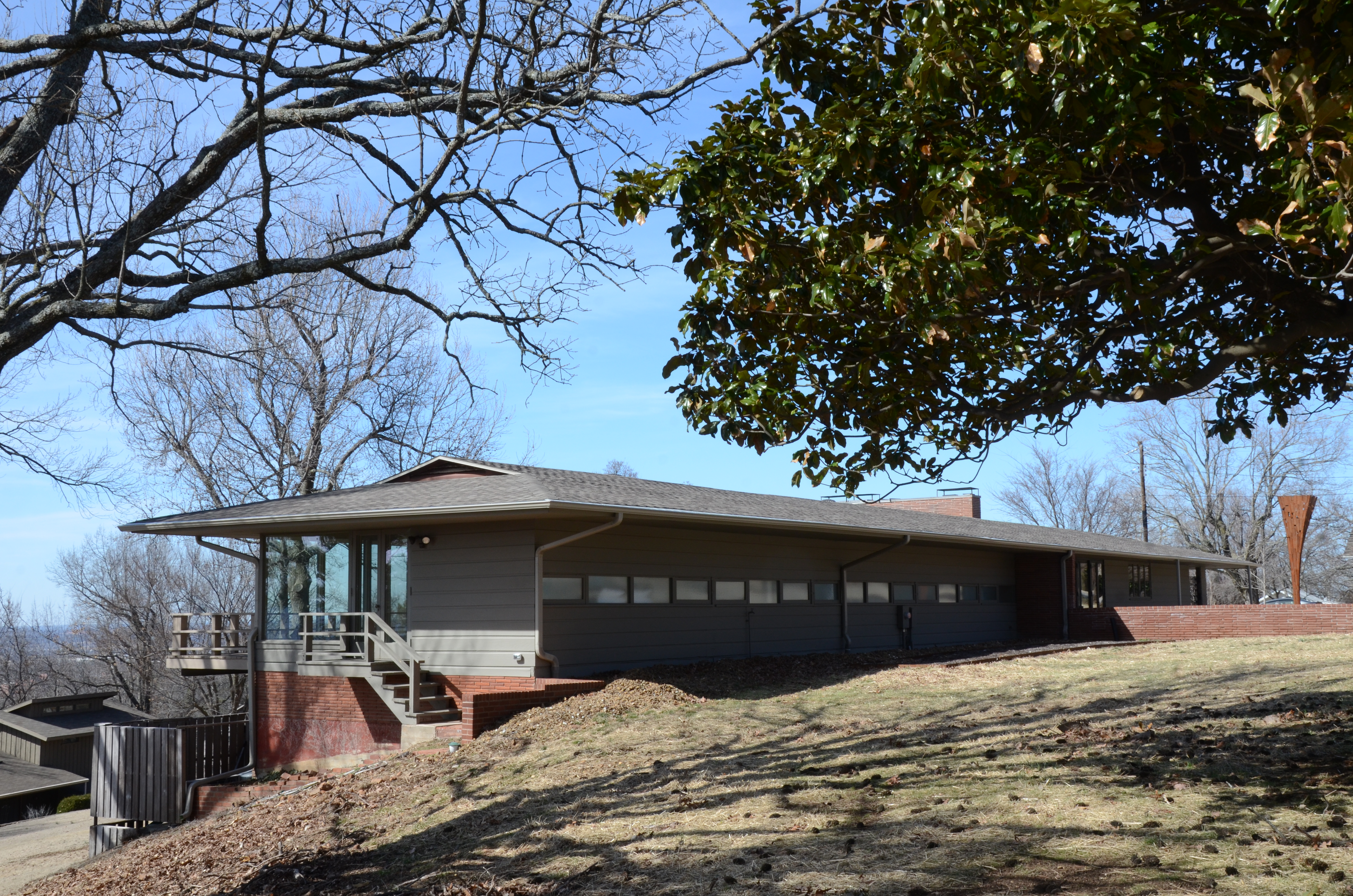

- Location within Arkansas Location within the United States
- Location: 531 N. Sequoyah Dr., Fayetteville, Arkansas
- Coordinates: 36°04′13″N 94°08′41″W
- Area: less than one acre
- Built: 1950
- Architect: Stone, Edward Durell
- Architectural style: Modern Movement
- NRHP reference No.: 04001498
- Added to NRHP: January 20, 2005

The Willis Noll House is a historic house at 531 North Sequoyah Drive in Fayetteville, Arkansas. Located on a steeply-sloping lot, it presents a single-story to the front and two to the rear. Its foundation, chimney, and part of its walls are red brick, while the rest is finished in horizontal siding. The house is a long narrow rectangle capped by a shallow-pitch gable-on-hip roof. Built in 1950, it is one of five houses in Arkansas designed by native son Edward Durell Stone and the only one in his home town. The house shows the influence of Frank Lloyd Wright on Stone's work, with the open floor plan, expansive windows, and the use of natural materials.

The house was listed on the National Register of Historic Places in 2005.

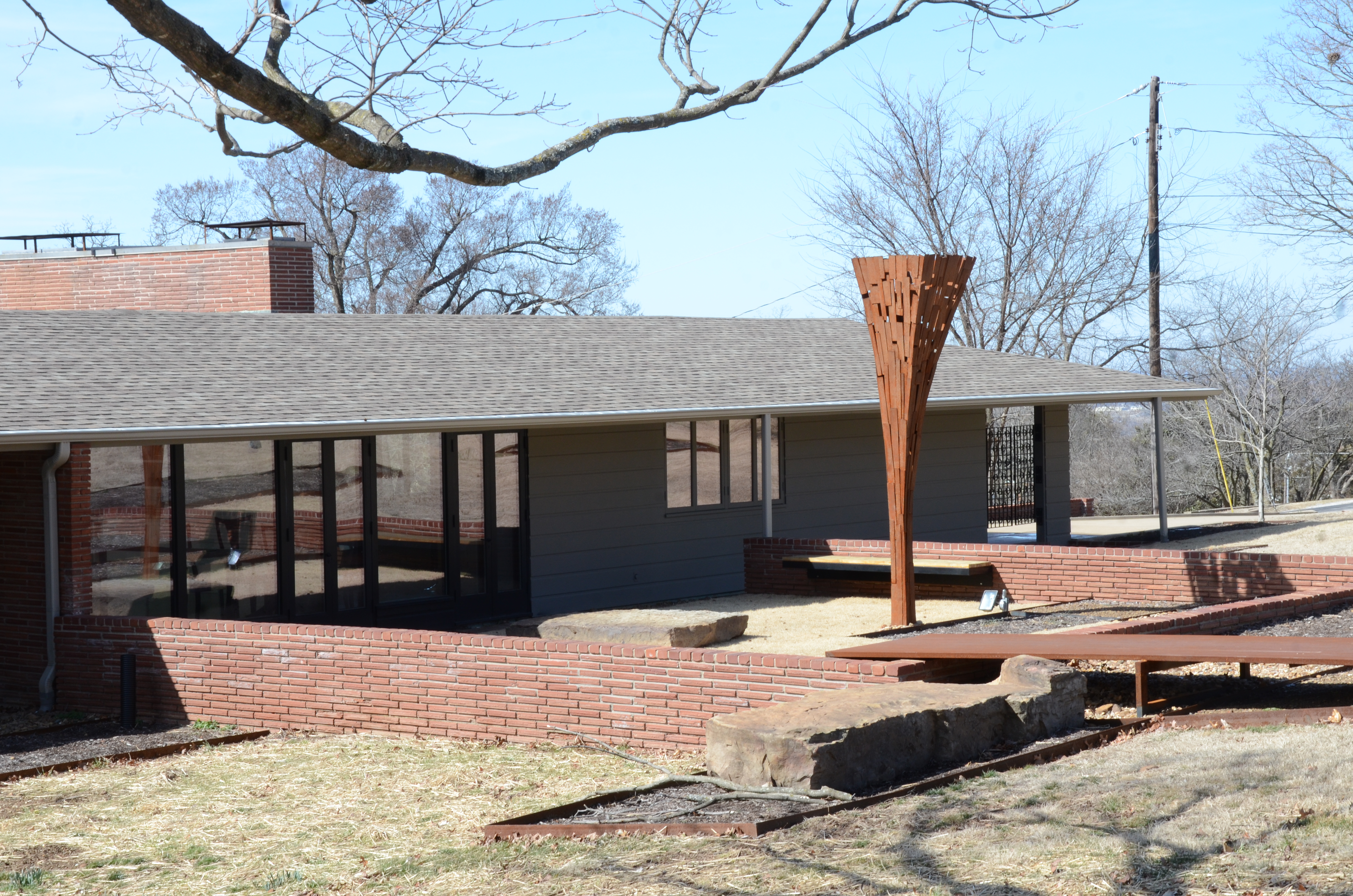
Entry detail Willis Noll House, March 2015

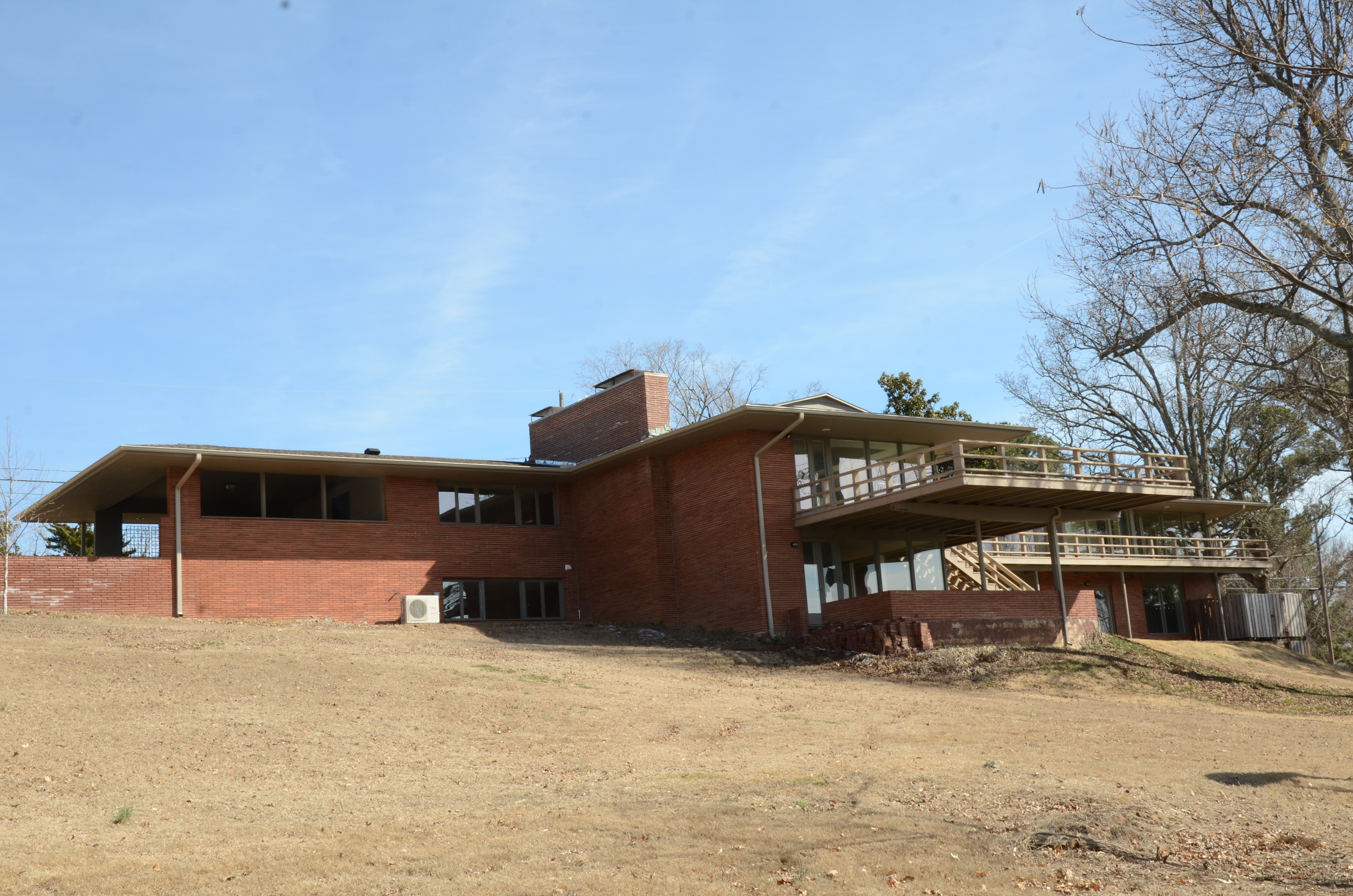
South face of Willis Noll House, March 2015

== See also ==
- National Register of Historic Places listings in Washington County, Arkansas
