= Wade-Heerwagen House =

Historic house in Arkansas, United States

- U.S. National Register of Historic Places
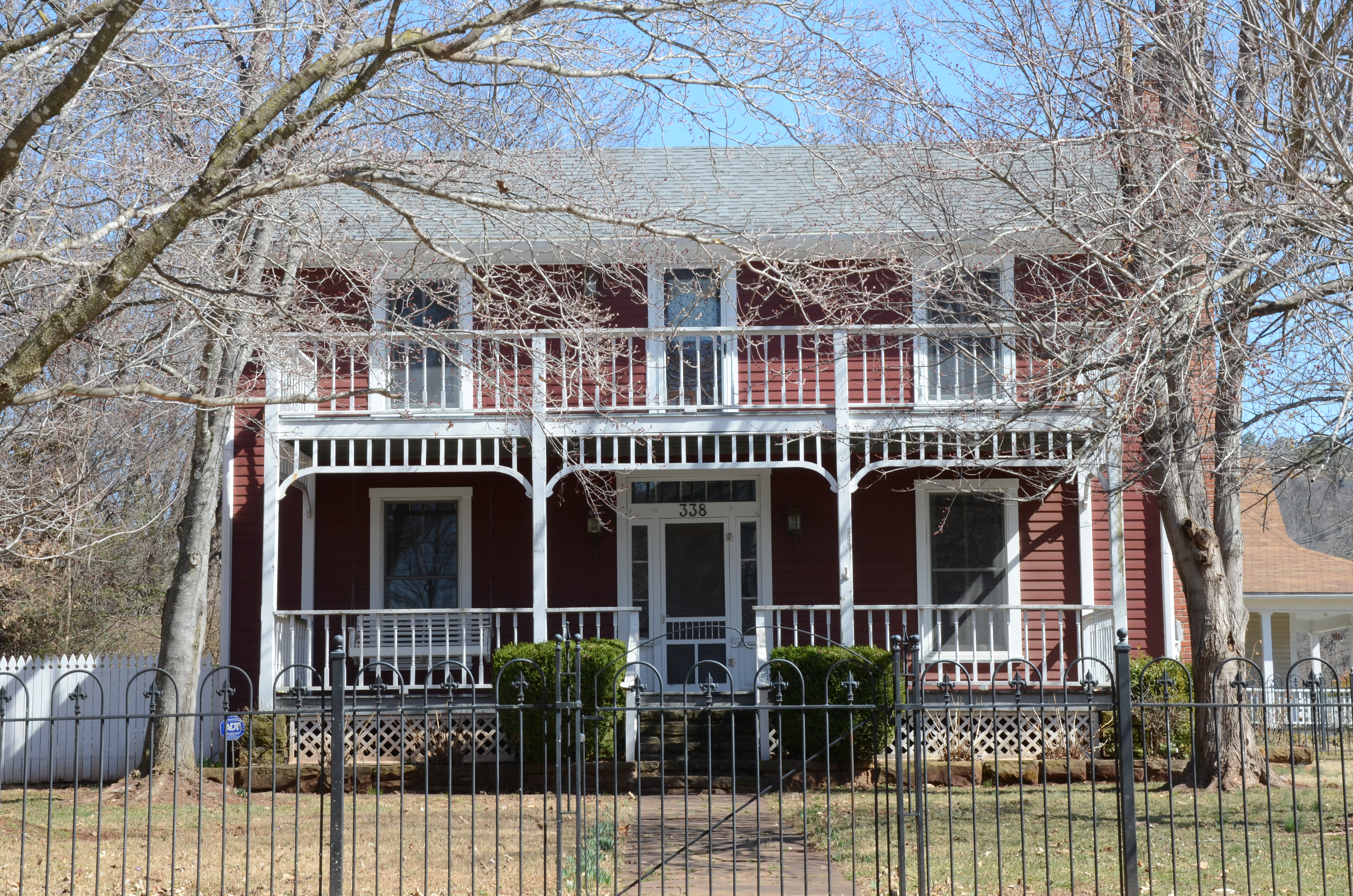

- Location within Arkansas Location within the United States
- Location: 338 Washington Ave., N, Fayetteville, Arkansas
- Coordinates: 36°4′3″N 94°9′20″W
- Area: less than one acre
- Built: 1873
- Architectural style: Eighteenth-century Virginia
- NRHP reference No.: 78000637
- Added to NRHP: June 15, 1978

The Wade-Heerwagen House is a historic house at 338 North Washington Avenue. in Fayetteville, Arkansas. It is a two-story wood-frame structure, built in the 1870s in imitation of pre-Civil War houses more typical of late-18th century Virginia. The house is T-shaped, with a front section three bays wide that has a two-story porch extending across its width, and a rear ell added after the house's initial construction. Its interior includes the first bathtub installed in Fayetteville.

The house was listed on the National Register of Historic Places in 1978.

== See also ==
- National Register of Historic Places listings in Washington County, Arkansas
