= Wiley P. McNair House =

Historic house in Arkansas, United States

- U.S. National Register of Historic Places
- Location within Arkansas Location within the United States
- Location: 301 Mountain Street, Fayetteville, Arkansas
- Coordinates: 36°3′43″N 94°9′48″W
- Area: less than one acre
- Built: 1888
- Architectural style: Vernacular Queen Anne Victorian
- NRHP reference No.: 16000654
- Added to NRHP: September 20, 2016

The Wiley P. McNair House is a historic house located in Fayetteville, Arkansas.

== Description and history ==
It is a 2 1/2-story timber-framed structure, with a side gable roof and two projecting front gables. The left gable is atop a two-story projecting section, and there is a single-story shed-roof porch extending to the right. It was built about 1888 for a railroad agent, on land that was originally part of the Fayetteville Female Seminary campus.

The house was listed on the National Register of Historic Places on September 20, 2016.

== See also ==
- National Register of Historic Places listings in Washington County, Arkansas
