= Ellis Building =

- U.S. National Register of Historic Places
- Location within Arkansas Location within the United States
- Location: 208 N. Block Ave., Fayetteville, Arkansas
- Coordinates: 36°3′54″N 94°9′38″W
- Area: less than one acre
- Built: c. 1923
- NRHP reference No.: 100003982
- Added to NRHP: May 28, 2019

The Ellis Building is a historic commercial building at 208 North Block Avenue in Fayetteville, Arkansas. It is a single-story brick building, with a hip roof that has a rounded top section. The roof's shape is obscured from the front by a low stepped parapet. The front facade has a former garage bay opening to the left, and a pair of plate glass display windows flanking a pedestrian entrance to the right. The building was under construction about 1923, and is one of the oldest surviving automotive service buildings in northwestern Arkansas. It has housed a variety of commercial businesses since ending automotive use about 1955.

The building was listed on the National Register of Historic Places in 2019.

== See also ==
- National Register of Historic Places listings in Washington County, Arkansas
