= Dr. James Patrick House =

Historic house in Arkansas, United States

- U.S. National Register of Historic Places
- Location within Arkansas Location within the United States
- Location: 370 N. Williams Dr., Fayetteville, Arkansas
- Coordinates: 36°4′4″N 94°8′35″W
- Area: less than one acre
- Built: 1965
- Architect: Jacks, Ernie
- Architectural style: Modern Movement
- NRHP reference No.: 100000592
- Added to NRHP: January 31, 2017

The Dr. James Patrick House is a historic house at 370 North Williams Drive in Fayetteville, Arkansas. Set on a steeply pitched lot on Mount Sequoyah, it is a basically linear single-story structure sited well away from the road to maximize its eastward view. It has a low-pitch roof and is finished in glass and brick. It is functionally divided by a carport near its center, with public rooms on one side and private ones the other. It was built in 1965–66 to a design by Ernie Jacks, who had previously worked with Edward Durell Stone. It is a distinctive local example of Mid-Century Modern architecture, in a neighborhood principally populated with more conventional vernacular buildings of the period.

The house was listed on the National Register of Historic Places in 2017.

== See also ==
- National Register of Historic Places listings in Washington County, Arkansas
