= House at 712 N. Mill Street =

Historic house in Arkansas, United States

- U.S. National Register of Historic Places
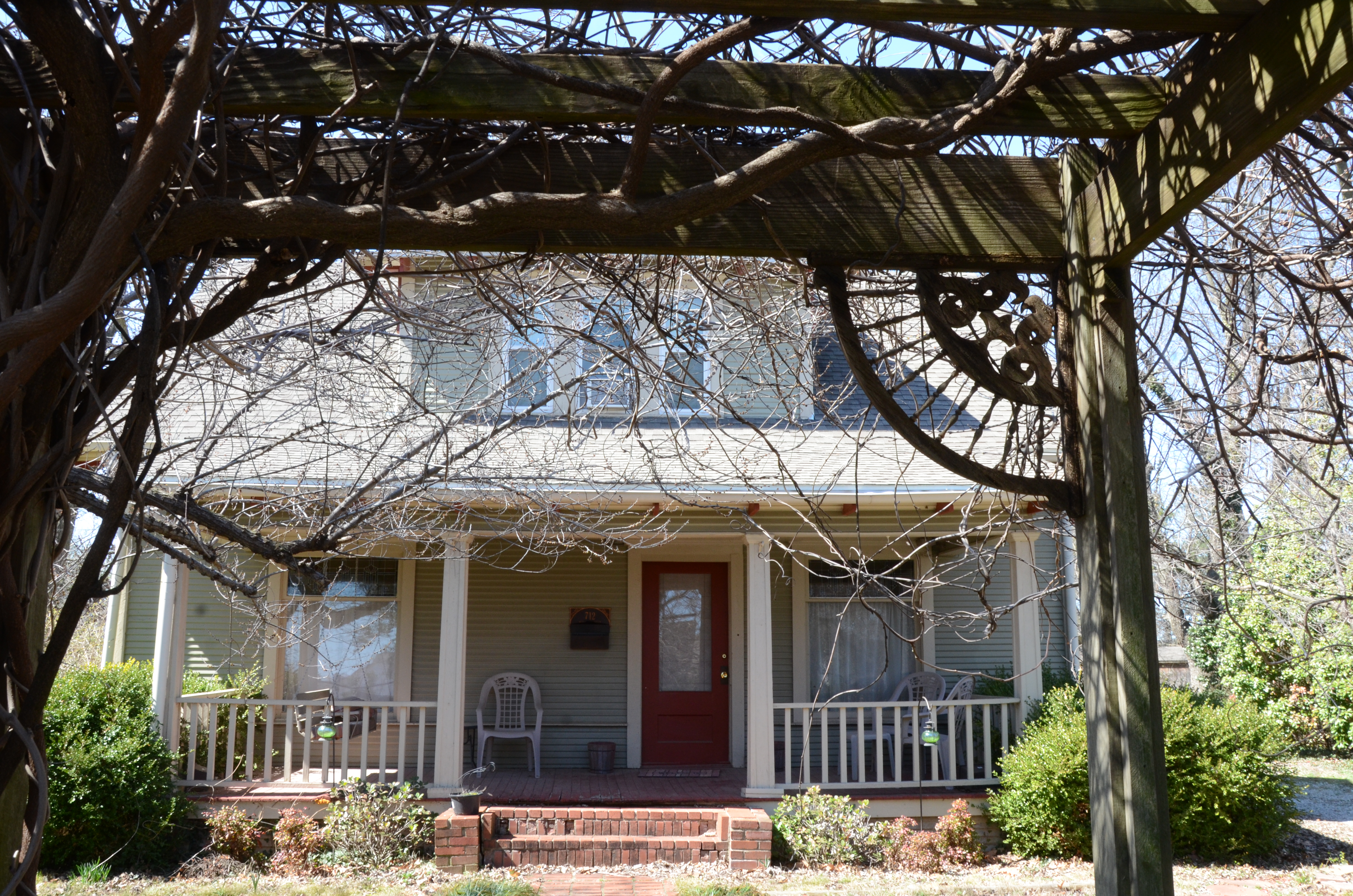

- Location within Arkansas Location within the United States
- Location: 712 N. Mill St., Springdale, Arkansas
- Coordinates: 36°11′32″N 94°7′48″W
- Area: less than one acre
- Built: 1914
- Architectural style: Bungalow/craftsman
- NRHP reference No.: 92001157
- Added to NRHP: September 4, 1992

The House at 712 N. Mill Street in Fayetteville, Arkansas, is a particularly fine local example of Craftsman/Bungalow style architecture. Built c. 1914, it is a 1 1/2-story wood-frame structure, set on a foundation of rusticated concrete blocks. The walls are finished in novelty siding, and there is a shed-roof porch extending across most of its front, supported by slightly tapered box columns mounted on concrete piers. The area under the porch includes exposed rafter ends. A gable-roof dormer with three sash windows pierces the roof above the porch.

The house was listed on the National Register of Historic Places in 1992.

== See also ==
- National Register of Historic Places listings in Washington County, Arkansas
