= Waterman-Archer House =

Historic house in Arkansas, United States

- U.S. National Register of Historic Places
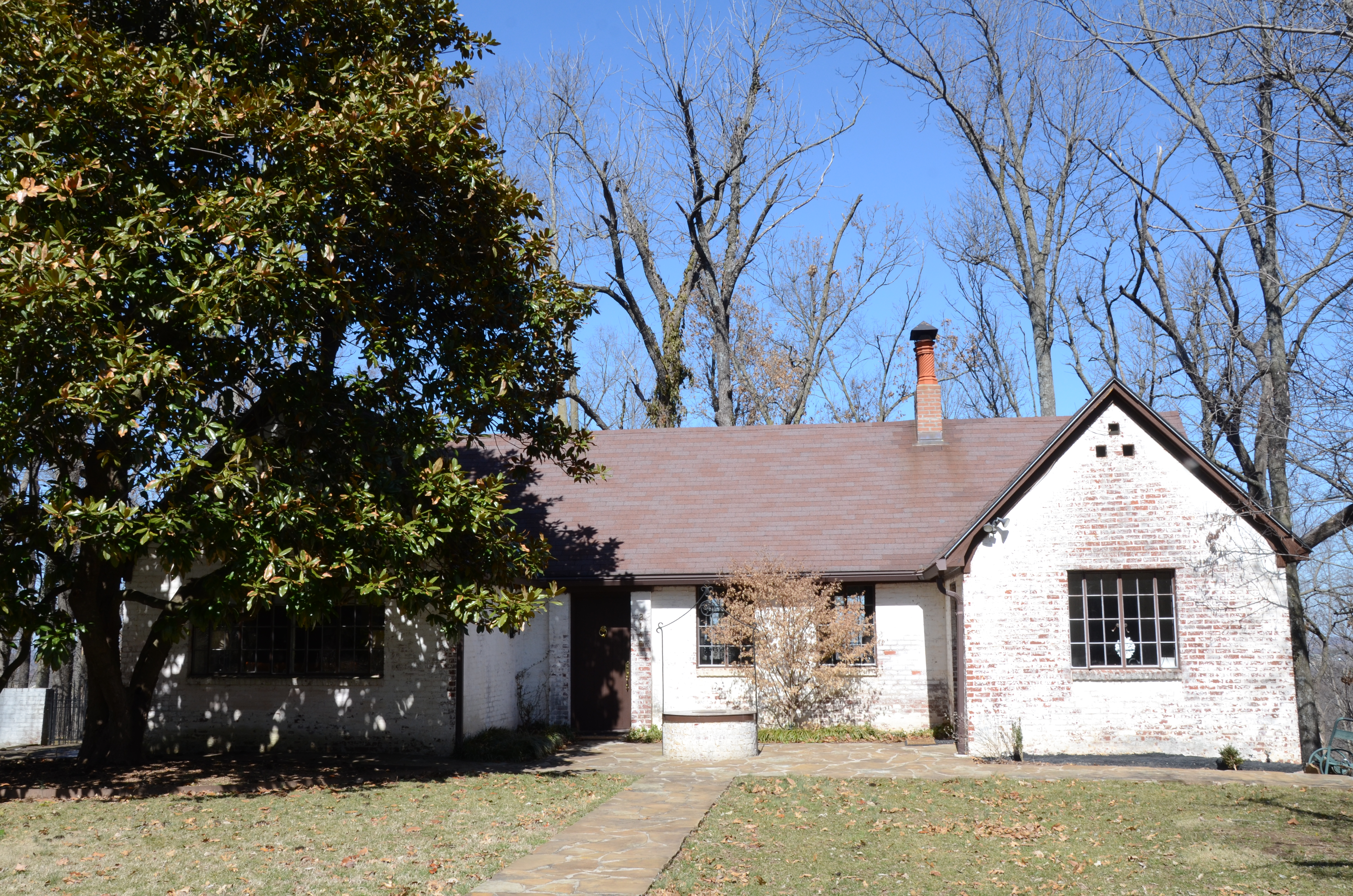

- Location within Arkansas Location within the United States
- Location: 2148 Markham, Fayetteville, Arkansas
- Coordinates: 36°4′10″N 94°11′21″W
- Area: 1.1 acres (0.45 ha)
- Built: 1929
- Architectural style: Tudor Revival
- NRHP reference No.: 99000730
- Added to NRHP: June 25, 1999

The Waterman-Archer House is a historic house at 2148 Markham in Fayetteville, Arkansas. It is a single-story Tudor Revival brick structure, whose shape is that of an H missing an arm (to the rear). To the front, it presents two gable-ended projecting sections, joined by a central portion with its roof ridge running parallel to the street. The right gable section has a large multipane window, with a trio of decorative square elements at the gable peak. The entry is found at the left side of the center section, with a window beside. Another large multipane window adorns the left gable section. The house was built in 1929, and is a distinctive local example of Tudor Revival architecture.

The house was listed on the National Register of Historic Places in 1999.

== See also ==
- National Register of Historic Places listings in Washington County, Arkansas
