= John S. Vest House =

Historic house in Arkansas, United States

- U.S. National Register of Historic Places
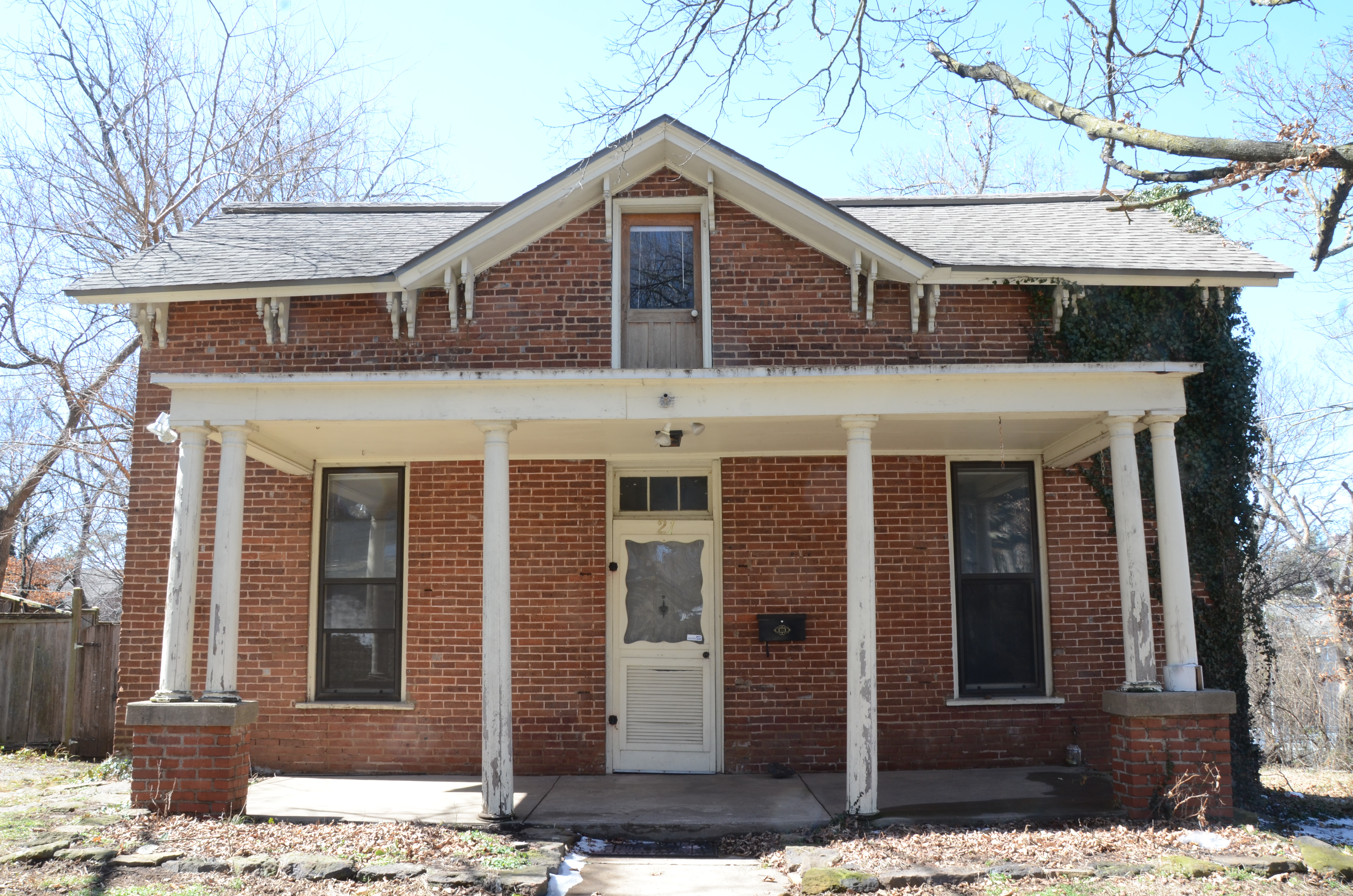

- Location within Arkansas Location within the United States
- Location: 21 N. West St., Fayetteville, Arkansas
- Coordinates: 36°3′48″N 94°9′56″W
- Area: less than one acre
- Built: 1870
- Architect: John S. Vest
- Architectural style: Gothic, Italianate
- NRHP reference No.: 79003103
- Added to NRHP: November 27, 1979

The John S. Vest House is a historic house at 21 North West Street in Fayetteville, Arkansas. It is a two-story brick structure with modest vernacular Italianate and Gothic Revival details, built in 1870 by John S. Vest, a transplanted New Yorker who owned a brickmaking operation. It has a side-gable roof with a front-facing centered cross gable, with an extended eave that has paired Italianate brackets. A single-story porch extends across most of the front supported by Doric columns, some of which are mounted on brick piers.

The house was listed on the National Register of Historic Places in 1979.

== See also ==
- National Register of Historic Places listings in Washington County, Arkansas
