= Clack House =

Historic house in Arkansas, United States

- U.S. National Register of Historic Places
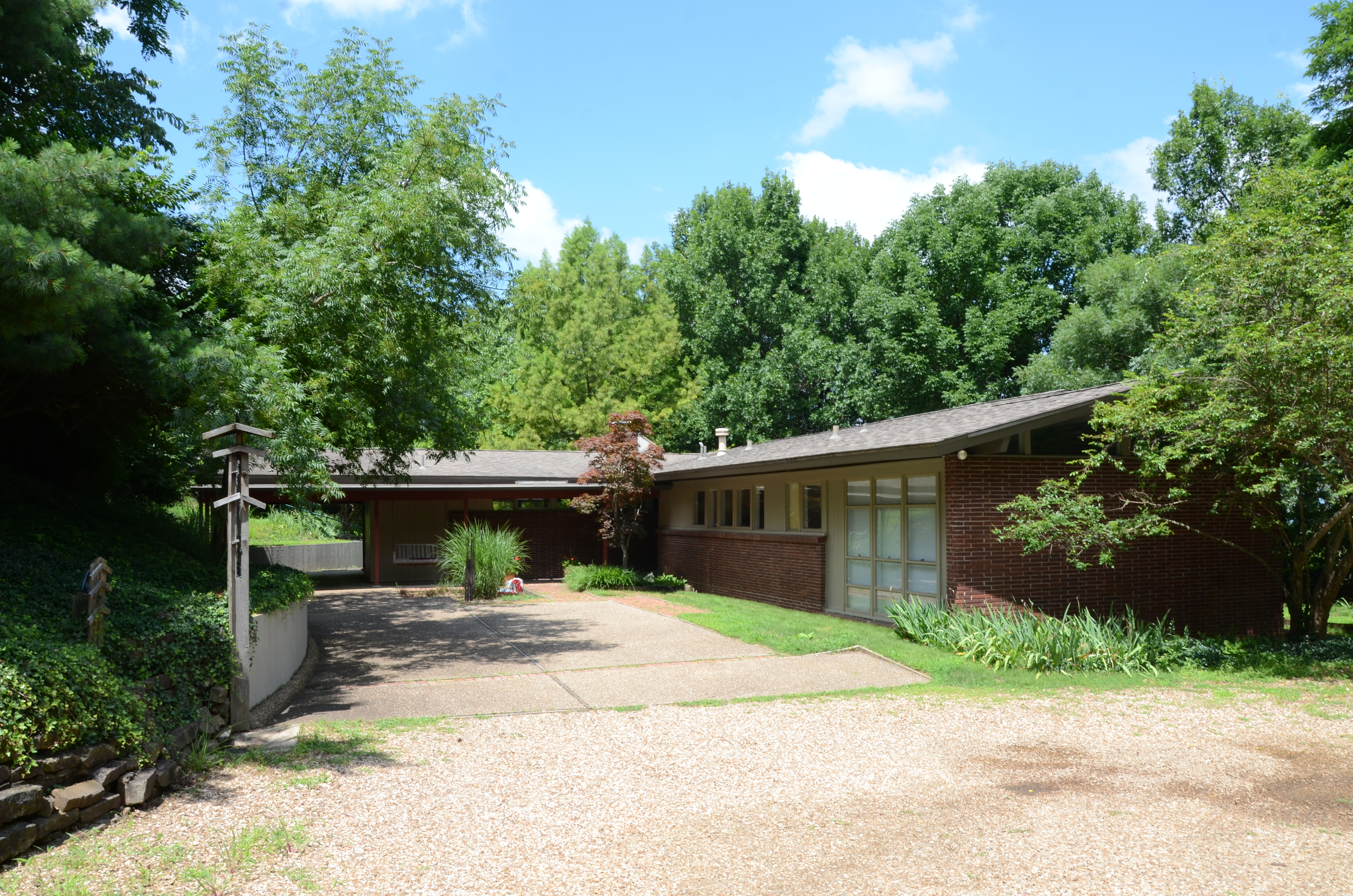

- Location within Arkansas Location within the United States
- Location: 725 E. Dogwood Ln., Fayetteville, Arkansas
- Coordinates: 36°4′9″N 94°8′54″W
- Area: less than one acre
- Built: 1954
- Architect: John G. Williams
- Architectural style: Prairie School
- NRHP reference No.: 06000077
- Added to NRHP: March 2, 2006

The Clack House is a historic house at 725 East Dogwood Lane in Fayetteville, Arkansas. The Prairie School house was designed by John G. Williams, then a professor of architecture at the University of Arkansas at Fayetteville and founder of its architecture department, and was built in 1954–56. The house was designed for the Clacks with energy efficiency in mind, using hollow cavity masonry walls, while providing expansive views of the city from many windows.

The house was listed on the National Register of Historic Places in 2006.

== See also ==
- National Register of Historic Places listings in Washington County, Arkansas
