= Peter Smyth House =

Historic house in Arkansas, United States

- U.S. National Register of Historic Places
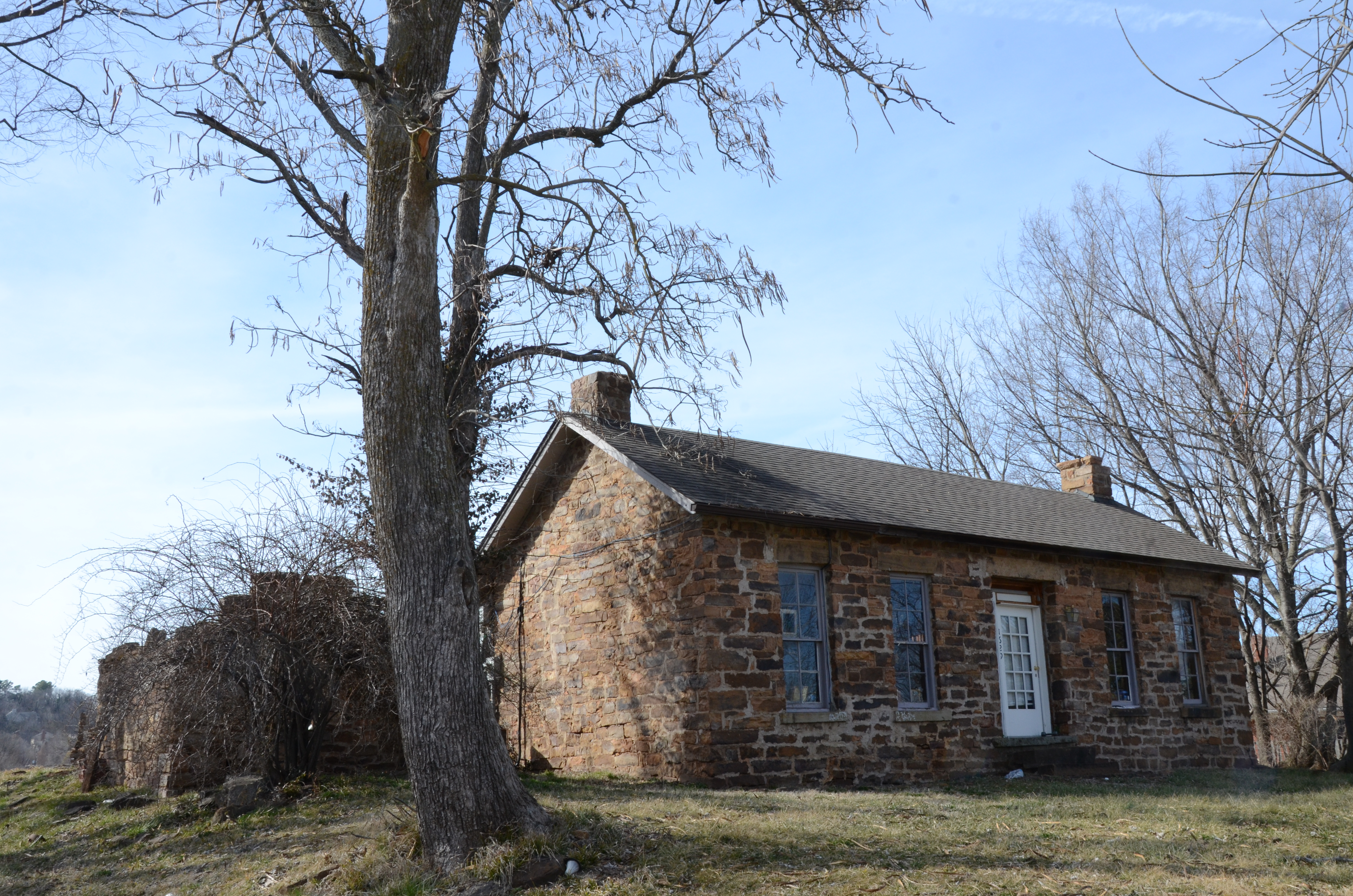

- Location within Arkansas Location within the United States
- Location: 1629 Crossover St., Fayetteville, Arkansas
- Coordinates: 36°4′56″N 94°7′17″W
- Area: 2 acres (0.81 ha)
- Built: 1886
- Architectural style: Greek Revival
- NRHP reference No.: 02001080
- Added to NRHP: October 4, 2002

The Peter Smyth House is a historic house at 1629 Crossover Street in Fayetteville, Arkansas. Built in 1886, it is a regionally rare example of a small stone cottage built in a traditional central hall plan. The house is built out of coursed sandstone, and has finely-chiseled lintels and sills for the openings. The front facade is five bays wide, with a center entry flanked by four sash windows. There two chimneys just inside the outer side walls at the peak of the side gable roof. A stone ell of antiquity similar to that of the house is attached to the rear; it is uncertain whether it was built as an integral part of the house, or added later.

The house was listed on the National Register of Historic Places in 2002.

== See also ==
- National Register of Historic Places listings in Washington County, Arkansas
