= Tharp House (Fayetteville, Arkansas) =

Historic house in Arkansas, United States

- U.S. National Register of Historic Places
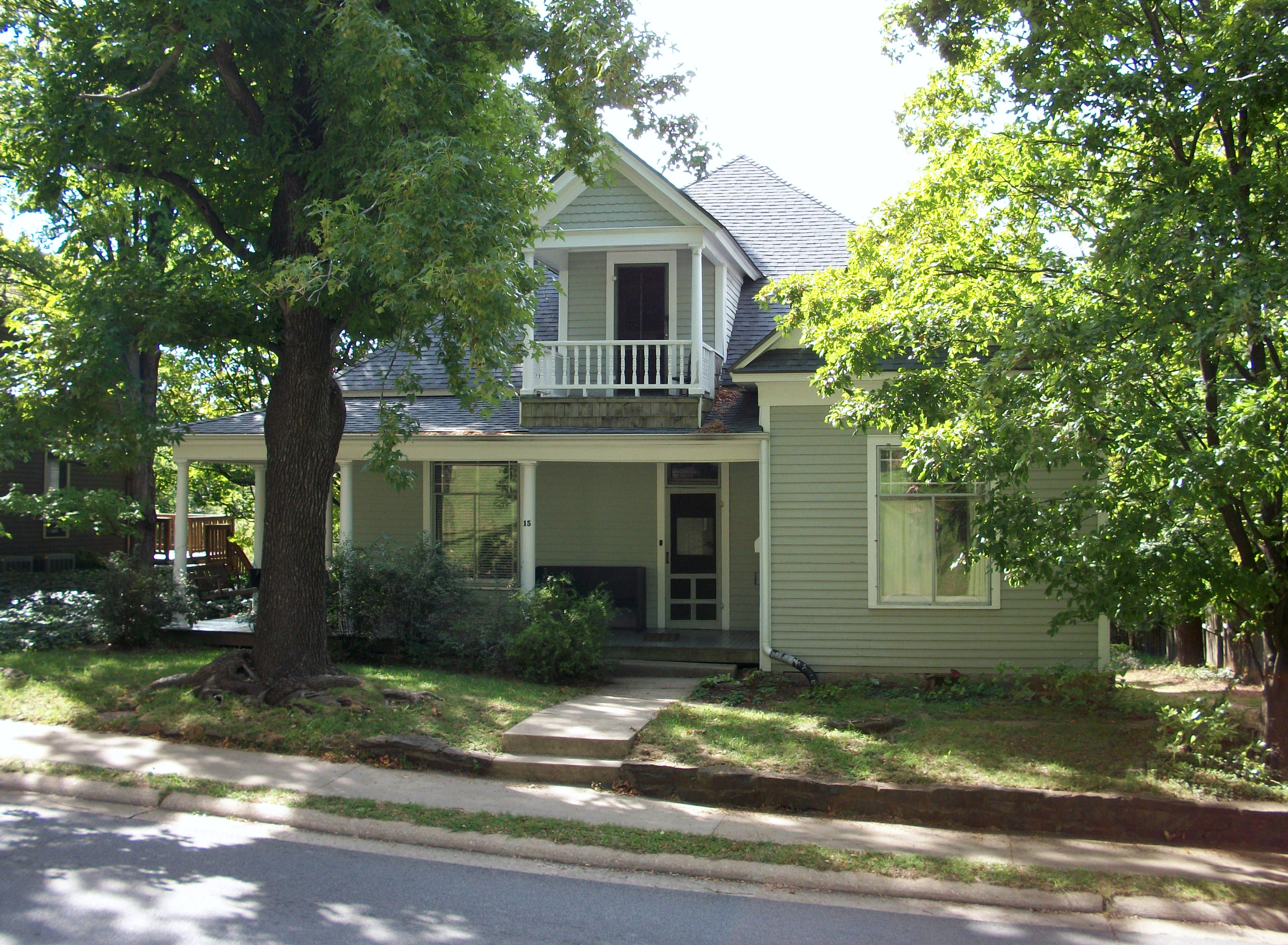

- Location within Arkansas Location within the United States
- Location: 15 North West Ave., Fayetteville, Arkansas
- Coordinates: 36°3′48″N 94°9′56″W
- Area: less than one acre
- Built: 1904
- Architectural style: Queen Anne
- NRHP reference No.: 03001461
- Added to NRHP: January 21, 2004

The Tharp House is a historic house at 15 North West Avenue in Fayetteville, Arkansas. It is a 1 1/2-story wood-frame house, with Queen Anne styling. Its front facade is three bays wide, with a projecting square gable-roofed section to the right, and the main entrance in the center, sheltered by a porch that wraps around the left side. A large gabled dormer projects from the hip roof above the entrance, large enough for a doorway and a small balcony. Built in 1904 by Moses Tharp, it is an unusual local example of late Queen Anne style.

The house was listed on the National Register of Historic Places in 2004.

== See also ==
- National Register of Historic Places listings in Washington County, Arkansas
