= National Register of Historic Places listings in Washington County, Arkansas =

List of historic sites in the USA

Location of Washington County in Arkansas

This is a list of the National Register of Historic Places listings in Washington County, Arkansas.

This is intended to be a complete list of the properties and districts on the National Register of Historic Places in Washington County, Arkansas, United States.

There are 154 properties and districts listed on the National Register in the county. Another 11 properties were once listed but have been removed.

Contents: Counties in Arkansas
- Arkansas
- Ashley
- Baxter
- Benton
- Boone
- Bradley
- Calhoun
- Carroll
- Chicot
- Clark
- Clay
- Cleburne
- Cleveland
- Columbia
- Conway
- Craighead
- Crawford
- Crittenden
- Cross
- Dallas
- Desha
- Drew
- Faulkner
- Franklin
- Fulton
- Garland
- Grant
- Greene
- Hempstead
- Hot Spring
- Howard
- Independence
- Izard
- Jackson
- Jefferson
- Johnson
- Lafayette
- Lawrence
- Lee
- Lincoln
- Little River
- Logan
- Lonoke
- Madison
- Marion
- Miller
- Mississippi
- Monroe
- Montgomery
- Nevada
- Newton
- Ouachita
- Perry
- Phillips
- Pike
- Poinsett
- Polk
- Pope
- Prairie
- Pulaski (Little Rock)
- Randolph
- St. Francis
- Saline
- Scott
- Searcy
- Sebastian
- Sevier
- Sharp
- Stone
- Union
- Van Buren
- Washington
- White
- Woodruff
- Yell

This National Park Service list is complete through NPS recent listings posted September 11, 2026.

== Current listings ==
	Name on the Register	Image	Date listed	Location	City or town	Description
1	Agriculture Building-University of Arkansas, Fayetteville	Agriculture Building-University of Arkansas, Fayetteville	September 4, 1992 (#92001098)	Campus Dr. 36°04′09″N 94°10′22″W	Fayetteville	No longer standing as of July 2026.
2	Anderson-Taylor House		September 14, 2021 (#100006933)	1599 West Halsell Rd. 36°04′07″N 94°10′57″W	Fayetteville	
3	John and Elisabeth Anderson House		July 26, 2023 (#100008569)	1611 West Halsell Rd. 36°04′07″N 94°10′59″W	Fayetteville	
4	Bean Cemetery	Bean Cemetery	March 7, 1994 (#94000152)	Northern side of U.S. Highway 62, about 2.2 miles (3.5 km) west of its junction with Highway 45; 35°56′56″N 94°25′01″W	Lincoln	
5	Beely-Johnson American Legion Post 139	Beely-Johnson American Legion Post 139	May 30, 2007 (#07000474)	200 N. Spring St. 36°11′11″N 94°07′47″W	Springdale	
6	Bethlehem Cemetery	Bethlehem Cemetery	November 15, 2000 (#00001365)	Approximately 4 miles (6.4 km) southwest of Cane Hill on Highway 45, near its junction with County Road 442; 35°52′21″N 94°27′31″W	Canehill	
7	Black Oak Cemetery	Black Oak Cemetery	June 3, 1998 (#98000619)	Off AR 265, 4 miles (6.4 km) southwest of Greenland; 35°58′48″N 94°13′44″W	Greenland	A part of the ghost town of Black Oak
8	Blackburn House	Blackburn House	November 17, 1982 (#82000940)	Main at College Sts. 35°54′37″N 94°23′46″W	Canehill	
9	Borden House	Borden House	March 17, 1977 (#77000278)	Northeast of Prairie Grove on U.S. Highway 62; 35°58′33″N 94°18′10″W	Prairie Grove	
10	Brown Bluff (3WA10)		June 24, 1987 (#86002946)	Address Restricted	Woolsey	
11	Business Administration Building-University of Arkansas, Fayetteville	Business Administration Building-University of Arkansas, Fayetteville	September 4, 1992 (#92001099)	Campus Dr. 36°04′03″N 94°10′15″W	Fayetteville	
12	Butterfield Overland Mail Route Fayetteville Segments Historic District	Butterfield Overland Mail Route Fayetteville Segments Historic District	June 18, 2009 (#09000456)	West of Highway 265 in Lake Fayetteville Park; 36°08′22″N 94°07′37″W	Fayetteville	Segment of the Butterfield Overland Mail route
13	Butterfield Overland Mail Route Segment	Butterfield Overland Mail Route Segment	June 9, 2010 (#10000347)	Bugscuffle Rd. south of Strickler and Old Cove City Rd. north of Chester; 35°47′22″N 94°20′21″W	Strickler	Segment of the Butterfield Overland Mail route; extends into Crawford County
14	Cane Hill Battlefield	Cane Hill Battlefield	March 7, 1994 (#94000132)	Area surrounding Highway 45 and County Roads 291, 8, 284, and 285; 35°51′16″N 94°22′25″W	Canehill	
15	Canehill Cemetery	Canehill Cemetery	November 17, 1982 (#82000941)	Highway 13; 35°54′50″N 94°23′55″W	Canehill	
16	Cane Hill College Building	Cane Hill College Building	November 17, 1982 (#82000942)	McClellan and College St. 35°54′39″N 94°23′51″W	Canehill	
17	Ella Carnall Hall	Ella Carnall Hall	December 22, 1982 (#82000943)	Arkansas Ave. and Maple St. 36°04′10″N 94°10′08″W	Fayetteville	
18	A.R. Carroll Building	A.R. Carroll Building	November 17, 1982 (#82000944)	Main St. 35°54′32″N 94°23′48″W	Canehill	
19	Chemistry Building-University of Arkansas, Fayetteville	Chemistry Building-University of Arkansas, Fayetteville	September 4, 1992 (#92001100)	Campus Dr. 36°04′04″N 94°10′22″W	Fayetteville	
20	Chi Omega Chapter House	Chi Omega Chapter House	April 20, 1995 (#95000456)	940 Maple St. 36°04′13″N 94°10′24″W	Fayetteville	
21	Chi Omega Greek Theatre-University of Arkansas, Fayetteville	Chi Omega Greek Theatre-University of Arkansas, Fayetteville	September 4, 1992 (#92001101)	Dickson St. 36°04′01″N 94°10′25″W	Fayetteville	
22	Clack House	Clack House	March 2, 2006 (#06000077)	725 E. Dogwood Ln. 36°04′09″N 94°08′54″W	Fayetteville	
23	Joe Marsh and Maxine Clark House		February 3, 2020 (#100004945)	1724 Rockwood Trail; 36°04′23″N 94°08′11″W	Fayetteville	
24	Clinton House	Clinton House	January 21, 2010 (#09000800)	930 West Clinton Drive (formerly California Blvd.); 36°03′49″N 94°10′25″W	Fayetteville	
25	Nathan Combs House		December 12, 1976 (#76000472)	Address Restricted	Fayetteville	
26	County Road 6 Bridge	County Road 6 Bridge	September 24, 2004 (#04001043)	On County Road 6, approximately 0.5 miles (0.80 km) south of its junction with County Road 820; 36°04′15″N 94°28′30″W	Cincinnati	
27	Deepwood House		May 21, 2018 (#100002459)	4697 W Finger Rd. 36°02′10″N 94°12′43″W	Fayetteville	
28	Devil's Den State Park Historic District	Devil's Den State Park Historic District	July 24, 1994 (#92000071)	Highway 74 west of Winslow; 35°46′44″N 94°15′12″W	Winslow	
29	David and Mary Margaret Durst House	David and Mary Margaret Durst House	May 28, 2015 (#15000288)	857 Fairview Dr. 36°03′51″N 94°10′22″W	Fayetteville	
30	Earle House	Earle House	November 17, 1982 (#82000945)	Highway 45; 35°54′18″N 94°23′45″W	Canehill	
31	D.N. Edmiston House	D.N. Edmiston House	November 17, 1982 (#82000946)	Main St. 35°54′39″N 94°23′45″W	Canehill	
32	John Edmiston House	John Edmiston House	November 17, 1982 (#82000947)	Off Highway 45; 35°54′49″N 94°23′46″W	Canehill	
33	Zeb Edmiston House	Zeb Edmiston House	November 17, 1982 (#82000948)	Main St. 35°54′30″N 94°23′45″W	Canehill	
34	Ellis Building		May 28, 2019 (#100003982)	208 N. Block Ave. 36°03′54″N 94°09′38″W	Fayetteville	
35	Elm Springs Cemetery, Historic Section		November 5, 2020 (#100005759)	Northeast of the east end of School St. on Lawn View Ln. 36°12′20″N 94°13′50″W	Elm Springs	
36	Evansville-Dutch Mills Road Bridge	Evansville-Dutch Mills Road Bridge	January 24, 2008 (#07001436)	County Road 464; 35°51′55″N 94°29′59″W	Dutch Mills	
37	Evergreen Cemetery	Evergreen Cemetery	October 30, 1997 (#97001279)	Junction of University and William Sts. 36°03′51″N 94°10′09″W	Fayetteville	
38	Fayetteville Confederate Cemetery	Fayetteville Confederate Cemetery	June 3, 1993 (#93000481)	Rock St., approximately 800 feet north of its junction with Willow St. 36°03′40″N 94°09′08″W	Fayetteville	
39	Fayetteville Fire Department Fire Station 1	Fayetteville Fire Department Fire Station 1	June 2, 2015 (#15000289)	303 W. Center; 36°03′45″N 94°09′48″W	Fayetteville	
40	Fayetteville Fire Department Fire Station 3	Fayetteville Fire Department Fire Station 3	June 2, 2015 (#15000290)	4140 S. School St. 36°00′35″N 94°10′23″W	Fayetteville	
41	Fayetteville National Cemetery	Fayetteville National Cemetery	July 28, 1999 (#99000892)	700 Government Ave. 36°03′09″N 94°10′04″W	Fayetteville	
42	Fayetteville Veterans Administration Hospital	Fayetteville Veterans Administration Hospital	February 15, 2012 (#12000024)	1100 N. College Ave. 36°04′50″N 94°09′35″W	Fayetteville	
43	Fishback School	Fishback School	September 4, 1992 (#92001120)	Butterfield Coach Road; 36°10′12″N 94°05′41″W	Springdale	
44	Fitzgerald Station and Farmstead	Fitzgerald Station and Farmstead	May 29, 2003 (#03000465)	2327 Old Wire Rd. and 1567 Dodd Ave. 36°12′19″N 94°06′49″W	Springdale	c. 1870 Greek Revival house and outbuildings associated with Butterfield Overland Mail Company
45	Vernon Fitzhugh House		June 5, 2017 (#100001015)	1551 E. Hope St. 36°04′43″N 94°08′18″W	Fayetteville	
46	Frisco Depot	Frisco Depot	December 8, 1988 (#88002819)	550 W. Dickson St. 36°04′00″N 94°09′17″W	Fayetteville	
47	Goff Farm Stone Bridge	Goff Farm Stone Bridge	January 21, 2010 (#09001262)	Goff Farm Rd. approximately 0.5 miles (0.80 km) east of Dead Horse Mountain Rd. 36°02′38″N 94°06′35″W	Fayetteville	
48	Troy Gordon House	Troy Gordon House	December 1, 1978 (#78000635)	9 E. Township Rd. 36°05′40″N 94°10′11″W	Fayetteville	
49	Gregg House	Gregg House	September 17, 1974 (#74000502)	339 N. Gregg St. 36°04′04″N 94°10′01″W	Fayetteville	
50	Guisinger Building	Guisinger Building	September 20, 1984 (#84000910)	E. Mountain St. 36°03′41″N 94°09′34″W	Fayetteville	
51	Hantz House	Hantz House	November 19, 2001 (#01001233)	855 Fairview Dr. 36°03′51″N 94°10′21″W	Fayetteville	
52	Happy Hollow Farm	Happy Hollow Farm	August 6, 1986 (#86002241)	2099 Aqua Crossing; 36°03′47″N 94°07′51″W	Fayetteville	
53	Headquarters House	Headquarters House	June 24, 1971 (#71000129)	118 E. Dickson St. 36°03′58″N 94°09′04″W	Fayetteville	
54	Hemingway House and Barn	Hemingway House and Barn	August 12, 1982 (#82002148)	3310 Old Missouri Rd. 36°06′42″N 94°07′54″W	Fayetteville	
55	Highway B-29 Bridge	Highway B-29 Bridge	September 24, 2008 (#08000945)	County Road 623 over the Illinois River; 35°59′42″N 94°17′54″W	Prairie Grove	
56	Hindman Hall Museum	Hindman Hall Museum	September 15, 2020 (#100005593)	14262 West US 62; 35°58′06″N 94°20′26″W	Prairie Grove	
57	Home Economics Building-University of Arkansas, Fayetteville	Home Economics Building-University of Arkansas, Fayetteville	September 4, 1992 (#92001102)	West of Campus Dr. 36°04′09″N 94°10′25″W	Fayetteville	
58	House at 712 N. Mill Street	House at 712 N. Mill Street	September 4, 1992 (#92001157)	712 N. Mill St. 36°11′32″N 94°07′48″W	Springdale	
59	Illinois River Bridge at Phillips Ford	Illinois River Bridge at Phillips Ford	January 22, 2009 (#08001344)	County Road 848 over the Illinois River; 36°08′06″N 94°21′29″W	Savoy	
60	Jackson House	Jackson House	August 17, 1982 (#82002149)	1617 North Jordan Lane; 36°04′57″N 94°08′34″W	Fayetteville	
61	Johnson Barn	Johnson Barn	June 21, 1990 (#90000896)	Cato Springs Rd. north of Round Top Mtn. 36°00′55″N 94°12′21″W	Fayetteville	
62	Johnson House and Mill	Johnson House and Mill	December 12, 1976 (#76000473)	West of Johnson on Johnson Rd. 36°08′14″N 94°10′41″W	Johnson	
63	Johnson Switch Building	Johnson Switch Building	February 26, 1999 (#99000251)	3201 Main St. 36°08′01″N 94°10′00″W	Johnson	
64	Benjamin Franklin Johnson II Homestead District		May 29, 2019 (#100003989)	3150 W. Pear Ln. 36°00′47″N 94°12′27″W	Fayetteville	
65	E. Fay and Gus Jones House	E. Fay and Gus Jones House	April 28, 2000 (#97000453)	1330 N. Hillcrest; 36°04′51″N 94°09′10″W	Fayetteville	
66	Lafayette Street Overpass	Lafayette Street Overpass	May 26, 1995 (#95000653)	Lafayette St. over the St. Louis – San Francisco railroad tracks 36°04′06″N 94°09′57″W	Fayetteville	
67	Lake Wedington Historic District	Lake Wedington Historic District	September 11, 1995 (#94001612)	Junction of Highway 16 and Forest Service Rd. 1750 in the Ozark-St. Francis National Forest; 36°05′23″N 94°22′15″W	Savoy	
68	Lake-Bell House	Lake-Bell House	November 8, 1974 (#74000504)	North of Prairie Grove; 36°00′03″N 94°18′12″W	Prairie Grove	
69	R.L. Leach Grocery Store	R.L. Leach Grocery Store	January 26, 2018 (#100002013)	W side of Dutch Mills Rd., 175 ft. from Cty. Rd. 418; 35°52′34″N 94°29′29″W	Dutch Mills	
70	Lewis Brothers Building	Lewis Brothers Building	August 17, 1987 (#86003334)	1 S. Block; 36°03′44″N 94°09′34″W	Fayetteville	
71	Magnolia Company Filling Station	Magnolia Company Filling Station	November 15, 1978 (#78000636)	492 W. Lafayette St. 36°04′07″N 94°09′54″W	Fayetteville	
72	Maguire-Williams House	Maguire-Williams House	September 7, 1995 (#95001093)	19105 Highway 74; 36°01′31″N 94°00′35″W	Elkins	
73	Maple Street Overpass	Maple Street Overpass	May 26, 1995 (#95000654)	Maple St. over the St. Louis – San Francisco railroad tracks 36°04′12″N 94°10′00″W	Fayetteville	
74	Marinoni Ensemble Homes		September 15, 2026 (#100013420)	355 North College Avenue; 36°04′05″N 94°09′28″W	Fayetteville	
75	E.W. McClellan House	E.W. McClellan House	November 17, 1982 (#82000949)	Southwest of Canehill off Highway 45; 35°54′39″N 94°23′51″W	Canehill	
76	Wiley P. McNair House		September 20, 2016 (#16000654)	301 Mountain St. 36°03′43″N 94°09′48″W	Fayetteville	
77	Meadow Spring Historic District		March 25, 2019 (#100003016)	Roughly bounded by NW, School, Locust & Church Aves. between W Dickson St. & W Mountain; 36°03′49″N 94°09′47″W	Fayetteville	
78	Men's Gymnasium-University of Arkansas, Fayetteville	Men's Gymnasium-University of Arkansas, Fayetteville	September 4, 1992 (#92001103)	Garland Ave. 36°04′10″N 94°10′33″W	Fayetteville	
79	Methodist Manse	Methodist Manse	November 17, 1982 (#82000950)	Main and Spring Sts. 35°54′29″N 94°23′48″W	Canehill	
80	Mineral Springs Community Building	Mineral Springs Community Building	May 29, 1998 (#98000580)	County Road 34, east of West Fork; 35°55′37″N 94°08′06″W	West Fork	
81	Morrow Farmstead		January 13, 2021 (#100006044)	16995 Hale Mountain Rd. 35°51′41″N 94°26′08″W	Morrow	
82	Moore House	Moore House	November 17, 1982 (#82000951)	Northwest of Canehill on CR 13; 35°54′55″N 94°24′19″W	Canehill	
83	Mack Morton Barn	Mack Morton Barn	February 15, 2005 (#05000047)	11516 Appleby Rd. 36°01′15″N 94°14′42″W	Appleby	
84	Mount Nord Historic District	Mount Nord Historic District	September 16, 1982 (#82002150)	Mount Nord Ave. 36°04′10″N 94°09′38″W	Fayetteville	
85	Mount Sequoyah Cottages	Mount Sequoyah Cottages	August 6, 2012 (#12000278)	808 & 810 E. Skyline Dr. 36°03′53″N 94°08′37″W	Fayetteville	
86	Mount Sequoyah Historic District		May 16, 2022 (#100007722)	150 NW Skyline Dr. 36°03′51″N 94°08′45″W	Fayetteville	
87	Willis Noll House	Willis Noll House	January 20, 2005 (#04001498)	531 N. Sequoyah Dr. 36°04′07″N 94°26′40″W	Fayetteville	
88	North Garvin Drive Historic District		January 13, 2022 (#100007326)	15, 37, and 49 North Gavin Dr. 36°03′50″N 94°11′07″W	Fayetteville	
89	North Mock Street Historic District		June 22, 2018 (#100002566)	114 & 116 N Mock St. 35°58′34″N 94°19′02″W	Prairie Grove	
90	Old Bank of Fayetteville Building	Old Bank of Fayetteville Building	March 7, 1994 (#94000144)	100 W. Center St. 36°03′46″N 94°09′38″W	Fayetteville	
91	Old Main, University of Arkansas	Old Main, University of Arkansas	June 15, 1970 (#70000131)	Arkansas Ave. 36°04′07″N 94°10′17″W	Fayetteville	
92	Old Post Office	Old Post Office	August 27, 1974 (#74000503)	City Sq. 36°03′44″N 94°09′35″W	Fayetteville	
93	Old Springdale High School	Old Springdale High School	May 19, 1994 (#94000469)	814 W. Johnson Ave; 36°11′14″N 94°08′14″W	Springdale	
94	Old US 71, Greenland Segment	Old US 71, Greenland Segment	September 24, 2004 (#04001041)	County Road 1194 (S. Main Ave.); 35°58′54″N 94°10′29″W	Greenland	
95	William and Marion Orton House		May 5, 2025 (#100011811)	1641 West Halsell Road; 36°04′07″N 94°11′02″W	Fayetteville	
96	Parkview Apartments		February 24, 2026 (#100012581)	15, 25, & 33 West Prospect Street; 36°04′25″N 94°09′36″W	Fayetteville	
97	Dr. James Patrick House		January 31, 2017 (#100000592)	370 N. Williams Dr. 36°04′04″N 94°08′35″W	Fayetteville	
98	Prairie Grove Airlight Outdoor Telephone Booth	Prairie Grove Airlight Outdoor Telephone Booth	November 9, 2015 (#15000291)	SW. corner of E. Douglas and Parker Sts. 35°58′57″N 94°18′36″W	Prairie Grove	The first telephone booth listed on the National Register.
99	Prairie Grove Battlefield Park	Prairie Grove Battlefield Park	September 4, 1970 (#70000133)	Within a triangle formed by North Rd. on the northwest and U.S. Highway 62 on the south; also the northern side of US 62, east of Prairie Grove; also north of US 62, east of Prairie Grove; 35°59′09″N 94°18′51″W	Prairie Grove	Second and third sets of boundaries represent boundary increases of November 9, 1992 and October 27, 2005
100	Prairie Grove Cemetery Historic Section	Prairie Grove Cemetery Historic Section	January 8, 2016 (#15000292)	Bounded by Kate Smith, W. Buchanan, & Parks Sts. 35°58′34″N 94°19′08″W	Prairie Grove	
101	Prairie Grove Commercial Historic District		June 25, 2018 (#100002567)	Odd numbers 107-305 E Buchanan & 123 S Neal Sts. 35°58′33″N 94°18′56″W	Prairie Grove	
102	Presbyterian Center		January 12, 2022 (#100007324)	902 West Maple St. 36°04′13″N 94°10′21″W	Fayetteville	
103	Price Produce and Service Station	Price Produce and Service Station	September 23, 2011 (#11000694)	413, 415 & 417 E. Emma Ave. 36°11′05″N 94°07′35″W	Springdale	
104	Pyeatte Mill Site	Pyeatte Mill Site	November 17, 1982 (#82000954)	South of Canehill on Highway 45; 35°53′54″N 94°24′07″W	Canehill	
105	Henry Pyeatte House		November 17, 1982 (#82000952)	North of Canehill on Highway 45; 35°55′05″N 94°23′39″W	Canehill	
106	Rabbits Foot Lodge	Rabbits Foot Lodge	September 11, 1986 (#86002421)	3600 Silent Grove Rd. 36°12′35″N 94°09′29″W	Springdale	
107	Ridge House	Ridge House	November 2, 1972 (#72000211)	230 W. Center St. 36°03′46″N 94°09′23″W	Fayetteville	
108	Rieff's Chapel Cemetery		February 12, 2021 (#100006153)	West Pear Ln. 36°00′56″N 94°12′25″W	Fayetteville	
109	Routh-Bailey House		September 28, 1989 (#89001592)	Old Wire Rd. 3 miles (4.8 km) east of Fayetteville; 36°06′37″N 94°07′06″W	Fayetteville	
110	Warren Segraves House		June 5, 2017 (#100001016)	217 N. Oklahoma Way; 36°03′54″N 94°08′55″W	Fayetteville	
111	Lynn Shelton American Legion Post No. 27	Lynn Shelton American Legion Post No. 27	January 4, 1996 (#95001480)	28 S. College Ave. 36°03′43″N 94°09′26″W	Fayetteville	
112	Shiloh Church	Shiloh Church	June 5, 1975 (#75000418)	Huntsville and Main Sts. 36°11′17″N 94°07′52″W	Springdale	
113	Shiloh Historic District	Shiloh Historic District	August 31, 1978 (#78000640)	Roughly bounded by Spring Creek, Shiloh, Johnson, Mill, and Spring Sts. 36°11′19″N 94°07′53″W	Springdale	
114	Skillern House	Skillern House	January 27, 2015 (#14001203)	3470 E. Skillern Rd. 36°06′05″N 94°06′22″W	Fayetteville	
115	Tom Smith House	Tom Smith House	October 8, 1992 (#92001344)	Highway 74 west of its junction with Highway 295, northeast of Elkins; 36°02′17″N 93°57′41″W	Elkins	
116	Peter Smyth House	Peter Smyth House	October 4, 2002 (#02001080)	1629 Crossover St. 36°04′56″N 94°07′17″W	Fayetteville	
117	Son's Chapel	Son's Chapel	September 25, 2003 (#03000949)	5480 E. Mission; 36°06′06″N 94°04′56″W	Fayetteville	
118	Southern Mercantile Building	Southern Mercantile Building	June 14, 1990 (#90000898)	107 E. Buchanan; 35°58′31″N 94°19′00″W	Prairie Grove	
119	Spring Valley School District 120 Building	Spring Valley School District 120 Building	September 4, 1992 (#92001119)	County Road 379; 36°10′39″N 93°55′56″W	Spring Valley	
120	Springdale Poultry Industry Historic District	Springdale Poultry Industry Historic District	September 23, 2011 (#11000695)	317 & 319 E. Emma & 316 E. Meadow Aves. 36°11′04″N 94°07′40″W	Springdale	
121	Stokenbury Cemetery	Stokenbury Cemetery	February 4, 2010 (#09000799)	Highway 16; 36°00′52″N 94°00′31″W	Elkins	
122	Stone House	Stone House	September 4, 1970 (#70000132)	207 Center St. 36°03′17″N 94°09′56″W	Fayetteville	
123	Strengthen the Arm of Liberty Monument	Strengthen the Arm of Liberty Monument	July 31, 2012 (#12000279)	3215 North Northhills Boulevard; 36°06′37″N 94°09′35″W	Fayetteville	Originally listed on the National Register November 1, 2000 (refnum 00001264), but removed January 27, 2012 due to improper relocation. Relisted August 16, 2012.
124	Student Union Building-University of Arkansas, Fayetteville	Student Union Building-University of Arkansas, Fayetteville	September 4, 1992 (#92001104)	Southeastern corner of the junction of Campus Dr. and Maple St. 36°04′11″N 94°10′15″W	Fayetteville	
125	Tharp House	Tharp House	January 21, 2004 (#03001461)	15 N. West Ave. 36°03′48″N 94°09′56″W	Fayetteville	
126	John Tilley House	John Tilley House	November 2, 1978 (#78000639)	West of Prairie Grove on Stonewall Rd. 35°59′34″N 94°23′08″W	Prairie Grove	
127	Tisdale Store-Goshen Post Office		January 16, 2024 (#100009770)	119 Tuttle Rd. 36°06′02″N 93°59′27″W	Goshen	
128	Tontitown School Building	Tontitown School Building	September 4, 1992 (#92001117)	U.S. Highway 412; 36°10′36″N 94°14′00″W	Tontitown	
129	Tweedy-Puntch House		September 27, 2019 (#100004435)	1411 W. Emma Ave. 36°11′07″N 94°08′42″W	Springdale	
130	Twin Bridges Historic District	Twin Bridges Historic District	March 7, 1994 (#94000162)	County Road 3412 across an unnamed creek and Old County Road 11 across Baron Fork; 35°52′35″N 94°27′12″W	Morrow	
131	United Presbyterian Church of Canehill	United Presbyterian Church of Canehill	November 17, 1982 (#82000955)	Main St. 35°54′36″N 94°23′46″W	Canehill	
132	University of Arkansas Campus Historic District	University of Arkansas Campus Historic District	September 23, 2009 (#09000745)	Roughly bounded by Garland Ave., Maple St., Arkansas Ave., and Dickson St. 36°04′06″N 94°10′19″W	Fayetteville	
133	Vernon & Moore-McIlroy Produce Warehouse		September 10, 2020 (#100005594)	200 North West Ave. 36°03′54″N 94°09′55″W	Fayetteville	
134	John S. Vest House	John S. Vest House	November 27, 1979 (#79003103)	21 N. West St. 36°03′48″N 94°09′56″W	Fayetteville	
135	Villa Rosa	Villa Rosa	December 27, 1990 (#90001946)	617 W. Lafayette; 36°04′05″N 94°10′03″W	Fayetteville	
136	Wade-Heerwagen House	Wade-Heerwagen House	June 15, 1978 (#78000637)	338 Washington Ave., N. 36°04′03″N 94°09′20″W	Fayetteville	
137	Walker Family Plot	Walker Family Plot	September 24, 2012 (#12000807)	514 E. Rock St. 36°03′39″N 94°09′11″W	Fayetteville	
138	Walker House		June 10, 1975 (#75000417)	Knerr Rd. 36°03′29″N 94°08′59″W	Fayetteville	
139	Vol Walker Library-University of Arkansas, Fayetteville	Vol Walker Library-University of Arkansas, Fayetteville	September 4, 1992 (#92001105)	Campus Dr. 36°04′07″N 94°10′21″W	Fayetteville	
140	Walnut Grove Presbyterian Church	Walnut Grove Presbyterian Church	December 7, 1995 (#95001411)	Highway 170; 36°00′08″N 94°16′03″W	Farmington	
141	Washington County Courthouse	Washington County Courthouse	February 23, 1972 (#72000212)	4 S. College Ave. 36°03′45″N 94°09′27″W	Fayetteville	
142	Washington County Jail	Washington County Jail	December 1, 1978 (#78000638)	College and County Aves. 36°03′42″N 94°09′27″W	Fayetteville	
143	Weathers House		January 23, 2023 (#100008570)	1602 Delaware Pl. 36°09′32″N 94°08′54″W	Springdale	
144	Washington-Willow Historic District	Washington-Willow Historic District	May 23, 1980 (#80000789)	Roughly bounded by College and Walnut Aves. and Rebecca and Spring Sts.; also roughly Spring, Dickson, Sutton, and Lafayette Sts. from Olive Ave. to Willow Ave., and the junction of Rebecca St. and Willow; 36°04′08″N 94°09′19″W	Fayetteville	Second set of boundaries represents a boundary increase of March 28, 1995
145	Waterman-Archer House	Waterman-Archer House	June 25, 1999 (#99000730)	2148 Markham; 36°04′10″N 94°11′21″W	Fayetteville	
146	William Welch House		November 17, 1982 (#82000956)	Main St. 35°54′29″N 94°23′45″W	Canehill	
147	West Dickson Street Commercial Historic District	West Dickson Street Commercial Historic District	October 1, 2007 (#07001028)	Dickson St. between Arkansas and St. Charles Aves., and West Ave. between Dickson and Lafayette Sts. 36°03′59″N 94°09′52″W	Fayetteville	
148	White River Bridge at Elkins	White River Bridge at Elkins	January 24, 2008 (#07001437)	County Road 44. 36°00′03″N 94°00′14″W	Elkins	
149	John G. Williams House #2		February 13, 2020 (#100004942)	140 North Sang Ave. 36°03′57″N 94°11′19″W	Fayetteville	
150	Wilson Park Historic District	Wilson Park Historic District	March 31, 1995 (#95000365)	Roughly bounded by College Ave., Maple St., Wilson Ave., and Louise St. 36°04′15″N 94°09′44″W	Fayetteville	
151	Wilson-Pittman-Campbell-Gregory House	Wilson-Pittman-Campbell-Gregory House	May 6, 1980 (#80000790)	405 E. Dickson St. 36°03′55″N 94°09′07″W	Fayetteville	
152	Winslow Commercial Historic District		January 12, 2022 (#100007325)	108, 150, and 182 North Winslow Blvd. 35°48′03″N 94°08′06″W	Winslow	
153	Woolsey Farmstead Cemetery		September 21, 2020 (#100005595)	535 South Broyles Rd. 36°03′32″N 94°14′07″W	Fayetteville	
154	Mrs. Young Building	Mrs. Young Building	June 25, 1999 (#99000731)	5 S. Block Ave. 36°03′51″N 94°10′13″W	Fayetteville	

== Former listings ==
	Name on the Register	Image	Date listed	Date removed	Location	City or town	Description
1	Bariola Farm		March 5, 1992 (#92000096)	January 26, 2015	329 Ardemagni Rd. 36°10′50″N 94°14′45″W	Tontitown	
2	Cane Hill Road Bridge	Cane Hill Road Bridge	January 21, 2010 (#09001261)	May 5, 2025	Highway 170 over the Little Red River; 36°00′01″N 94°16′30″W	Prairie Grove	Replaced in 2014
3	Dodson Memorial Building		September 4, 1992 (#92001118)	October 7, 2009	Northeastern corner of the junction of Pleasant St. and Emma Ave. 36°11′07″N 94°08′33″W	Springdale	
4	Durham School	Durham School	September 4, 1992 (#92001121)	January 26, 2018	County Road 183; 35°57′04″N 93°58′48″W	Durham	
5	Adrian Fletcher Residence	Adrian Fletcher Residence	May 28, 2013 (#13000317)	May 12, 2021	6725 Washington Road; 36°02′37″N 94°03′39″W	Fayetteville	
6	Kantz House		November 14, 1980 (#80000788)	September 17, 1999	East of Fayetteville at 2650 Mission St.	Fayetteville	Delisted due to relocation and extensive modification.
7	St. Joseph Catholic Church	St. Joseph Catholic Church	March 2, 2006 (#06000080)	January 2, 2024	110 E. Henri de Tonti Boulevard; 36°10′43″N 94°14′06″W	Tontitown	
8	Washington County Road 35 Bridge	Washington County Road 35 Bridge	June 9, 2000 (#00000637)	January 16, 2026	County Road 35; 35°53′01″N 94°09′53″W	Woolsey	
9	Washington County Road 80F Bridge		May 5, 1995 (#95000565)	May 25, 2004	County Road 80F over the Muddy Fork of the Illinois River	Viney Grove	
10	Waters-Pierce Oil Company Building		December 8, 1988 (#88002821)	September 24, 2004	West St.	Fayetteville	
11	Wyman Bridge	Wyman Bridge	April 9, 1990 (#90000526)	September 24, 2004	County Road 38 over the West Fork of the White River	Fayetteville	Delisted due to collapse.

== See also ==
- List of National Historic Landmarks in Arkansas
- National Register of Historic Places listings in Arkansas
