= Routh-Bailey House =

Historic house in Arkansas, United States

- U.S. National Register of Historic Places
- Location within Arkansas Location within the United States
- Location: Old Wire Rd., Fayetteville, Arkansas
- Coordinates: 36°6′37″N 94°7′6″W
- Area: 4 acres (1.6 ha)
- Built: 1850
- Architectural style: Greek Revival
- NRHP reference No.: 89001592
- Added to NRHP: September 28, 1989

The Routh-Bailey House is a historic house on Old Wire Road in Fayetteville, Arkansas. It is a two-story brick I-house with Greek Revival styling. Completed about 1850, it is rare within the state as a surviving antebellum brick farmhouse. It was built by Benjamin Routh on land granted to him in 1848 by President Zachary Taylor. When it was listed on the National Register of Historic Places in 1989 it was described as being in deteriorated condition. It is located east of Arkansas Highway 265 (from which it may be visible), northwest of a north-to-east bend in Old Wire Road.

== See also ==
- National Register of Historic Places listings in Washington County, Arkansas
