= Prairie Grove Commercial Historic District =

Historic district in Arkansas, United States

- U.S. National Register of Historic Places
- U.S. Historic district
- Location within Arkansas Location within the United States
- Location: Odd numbers 107-305 E Buchanan & 123 S Neal Sts., Prairie Grove, Arkansas
- Coordinates: 35°58′33″N 94°18′56″W
- Area: 2.6 acres (1.1 ha)
- NRHP reference No.: 100002567
- Added to NRHP: June 25, 2018

The Prairie Grove Commercial Historic District encompasses part of the historic commercial downtown area of Prairie Grove, Arkansas. It extends for about 1-1/2 blocks on the south side of East Buchanan Street, from Mock Street to an alley east of Neal Street. The buildings on this side of the street more mostly built in the late 19th and early 20th centuries, and are good examples of brick and stone commercial architecture of the period. The district also includes a small portion of Mock Park, and two buildings constructed in the 1960s.

The district was listed on the National Register of Historic Places in 2018.

== See also ==
- National Register of Historic Places listings in Washington County, Arkansas
