= Son's Chapel =

Historic church in Arkansas, United States

- U.S. National Register of Historic Places
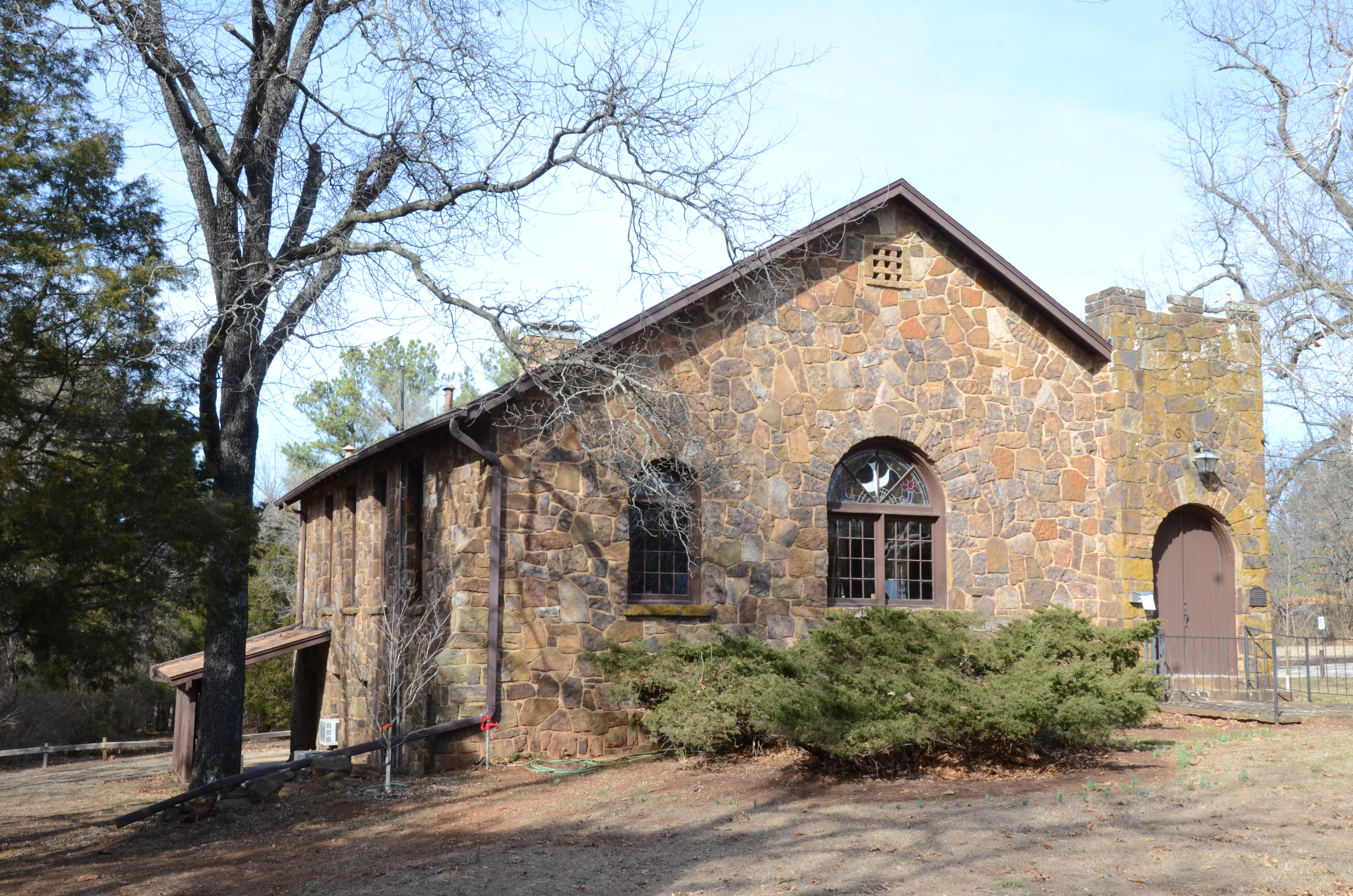

- Location within Arkansas Location within the United States
- Location: 5480 East Mission, Fayetteville, Arkansas
- Coordinates: 36°6′6″N 94°4′56″W
- Area: 2.1 acres (0.85 ha)
- Built: 1933
- Architect: Shelton, Thayer
- Architectural style: Romanesque
- NRHP reference No.: 03000949
- Added to NRHP: September 25, 2003

Son's Chapel is a historic church at 5480 East Mission in Fayetteville, Arkansas. It is a single-story rustic fieldstone structure, with front-gable roof and a squat square tower set off to one side. Built between 1933 and 1937, the building is an interesting and unusual mix of Gothic and Romanesque styles, with windows set under Romanesque arches, and the tower with a crenellated parapet. The church is the second for the congregation, which was established c. 1848 on land donated by Michael Son.

The known history of this area starts in approximately 1842. By the Treaty of Dancing Rabbit Creek, this land of 160 acres was in a tract issued to a Choctaw man, Ah-To-Chubee. After his death, the land was deposited in the general land office in Fayetteville.

Michael Son was born in Virginia and his wife Nancy (born in South Carolina) in the late 1770s. They, and other Son family members migrated to NW Arkansas via Kentucky and Missouri, and were issued a patent to 40 acres of the land in 1848. This community is called "Son's Chapel" after the two brothers: Michael & Abram Son, who settled here, in what was wooded farmland. The Son's built a home and in 1852, being good community citizens, conveyed about 2 acres of land, for $2, to the Methodist Protestant Church, for a cemetery and church yard. A log chapel, called "Son's Chapel", was built on the north end of the cemetery and was used for both church activities and a community school. Three different denominations held services there in the early days as well as various community groups who also used the building.

When the small log building could no longer serve the needs of a growing farm community, a frame school house was built across the road (behind the current chapel) and discussion started about how a community center could be built.

The Rural Builders Association, formed in 1922, still supports the care and maintenance of the building through fund raising efforts. Son's Chapel was listed on the National Register of Historic Places as of September 25, 2003. The bronze plaque is mounted outside the front door.

The Son's Chapel Cemetery across the street has acquired several more tracts of land to attain its present size and is one of the oldest cemeteries in the county. While no "famous" people are buried there, there are many old pioneer graves, and some unmarked graves, whether pauper, slave or Indian. It is still an active cemetery with its own Board of Trustees, who holds an annual workday and Memorial Service on Memorial Day week-end. Nancy Son, wife of Michael Son is the only Son buried there. Michael Son is buried with his brother in Missouri. In the mid 19th Century, the City of Fayetteville built the County Poor Farm adjacent to the Cemetery and most probably buried some indigents in unmarked graves. The "Poor Farm" was here until relocated to Mt. Comfort in the 1880s.

Bibliography: The History of Son's Chapel by Trisha Beland, presented to WCHS in 2007

The building was listed on the National Register of Historic Places in 2003.

== See also ==
- National Register of Historic Places listings in Washington County, Arkansas
