= Mount Sequoyah Cottages =

Historic houses in Arkansas, United States

- U.S. National Register of Historic Places
- U.S. Historic district
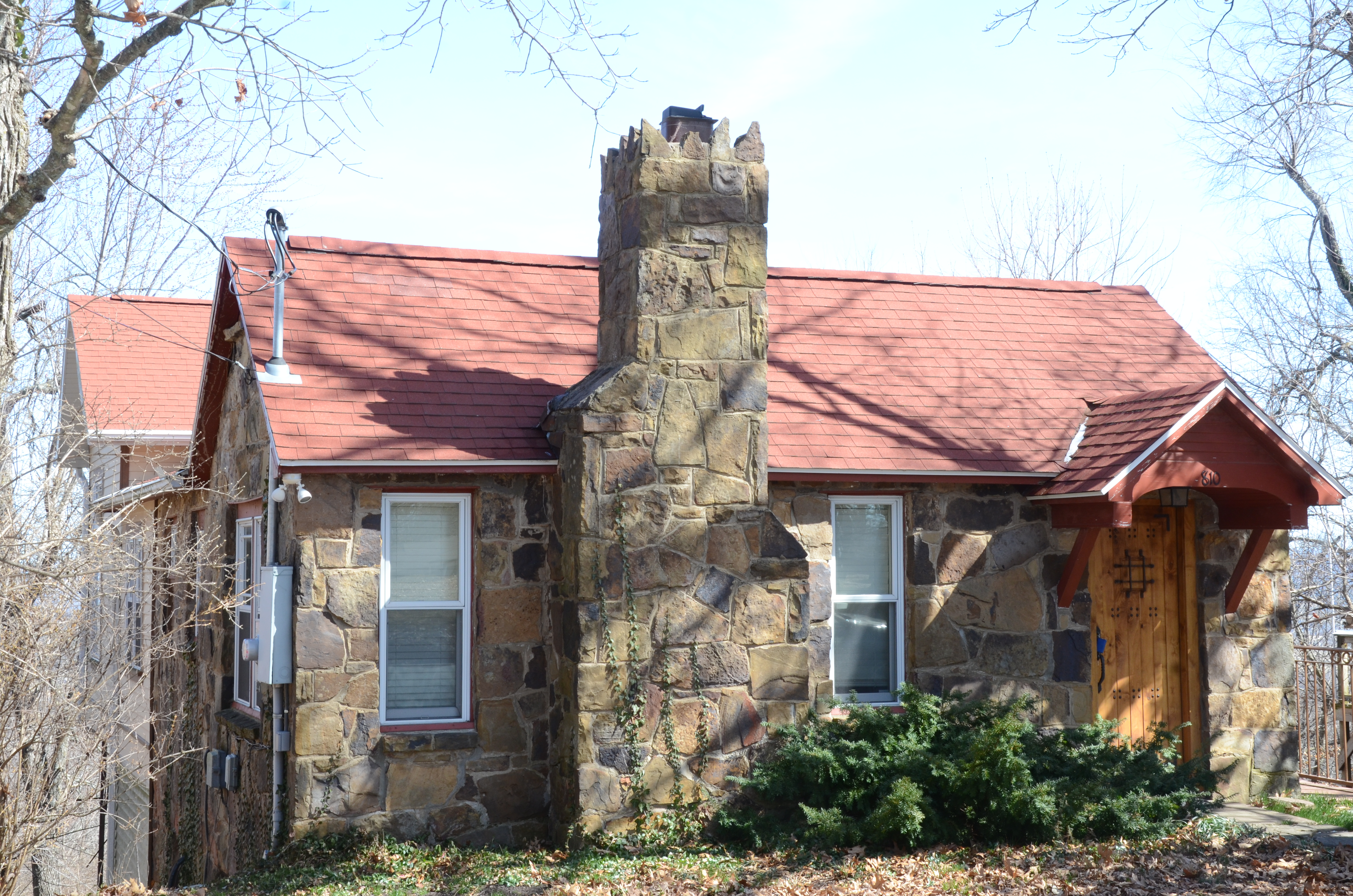
- 810 E. Skyline Dr.

- Location within Arkansas Location within the United States
- Location: 808 & 810 E. Skyline Dr., Fayetteville, Arkansas
- Coordinates: 36.06459°N 94.143564°W
- Area: 2.9 acres (1.2 ha)
- Built: c. 1920
- NRHP reference No.: 12000278
- Added to NRHP: August 6, 2012

The Mount Sequoyah Cottages are a pair of historic summer cabins at 808 and 810 East Skyline Drive in Fayetteville, Arkansas. They were built in the 1920s, around the time that the adjacent Mount Sequoyah Methodist summer camp was developed, and represent a period when the "back to nature" movement was a leading element in the development of summer properties.

The cottages were listed on the National Register of Historic Places in 2012.

== See also ==
- National Register of Historic Places listings in Washington County, Arkansas
