= Hantz House =

Historic house in Arkansas, United States

- U.S. National Register of Historic Places
- Cover sheet for HABS file on the Hantz House

- Location within Arkansas Location within the United States
- Location: 855 Fairview Dr., Fayetteville, Arkansas
- Coordinates: 36°3′52″N 94°10′21″W
- Area: less than one acre
- Built: 1950
- Architect: E. Fay Jones
- Architectural style: Modern Movement
- MPS: Arkansas Designs of E. Fay Jones MPS AD
- NRHP reference No.: 01001233
- Added to NRHP: November 19, 2001

The Hantz House is a historic house at 855 Fairview Drive in Fayetteville, Arkansas. It is a single-story Mid-Century Modern frame structure, with a two-level flat roof and cantilevered decks projecting from its concrete block foundation. The exterior is finished in board-and-batten siding, with ribbons of casement windows providing illumination. The massing of the house has a taller central section, which provides an open-plan public space with kitchen, dining, and living areas, with lower-height private space housing bedrooms and bathroom. The house was designed by Fay Jones and his classmate Ernie Jacks while they were architecture students at the University of Arkansas. The house was built in 1951 for Katherine and Harold Hantz, the latter then chair of the university's philosophy department.

The house was listed on the National Register of Historic Places in 2001.

== See also ==
- National Register of Historic Places listings in Washington County, Arkansas
