= Adrian Fletcher Residence =

Historic house in Arkansas, United States

- Formerly listed on the U.S. National Register of Historic Places
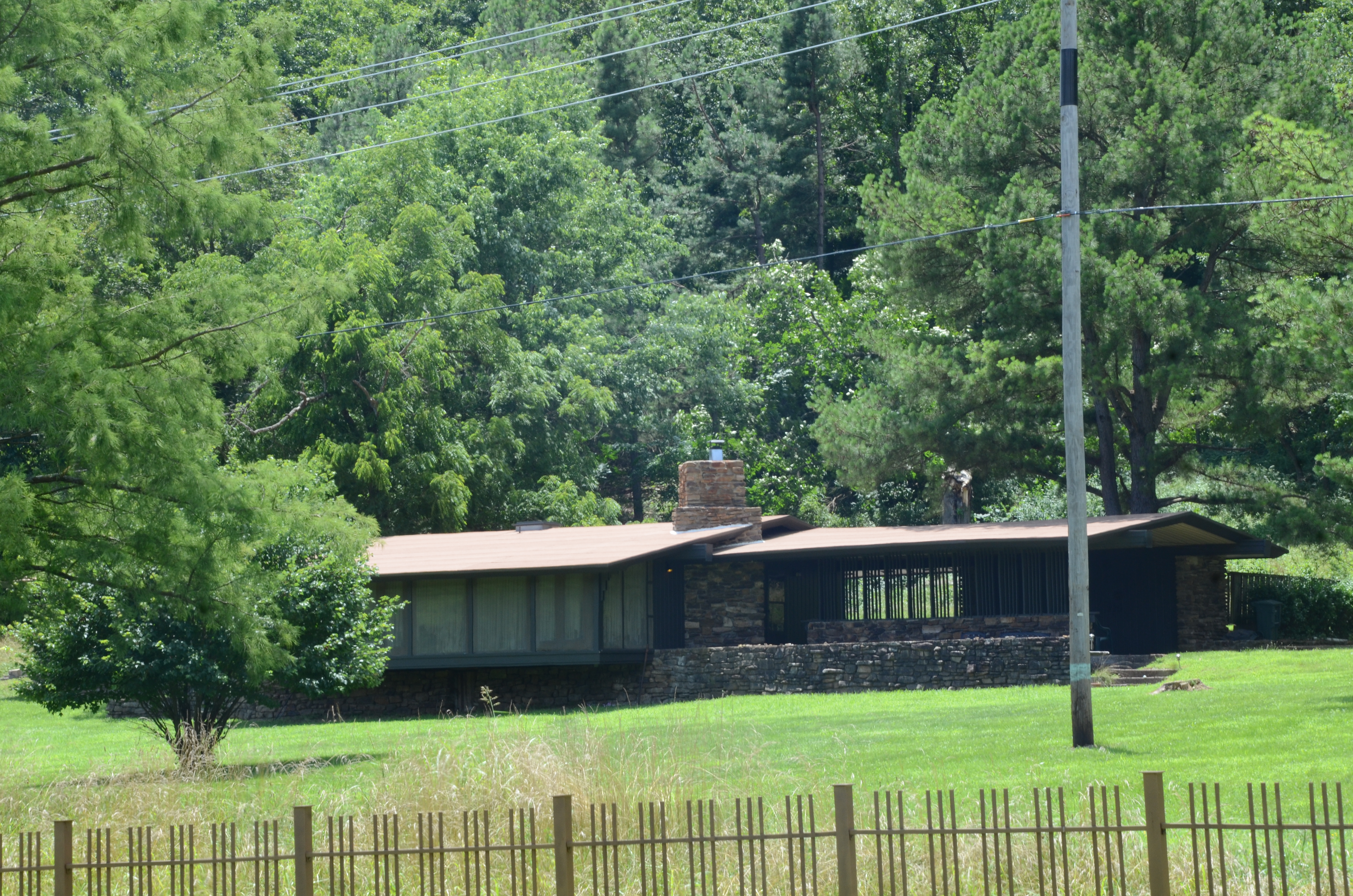
- 2015 photo

- Location within Arkansas Location within the United States
- Location: 6725 Washington Road, Fayetteville, Arkansas
- Coordinates: 36°2′37″N 94°3′39″W
- Area: 80 acres (32 ha)
- Built: 1957
- Architectural style: Mid-Century Modern
- NRHP reference No.: 13000317

Significant dates
- Added to NRHP: May 28, 2013
- Removed from NRHP: May 12, 2021

The Adrian Fletcher Residence was a historic house at 6725 Washington (East Huntsville) Road in Fayetteville, Arkansas. It was a single-story stone and wood structure with a shallow-pitched gable roof, set near the north side of an 80-acre (32 ha) parcel of land on the south side of East Huntsville Road. It was divided roughly into three sections, consisting of the main house, an open breezeway, and a carport. Built in 1957, it was a significant early work of E. Fay Jones, a protégé of Frank Lloyd Wright; it was his first commission completed after official recognition as an architect, and it became a showcase of his work, being written up and photographed for several magazines.

The house was listed on the National Register of Historic Places in 2013.

Bill Clinton lived there in the mid-1970s while he was a law professor at the University of Arkansas in Fayetteville. The house burned down on June 8, 2017, and was declared a total loss. It was delisted from the National Register in 2021.

== See also ==
- National Register of Historic Places listings in Washington County, Arkansas
