= Walker Family Plot =

Historic cemetery in Arkansas, United States

- U.S. National Register of Historic Places
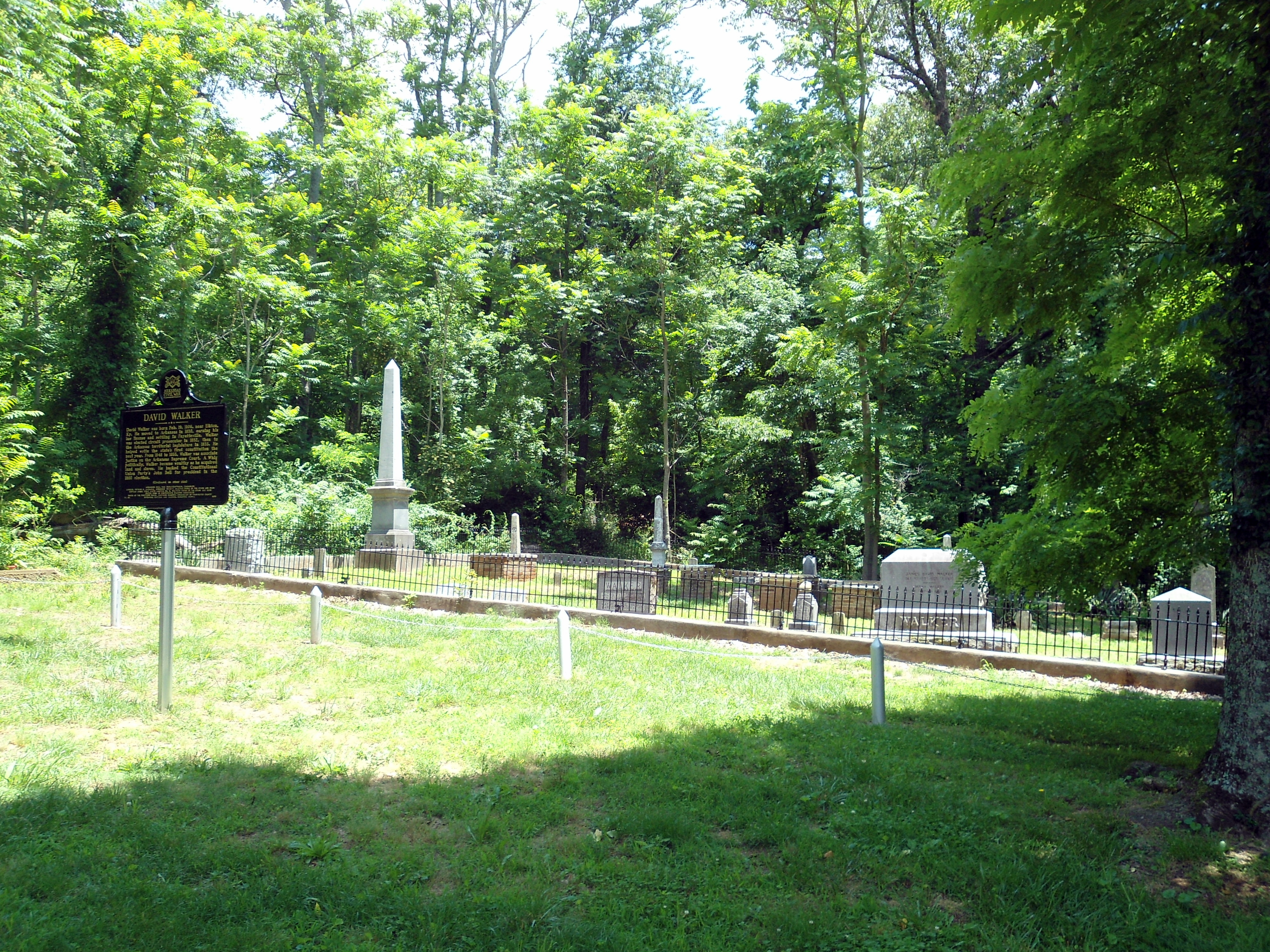

- Location within Arkansas Location within the United States
- Location: East Rock St., east of Confederate Cemetery, Fayetteville, Arkansas
- Coordinates: 36°3′40″N 94°9′6″W
- Area: less than one acre
- Built: 1838
- NRHP reference No.: 12000807
- Added to NRHP: September 24, 2012

The Walker Family Plot is a historic cemetery on East Rock Road in Fayetteville, Arkansas. Located just east of the Fayetteville Confederate Cemetery, this small cemetery stands ringed by a low wrought iron fence. It is the burial site of many members of the locally prominent Walker family, with burials dating to 1838. Its most notable burial is that of David Walker (d. 1879), a lawyer, judge, and leading political figure and landowner of the region.

The cemetery was listed on the National Register of Historic Places in 2012.

== See also ==
- National Register of Historic Places listings in Washington County, Arkansas
