= Moore House (Canehill, Arkansas) =

Historic house in Arkansas, United States

- U.S. National Register of Historic Places
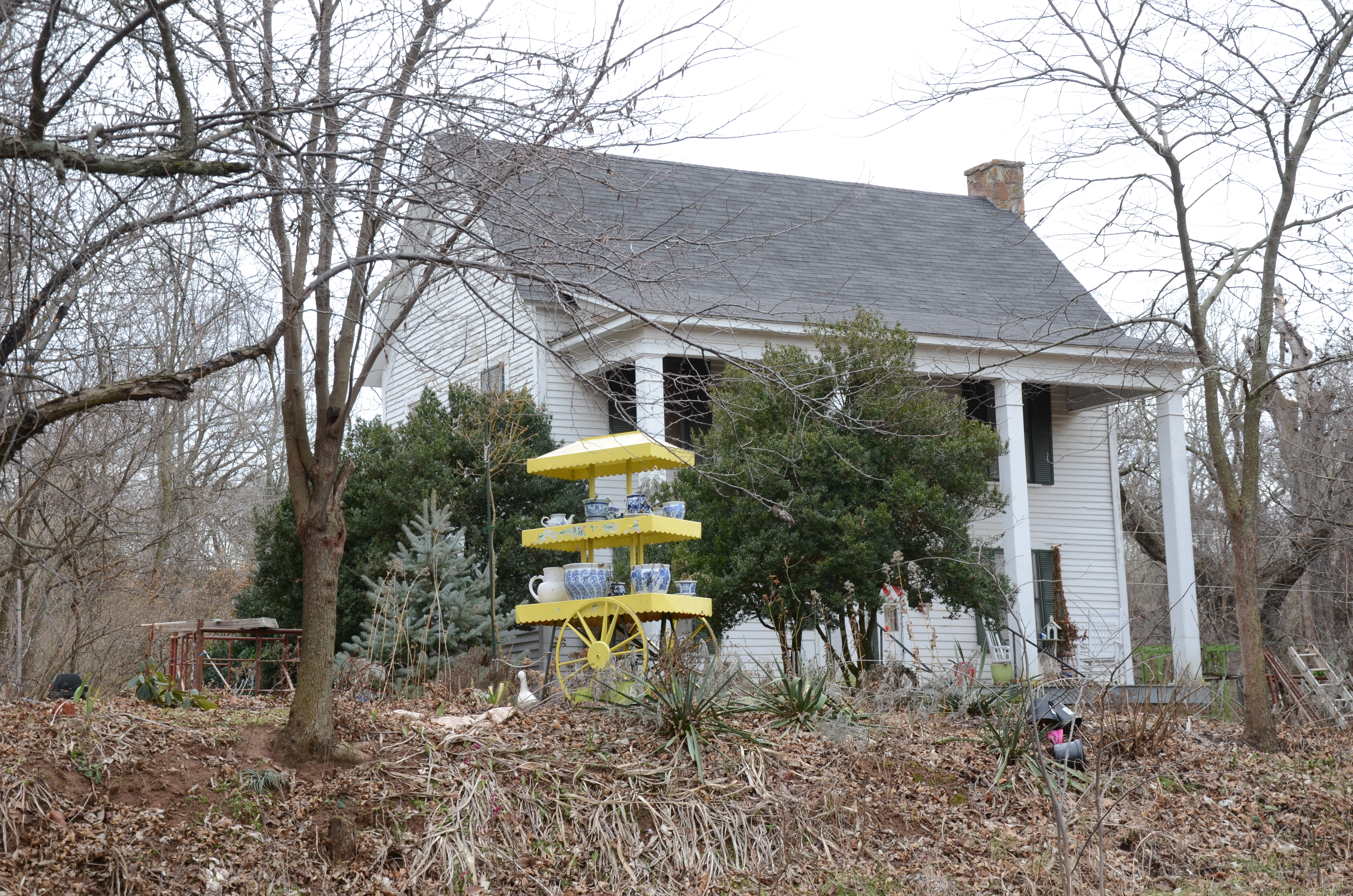
- Location: NW of Canehill on SR 13, Canehill, Arkansas
- Area: 1.5 acres (0.61 ha)
- Built: 1856
- MPS: Canehill MRA
- NRHP reference No.: 82000951
- Added to NRHP: November 17, 1982

The Moore House is a historic house on Washington County Road 13 northwest of Canehill, Arkansas. It is a two-story wood-frame house, three bays wide, with a side gable roof, clapboard siding, and a shed-roof porch extending across the front. The first floor of the house was built in 1856, with the second following in 1896; a kitchen ell was added to the rear in 1893. The property also includes the remains of an early log structure, probably a granary.

The house was listed on the National Register of Historic Places in 1982.

== See also ==
- National Register of Historic Places listings in Washington County, Arkansas
