= David and Mary Margaret Durst House =

Historic house in Arkansas, United States

- U.S. National Register of Historic Places
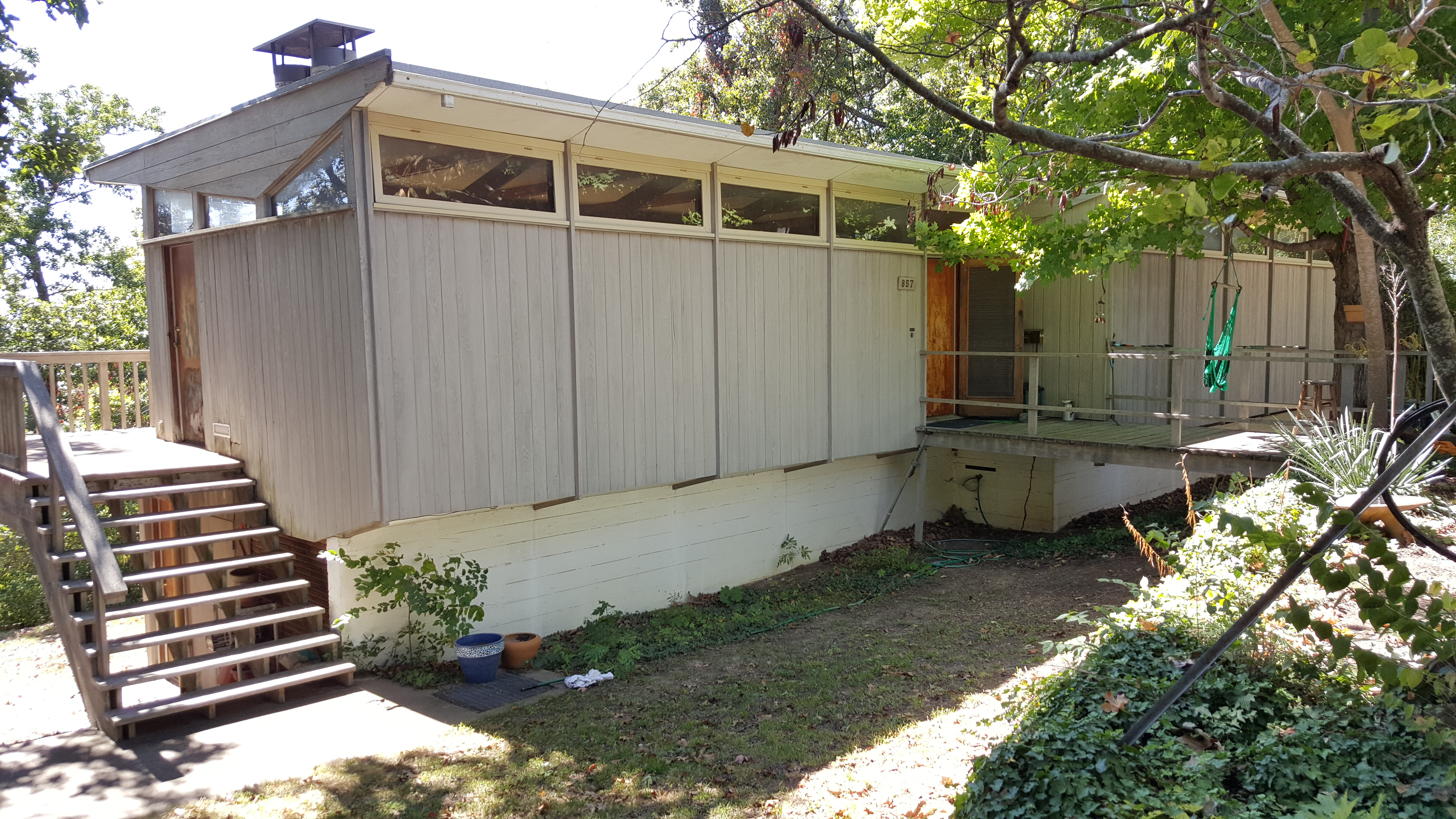

- Location within Arkansas Location within the United States
- Location: 857 Fairview Dr., Fayetteville, Arkansas
- Coordinates: 36°3′51″N 94°10′22″W
- Area: less than one acre
- Built: 1952
- Architect: John G. Williams
- Architectural style: Modern Movement
- NRHP reference No.: 15000288
- Added to NRHP: May 28, 2015

The David and Mary Margaret Durst House is a historic house at 857 Fairview Drive in Fayetteville, Arkansas. It is a post-and-beam structure, long and narrow, which is in places cantilevered over a concrete foundation poured in board forms that left vertical marks in the concrete. The building has a flat tar and gravel roof, unusual at the time of its construction for residential architecture. The house was the first major design of architect John G. Williams, made in collaboration with his clients, David and Mary Margaret Durst. David Durst was at the time chairman of the art department at the University of Arkansas at Fayetteville, and Williams was the head of its Architecture Department.

The house was listed on the National Register of Historic Places in 2015.

== See also ==
- National Register of Historic Places listings in Washington County, Arkansas
