= Happy Hollow Farm =

Historic house in Arkansas, United States

- U.S. National Register of Historic Places
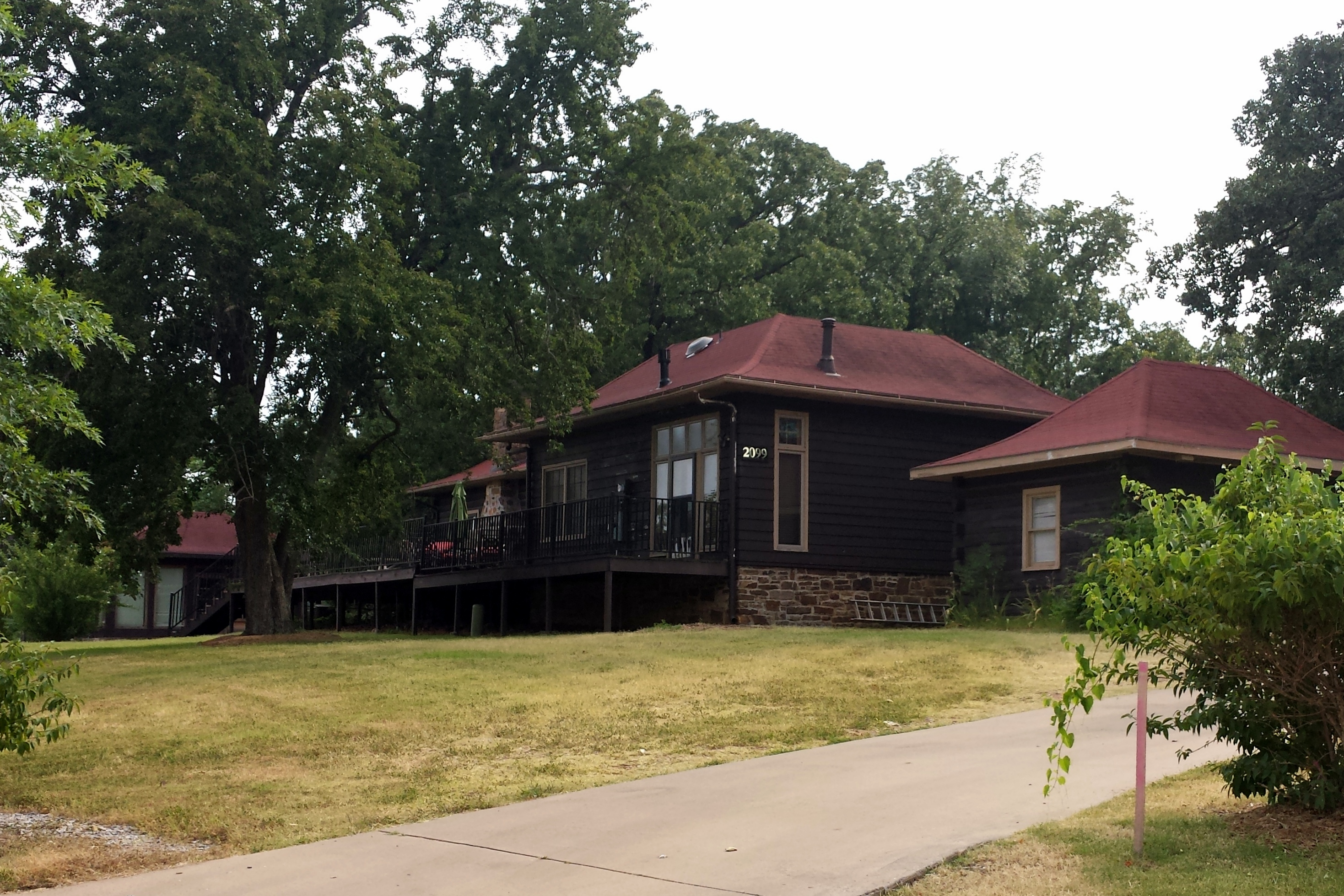

- Location within Arkansas Location within the United States
- Location: 2099 Aqua Crossing, Fayetteville, Arkansas
- Coordinates: 36°3′47″N 94°7′51″W
- Area: 32.5 acres (13.2 ha)
- Built: 1909
- Built by: William Lighton
- Architectural style: H-Plan
- NRHP reference No.: 86002241
- Added to NRHP: August 6, 1986

Happy Hollow Farm is a historic house at 2099 Aqua Crossing in Fayetteville, Arkansas. It is a large single-story log house, shaped in an H, with a broad flared hip roof. The logs are stacked and held in place with spikes, rather than being notched at the corners. The property also includes a small log milk house and a stone cottage, all contemporaneous to the house's 1909-10 construction. The house was built by writer William Rheen Lighton, who made a reputation writing for major periodicals including the Saturday Evening Post, and published several novels and non-fiction books, including one named Happy Hollow Farm that romanticized life on an Arkansas farm.

The house was listed on the National Register of Historic Places in 1986.

== See also ==
- National Register of Historic Places listings in Washington County, Arkansas
