= Warren Segraves House =

Historic house in Arkansas, United States

- U.S. National Register of Historic Places
- Location within Arkansas Location within the United States
- Location: 217 N. Oklahoma Way, Fayetteville, Arkansas
- Coordinates: 36°3′54″N 94°8′55″W
- Area: less than one acre
- Built: 1959
- Architectural style: Mid-Century Modern
- NRHP reference No.: 100001016
- Added to NRHP: June 5, 2017

The Warren Segraves House is a historic house at 217 Oklahoma Way in Fayetteville, Arkansas. It is a two-story structure, finished in vertical board siding and brick. Its street-facing east facade has small windows, while the western facade is almost all glass, providing view over the valley to the west. The house was built in 1959 to a design by Arkansas architect Warren Segraves for his family's use, and is a good example of Mid-Century Modern residential architecture. Its most distinctive feature is a series of diamond-shaped panels that give the roof an accordion shape.

The house was listed on the National Register of Historic Places in 2017.

== See also ==
- National Register of Historic Places listings in Washington County, Arkansas
