= William Welch House =

Historic house in Arkansas, United States

- U.S. National Register of Historic Places
- Location within Arkansas Location within the United States
- Location: Main St., Canehill, Arkansas
- Coordinates: 35°54′29″N 94°23′45″W
- Area: less than one acre
- Built: 1850
- Architectural style: Greek Revival
- MPS: Canehill MRA
- NRHP reference No.: 82000956
- Added to NRHP: November 17, 1982

The William Welch House is a historic house on Main Street in Canehill, Arkansas. It is a 1 1/2-story wood-frame structure, with a side-gable roof, chimneys at the sides, and additions to the rear giving it a rough T shape. A gable-roofed portico shelters the entrance, which is centered in the main three-bay facade. The portico's gable, along with the house's gable ends and roofline, have been decorated with scalloped woodwork, probably added in the 1870s. The house itself was probably built in the 1850s, and is one of Canehill's few antebellum houses, offering a distinctive combination of vernacular Greek Revival and later Victorian stylistic touches.

The house was listed on the National Register of Historic Places in 1982.

== See also ==
- National Register of Historic Places listings in Washington County, Arkansas
