= Skillern House =

Historic house in Arkansas, United States

- U.S. National Register of Historic Places
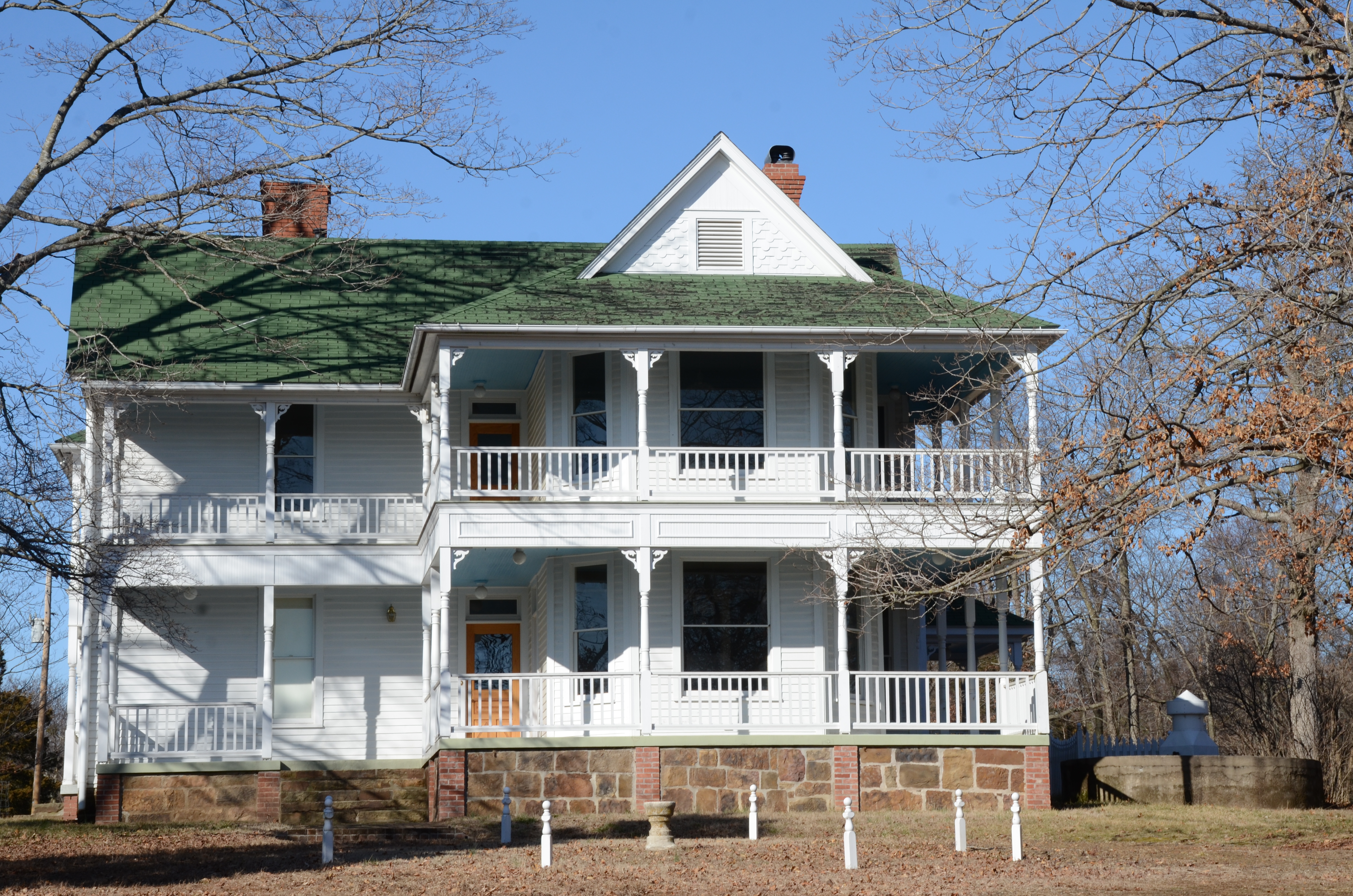

- Location within Arkansas Location within the United States
- Location: 3470 E. Skillern Rd., Fayetteville, Arkansas
- Coordinates: 36°6′5″N 94°6′22″W
- Built: 1904
- Architectural style: Folk Victorian
- NRHP reference No.: 14001203
- Added to NRHP: January 27, 2015

The Skillern House is a historic house at 3470 East Skillern Road in Fayetteville, Arkansas. Built in 1904–05, it is a fine local example of Folk Victorian architecture. It has Queen Anne detailing, including delicate turned porch posts with brackets, and decorative cut shingles in the gables.

The house was listed on the National Register of Historic Places in 2015.

== See also ==
- National Register of Historic Places listings in Washington County, Arkansas
