= Meadow Spring Historic District =

Historic district in Arkansas, United States

- U.S. National Register of Historic Places
- U.S. Historic district
- Location within Arkansas Location within the United States
- Location: Roughly bounded by NW, School, Locust & Church Aves. between W Dickson St. & W Mountain, Fayetteville, Arkansas
- Coordinates: 36°03′49″N 94°09′47″W
- Area: 22.5 acres (9.1 ha)
- Built: 1870
- Architectural style: Queen Anne, Craftsman, Traditional
- NRHP reference No.: 100003016
- Added to NRHP: March 25, 2019

The Meadow Spring Historic District encompasses a predominantly residential area north and west of the traditional center of Fayetteville, Arkansas. It covers an area of 22.5 acres (9.1 ha), and about 11 city blocks, roughly bounded by NW, School, Locust & Church Avenues. between W Dickson and W Mountain Streets. This area was developed beginning in 1870 (after the railroad arrived in the town) and features mainly single-family residences on large level lots. It contains a variety of well preserved housing from the late-19th to the mid-20th century, with both high-style and vernacular forms. Although there are a number of fine Queen Anne Victorians, the predominant styles are those of the early 20th century: Craftsman and a variety of Colonial, Tudor, and other revival styles.

The district was listed on the National Register of Historic Places in 2019.

== See also ==
- National Register of Historic Places listings in Washington County, Arkansas
