= Mack Morton Barn =

- Morton, Mack, Barn
- U.S. National Register of Historic Places
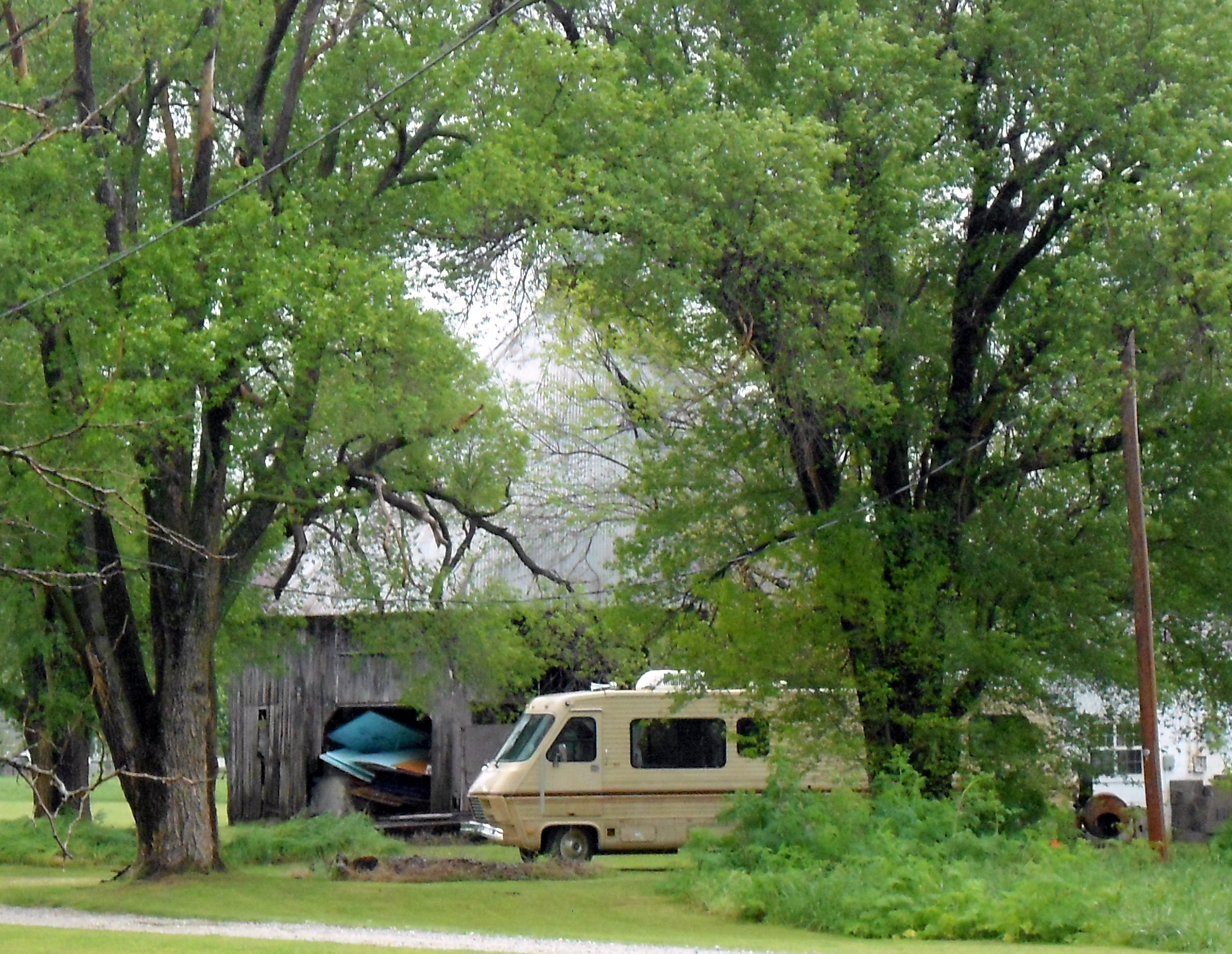

- Location within Arkansas Location within the United States
- Location: 11516 Appleby Rd., Appleby, Arkansas
- Coordinates: 36°1′15″N 94°14′42″W
- Area: less than one acre
- Built: 1900
- Built by: Mack Morton
- NRHP reference No.: 05000047
- Added to NRHP: February 15, 2005

The Mack Morton Barn is a historic eleven-sided barn at 11516 Appleby Road in Appleby, Arkansas. Built about 1900 to house cows and horses, it is sheathed in board-and-batten siding and topped by a hip roof with an eleven-sided cupola at the center. It is believed to be the only surviving geometrically unusual barn in the state.

The barn was listed on the National Register of Historic Places in 2005.

== See also ==
- National Register of Historic Places listings in Washington County, Arkansas
