= Fishback School =

- U.S. National Register of Historic Places
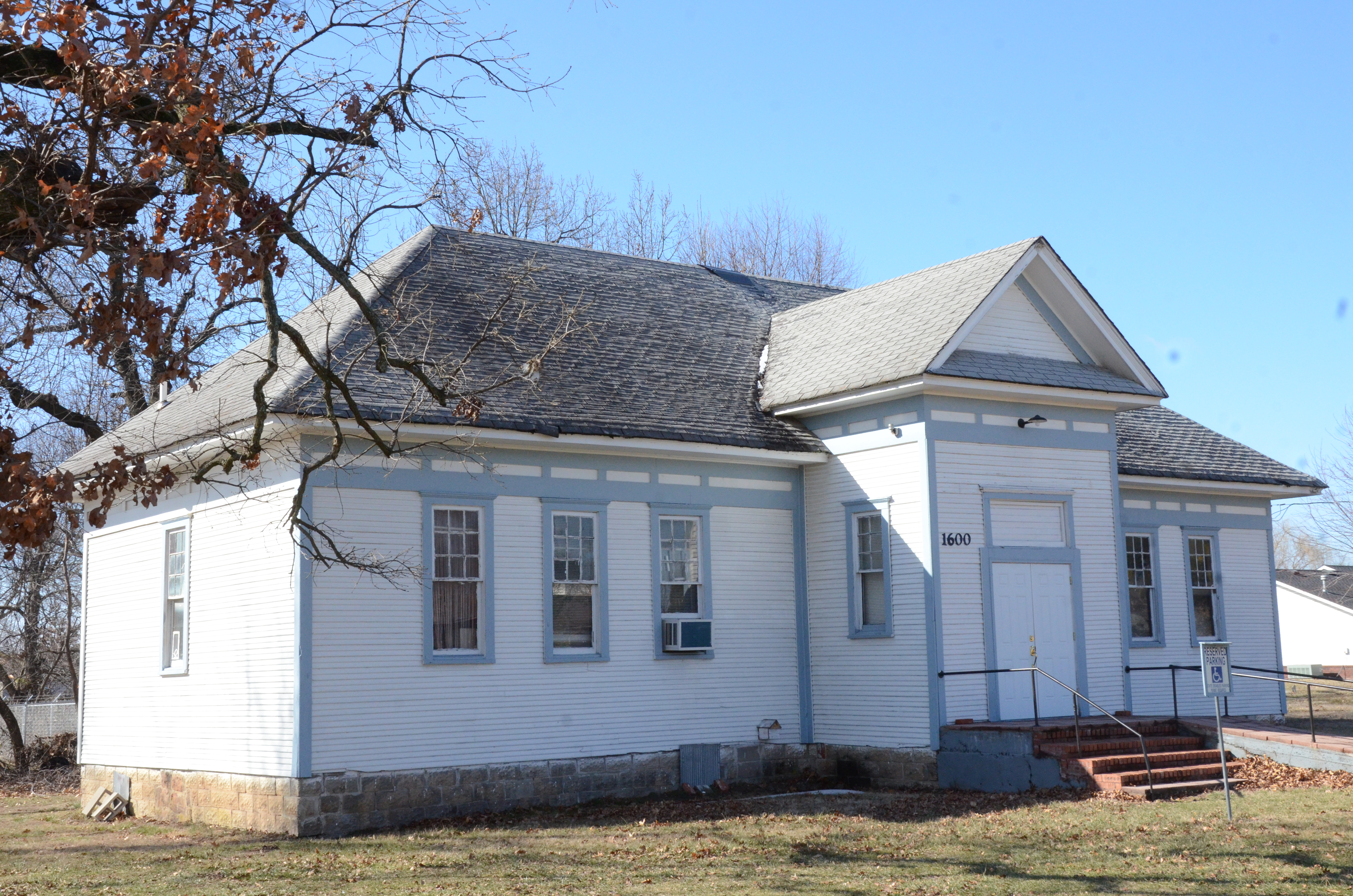

- Location within Arkansas Location within the United States
- Location: Butterfield Coach Road, Springdale, Arkansas
- Coordinates: 36°10′12″N 94°5′41″W
- Area: less than one acre
- Architectural style: Late 19th And Early 20th Century American Movements, Plain Traditional
- MPS: Public Schools in the Ozarks MPS
- NRHP reference No.: 92001120
- Added to NRHP: September 4, 1992

The Fishback School is a historic school building on Butterfield Coach Road in Springdale, Arkansas. It is a single-story wood-frame structure, with weatherboard siding, a concrete foundation, and a hip roof and a projecting gable-roofed entry section. The entry section has a deeply pedimented gable front, and a tall paneled friezeboard wraps around the building. The school was built in 1925, during a period of growth in Springdale due to rise as a local market hub.

The building was listed on the National Register of Historic Places in 1992.

== See also ==
- National Register of Historic Places listings in Washington County, Arkansas
