= Deepwood House =

Historic house in Arkansas, United States

- U.S. National Register of Historic Places
- Location within Arkansas Location within the United States
- Location: 4697 West Finger Rd., Fayetteville, Arkansas
- Coordinates: 36°2′10″N 94°12′43″W
- Area: c. 30 acres (12 ha)
- Built: c.1960
- Built by: Clifford & Charles Clevenger
- Architect: Herb Fowler
- Architectural style: Mid-Century Modern
- NRHP reference No.: 100002459
- Added to NRHP: May 21, 2018

Deepwood House is a historic house at 4697 West Finger Road in Fayetteville, Arkansas. Built about 1960, it was the personal residence of architect Herb Fowler. The property includes the main house, a guest house, and several outbuildings, all designed by Fowler and built by 1965. Building materials are wood and stone chosen to fit organically with the site, about 30 acres (12 ha) at the top of Kessler Mountain. The main house features a broad expanse of south-facing windows, and a sunken garden just to its west. It and the nearby guest house have gable-on-hip roofs, with extended eaves providing additional shade.

The house was the home of Fowler and his wife Marie (Judy) for 35 years, until they sold the property in 1995. Herb Keatinge Fowler (1921-April 10, 2008) was born in Lewiston, Idaho. He attended Yale University before and after serving in the U.S. Army during World War II. He was a founding member of, and long served, the architecture department at the University of Arkansas in Fayetteville.

The house was listed on the National Register of Historic Places in 2018.

== See also ==
- National Register of Historic Places listings in Washington County, Arkansas
