= List of cemeteries in Arkansas =

This list of cemeteries in Arkansas includes currently operating, historical (closed for new interments), and defunct (graves abandoned or removed) cemeteries, columbaria, and mausolea which are historical and/or notable. It does not include pet cemeteries.

== Ashley County ==
- Bethel Cemetery, near Crossett
- Hamburg Cemetery, Hamburg; NRHP-listed

== Baxter County ==
- Wolf Cemetery; NRHP-listed

== Benton County ==
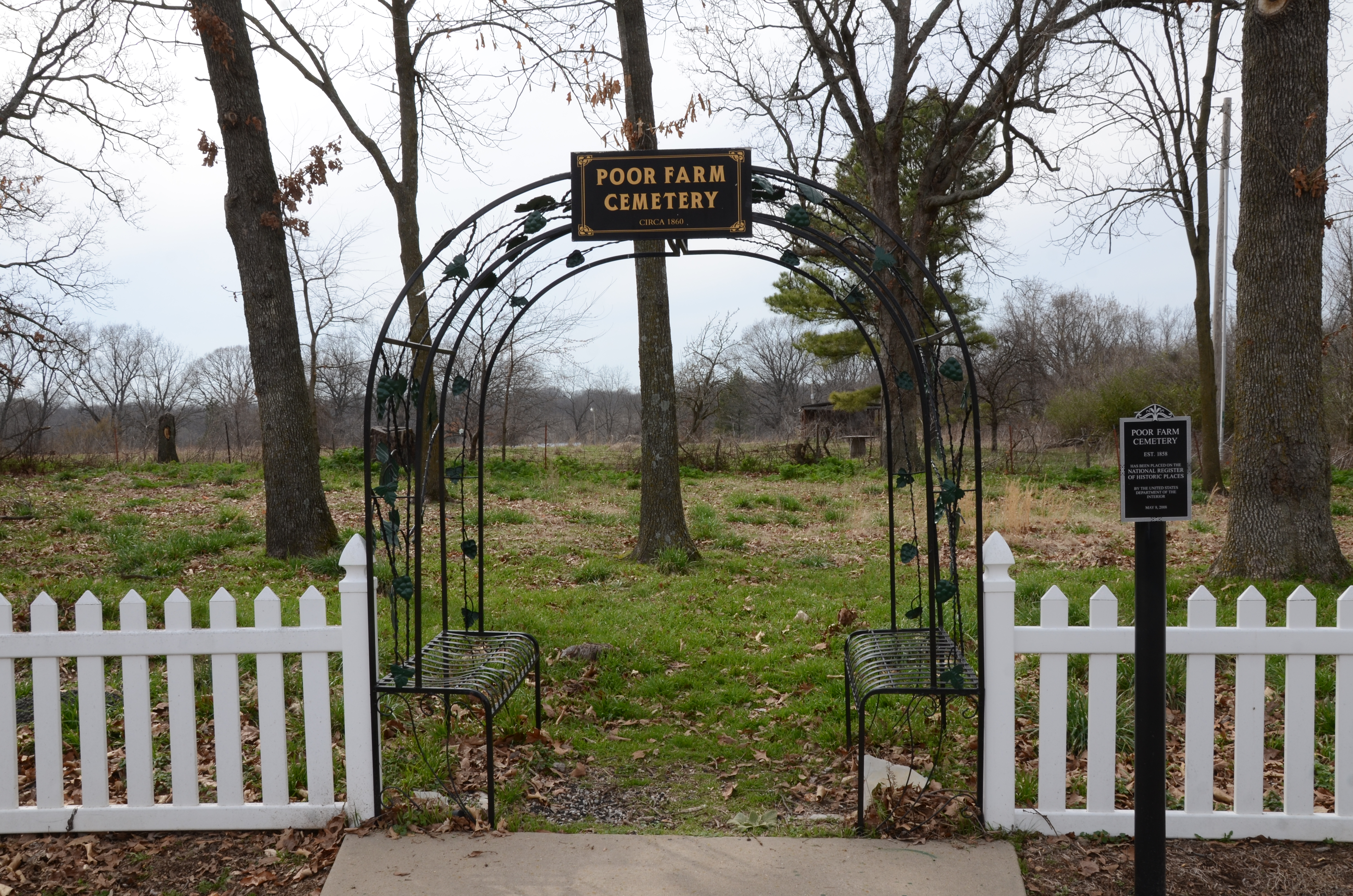
Benton County Poor Farm Cemetery in Bentonville, Benton County

- Oak Hill Cemetery, Siloam Springs
- Benton County Poor Farm Cemetery, Bentonville; NRHP-listed
- Mt. Hebron M.E. Church South and Cemetery, Colville; NRHP-listed
- Putman Cemetery, Bentonville; NRHP-listed

== Calhoun County ==
- Hampton Cemetery, Arkansas, Hampton; NRHP-listed

== Carroll County ==
- Carroll County Poor Farm Cemetery, near Pleasant Valley; NRHP-listed
- Eureka Springs Cemetery, Eureka Springs; NRHP-listed

== Chicot County ==
- Harden Family Cemetery, near Jennie; NRHP-listed
- New Hope Missionary Baptist Church Cemetery, Lake Village; NRHP-listed

== Clark County ==
- Rose Hill Cemetery, Arkadelphia; NRHP-listed

== Clay County ==
- County Home Cemetery, Piggott; NRHP-listed
- Scatterville Cemetery, near Rector; NRHP-listed

== Cleburne County ==
- Cleburne County Farm Cemetery, Heber Springs; NRHP-listed
- Mike Meyer Disfarmer Gravesite, Heber Springs; NRHP-listed

== Conway County ==
- Bold Pilgrim Cemetery, Morrilton; NRHP-listed

== Crawford County ==
- Fairview Cemetery, Van Buren; NRHP-listed

== Dallas County ==
- Hampton Springs Cemetery, near Carthage; NRHP-listed
- Princeton Cemetery, Princeton; NRHP-listed
- Tulip Cemetery, Tulip; NRHP-listed

== Desha County ==
- Mound Cemetery, Arkansas City; NRHP-listed
- Trippe Holly Grove Cemetery, McGehee; NRHP-listed

== Drew County ==
- Rough and Ready Cemetery, near Monticello; NRHP-listed
- Saline Cemetery, Allis; NRHP-listed

== Faulkner County ==
- Hardy Cemetery, Centerville; NRHP-listed
- Oak Grove Cemetery, Conway; NRHP-listed

== Franklin County ==
- Singleton Family Cemetery, Charleston; NRHP-listed

== Garland County ==
- Belding-Gaines Cemetery, near Hot Springs; NRHP-listed
- Buckville Cemetery, near Hot Springs; NRHP-listed
- Hollywood Cemetery, Hot Springs; NRHP-listed
- Friendship Cemetery (Hot Springs, Arkansas) Friendship Cemetery, Hot Springs; HRHP-listed

== Hempstead County ==
- Mounds Cemetery, Columbus; NRHP-listed

== Hot Springs County ==
- Rockport Cemetery, Rockport; NRHP-listed

== Howard County ==
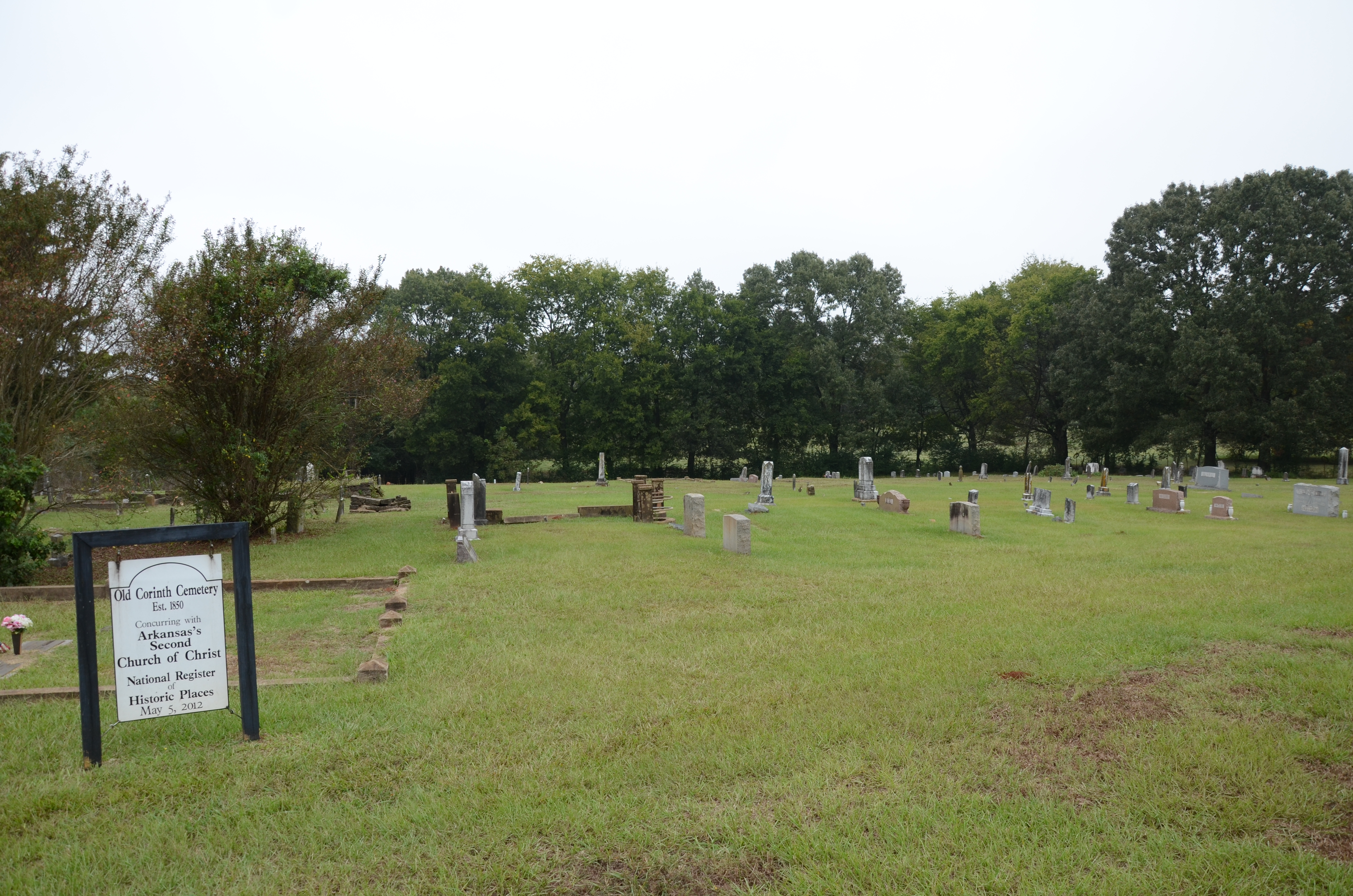
Old Corinth Cemetery, near Center Point, Howard County

- Old Corinth Cemetery, near Center Point; NRHP-listed

== Independence County ==
- Akron Cemetery, near Newark; NRHP-listed
- Walnut Grove Cemetery, Cord; NRHP-listed

== Izard County ==
- Jeffery Cemetery, near Mount Olive; NRHP-listed
- Vest Cemetery, near Boswell hamlet; NRHP-listed

== Jefferson County ==
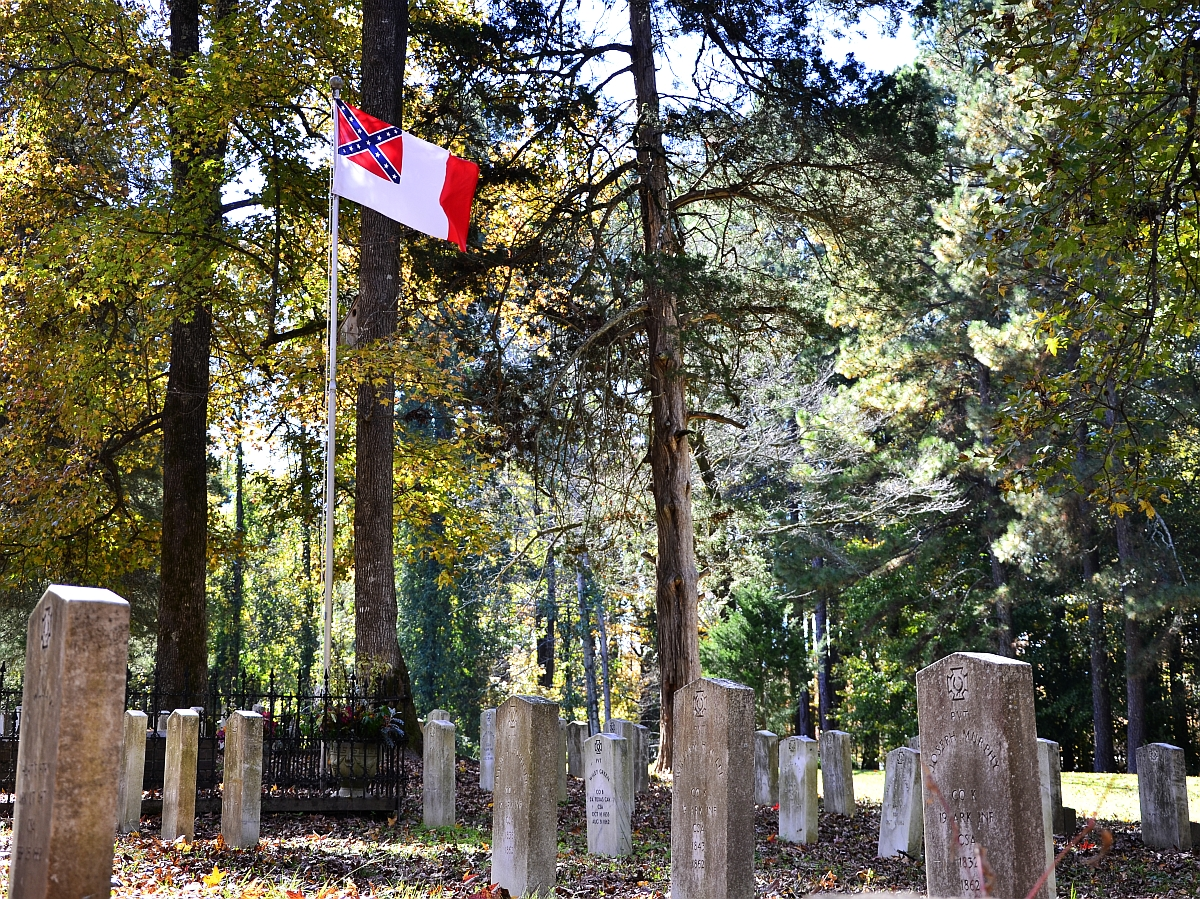
Camp White Sulphur Springs Confederate Cemetery, near Sulphur Springs, Jefferson County

- Antioch Missionary Baptist Church Cemetery, Sherrill; NRHP-listed
- Camp White Sulphur Springs Confederate Cemetery, near Sulphur Springs
- St. Peter's Cemetery, near Pine Bluff

== Lafayette County ==
- Conway Cemetery State Park, near Bradley; NRHP-listed

== Lawrence County ==
- Bethel Cemetery, near Denton; NRHP-listed
- Mount Zion Cemetery, Walnut Ridge; NRHP-listed
- Scott Cemetery, Walnut Ridge; NRHP-listed

== Lincoln County ==
- Rice Family Cemetery, Varner; NRHP-listed

== Little River County ==
- Mills Cemetery, Wilton; NRHP-listed

== Lonoke County ==
- Camp Nelson Confederate Cemetery, near Cabot; NRHP-listed
- Lonoke Cemetery, Lonoke

== Miller County ==
- Old Rondo Cemetery, Rondo; NRHP-listed

== Mississippi County ==
- Garden Point Cemetery, Etowah; NRHP-listed
- Violet Cemetery, Osceola; NRHP-listed

== Nevada County ==
- Ephesus Cemetery, Emmet; NRHP-listed
- Moscow Methodist Church and Cemetery, Prescott; NRHP-listed
- Prescott City Cemetery, Prescott; NRHP-listed

== Ouachita County ==
- Green Cemetery near Stephens; NRHP-listed
- Oakland Cemetery, Camden; NRHP-listed
- Purifoy Cemetery, Chidester

== Phillips County ==
- Helena Confederate Cemetery, Helena; NRHP-listed
- Maple Hill Cemetery, Helena; NRHP-listed
- Temple Beth El Cemetery, Helena; NRHP-listed

== Pope County ==
- Norristown Cemetery, Russellville; NRHP-listed

== Prairie County ==
- Oak Grove Cemetery, Des Arc; NRHP-listed

== Pulaski County ==
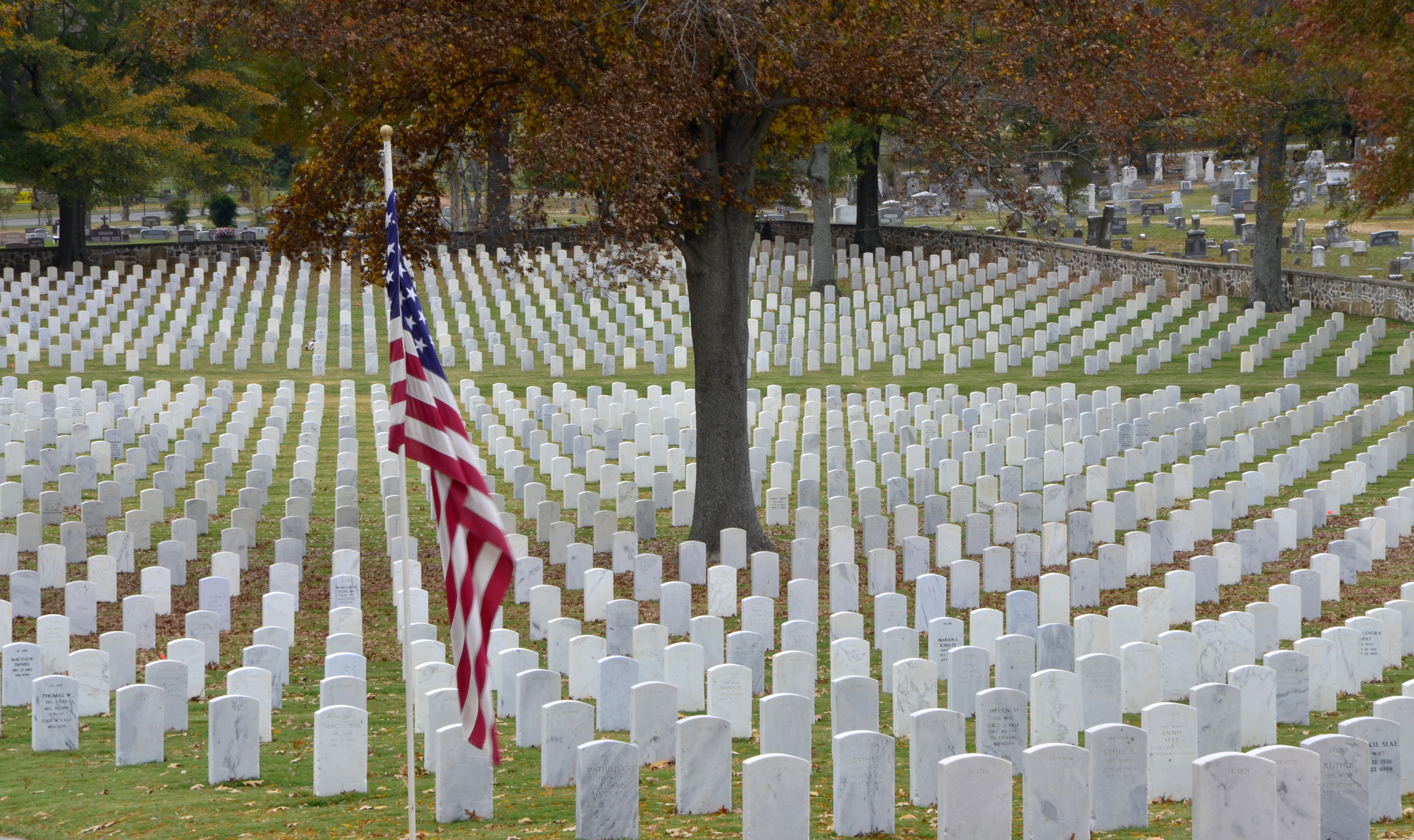
Little Rock National Cemetery in Little Rock, Pulaski County

- Frenchman's Mountain Methodist Episcopal Church-South and Cemetery, Cato; NRHP-listed
- Little Rock National Cemetery, Little Rock; NRHP-listed
- Martin Cemetery, Little Rock; NRHP-listed
- McCraw Cemetery, Jacksonville; NRHP-listed
- Mount Holly Cemetery, Little Rock; NRHP-listed
- Oakland-Fraternal Cemetery, Little Rock; NRHP-listed
- Pyeatte-Mason Cemetery, Maumelle; NRHP-listed

== Randolph County ==
- Campbell Cemetery, near Imboden; NRHP-listed

== Saint Francis County ==
- Forrest City Cemetery, Forrest City; NRHP-listed
- Scott Bond Family Plot, Madison; NRHP-listed

== Sebastian County ==
- Elmwood Cemetery, Fort Smith; NRHP-listed
- Fort Smith National Cemetery, Fort Smith; NRHP-listed
- Oak Cemetery, Fort Smith; NRHP-listed

== Sharp County ==
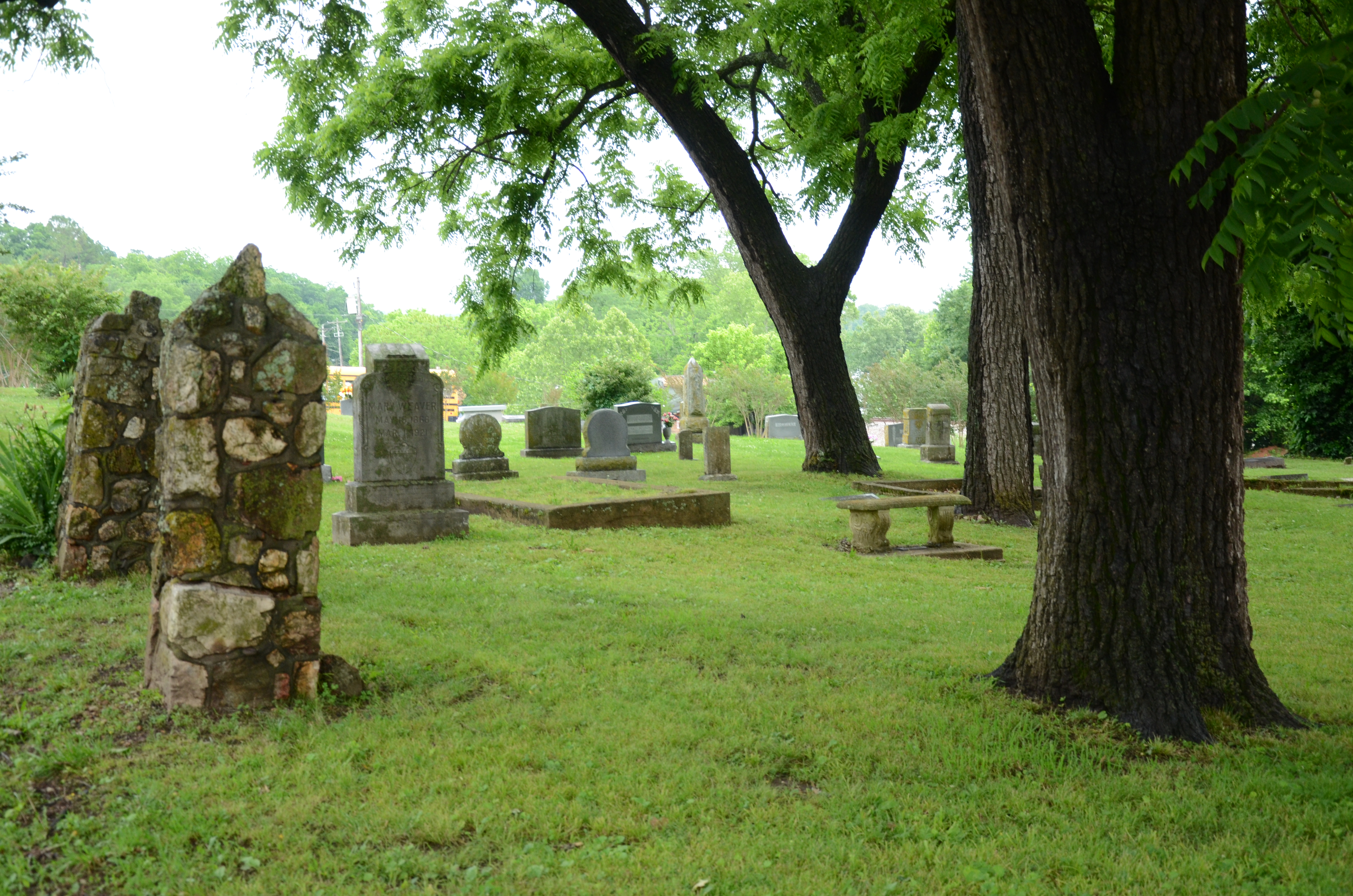
Hardy Cemetery in Hardy, Sharp County

- Hardy Cemetery, Hardy; NRHP-listed

== Union County ==
- Scotland Cemetery, near Junction City; NRHP-listed

== Washington County ==
- Bean Cemetery, Lincoln; NRHP-listed
- Bethlehem Cemetery, near Canehill; NRHP-listed
- Black Oak Cemetery, near Greenland; NRHP-listed
- Cane Hill Cemetery, Canehill; NRHP-listed
- Evergreen Cemetery, Fayetteville
- Fayetteville Confederate Cemetery, Fayetteville
- Fayetteville National Cemetery, Fayetteville; NRHP-listed
- Prairie Grove Cemetery, Prairie Grove; NRHP-listed
- Stokenbury Cemetery, Elkins; NRHP-listed
- Walker Family Plot, Fayetteville; NRHP-listed

== White County ==
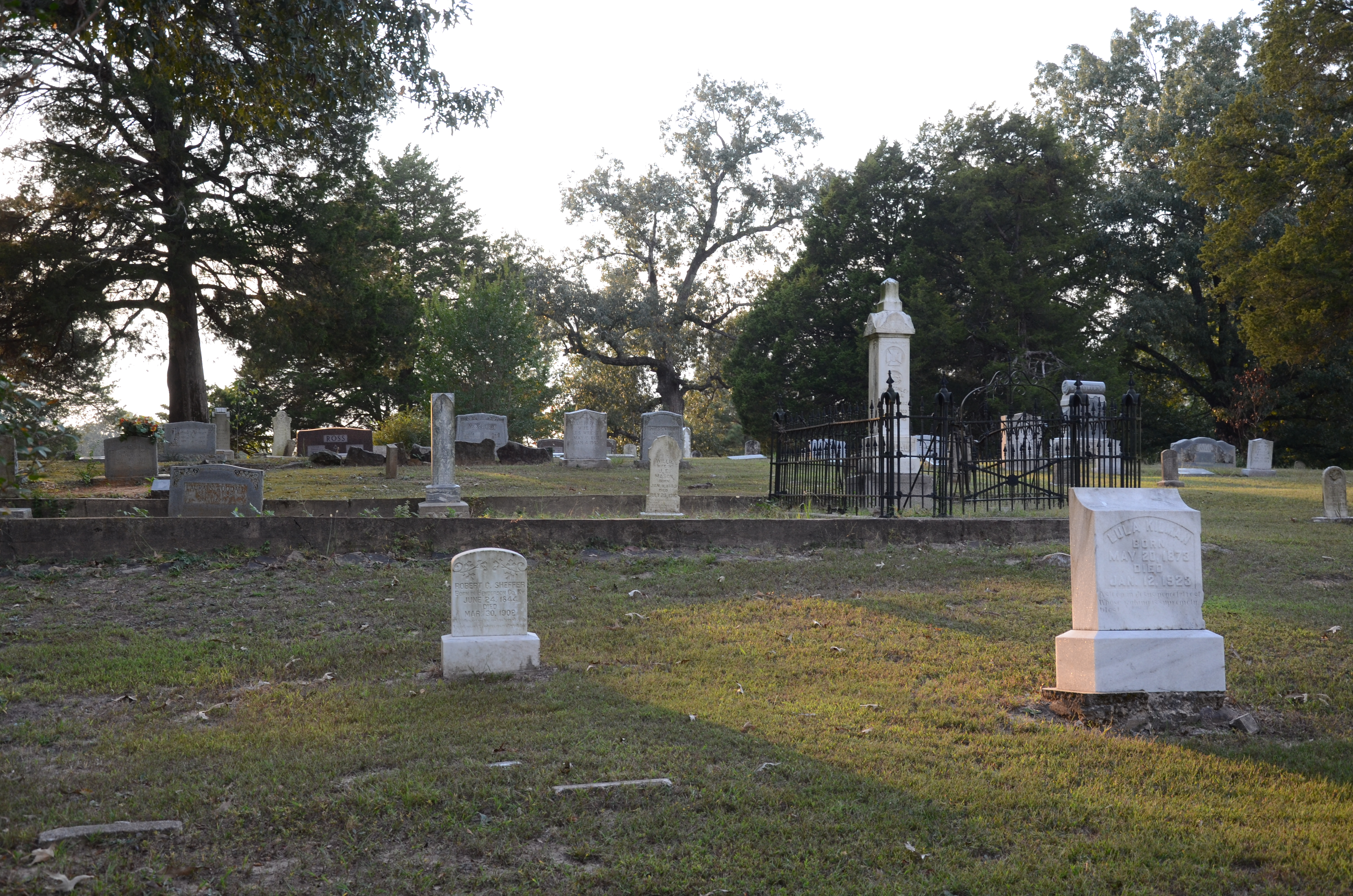
Fredonia Cemetery, White County

- Fredonia Cemetery; NRHP-listed
- Mount Olive-Bedford Chapel Cemetery, near Mount Vernon; NRHP-listed

== Woodruff County ==
- Augusta Memorial Park, Augusta; NRHP-listed

== Yell County ==
- Bata Mill Cemetery, New Neely
- Brearley Cemetery, Dardanelle
- Sulphur Springs Cemetery, Sulphur Springs; NRHP-listed

== See also ==
- List of cemeteries in the United States
- Pioneer cemetery
