= McCraw =

McCraw is a surname. Notable people with the surname include:

- John McCraw (1925–2014), New Zealand pedologist, academic and historian
- Kim McCraw (born c. 1969), Canadian film producer
- Louise Harrison McCraw (1893–1975), American writer and philanthropist
- Thomas K. McCraw (1940–2012), American historian
- Tommy McCraw (born 1940), American baseball player
- William McCraw (died 1955), Texas Attorney General and lawyer

== See also ==
- McCraw Glacier, a glacier of Antarctica
- McCraw Cemetery, a historic cemetery in Jacksonville, Arkansas, United States
- R. v. McCraw, a Supreme Court of Canada case about rape threats
