= Ephraim Pierce =

American politician

- Ambrotype of Pierce c. 1858

Member of the Minnesota House of Representatives from the 17th district
- In office December 2, 1857 – December 6, 1859 Serving with Albert Tuttle and Frederick Rehfeld

Personal details
- Born: c. 1834 North Chelsea, Massachusetts, U.S.
- Died: July 1, 1865 De Valls Bluff, Arkansas, U.S.
- Resting place: Little Rock National Cemetery; Little Rock, Arkansas, U.S.

Military service
- Allegiance: United States of America
- Branch/service: Union Army
- Years of service: 1861–1865
- Rank: Captain
- Unit: 3rd Minnesota Infantry Regiment
- Commands: Company F, 3rd Minnesota Infantry Regiment
- Battles/wars: American Civil War; Dakota War of 1862

Ephraim Pierce (c. 1834 – July 1, 1865), also was an American politician and soldier who served a single term in the Minnesota House of Representatives.

== Early life ==
Pierce was born around 1834 in North Chelsea, Massachusetts. Pierce eventually moved to Minnesota Territory and settled in St. Peter, Minnesota.

== Political career ==
Pierce was elected on October 13, 1857, to serve in the Minnesota House of Representatives representing the 17th House district. Pierce represented the 17th House district alongside representatives Albert Tuttle and Frederick Rehfeld. Pierce served during the 1st Minnesota Legislature, during his term he was a member of the judiciary committee and was the chairman of the public lands committee.

== Military service and death ==
During the American Civil War Pierce enlisted in the Union army on September 30, 1861, in Saint Paul, Minnesota.^{:127} Pierce was enrolled into the ranks of Company B of the 3rd Minnesota Infantry Regiment as a Sergeant.^{:127} Pierce was later commissioned as a Second Lieutenant in Company B of the 3rd Minnesota on May 12, 1863.^{:119} Pierce was promoted on June 14, 1864, to serve as the adjutant of the 3rd Minnesota.^{:116} Pierce was later promoted to the rank of Captain on April 17, 1865, and served as the commander of Company F of the 3rd Minnesota until his death.^{:120}^{:206}^{:281} Pierce died on July 1, 1865, in DeValls Bluff, Arkansas.^{:127} Pierce is buried in the Little Rock National Cemetery.
