= Albert Tuttle =

American politician

- Ambrotype of Tuttle c. 1858

Member of the Minnesota House of Representatives from the 17th District
- In office December 2, 1857 – December 6, 1859 Serving with Frederick Rehfeld and Ephraim Pierce

Personal details
- Born: July 23, 1807 Pennsylvania, U.S.
- Died: November 23, 1881 (aged 74) Home Township, Brown County, Minnesota, U.S.
- Resting place: New Ulm City Cemetery; New Ulm, Minnesota, U.S.

Albert Tuttle (July 23, 1807 – November 23, 1881) was an American politician and early citizen of New Ulm, Minnesota. Tuttle served as single term in the Minnesota House of Representatives.

== Early life ==
Tuttle was born on July 23, 1807^{:154} in Pennsylvania to parents Josiah Tuttle and Jerusha Tuttle (née Bingham).^{:153}^{:469-470} Tuttle moved to Minnesota Territory and settled in New Ulm, Minnesota on July 3, 1855.^{:469} Tuttle worked in New Ulm as a farmer.^{:469}

== Political career ==
Tuttle was elected to the Minnesota House of Representatives to represent Minnesota's 17th House district (Brown County and Nicollet County) on October 13, 1857. Tuttle's residence at the time was listed as Milford Township. Tuttle served during the 1st Minnesota Legislature, during his term he was a member of the agriculture and manufactures committee. Tuttle also served as a county commissioner for Brown County.^{:154}

== Later life and death ==
Tuttle's son William was killed by the Dakota people on August 19, 1862, during the Dakota War of 1862, he was part of a scouting party.^{:507} Tuttle died at his residence near Home Township at the age of 74 on Wednesday November 23, 1881. Tuttle is buried in the New Ulm City Cemetery.^{:154}

== Personal life ==
Tuttle was married to Delight Horton.^{:154}^{:469} Tuttle's daughter Esther was married to Henry Behnke in 1857.^{:469} Behnke was the militia courier who alerted Charles Eugene Flandrau at St. Peter, Minnesota to help New Ulm during the Battles of New Ulm.^{:166}
