= Reasons of the Supreme Court of Canada by Justice Cory =

This is a list of opinions written by Peter Cory, during his time as a Puisne Justice of the Supreme Court of Canada between 1 February 1989 and 1 June 1999.

== 1989–1999 ==
- R v Storrey, [1990] 1 S.C.R. 241
- R v Askov, [1990] 2 S.C.R. 1199
- R v McCraw, [1991] 3 S.C.R. 72
- Canadian Council of Churches v Canada (Minister of Employment and Immigration), [1992] 1 S.C.R. 236
- Rodriguez v British Columbia (Attorney General) [1993] (dissent)
- R v Daviault, [1994] 3 S.C.R. 63
- R v Heywood, 1994
- R v Stillman, [1997] 1 S.C.R. 607
- Vriend v Alberta, [1998] 1 S.C.R. 493 (with Iacobucci)
- M v H, [1999] 2 S.C.R. 3 (with Iacobucci)
- Dobson (Litigation guardian of) v Dobson, [1999] 2 S.C.R. 753

Note: This list is incomplete
