= John H. Yancey =

American military personnel

John Howard Yancey
- Born: April 27, 1918; Plumerville, Arkansas, US
- Died: May 16, 1986 (aged 68); Little Rock, Arkansas, US
- Burial place: Little Rock National Cemetery
- Military career
- Allegiance: United States
- Branch: United States Marine Corps
- Service years: 1942–1952
- Rank: Captain
- Units: 15th Infantry Battalion, C Company (USMCR); 1st Marine Division; 2nd Battalion, 7th Marines, E Company
- Conflicts: World War II; *Battle of Guadalcanal; *Battle of Iwo Jima; Korean War; *Battle of Chosin Reservoir; *Battle of Hill 698; *Battle of Hill 1282
- Awards: Navy Cross x 2 Silver Star; Bronze Star; Purple Heart x 3 Combat Action Ribbon x 2

John Howard Yancey (27 April 1918 – 16 May 1986) was a highly decorated United States Marine Corps combat veteran of World War II and the Korean War. He received two Navy Crosses, a Silver Star, a Bronze Star, and three Purple Hearts.

== Early life ==
Yancey was born on 27 April 1918 in Plumerville, Arkansas. He graduated from Little Rock Central High School and then attended Ouachita College, but left school before graduating in 1942 to join the Marine Corps at the outbreak of World War II.

== Military career ==
=== World War II ===
Yancey was assigned to the Marine Raiders in World War II and became the bodyguard to Lieutenant Colonel Evans Carlson, the commander of the 2nd Marine Raider Battalion. In November 1942, during the Guadalcanal Campaign in the Solomon Islands, Yancey's leadership in a strategic battle earned him the Navy Cross and a battlefield commission to lieutenant. He also served in the Battle of Iwo Jima.

After World War II, he served in the Marine Corps Reserve unit in Little Rock (at the time Company C of the 15th Infantry Battalion) until he was called to active service in the summer of 1950.

=== Korean War ===
At the onset of the Korean War, Yancey's unit was ordered to active duty and then absorbed among many units across the 1st Marine Division fighting the war. By Aug 11, 1950, he was transferred to the Training and Replacement Regiment at Camp Pendleton, CA and then subsequently reassigned to Company E, 2nd Battalion, 7th Marines (2/7).

With 2/7, he fought in the Battle of Chosin Reservoir, where he earned his second Navy Cross and a Silver Star. On 4 November 1950, Lieutenant Yancey led 2nd Platoon, Company E, 2/7 in the assault on Hill 698, a key position in the Chinese defenses near Sudong, North Korea. After close combat with grenades and small arms, his platoon took the hill, and held it after a fierce counterattack. On 27–28 November 1950, Lieutenant Yancey led his platoon in the defense of Hill 1282, which resulted in fierce hand-to-hand combat. During the Battle of Hill 1282, Yancey continued to lead his Marines, despite being severely wounded. Lt Yancey found himself as an infantry platoon leader at the Chosin Reservoir. Chinese forces sought to overwhelm his unit on critical high ground at Yudam-ni. Yancey led his platoon in hand-to-hand combat through the sub-zero night. A grenade exploded near him, lodging a piece of shrapnel in the roof of his mouth. A bullet tore through his nose. A second bullet pierced his right cheek, knocking out his teeth, popping his eye out of the socket, and lodging in the back of his neck. Yancey remained in the fight until he lost so much blood he couldn't move and could no longer see. For his awe-inspiring determination and fighting spirit, Yancey was nominated for the Medal of Honor. All his senior officers were killed at Chosin Reservoir, and no one could write an official report of his actions that night. He eventually wound up receiving his second Navy Cross.

=== Post-Korean War ===
After having received severe wounds in Korea, then-First Lieutenant Yancey was treated at US Naval Hospital Yokosuka, Japan. His story was re-told by a fellow officer there and the recording is held at the national archives. Eventually, he returned to his home in Little Rock, Arkansas where he was promoted to captain and assigned as the commanding officer of the Marine Reserve unit in Little Rock under the new designation of the 6th Rifle Company, 8th Marine Corps District.

=== Vietnam War ===
Captain Yancey attempted to return to service as an executive officer during the Vietnam War, however, the Marine Corps denied Captain Yancey a return to service on account of his battle wounds leaving him nearly without teeth; to which he responded "Hell, I wasn't planning on biting the sonsofbitches to death."

== Awards and honors ==
A Marine Corps League Detachment in Dallas, Texas was named after him.

=== First Navy Cross citation ===
Citation:

The President of the United States of America takes pleasure in presenting the Navy Cross to Corporal John Yancey (MCSN: 335303), United States Marine Corps Reserve, for extraordinary heroism and devotion to duty while serving with Company F, SECOND Marine Raider Battalion in combat against enemy Japanese forces on the upper Lunga River, Guadalcanal, Solomon Islands, on 30 November 1942. Leading his squad into a hostile bivouac, Corporal Yancey surprised over a hundred of the enemy, and although vastly outnumbered, he charged into the group, his automatic weapon blasting. Following his daring example, his squad completely overwhelmed the Japanese, killing over fifty and driving the remainder into the bush. By his swift and courageous action, he won a complete victory over the enemy without the loss of a Marine. His great personal valor and outstanding leadership were in keeping with the highest traditions of the United States Naval Service.

=== Second Navy Cross citation ===
Citation:

The President of the United States of America takes pleasure in presenting a Gold Star in lieu of a Second Award of the Navy Cross to First Lieutenant John Yancey (MCSN: 0-36570), United States Marine Corps Reserve, for extraordinary heroism in connection with military operations against an armed enemy of the United Nations while serving as a Platoon Leader of Company E, Second Battalion, Seventh Marines, FIRST Marine Division (Reinforced), in action against enemy aggressor forces in the Republic of Korea on 27 and 28 November 1950. With his company subjected to a savage and sustained night attack by an enemy force of approximately two battalions while defending strategic high ground north of Yudam-ni, and with adjacent platoon positions infiltrated by hostile troops, First Lieutenant Yancey bravely rushed into the thick of the fighting in a daring attempt to rally the men and seal the gap in the lines. Although wounded by an enemy bullet which penetrated his cheek and lodged in his neck, he led the Marines through snow and sub-zero temperatures in a fierce hand-to-hand encounter with the hostile force, drove off the attackers and quickly reorganized the unit. Learning that his company commander had been killed, Lieutenant Yancey unhesitatingly assumed command and boldly made his way from one platoon to another in the face of intense enemy fire, shouting words of encouragement to the men, seeking aid for the casualties and directing the defense of the vital terrain. Despite two further wounds sustained during the intensive action, he gallantly refused to be evacuated and continued to lead his company in repelling the hostile attacks until, weakened by loss of blood and no longer able to see, he was forced to accept medical aid. By his inspiring leadership, outstanding courage and unwavering devotion to duty in the face of overwhelming odds, First Lieutenant Yancey was directly instrumental in the successful defense of the area and upheld the highest traditions of the United States Naval Service.

== Burial ==
He is buried at the Little Rock National Cemetery.
