= Little Rock Confederate Memorial =

- U.S. National Register of Historic Places
- U.S. Historic district – Contributing property
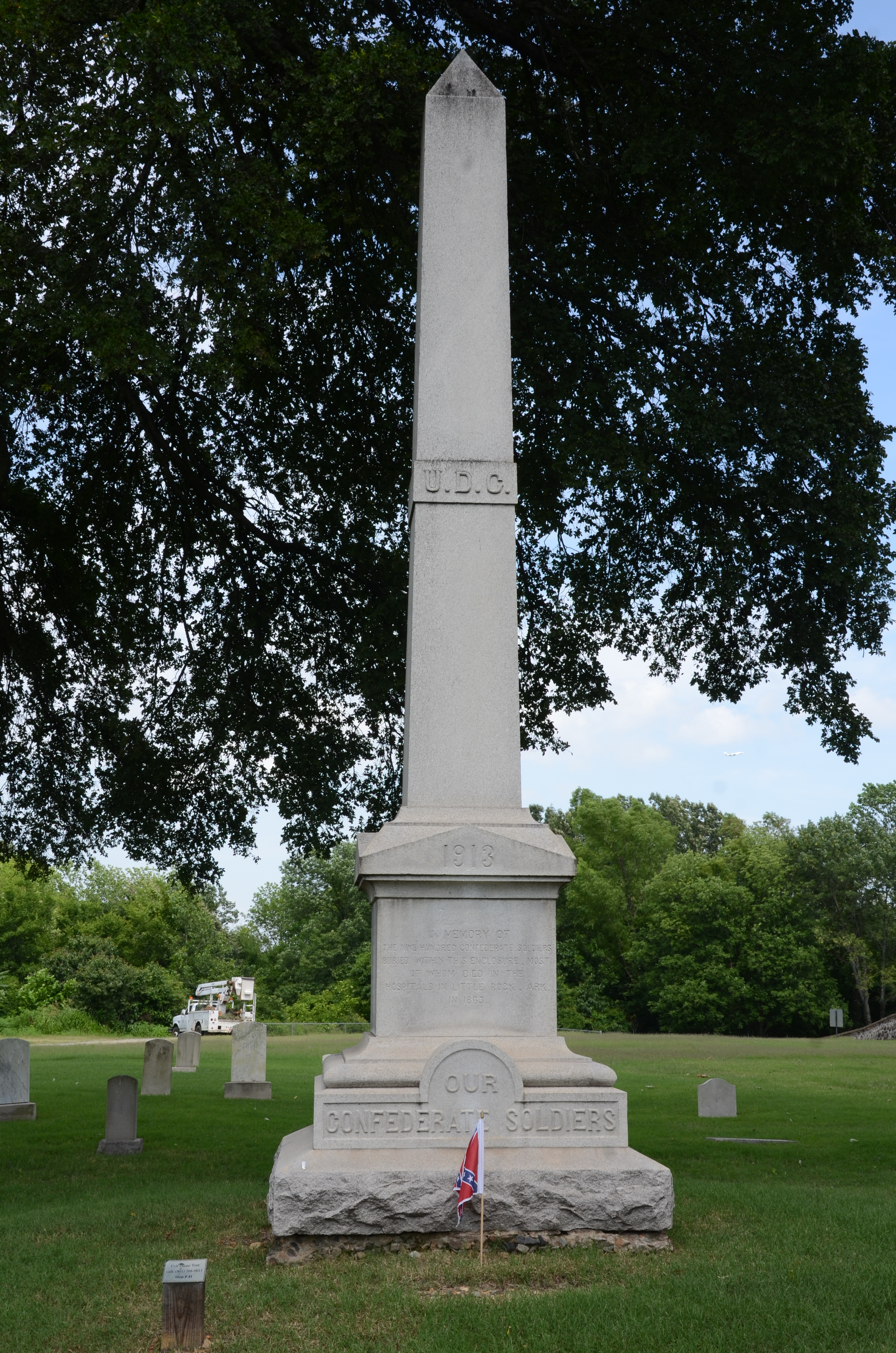

- Location within Arkansas Location within the United States
- Location: Little Rock National Cemetery, jct. of 21st and Barber Sts., Little Rock, Arkansas
- Coordinates: 34.7240148°N 092.2559899°W
- Area: less than one acre
- Built: 1913
- Architectural style: Classical Revival
- Part of: Little Rock National Cemetery (ID96001496)
- MPS: Civil War Commemorative Sculpture MPS
- NRHP reference No.: 96000499

Significant dates
- Added to NRHP: May 3, 1996
- Designated CP: December 20, 1996

The Little Rock Confederate Memorial is a stone memorial marker in Little Rock National Cemetery, Little Rock, Arkansas. Set in an overflow area of the cemetery on 21st and Barber Streets, it is a granite obelisk, mounted in a concrete base, measuring 18 feet (5.5 m) in height and a square base 67 inches (1.7 m) per side. Midway up the west side of the obelisk "U.D.C." is inscribed, with "1913" at the base of that side. Inscriptions on the sides of the base commemorate fallen Confederate Army soldiers. It was placed in 1913, paid for by the local chapter of the United Daughters of the Confederacy. The ceremony marked the first time that the federal government formally took charge of a former Confederate military cemetery.

The memorial was listed on the National Register of Historic Places in 1996.

== See also ==
- National Register of Historic Places listings in Little Rock, Arkansas
