= Forrest City Cemetery =

Cemetery in Arkansas, US

- U.S. National Register of Historic Places
- Location: SFC Rd. 702, south of U.S. Route 70, west of Margaret Dr., east of Union Pacific RR, Forrest City, St. Francis County, Arkansas, United States
- Coordinates: 35.00869°N 90.77196°W
- Built: c. 1880
- NRHP reference No.: 100007000
- Added to NRHP: September 21, 2021

Forrest City Cemetery, also known as City Colored Cemetery and Purifoy Cemetery, is a historic Black burial ground in Forrest City, Arkansas, United States. It is thought that this burial ground was founded around c. 1880, by members of the Spring Creek Baptist Church. The last burials here were in the 1960s, and over time it became overgrown and abandoned. It was rediscovered in 2012, and contains the burial sites for several prominent early African American leaders and politicians.

Notable burials include Josiah Homer Blount (1860–1938), the first Black person to run for governor of the state of Arkansas in 1920. R. A. Williams, founder of the Supreme Royal Circle of Friends, and Wallace Leon Purifoy, principal at "Colored High School" in Forrest City and founder of the Black fraternity the Imperial Council of Jugamos are also buried at this cemetery.

It is listed on the National Register of Historic Places since 2021.

== See also ==
- List of cemeteries in Arkansas
- National Register of Historic Places listings in St. Francis County, Arkansas
