= Fredonia Cemetery =

Historic cemetery in Arkansas, United States

- Fredonia Cemetery Historic Section
- U.S. National Register of Historic Places
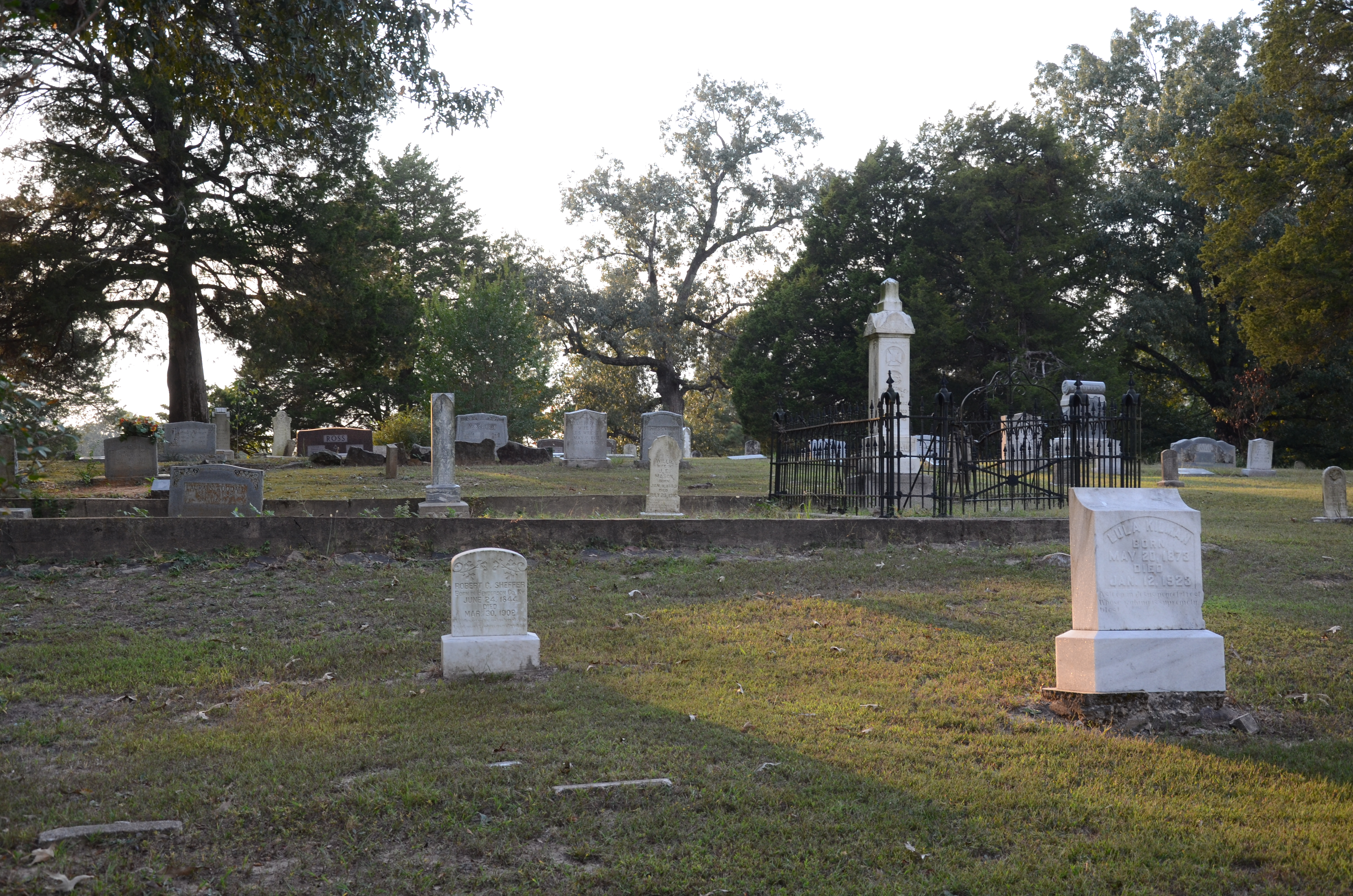

- Location within Arkansas Location within the United States
- Nearest city: Stevens Creek, Arkansas
- Coordinates: 35°23′12″N 91°37′34″W
- Area: 1 acre (0.40 ha)
- Built: 1839
- MPS: White County MPS
- NRHP reference No.: 06001312
- Added to NRHP: January 29, 2007

Fredonia Cemetery, also known as Holly Grove Cemetery and Stevens Creek Cemetery, is a cemetery in rural White County, Arkansas, northwest of Bald Knob on Fredonia Road. The oldest portion of the cemetery houses marked graves with the oldest dating to 1870, and is estimated to contain at least 300 unmarked graves. The cemetery houses many of the area's early settlers.

The historic portion of the cemetery was listed on the National Register of Historic Places in 2007.

== See also ==
- National Register of Historic Places listings in White County, Arkansas
