= Mt. Hebron M.E. Church South and Cemetery =

Historic church in Arkansas, United States

- U.S. National Register of Historic Places
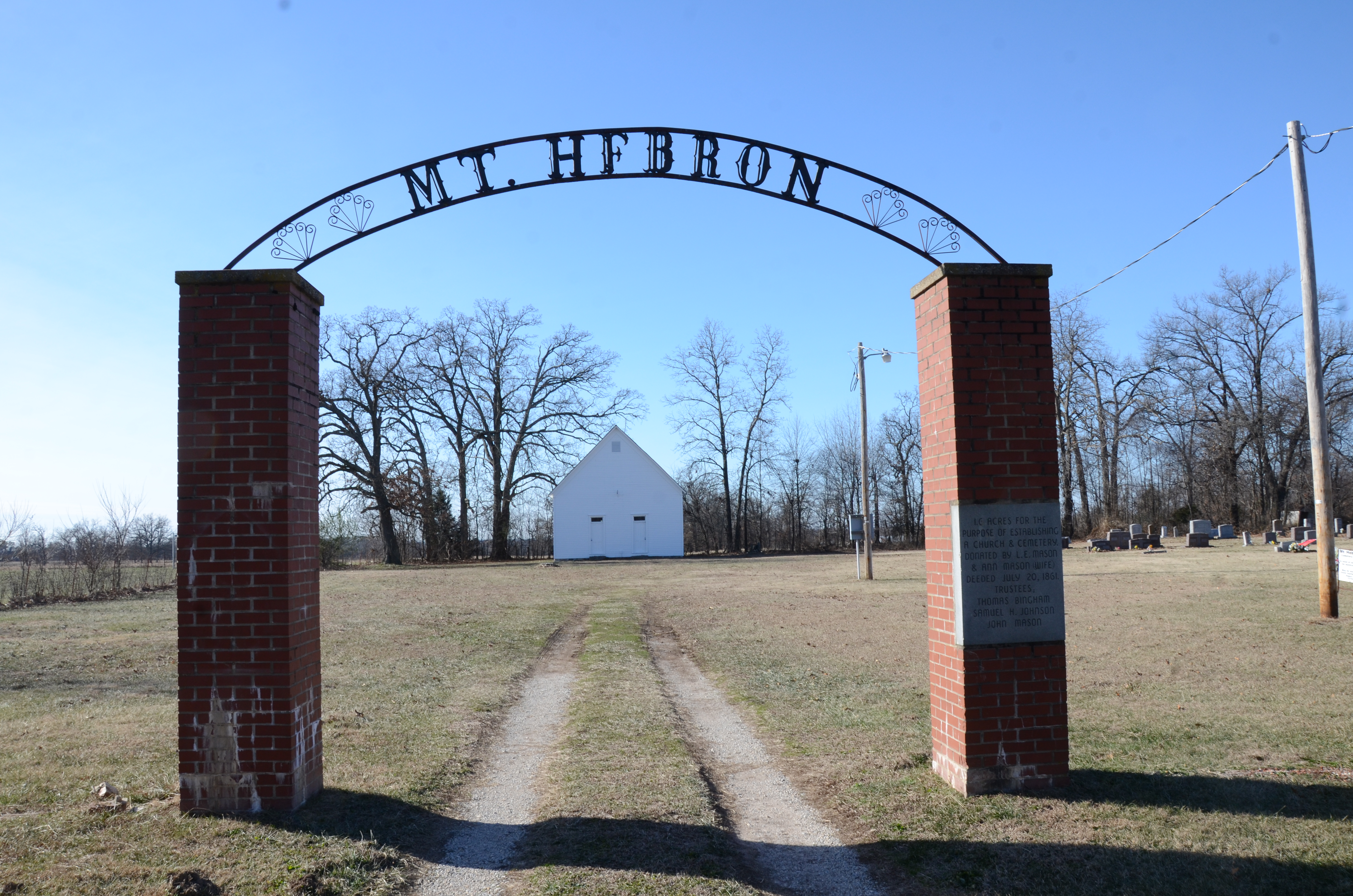

- Location within Arkansas Location within the United States
- Location: 1079 Mt. Hebron Rd., Colville, Arkansas
- Coordinates: 36°16′33″N 94°11′43″W
- Area: 3 acres (1.2 ha)
- Built: 1872
- Architectural style: Plain/traditional
- MPS: Benton County MRA
- NRHP reference No.: 03000958
- Added to NRHP: September 27, 2003

The Mt. Hebron M.E. Church South and Cemetery is a historic Methodist church and cemetery, located at 1079 Mt. Hebron Road in Colville, Arkansas, United States. The church is a simple traditional wood-frame church, built in 1904 for a congregation established in 1872. The adjacent cemetery also recorded its first burial that year. The church played a significant role in the growth and development of the community in the 19th century.

The property was listed on the National Register of Historic Places in 2003.

== See also ==
- National Register of Historic Places listings in Benton County, Arkansas
