= Old Corinth Cemetery =

Historic cemetery in Arkansas, United States

- U.S. National Register of Historic Places
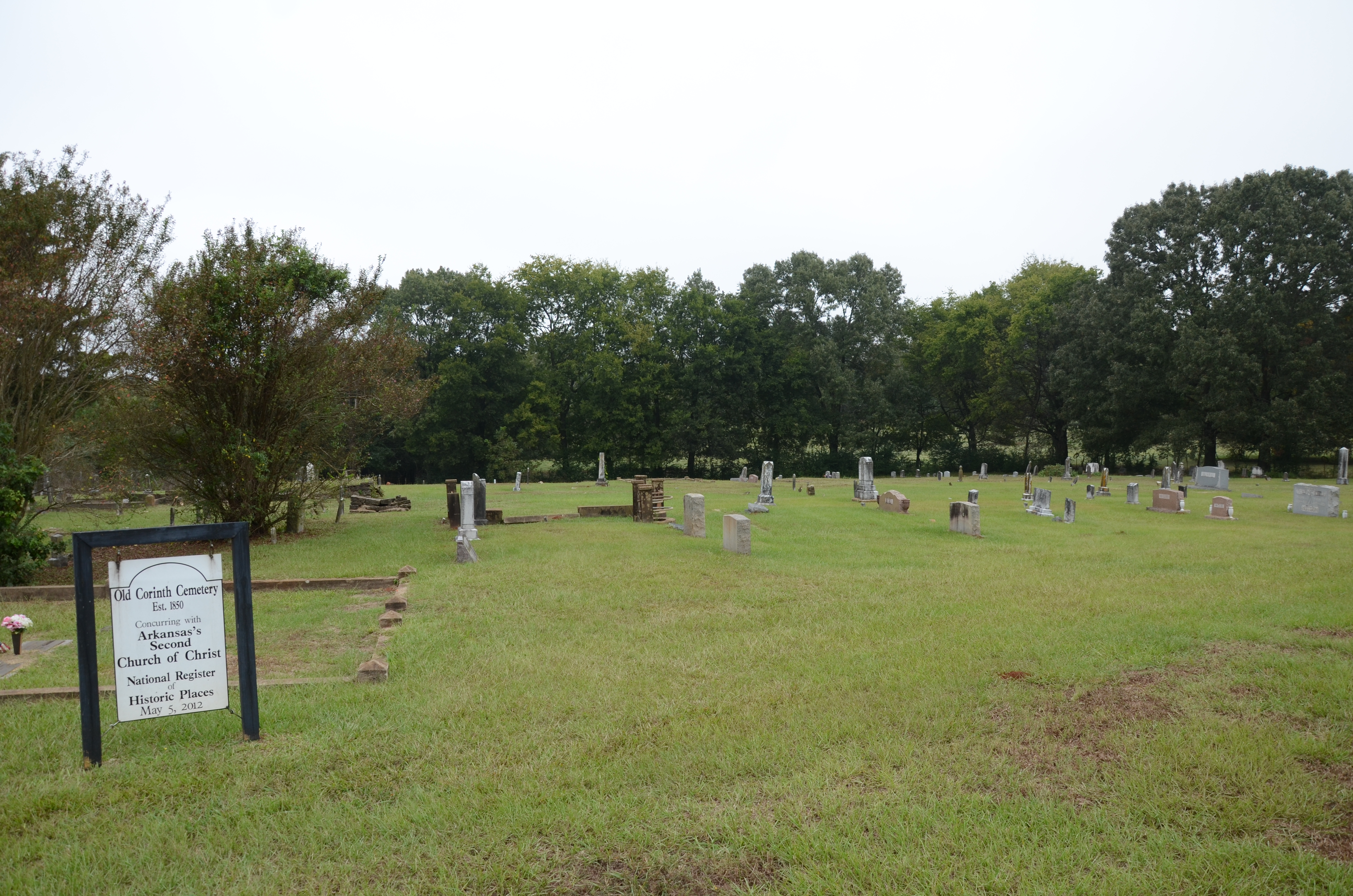

- Location within Arkansas Location within the United States
- Location: Arkansas Highway 26 near Center Point, Arkansas
- Coordinates: 34°2′39″N 93°50′24″W
- Area: 0.17 acres (0.069 ha)
- NRHP reference No.: 12000022
- Added to NRHP: May 11, 2012

The Old Corinth Cemetery is a historic cemetery in rural Howard County, Arkansas. It is small, just 0.17 acres (0.069 ha), and is located about 5 miles (8.0 km) north of Nashville on Arkansas Highway 26. The cemetery is the only surviving element of the community of Corinth. Originally known as Wilton, the area was settled in the 1840s, with a post office established in 1849. The town was renamed Corinth in 1885, after the local church (no longer extant) which stood next to the cemetery. The area's population declined in the early 20th century, and the town was entirely taken over by peach orchards, leaving only the cemetery behind. The last burial was in 2000, although the majority of burials predate 1961.

The cemetery was listed on the National Register of Historic Places in 2012.

== See also ==
- National Register of Historic Places listings in Howard County, Arkansas
