= Louise Harrison McCraw =

American novelist

Louise Harrison McCraw (February 1893 – January 25, 1975) was an American writer and philanthropist. She was the founding director of the Braille Circulating Library of Richmond, Virginia.

McCraw was a native of Buckingham County, Virginia, the daughter of Emmett and Bettie McCraw. As a child she wanted to be a writer, and by eleven she had begun sending her work to the children's page of the Richmond Times-Dispatch; several of her stories were published. She graduated from the Women's College of Richmond in 1911 and moved home to Buckingham County to teach school. A devout Presbyterian, she returned to Richmond in the 1920s to become secretary of the Excelsior Band. She lived with her sister Bessie in a Richmond boarding house at this time.

McCraw was a great admirer of the work of Presbyterian writer James H. McConkey, and after she heard him speak in Richmond she suggested that he publish his work in braille. Together the couple established the Braille Circulating Library in 1925; its first headquarters were in McCraw's rented room. The library was funded entirely by private donations and consisted mainly of evangelical Christian literature. By 1951 McCraw was sending books, free, to nearly 1,800 borrowers both in the United States and in eighteen countries.

McCraw began publishing novels in 1936. All of her fiction dealt with Christian themes; she also penned a biography of McConkey. She was named secretary emerita of the Braille Circulating Library in 1969 after her retirement. McCraw was named one of the Virginia Women in History by the Library of Virginia in 2017.

== List of works ==
- 1934: Starward
- 1936: Hearts That Understand
- 1937: Glorious Triumph
- 1938: Blue Skies
- 1939: with William McConkey, James H. McConkey, A Man of God
- 1940: Shining After Rain
- 1941: Does God Answer Prayer?
- 1942: Nest Among the Stars
- 1943: On the Wings of the Morning
- 1945: Not All That Glitters
- 1946: Crystal Sea
- 1952: The Honor of Preston Reed
- 1961: My Heart’s at Liberty
- 1965: It Shall be Forever
