= Prairie Grove Cemetery =

Historic cemetery in Arkansas, United States

- Prairie Grove Cemetery, Historic Section
- U.S. National Register of Historic Places
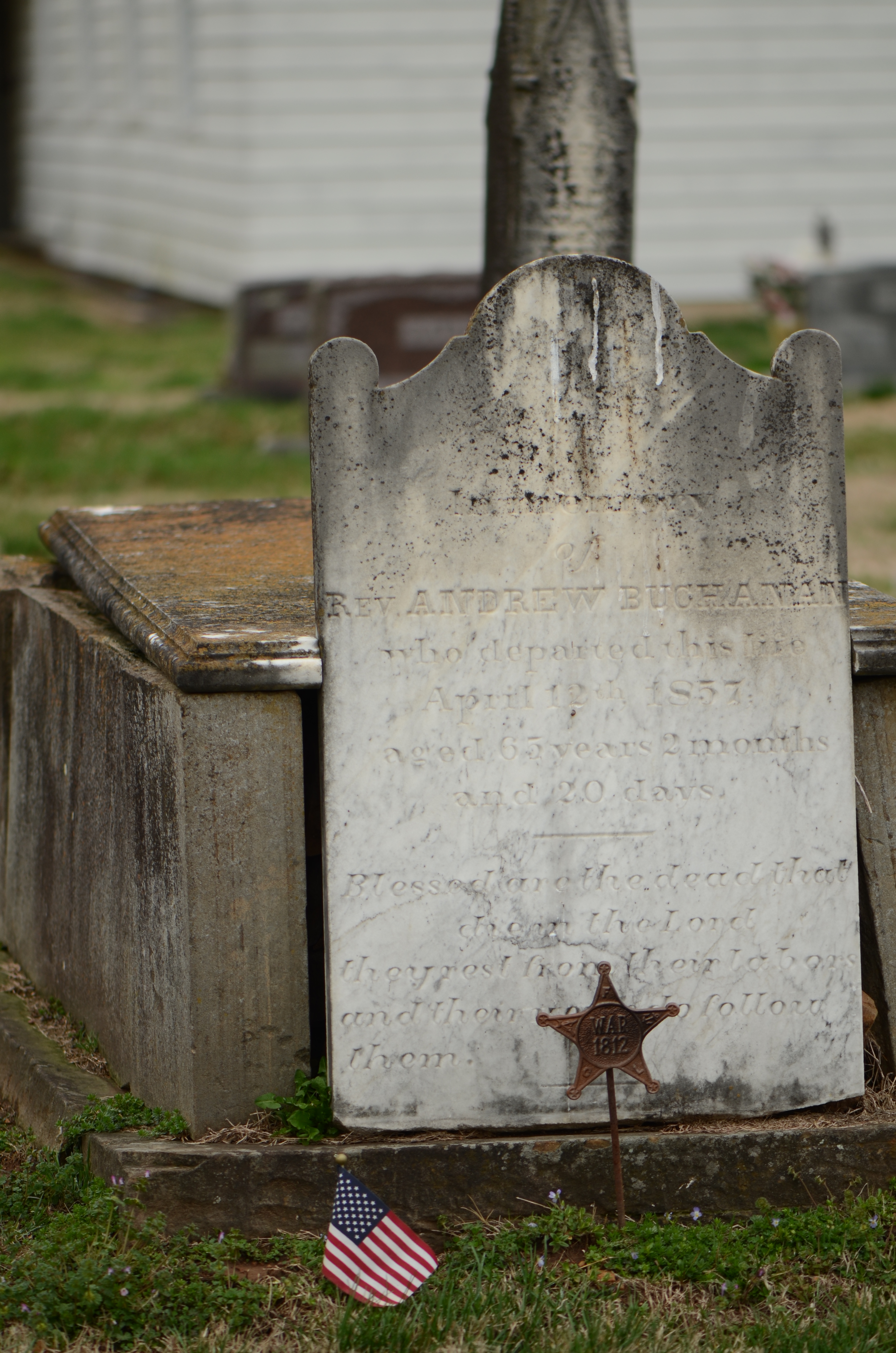
- Grave marker for Reverend Andrew Buchanan, a veteran, taken 2016

- Location within Arkansas Location within the United States
- Location: Bounded by Kate Smith, W. Buchanan, & Parks Sts., Prairie Grove, Arkansas
- Coordinates: 35°58′34″N 94°19′8″W
- Area: 2.2 acres (0.89 ha)
- Built: 1818
- NRHP reference No.: 15000292
- Added to NRHP: January 8, 2016

The Prairie Grove Cemetery is a historic cemetery on West Buchanan and Kate Smith Streets in Prairie Grove, Washington County, Arkansas. Located just west of downtown Prairie Grove, the cemetery is the burial ground for many of the area's early settlers, with the oldest known burial occurring in 1818. It has more than 3,000 interments, and continues in active use. It is owned and maintained by a private not-for-profit cemetery association.

The historic portion of the cemetery (about 2.2 acres (0.89 ha) of its eastern half) was listed on the National Register of Historic Places in 2016.

== Gallery ==
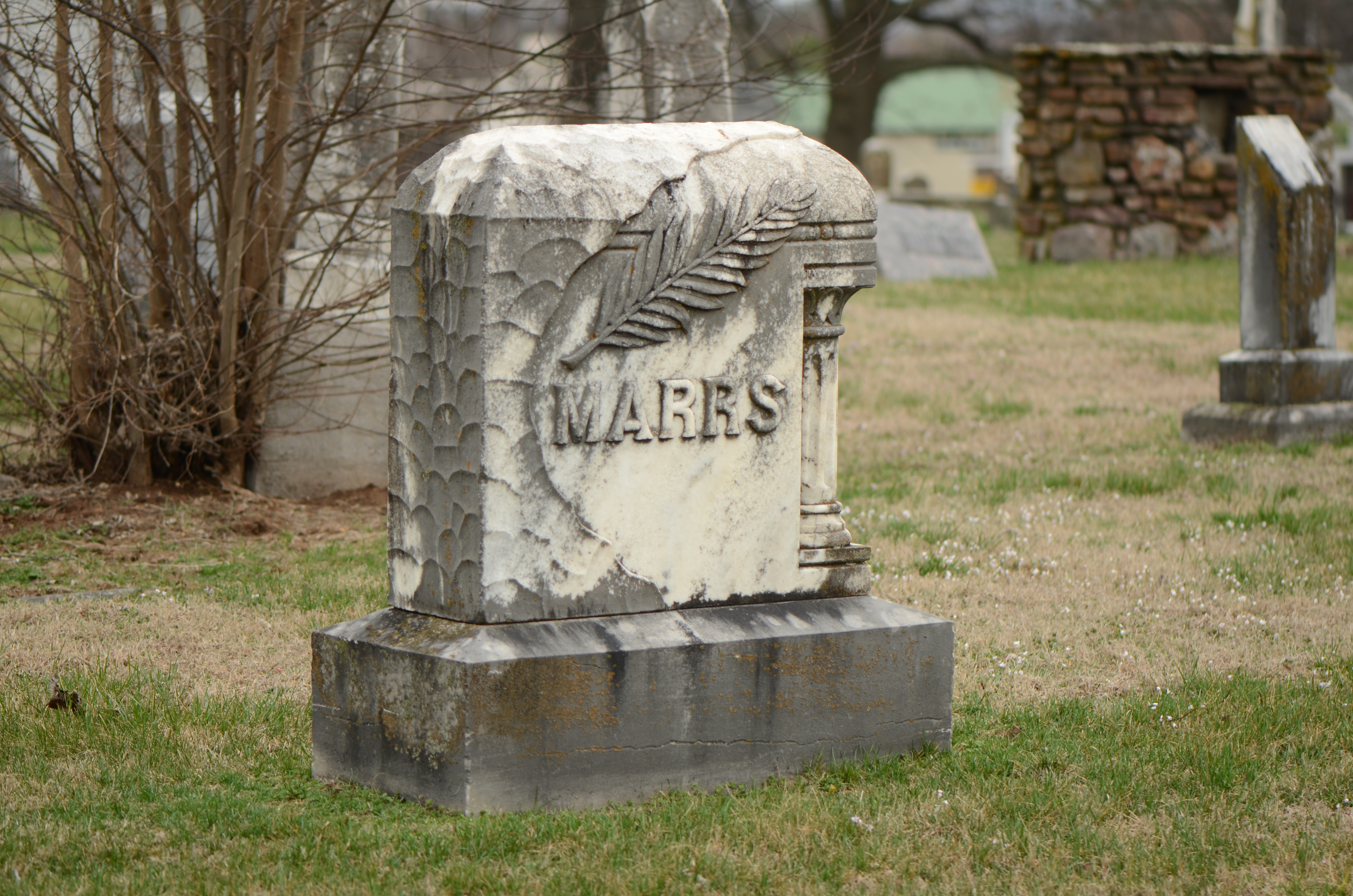
Headstone, taken 2016

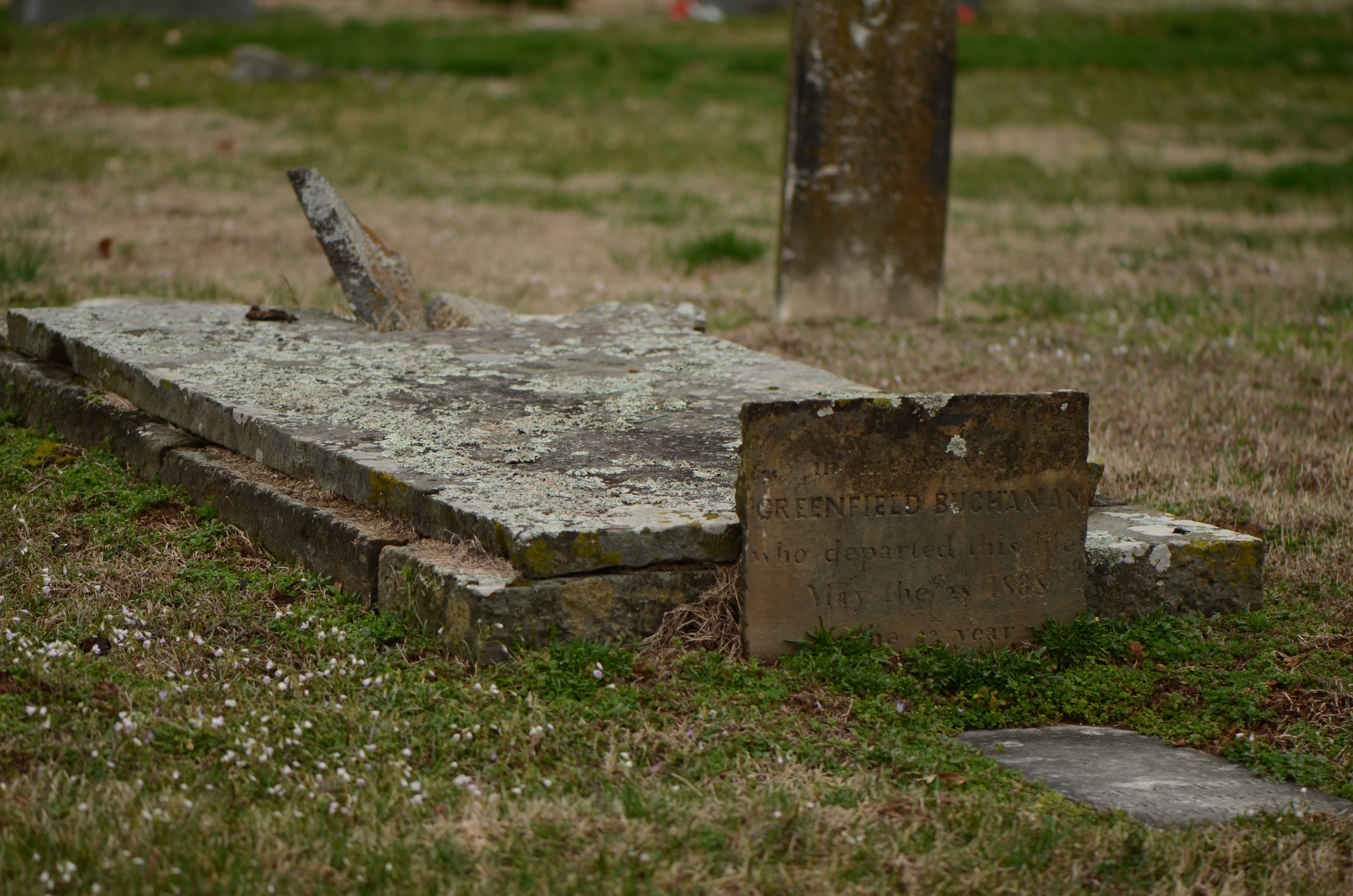
Grave and headstone, taken 2016

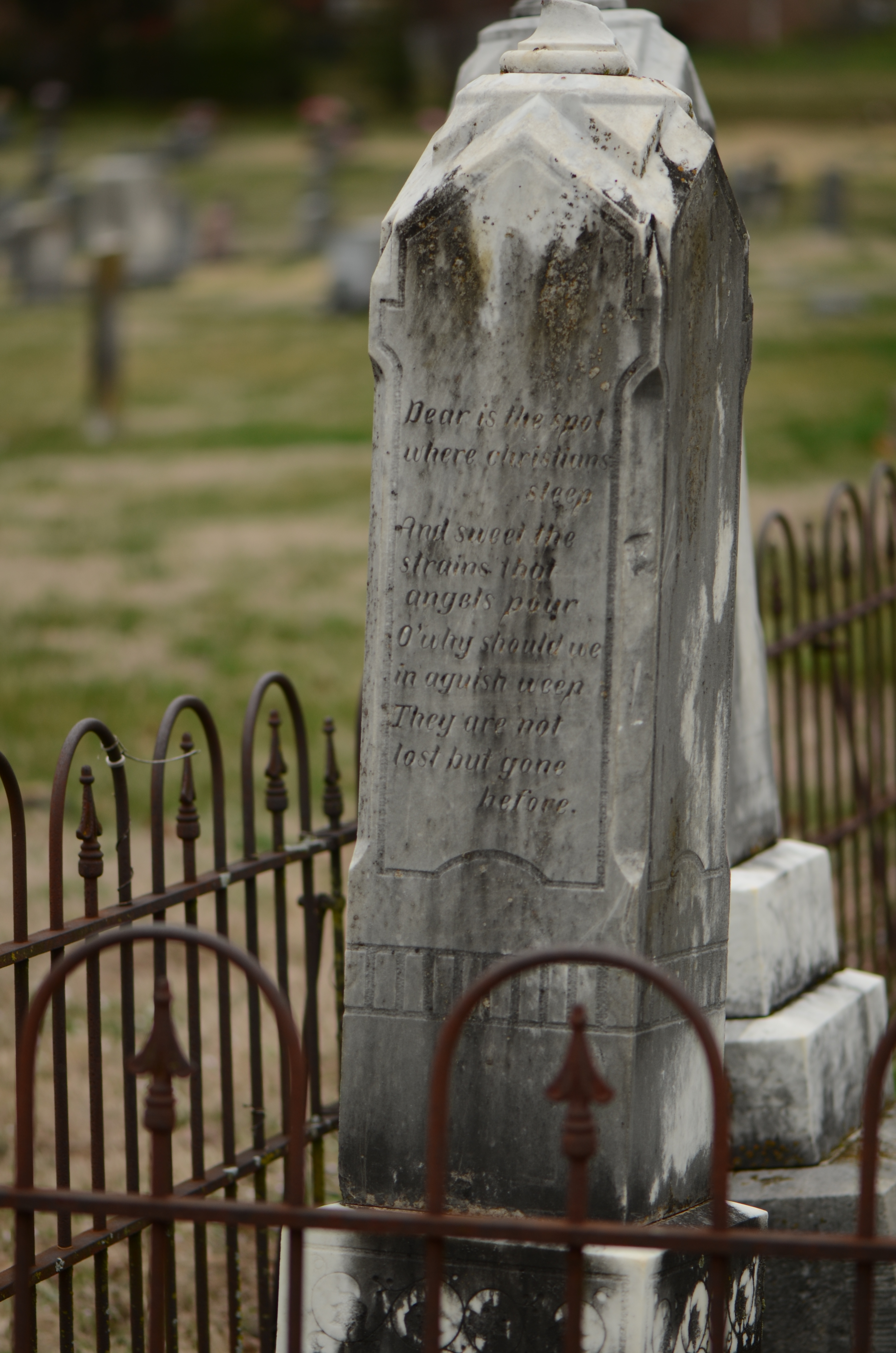
Grave marker, taken 2016

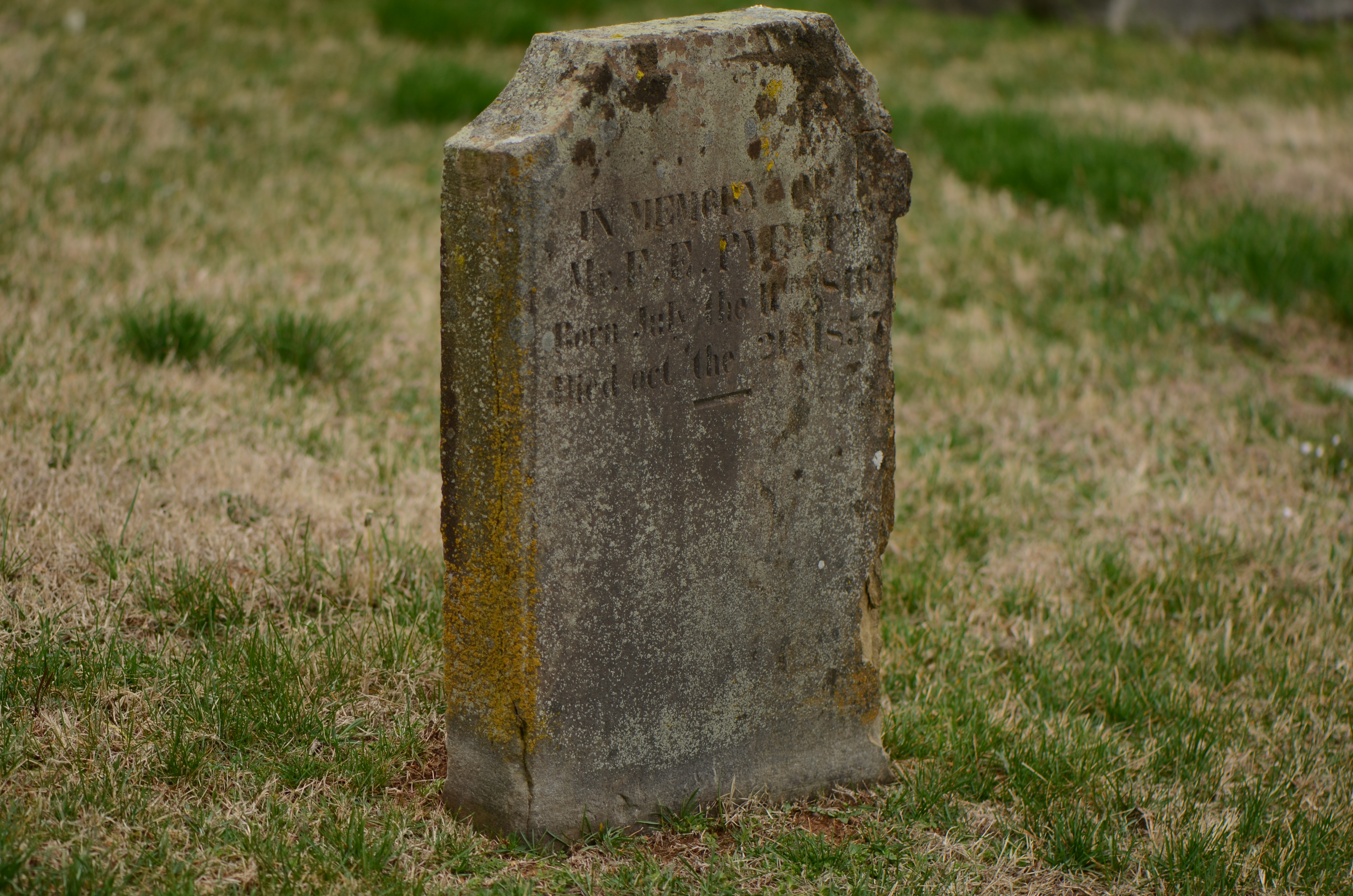
Headstone, taken 2016

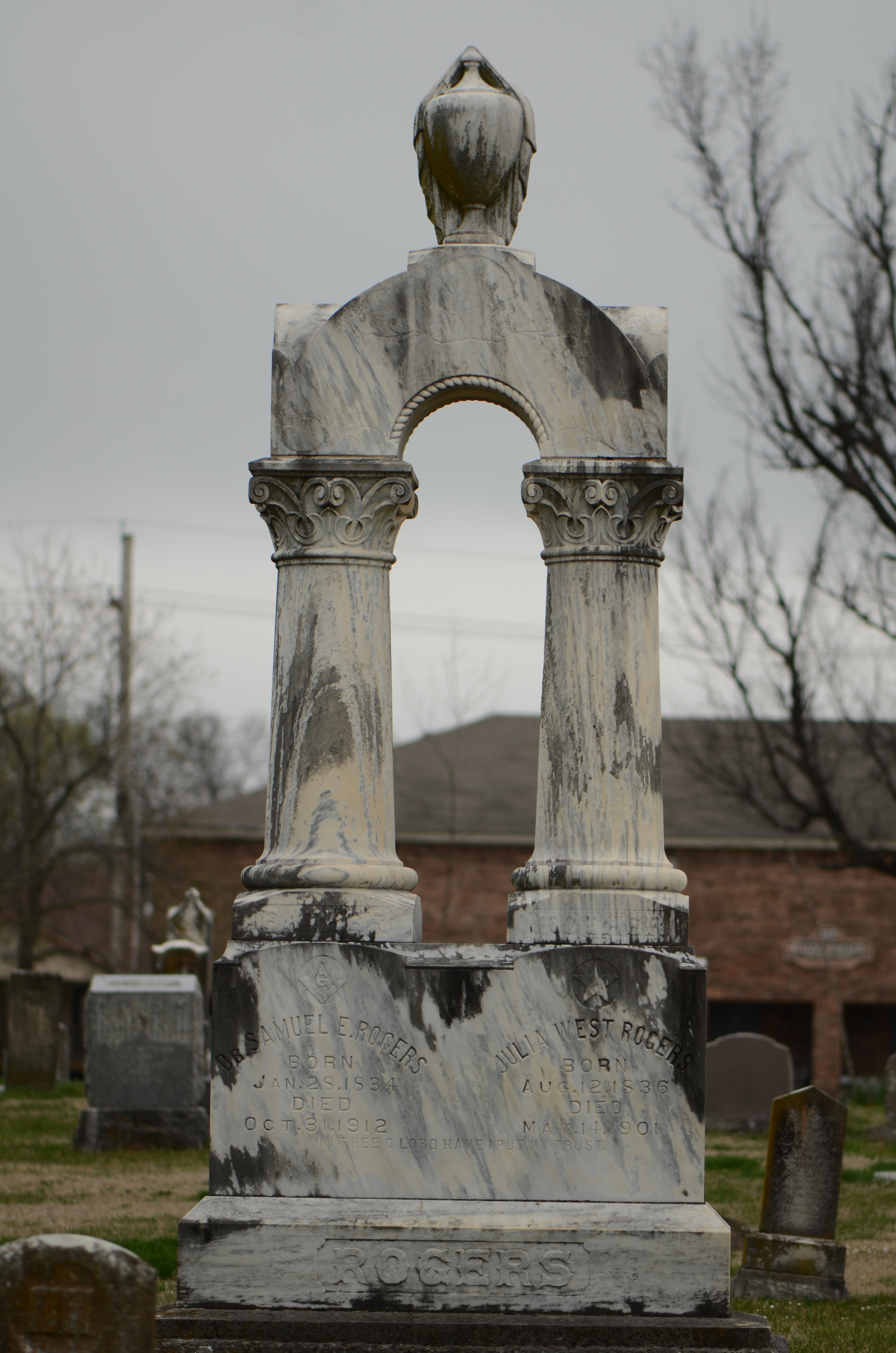
Headstone, taken 11 March 2016

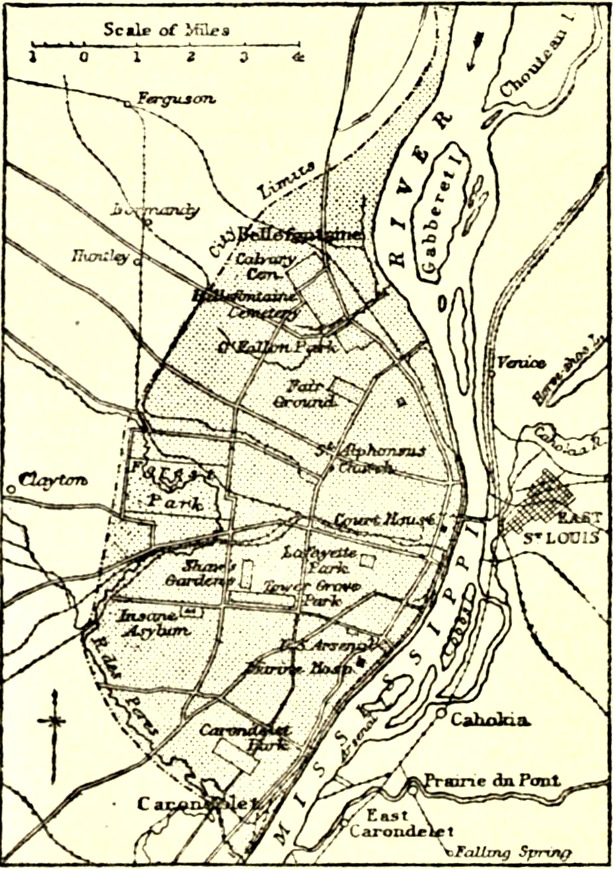
St. Louis, Missouri, and environs

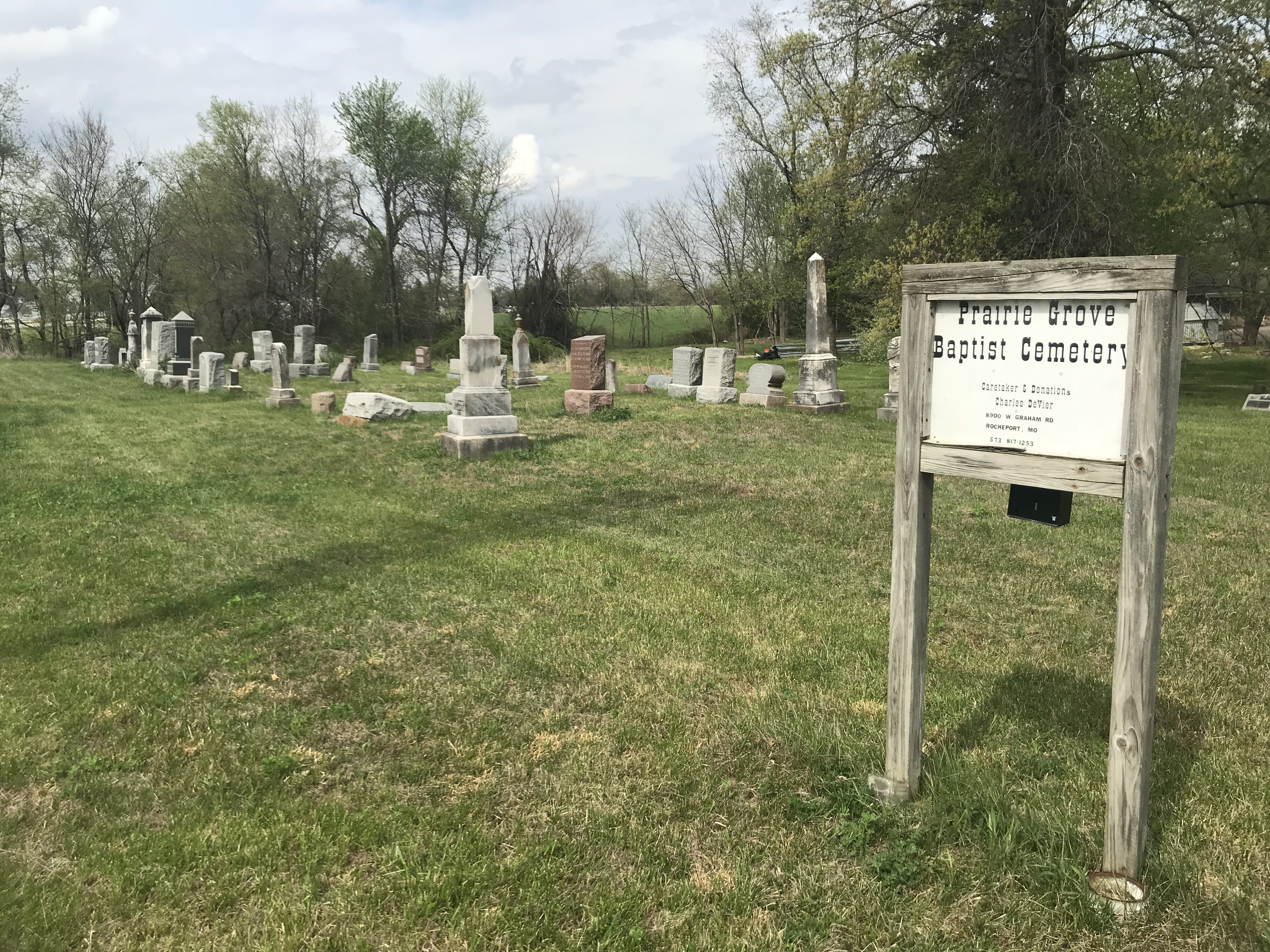
Prairie Grove Baptist Church Cemetery, 2018

== See also ==
- National Register of Historic Places listings in Washington County, Arkansas
