= Black Oak Cemetery =

Historic cemetery in Arkansas, United States

- U.S. National Register of Historic Places
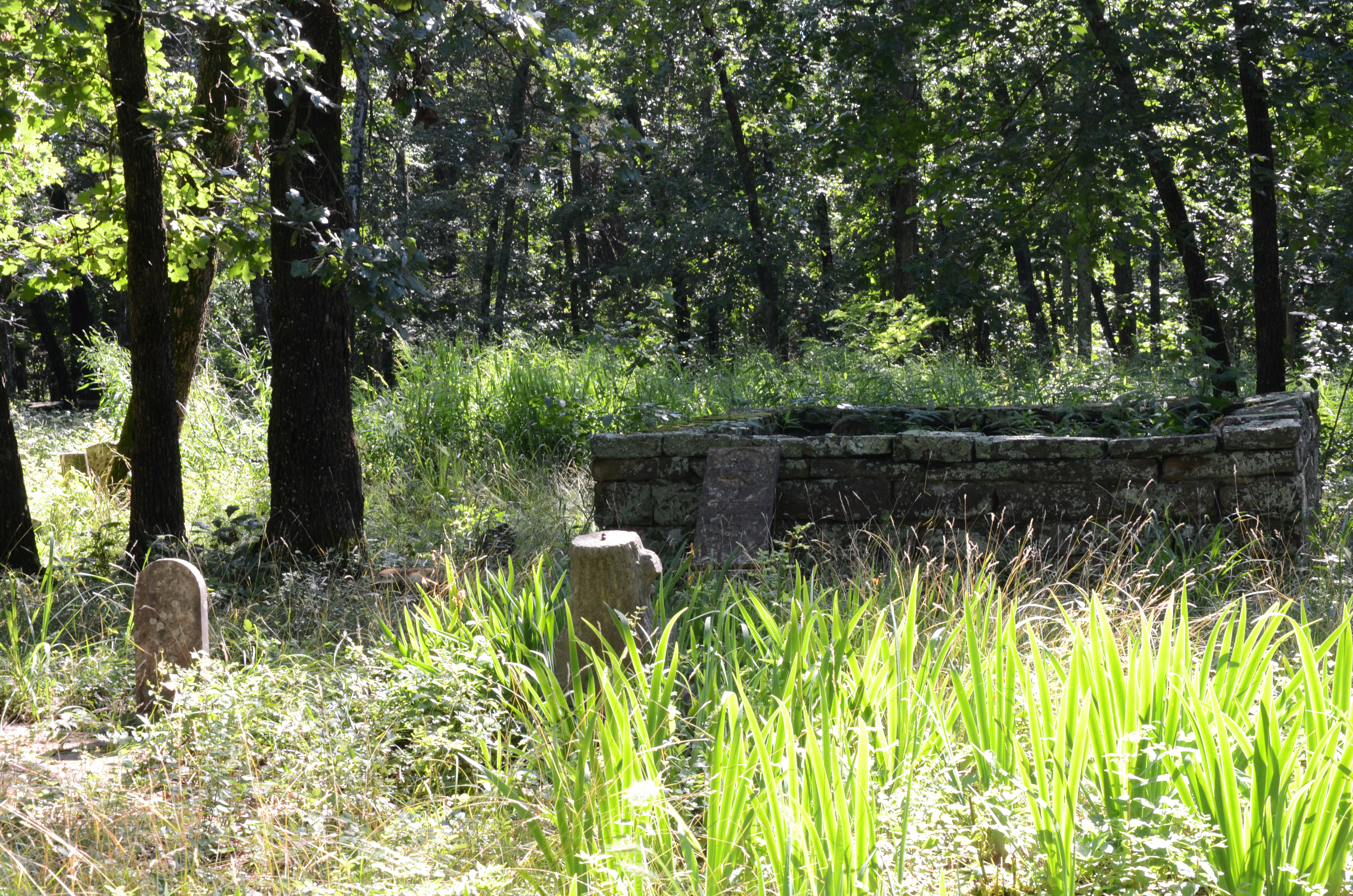

- Location within Arkansas Location within the United States
- Nearest city: Greenland, Arkansas
- Coordinates: 35°58′55″N 94°13′45″W
- Area: 3 acres (1.2 ha)
- Built: 1843
- NRHP reference No.: 98000619
- Added to NRHP: June 3, 1998

The Black Oak Cemetery is a historic cemetery in a remote area of Washington County, Arkansas, southwest of Greenland. It is located on a knob of land at the southern end of a north–south ridge east of Miller Mountain, and is best accessed via spur road running northward from Illinois Chapel Road (County Road 20) west of Arkansas Highway 265. The 3-acre (1.2 ha) cemetery contains an estimated 300 burials, with known dates of burial ranging from 1843 to 1935. The entrance to the cemetery is marked by a pair of stone piers, and its northern extent is thought to be marked by a line of cedar trees. Some of Washington County's earliest settlers are buried in this cemetery, including its first territorial representative, John Alexander.

The cemetery was listed on the National Register of Historic Places in 1998.

== See also ==
- National Register of Historic Places listings in Washington County, Arkansas
