= Benton County Poor Farm Cemetery =

Historic cemetery in Arkansas, United States

- U.S. National Register of Historic Places
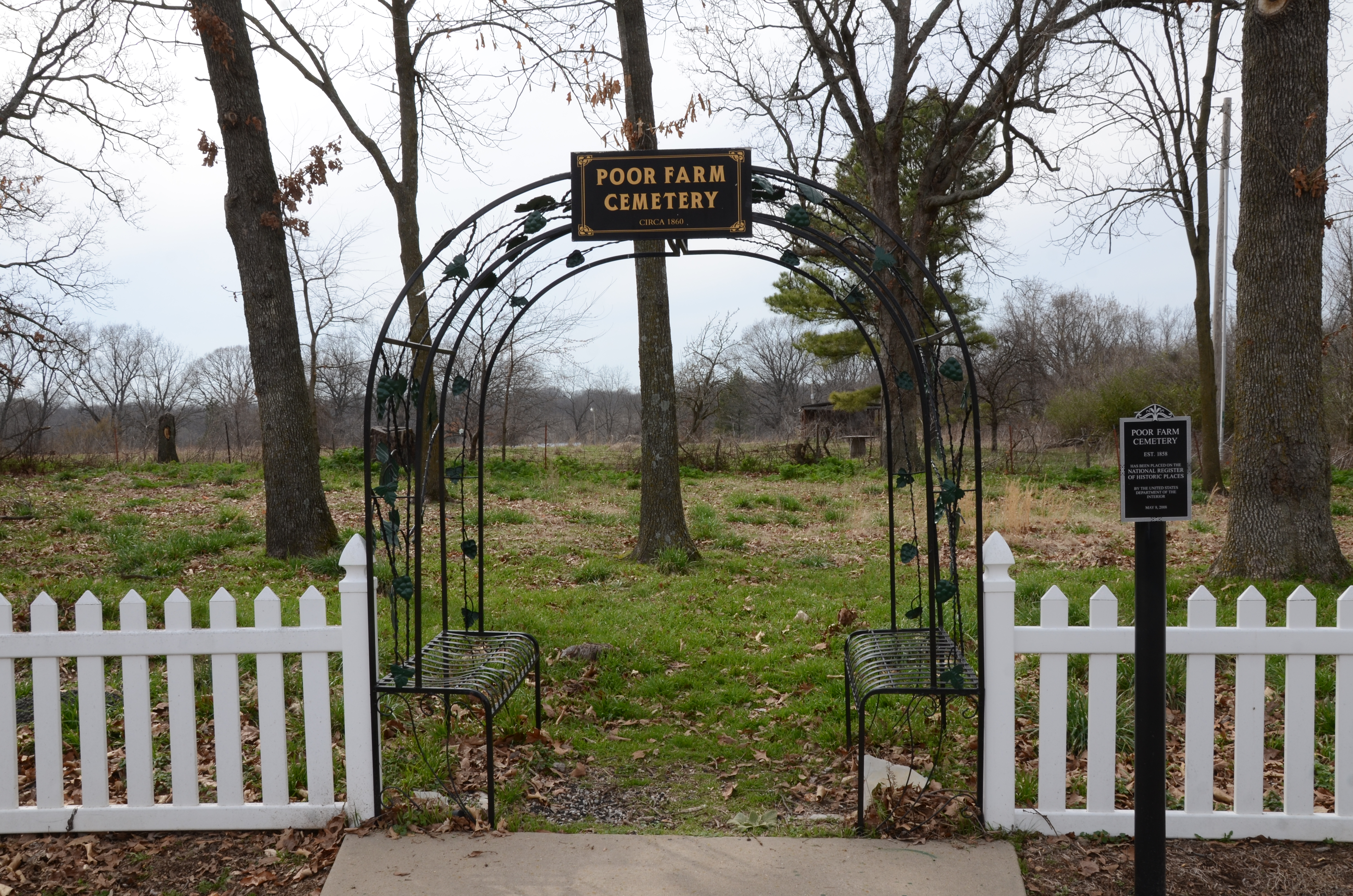

- Location within Arkansas Location within the United States
- Location: W. side NE. Young Ave. approx. 200 ft. N. of NE. Carnahan Ct., Bentonville, Arkansas
- Coordinates: 36°23′34″N 94°12′2″W
- Area: less than one acre
- Built: 1860
- NRHP reference No.: 08000431
- Added to NRHP: May 20, 2008

The Benton County Poor Farm Cemetery is a historic cemetery in Bentonville, Arkansas. It is located off NE Young Avenue in a residential subdivision northeast of the city's center. It was established c. 1860, around the time Benton County's poor farm was established, and it was in active use until the poor farm was closed c. 1930. It has a small number of marked graves, and an unknown number of unmarked graves, some of which are distinguishable by the presence of depressions in the ground.

The cemetery, which is the only tangible remnant of the poor farm, was listed on the National Register of Historic Places in 2008.

== See also ==
- National Register of Historic Places listings in Benton County, Arkansas
