= Little Rock National Cemetery =

Historic veterans cemetery in Pulaski County, Arkansas

- U.S. National Register of Historic Places
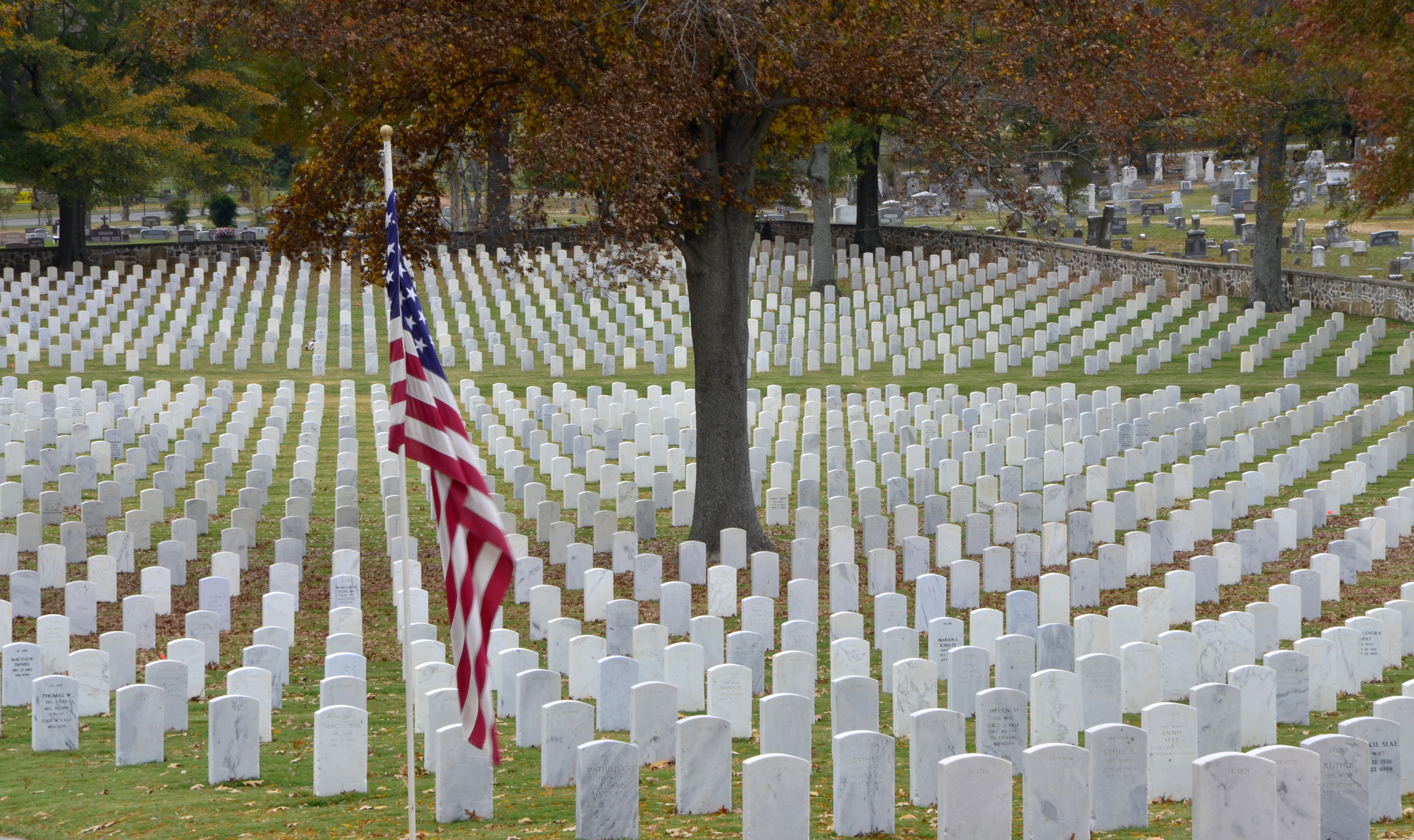

- Location within Arkansas Location within the United States
- Location: 2523 Springer Blvd., Little Rock, Arkansas
- Coordinates: 34°43′30″N 92°15′27″W
- Area: 30.7 acres (12.4 ha)
- Built: 1868
- MPS: Civil War Era National Cemeteries MPS
- NRHP reference No.: 96001496
- Added to NRHP: December 20, 1996

Little Rock National Cemetery is a United States National Cemetery, located approximately two miles (3 km) south-east of the Arkansas State Capitol Building, being within the city of Little Rock, and Pulaski County, Arkansas. It encompasses 31.7 acres (12.8 ha), and as of the end of 2005, had 25,172 interments. Administered by the United States Department of Veterans Affairs, it is currently closed to new interments.

== History ==
The area around Little Rock National Cemetery was once a Union encampment. The cemetery itself was a plot within the Little Rock City Cemetery, purchased by the federal government in 1866 and was used to inter Union soldiers who died anywhere in Arkansas. It was officially declared a National Cemetery on April 9, 1868 at which time 3 acres (1.2 ha) were added.

In 1884, an 11-acre (4.5 ha) Confederate cemetery was established immediately adjacent to the National Cemetery. In 1938, the two cemeteries were combined, though the Union and Confederate burials continued to be in separate sections.

In 1990, additional land was purchased from the nearby Oakland-Fraternal Cemetery, and in November 1999 the city of Little Rock donated 1-acre (0.40 ha), bringing the cemetery to its current size.

Little Rock National Cemetery was listed on the National Register of Historic Places in 1996.

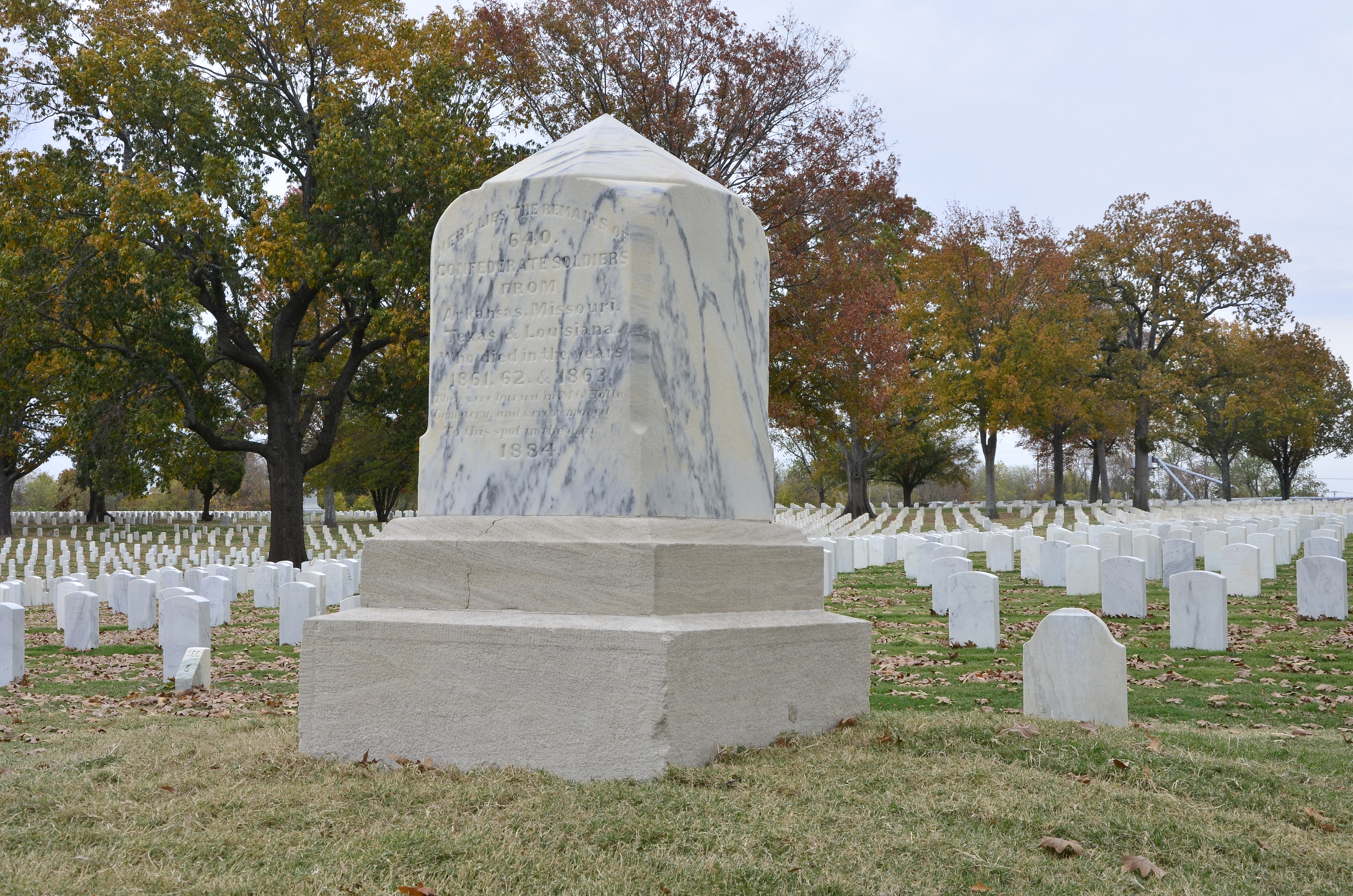
Memorial to 640 Confederate soldiers buried nearby

== Noteworthy monuments ==
- The Confederate Memorial, erected in 1884.
- The Minnesota Monument, a granite and bronze monument erected in 1916.

== Notable interments ==
- Lieutenant Maurice Britt (1919–1995), Medal of Honor recipient for action in World War II, Lieutenant Governor of Arkansas
- Sergeant Simon A. Haley (1892–1973), professor of agriculture and father of author Alex Haley
- Dick Hogan (1917–1995), actor
- John "Poker Jack" McClure (1834-1915), Arkansas Supreme Court associate justice from 1868 to 1871, and chief justice from 1871 to 1874
- Earl Sutton Smith (1897–1963), Major League Baseball player
- Captain John H. Yancey (1918–1986), decorated United States Marine of World War II and the Korean War

== See also ==
- National Register of Historic Places listings in Little Rock, Arkansas
- List of cemeteries in Arkansas
