= Frenchman's Mountain Methodist Episcopal Church-South and Cemetery =

Historic church in Arkansas, United States

- Frenchman's Mountain Methodist Episcopal Church–South and Cemetery
- U.S. National Register of Historic Places
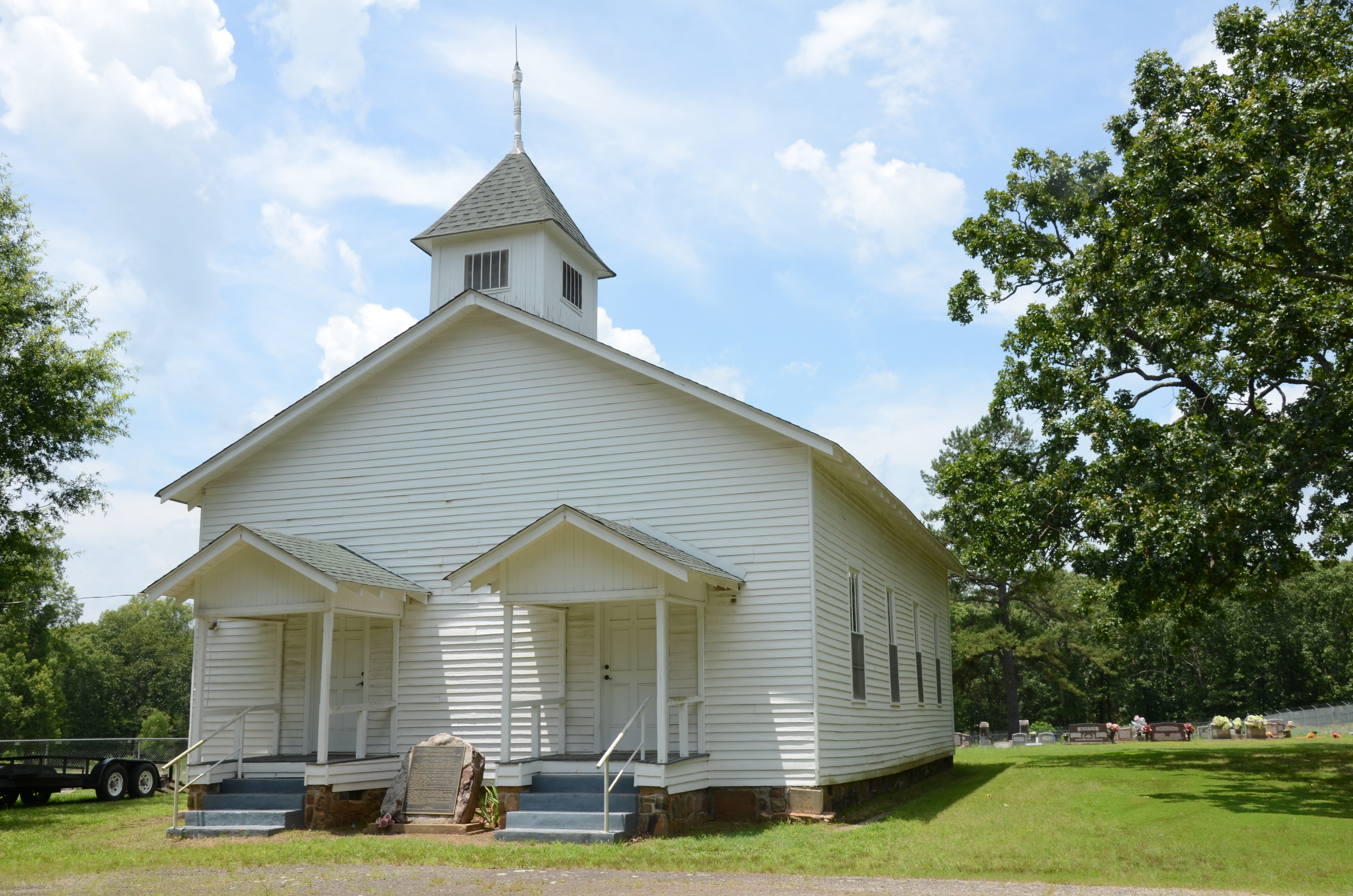

- Location within Arkansas Location within the United States
- Nearest city: Cato, Arkansas
- Coordinates: 34°55′41″N 92°15′53″W
- Area: 5 acres (2.0 ha)
- Built: 1880
- NRHP reference No.: 76000450
- Added to NRHP: October 22, 1976

The Frenchman's Mountain Methodist Episcopal Church–South and Cemetery is a historic church in Cato, Arkansas. Located at the junction of Cato, Frenchman Mountain, and Camp Joseph Robinson Roads, it is a single-story wood-frame structure, built in 1880 as a two-story building to house both religious services and the local Masonic lodge. The upper story, housing the lodge facilities, was removed in 1945. The congregation was organized in 1872 in Cato, the oldest community in northern Pulaski County. The church declined after most of the land in the area was taken to establish Camp Joseph T. Robinson, with the church now enclaved within its bounds.

The church and its adjacent cemetery were listed on the National Register of Historic Places in 1976.

== See also ==
- National Register of Historic Places listings in Pulaski County, Arkansas
