= Hardy Cemetery =

Historic cemetery in Arkansas, United States

- Hardy Cemetery Historic Section
- U.S. National Register of Historic Places
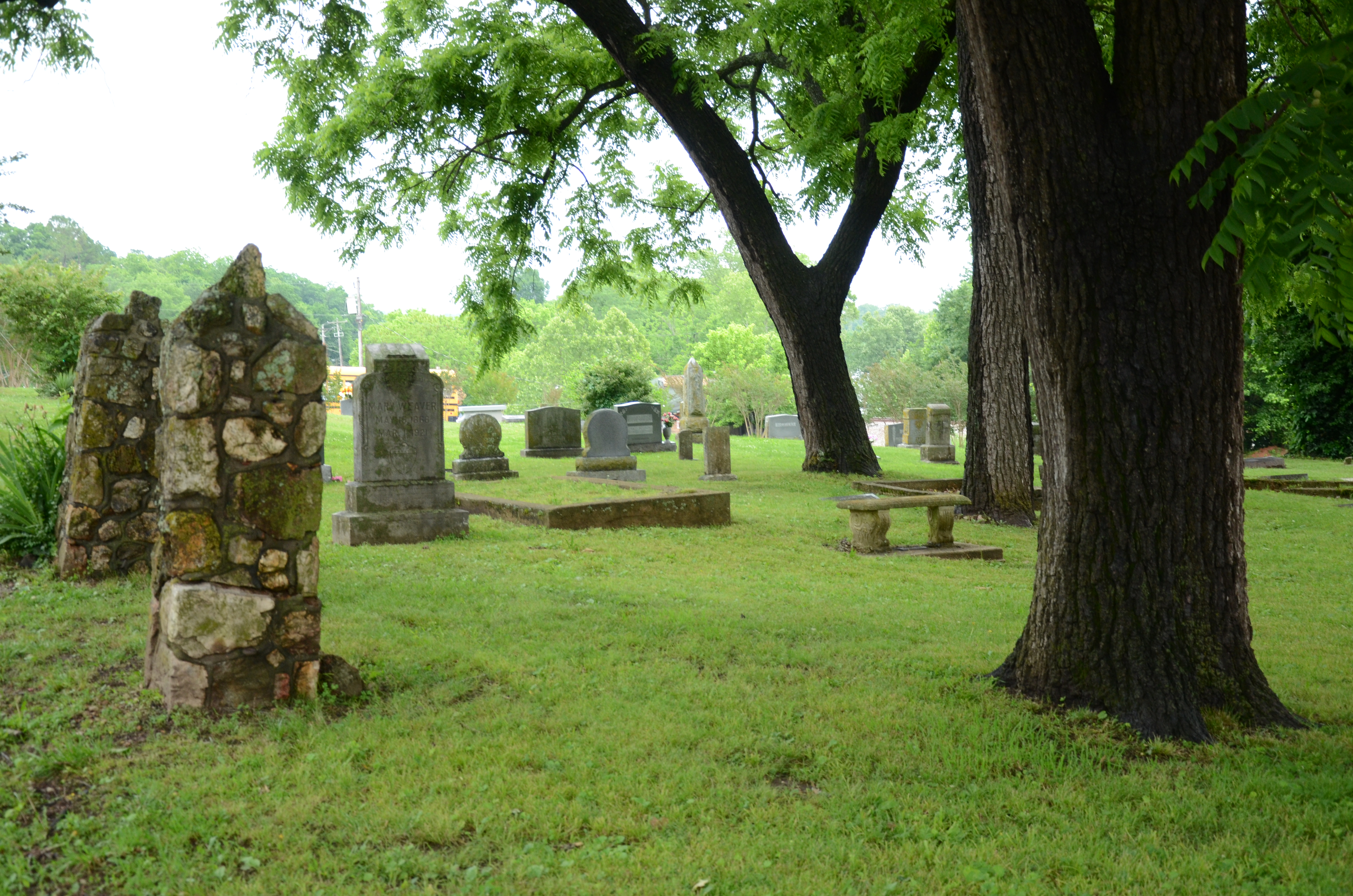

- Location within Arkansas Location within the United States
- Location: Bounded by Main St., Kelly St., Cope Ave. and Burlington RR, Hardy, Arkansas
- Coordinates: 36°19′2″N 91°28′44″W
- Area: 1.1 acres (0.45 ha)
- Built: 1888
- MPS: Hardy, Arkansas MPS
- NRHP reference No.: 06000089
- Added to NRHP: March 2, 2006

The Hardy Cemetery is the main cemetery of Hardy, Arkansas. It is located on the south side of Main Street, east of Hardy's downtown business district. The cemetery is about 1.6 acres (0.65 ha) in size. When the city of Hardy was laid out in 1883, a 1.1-acre (0.45 ha) parcel of land for the cemetery was donated by one of its founders, Walker Clayton. This was expanded by about 1/2 acre in 1979, with the donation of land by members of the Biggers family. The original portion of the cemetery, where a number of Hardy's founders and later leading citizens are buried, was listed on the National Register of Historic Places in 2006.

== See also ==
- National Register of Historic Places listings in Sharp County, Arkansas
