= Colville, Arkansas =

Unincorporated community in Arkansas, US

Coordinates: 36.258688°N 94.194649°W

Colville is an unincorporated community in Benton County, Arkansas, United States. It is the location of (or is the nearest community to) Mt. Hebron M.E. Church South and Cemetery, which is located at 1079 Mt. Hebron Road and is listed on the National Register of Historic Places.
