= Pyeatte-Mason Cemetery =

Historic cemetery in Arkansas, United States

- Pyeatte--Mason Cemetery
- U.S. National Register of Historic Places
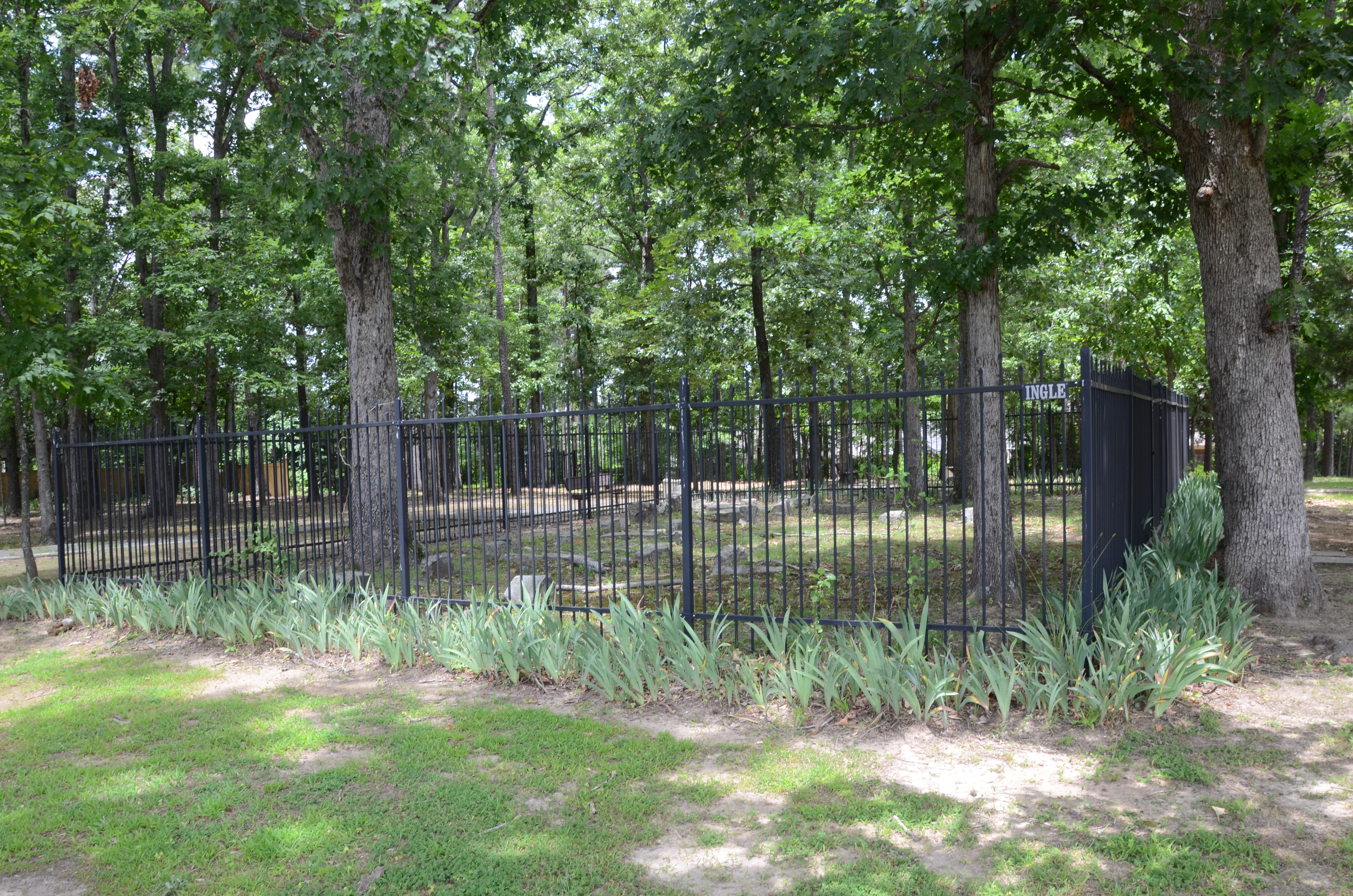

- Location within Arkansas Location within the United States
- Location: Jct. of Waterside and Lily Sts., SW corner, Maumelle, Arkansas
- Coordinates: 34°51′7″N 92°25′10″W
- Area: less than one acre
- Built: 1818
- NRHP reference No.: 96001276
- Added to NRHP: November 7, 1996

The Pyeatte-Mason Cemetery is a small historic cemetery at the junction of Waterside and Lily Streets on the west side of Maumelle, Arkansas. It occupies a small wooded lot, and has ten marked graves. It contains graves of some of Pulaski County's earliest settlers, the Pyeatte and Carnahan families. They settled this area in 1812, calling it Crystal Hill. The only dated graves in the cemetery are marked 1818 and 1883. They were led by the brothers James Pyeatt, a farmer, and Jacob Pyeatt, who operated a ferry on the Arkansas River. The first Protestant services held in Arkansas were conducted in 1812 in the home of James Pyeatt by the Reverend John Carnahan of the Cumberland Presbyterian Church. The original settlement, called Pyeattstown, grew to 150 people by 1819. Pyeatte township was formed in 1823. James Pyeatt died in 1833 and was buried near his land in a small cemetery that is now near the Maumelle Country Club's golf course. The township of Maumelle was formed in 1842. It was composed of two sections: Little Maumelle and Big Maumelle.

The cemetery was listed on the National Register of Historic Places in 1996.

== See also ==
- National Register of Historic Places listings in Pulaski County, Arkansas
