= St. Peter's Cemetery (Jefferson County, Arkansas) =

Historic cemetery near Pine Bluff

- U.S. National Register of Historic Places
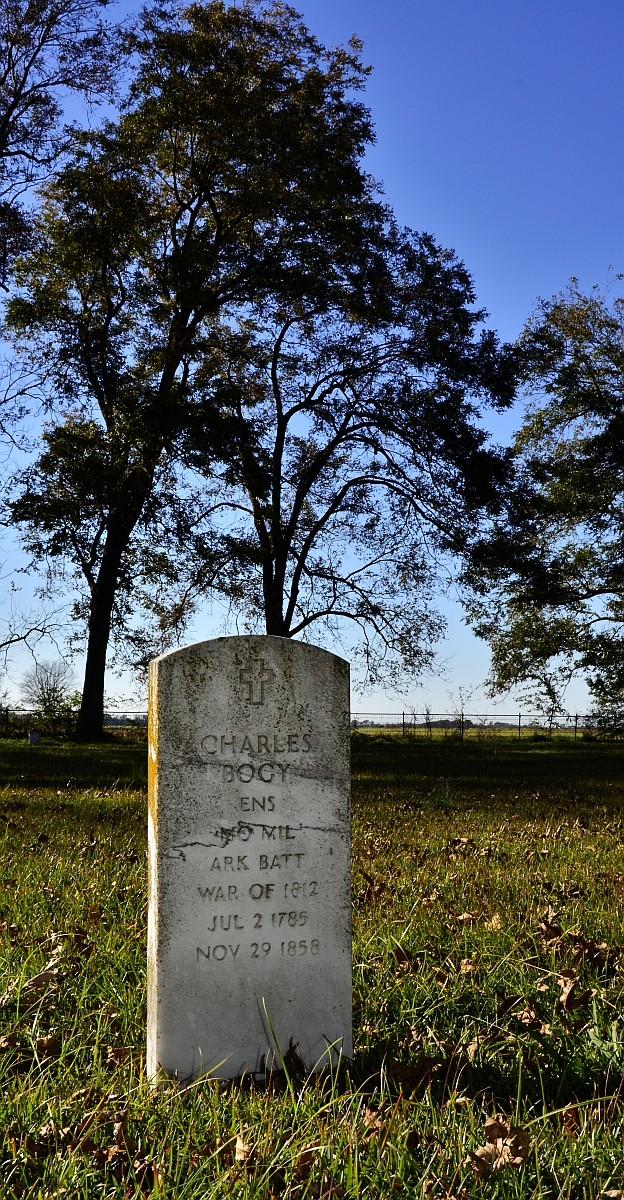

- Location within Arkansas Location within the United States
- Nearest city: Pine Bluff, Arkansas
- Coordinates: 34°13′16″N 91°46′42″W
- Area: 2 acres (0.81 ha)
- NRHP reference No.: 98000617
- Added to NRHP: June 4, 1998

St. Peter's Cemetery is a historic rural cemetery in eastern Jefferson County, Arkansas. It is located east of Pine Bluff, Arkansas, on the south side of Morgan Drive, about 2 miles (3.2 km) west of Arkansas Highway 88. The 2-acre (0.81 ha) cemetery was established in 1827, and is one of the few surviving remnants of the former community of New Gascony, one of the county's oldest communities. The cemetery has lain dormant since 1927, and is maintained by volunteers.

The cemetery was listed on the National Register of Historic Places in 1998.

== See also ==
- National Register of Historic Places listings in Jefferson County, Arkansas
