= R v McCraw =

- Supreme Court of Canada

Hearing: June 4, 1991 Judgment: September 26, 1991
- Full case name: Stephen Joseph McCraw v Her Majesty The Queen
- Citations: [1991] 3 S.C.R. 72; 1991 CanLII 29 (S.C.C.); (1991), 66 C.C.C. (3d) 517; (1991), 7 C.R. (4th) 314; (1991), 49 O.A.C. 47
- Prior history: Appeal from Court of Appeal for Ontario
- Ruling: Rape threats contained in letters constituted a threat of serious bodily harm.

Court membership
- Chief Justice: Antonio Lamer; Puisne Justices: Gérard La Forest, Claire L'Heureux-Dubé, John Sopinka, Charles Gonthier, Peter Cory, Beverley McLachlin, William Stevenson, Frank Iacobucci

Reasons given
- Majority: Cory, joined by Lamer, La Forest, L'Heureux‑Dubé, Sopinka, Stevenson and Iacobucci
- Concurrence: None
- Dissent: None

R v McCraw, [1991] 3 S.C.R. 72 was a decision by the Supreme Court of Canada on rape threats. The Court found that such threats should be considered threats of bodily harm under the Criminal Code.

== Background ==
The case involved one Stephen Joseph McCraw, who was interested in the cheerleaders of the football team Ottawa Rough Riders. One day, he phoned some of the cheerleaders and mailed them letters. The letters stated that he wanted to have sex with them and if necessary would rape them to do it. One letter quoted by the Supreme Court read:

Sandy
Let me tell you, your a beautiful woman, I am disapointed you wernt in the calendar, you are the most beautiful cheerleader on the squad. I think you should pose nude for playboy. Every time I see you I get an instant erection. I masturbate thinking about you every night. Fucking you would be like a dream come true. I would lick your whole body, starting with your toes, up your legs, then right to your vagina. I would love to taste your juicy vagina. Then I would suck on your perfect, well shaped breasts, I would then turn you over and lick your asshole. Then you would go down and suck my dick. Once I am nice and horny, I would stick my dick in your vagina. Then I would shove my dick into your nice tight asshole. Then you would suck my dick, and I would shoot my sperm all over your face. I am going to fuck you even if I have to rape you. Even if it takes me till the day I die. There should be more beautiful woman around like you.
See you later and have a nice day! [sic]

McCraw was arrested and the cheerleaders said in court that they had been terrified by the letters. Nevertheless, the judge found that while the letters did threaten rape, they may not have threatened bodily harm. Instead, the judge called the content of the letters an "adoring fantasy" and said rape can be performed without inflicting physical or emotional damage to the victim.

== Decision ==
The decision of the Supreme Court was written by Peter Cory. He noted that until 1985, the Criminal Code outlawed any threat to kill or injure a person except threats spoken in front of a person. A major decision on that law was R v Nabis (1975), and the Parliament of Canada afterwards decided a better law was needed. The new law outlawed any kind of threat regarding bodily harm or killing. Cory found that bodily harm does not only mean killing.

As the law also referred to "serious bodily harm," Cory consulted The Shorter Oxford English Dictionary and found that "serious" meant "substantial", so "serious bodily harm" means substantial damage to the victim's health. Cory concluded that this law would likely cover emotional damage, as the types of bodily harm covered by the law were not limited. The Supreme Court also decided that the new law was meant to guard against threats that terrorize people, and that the law had a significant goal of upholding an individual's freedom. R v LeBlanc (1989) was another case that found that terror was what was important and not whether the crime would actually occur.

Cory asserted that "Violence is inherent in the act of rape." He explained that in rape, sex and violence are intertwined, and that the rapist is exercising force which may have temporary physical effects but nevertheless potentially permanent emotional impact. Cory said,

It seems to me that to argue that a woman who has been forced to have sexual intercourse has not necessarily suffered grave and serious violence is to ignore the perspective of women. For women rape under any circumstance must constitute a profound interference with their physical integrity. As well, by force or threat of force, it denies women the right to exercise freedom of choice as to their partner for sexual relations and the timing of those relations. These are choices of great importance that may have a substantial effect upon the life and health of every woman. Parliament's intention in replacing the rape laws with the sexual assault offences was to convey the message that rape is not just a sexual act but is basically an act of violence.

To back this up, Cory pointed to journal articles describing how victims often become depressed, cannot sleep, feel guilty or devalued, lose trust in people and become uninterested in sex. Thus, for the law not to recognize this would be a step backwards for sensitivity.

== Aftermath ==
The McCraw case has been cited by the Supreme Court in later cases. For example, in R v CD; R v CDK (2005), the Court noted that while the Youth Criminal Justice Act did not define "violent offence" and "serious bodily harm," McCraw indicated that these phrases referred to substantial damage to a victim's health.
