= Frederick Rehfeld =

American politician (1824–1883)

- Rehfeld c. 1857

Member of the Minnesota House of Representatives from the 17th Distirct
- In office December 2, 1857 – January 7, 1861

Postmaster of New Ulm, Minnesota
- In office April 10, 1858 – March 29, 1861
- Preceded by: C.J. Koehne
- Succeeded by: Frederick Forster

Personal details
- Born: 1824 Kingdom of Saxony, German Confederation
- Died: 1883 (aged 58–59) United States

Frederick "Fred" Rehfeld (born c. 1824 – 1883) was a German American businessman and politician who served two consecutive terms in the Minnesota Legislature.

== Early life and career ==
Rehfeld was born around 1824, in the Kingdom of Saxony, he emigrated to the United States and settled in New Ulm in Minnesota Territory by 1856. While in New Ulm, Rehfeld was involved in the lumber industry and was the business partner of Frederick Beinhorn, one of the founders of New Ulm.^{:302}

=== Lumber and milling ===
In 1856 Rehfeld and Beinhorn were stockholders of the Eagle Mill, a sawmill and gristmill in New Ulm which burned down in 1859–1860.^{:711} The mill was the first dual purpose mill erected in New Ulm.^{:424}^{:711} Rehfeld and Beinhorn purchased the ruins of the Eagle Mill and rebuilt it with public funds.^{:289} Rehfeld's mill was eventually burned and destroyed in 1862 during the Dakota War of 1862.^{:424} Rehfeld's mill was eventually purchased by Jacob Pfenninger and Werner Boesch in 1865.

== Political career ==
=== Minnesota House ===
Beginning in 1857, Rehfeld ran for a seat in the Minnesota House of Representatives representing Minnesota's 17th House district. At the time the district included Brown County and Nicollet County. Rehfeld won the House election on October 13, 1857, and served in the 1st Minnesota Legislature, during his first term Rehfeld was the chairman of the Indian affairs committee. Rehfeld was reelected to the Minnesota House on October 11, 1859, he served in the same House district. Rehfeld served during the 2nd Minnesota Legislature, during his second term Rehfeld served on the claims committee and the towns and counties committee.

=== Postmaster ===
Rehfeld was appointed as the postmaster of New Ulm on April 10, 1858, he served as postmaster until March 29, 1861.^{:482}^{:485}

== Later life ==
Rehfeld's home and sawmill were both destroyed by fire during the Battles of New Ulm in 1862.^{:244}^{:289} Rehfeld died in 1883.^{:302}
