= McCraw Cemetery =

Historic cemetery in Arkansas, United States

- U.S. National Register of Historic Places
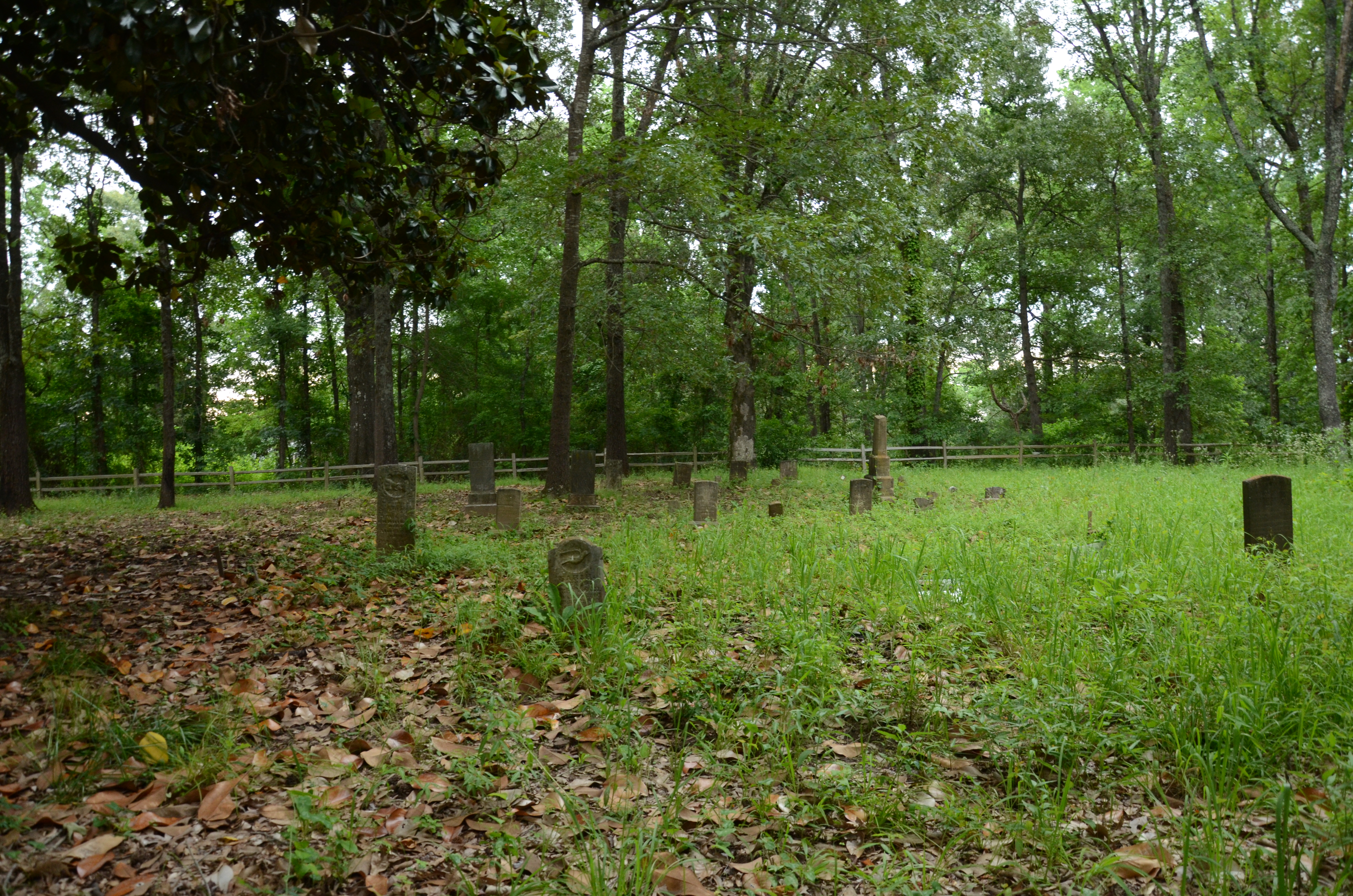

- Location within Arkansas Location within the United States
- Location: S. of Military Rd (AR 294), Jacksonville, Arkansas
- Coordinates: 34°51′10″N 92°5′15″W
- Area: 0.7 acres (0.28 ha)
- Built: 1841
- NRHP reference No.: 06000829
- Added to NRHP: September 20, 2006

The McCraw Cemetery is a historic cemetery in Jacksonville, Arkansas. It is located in a wooded area on the city's southeastern outskirts, well south of the Military Road (Arkansas Highway 264), and west of the Military Mobile Homes. It has 37 marked graves, of which ten are of children. The markers date from 1841 to 1937, and include some of the first settlers of northern Pulaski County. The cemetery, a family plot of the McCraw family, was lost for many years, and is now under the care of the Reed's Bridge Historical Society.

The cemetery was listed on the National Register of Historic Places in 2006.

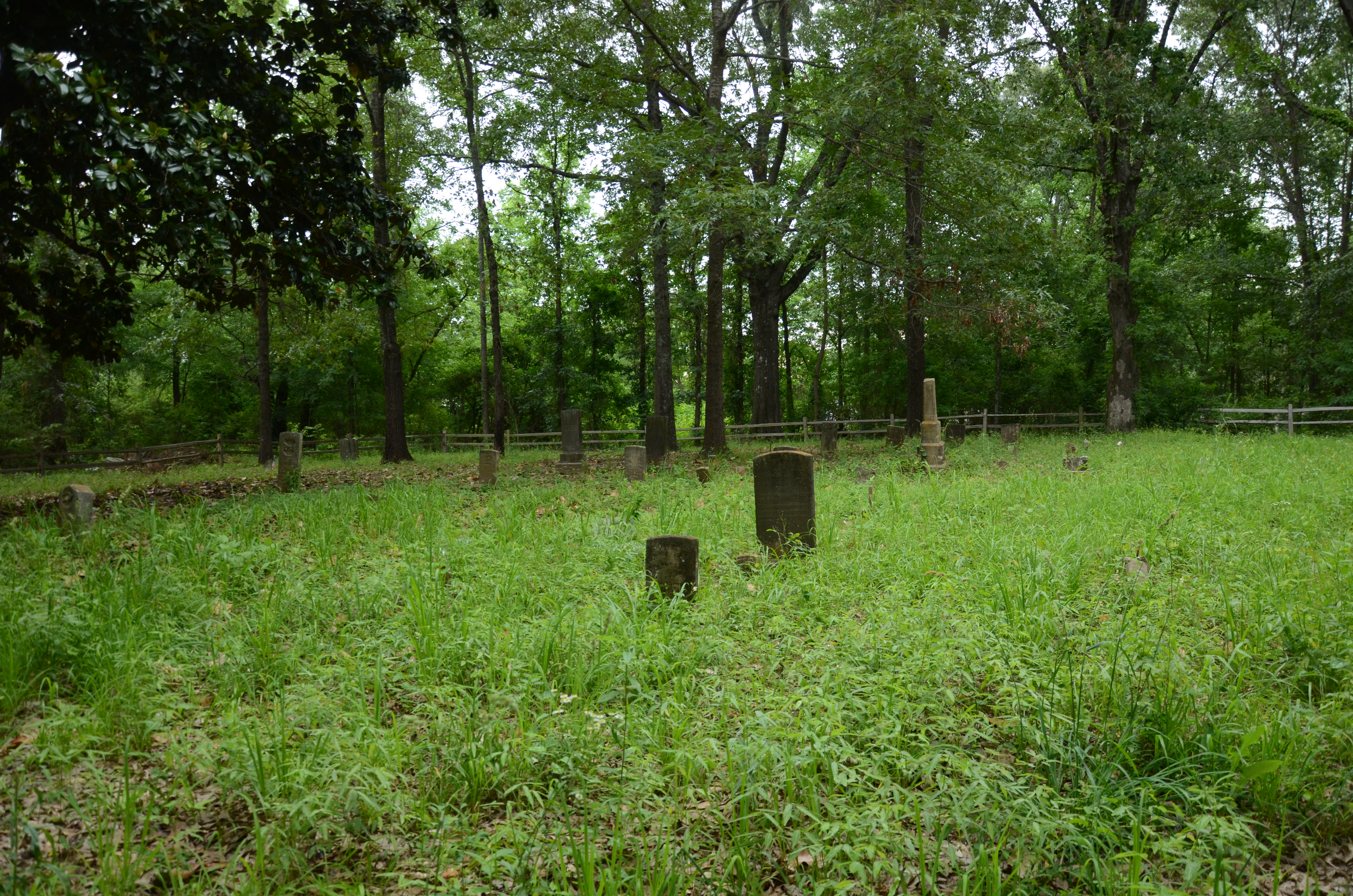
View of the cemetery

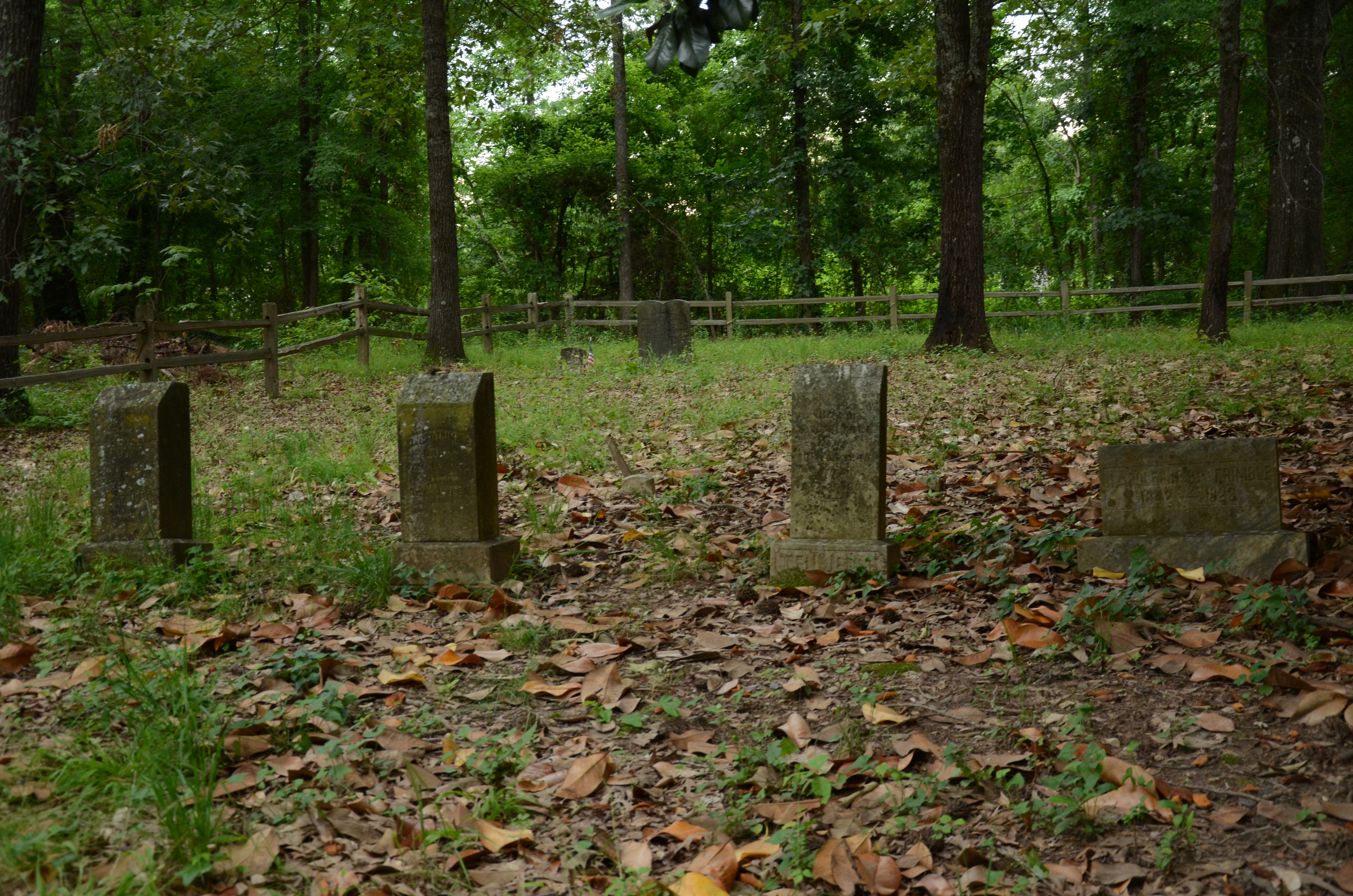
Four headstones

== See also ==
- National Register of Historic Places listings in Pulaski County, Arkansas
