= Cane Hill (disambiguation) =

Cane Hill was a psychiatric hospital in Coulsdon in the London Borough of Croydon.

Cane Hill may also refer to:

- Cane Hill Township, Washington County, Arkansas
  - Canehill, Arkansas
- Cane Hill College, an institution of higher learning in Arkansas
- Cane Hill, Missouri, an unincorporated community

== Music ==
- Cane Hill (band), an American nu-metal band
- Cane Hill (EP), 2015 debut EP by American nu-metal band Cane Hill

== See also ==
- Cane Hill Cemetery, a cemetery in Canehill, Arkansas
- Battle of Cane Hill, an 1862 American Civil War battle in Arkansas
- Cane Hill Formation, a geologic formation in Arkansas
- Caen Hill Locks, a flight on the Kennet and Avon Canal
