= Earle House (Canehill, Arkansas) =

Historic house in Arkansas, United States

- U.S. National Register of Historic Places
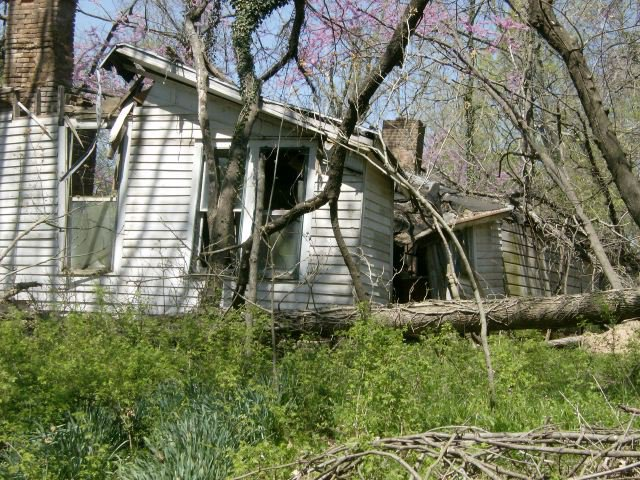
- Earle House, May 2011

- Location within Arkansas Location within the United States
- Location: AR 45, Canehill, Arkansas
- Coordinates: 35°54′18″N 94°23′45″W
- Area: less than one acre
- Built: 1859
- Architectural style: Greek Revival
- MPS: Canehill MRA
- NRHP reference No.: 82000945
- Added to NRHP: November 17, 1982

Earle House is a house in Canehill, Arkansas on Highway 45 built in 1859 to house Dr. Fountain R. Earle, the president of Cane Hill College. The property was added to the National Register of Historic Places along with many other Canehill properties in November 1982. The house, set well back from the highway, is a single-story wood-frame structure, with a side gable roof and a projecting gable-roof section on the front (western) facade. This projection has box columns supporting a delicate frieze and box cornice, with a raking cornice joining it to form a pediment. Chimneys are located at the gable ends.

== History ==
Canehill was settled in 1827, a year prior to the establishment of Washington County. The Township of Cane Hill was established in 1829 and was mostly populated by members of the Cumberland Presbyterian Church. The church leaders recognized the need for its congregation to be literate, and Canehill School was established in 1834. By 1850 it had been renamed to Canehill Collegiate Institute and was capable of granting two-year degrees. Two years later the Arkansas Legislature made Cane Hill College the second college in the state, one day after Arkansas College.

Cane Hill College was burned by Union forces during the American Civil War, with only a dormitory being used as a hospital surviving. The college reorganized after the war under the supervision of new president Dr. Fountain R. Earle. The Earles moved to Canehill in 1858, but the college had trouble rebuilding after the war was over. Earle attempted to save the college by merging with the Canehill Female Academy, but pressure added by the new Arkansas Industrial University in Fayetteville caused the college to close in 1891.

== Architecture ==
The building exhibits Greek Revival architecture and is one of the few remaining buildings in Canehill to demonstrate a classically proportioned front.
