= E.W. McClellan House =

Historic house in Arkansas, United States

- E. W. McClellan House
- U.S. National Register of Historic Places
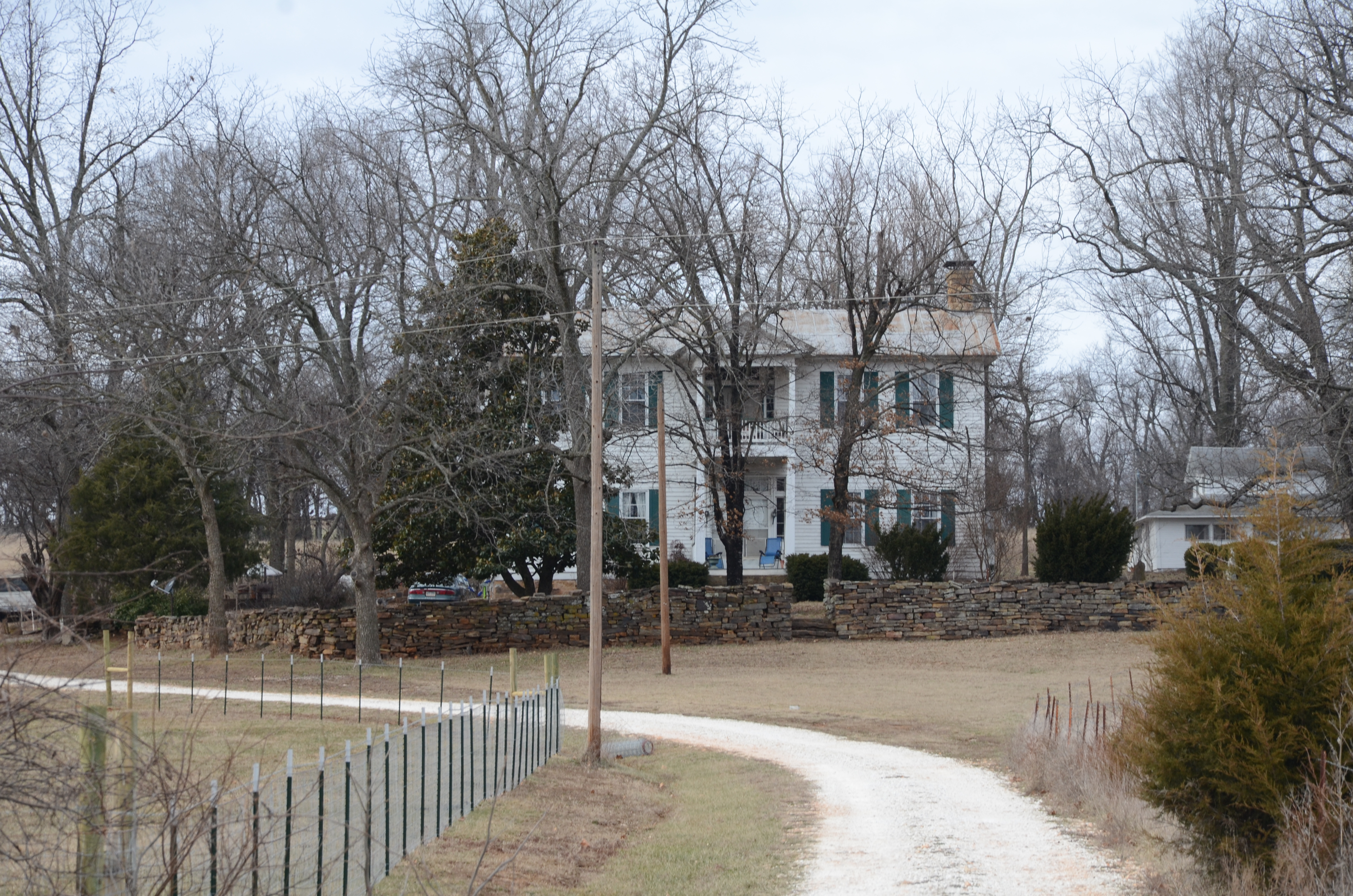

- Location within Arkansas Location within the United States
- Nearest city: Canehill, Arkansas
- Area: 2.5 acres (1.0 ha)
- Built: 1866
- Architectural style: Greek Revival
- MPS: Canehill MRA
- NRHP reference No.: 82000949
- Added to NRHP: November 17, 1982

The E.W. McClellan House is a historic house a short way southwest of the center of Canehill, Arkansas, off Arkansas Highway 45. The house is a two-story I-house, with a side gable roof and a prominent two-story gable-roofed portico at the center of its front facade. Its main entrance is flanked by sidelight windows and topped by a transom. Despite a post-Civil War construction date (c. 1866), the building features pre-war Greek Revival styling. There are 20th-century additions to the rear of the house.

E. W. McClellan was a merchant who moved to Western Arkansas in 1833. He was a member of the board of trustees of Cane Hill College.

The house was listed on the National Register of Historic Places in 1982.

== See also ==
- National Register of Historic Places listings in Washington County, Arkansas
