= Fontaine Richard Earle =

College president, education official (1831 - 1908)

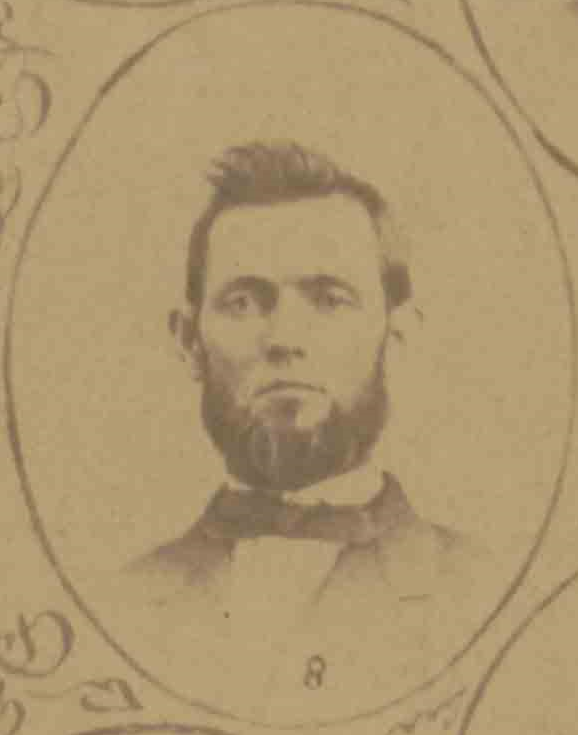
Fontaine Richard Earle - Arkansas Senate 1866-1867

Fontaine Richard Earle (January 9, 1831 - September 6, 1908) was an officer in the Confederate Army during the American Civil War, a Presbyterian minister, a college president, and a state legislator in Arkansas.

== Biography ==
He was born January 9, 1831, in Pond River, Kentucky, to Jane Woodson and Samuel Baylis Earle. He graduated from Cumberland University with a degree in arts and divinity in 1858. He moved to Cane Hill in 1858. His home was listed on the National Register of Historic Places as the Greek Revival Earle House. It was constructed in 1859. It subsequently deteriorated and the only remains are some foundations and chimneys.

In the American Civil War he served as a major for the Confederate States Army in the 34th Arkansas Infantry Regiment. He was in command of the 34th at the Battle of Jenkins' Ferry.

After the war, Earle returned to Cane Hill and married Amanda Buchanan, a teacher. He was elected to the Arkansas Senate to represent the third senatorial district (Washington, Arkansas), and served from 1866 to 1867. He was Arkansas' first Secretary of Education and served as president of Cane Hill College until it closed in 1892. His grammar book, The English Grammar, was published in 1867. He was a Presbyterian preacher for 50 years.

Earle died September 6, 1908, at his home in Cane Hill from dropsy. His wife had preceded him and died in 1894.

== Notes ==
The University of Arkansas has papers related to him including an interview with him. A collection of his sermons, letters, and clippings was published in 1999 from the collection called the Fontaine Richard Earle Papers.
