= Arkansas Highway 303 =

State highway in Arkansas, United States

Highway 303

Route information
- Maintained by ArDOT
- Existed: April 24, 1963–present

Section 1
- Length: 1.763 mi (2.837 km)
- South end: CR 6245
- North end: AR 74 east of Wesley

Section 2
- Length: 8.567 mi (13.787 km)
- South end: AR 45 at Mayfield
- North end: CR 98

Section 3
- Length: 2.27 mi (3.65 km)
- South end: AR 12 in Hobbs State Park – Conservation Area
- North end: CR 99

Location
- Country: United States
- State: Arkansas
- Counties: Benton, Madison, Washington

Highway system
- Arkansas Highway System; Interstate; US; State; Business; Spurs; Suffixed; Scenic; Heritage
← AR 302	→ AR 304

Highway 303 (AR 303, Ark. 303, and Hwy. 303) is a designation shared by three north–south state highways in Northwest Arkansas. Each connects sparsely populated rural areas to east–west corridors.

== Route description ==
=== Madison County ===
Highway 303 begins at Lollar's Creek Road (Madison CR 192) and runs northwest to terminate at Highway 74 east of Wesley.

=== Washington County ===
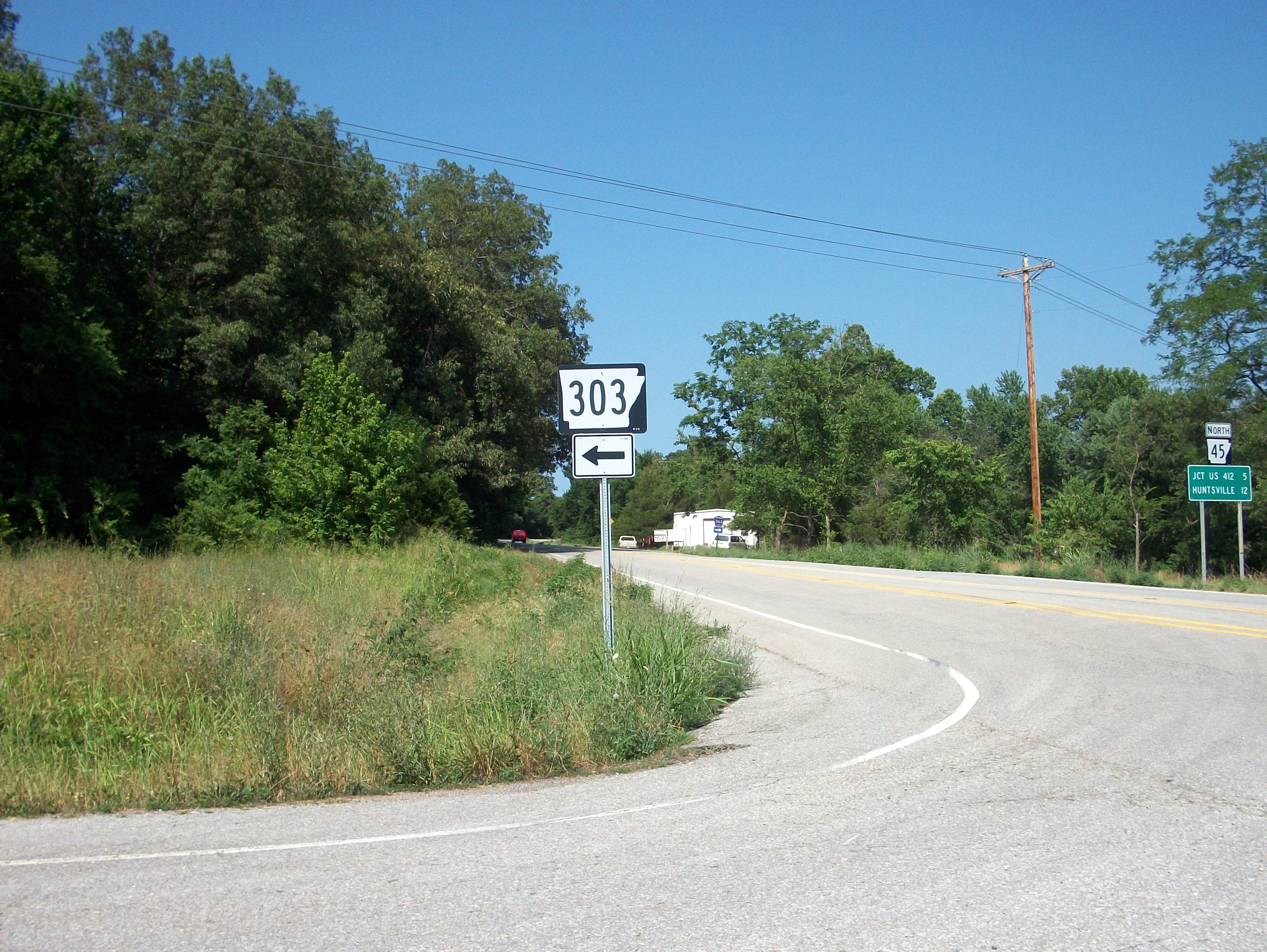
Highway 303 begins at Highway 45 at Mayfield

Highway 303 begins at Highway 45 at Mayfield and runs north through unincorporated Washington County to meet US Route 412 at Spring Valley near the historic Spring Valley School. The two routes participate in a 1 mile (1.6 km) concurrency east until Highway 303 turns north from US 412 near the Madison County line. The route then runs north towards War Eagle and becomes Benton CR 98 which eventually gives access to Highway 12 near Beaver Lake.

=== Benton County ===
Highway 303 begins at Highway 12, angling northeast before terminating at Rocky Branch Road (Benton CR 99) near the Rocky Branch School and Beaver Lake.

== History ==
Highway 303 was added to the state highway system as part of a large transfer of county roads to the state system that took place on April 24, 1963. Initially only the portion from Mayfield to the Benton County line was transferred to state maintenance.

== Major intersections ==
Mile markers reset at concurrencies.

County	Location	mi	km	Destinations	Notes
Madison		0.000	0.000	End state maintenance, roadway continues as CR 6245 (Lollar's Creek Road)	Southern terminus
Madison		1.763	2.837	AR 74 – Fayetteville, Huntsville	Northern terminus
Gap in route
Washington	Mayfield	0.00	0.00	AR 45	Southern terminus
Washington	Spring Valley	3.533– 0.000	5.686– 0.000	US 412 – Springdale, Huntsville	
Washington–Benton county line		5.034	8.101	End state maintenance, roadway continues as CR 98 (High Sky Inn Road)	Northern terminus
Gap in route
Benton	Hobbs State Park – Conservation Area	0.000	0.000	AR 12 – Rogers	Southern terminus
Benton		2.263	3.642	End state maintenance, roadway continues as CR 99 (Rocky Branch Road)	Northern terminus
1.000 mi = 1.609 km; 1.000 km = 0.621 mi: Concurrency terminus

== See also ==
- List of state highways in Arkansas
