= Slayton =

Slayton may refer to:

== People with the given name ==
- Slayton A. Evans, Jr. (1943–2001), American chemist

== People with the surname ==
- Chris Slayton (born 1995), American football player
- Darius Slayton (born 1997), American football player
- Deke Slayton (1924–1993), one of the original 7 Mercury astronauts
- Bobby Slayton (born 1955), American comedian
- John W. Slayton (1861–1935), American socialist lecturer and politician
- Paul Wall (born Paul Slayton in 1981), American rapper
- Helen Slayton-Hughes (1930-2022), American actress

== Places ==
United States

- Slayton, Minnesota, a city
- Slaytonville, Arkansas, an unincorporated community
