= Spring Valley, Arkansas =

Spring Valley, Arkansas may refer to:

- Spring Valley, Lonoke County, Arkansas
- Spring Valley, Pulaski County, Arkansas
- Spring Valley, Washington County, Arkansas

or

- Valley Springs, Arkansas
