= Pyeatte Mill Site =

- U.S. National Register of Historic Places
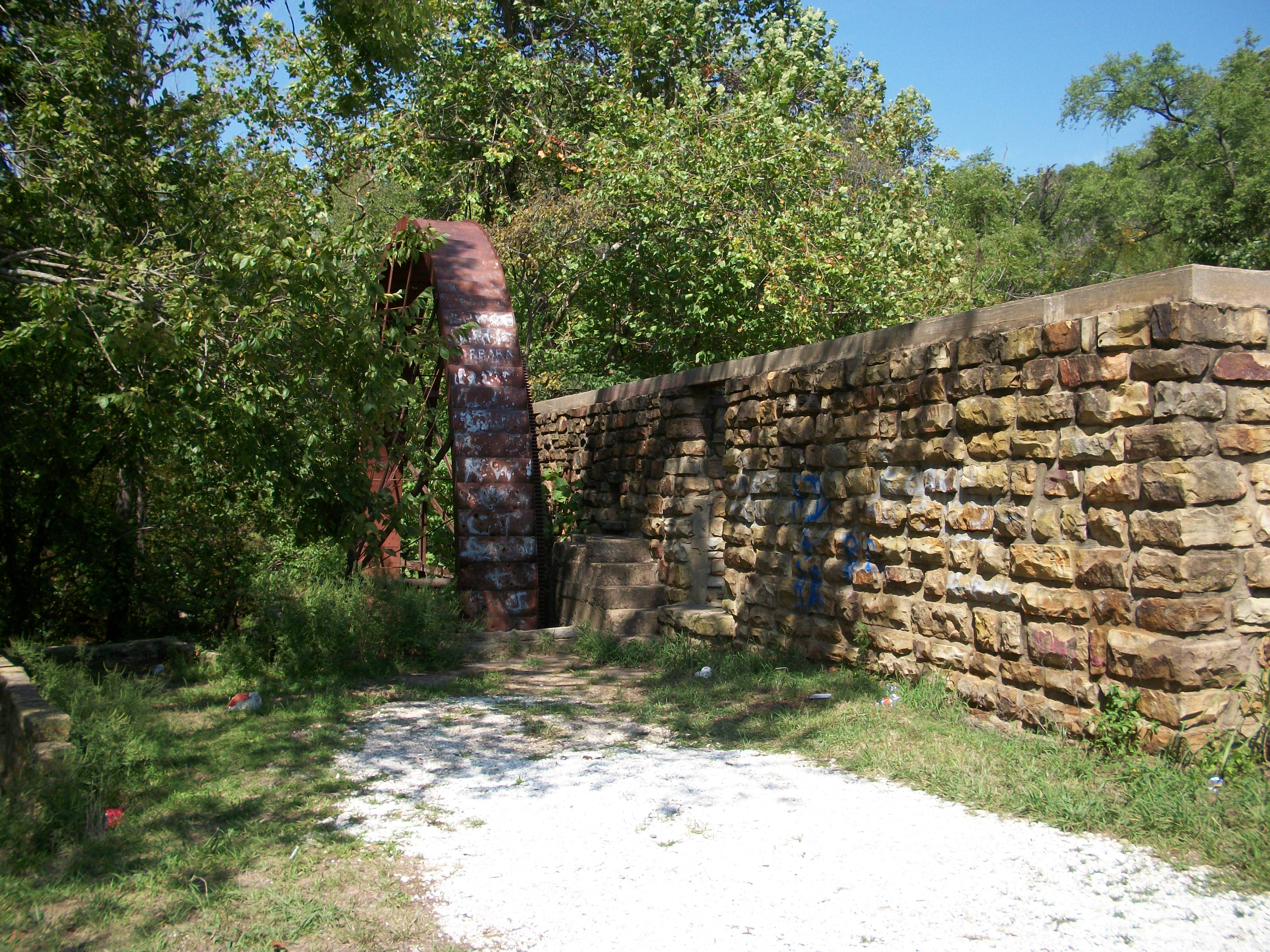

- Location within Arkansas Location within the United States
- Nearest city: Canehill, Arkansas
- Coordinates: 35°53′54″N 94°24′7″W
- Area: 7 acres (2.8 ha)
- Built: 1902
- MPS: Canehill MRA
- NRHP reference No.: 82000954
- Added to NRHP: November 17, 1982

The Pyeatte Mill Site is a roadside park encompassing the remains of a historic early 20th-century mill facility on Arkansas Highway 45 in Canehill, Arkansas. The principal surviving features are a large stone foundation wall and a massive steel wheel 36 feet (11 m) in diameter. These are all that remain of what was once Canehill's leading 19th-century industrial facility, which had its origins in the 1830s. It operated at this site from 1902 into the 1920s.

The site was listed on the National Register of Historic Places in 1982.

== See also ==
- National Register of Historic Places listings in Washington County, Arkansas
