= Arkansas College =

Arkansas College may refer to the following in the United States:

- Arkansas College (Fayetteville, Arkansas), 1850–1862
- Arkansas College, the original name of Lyon College in Batesville, founded in 1872
