= Cane Hill Cemetery =

Historic cemetery in Arkansas, United States

- Canehill Cemetery
- U.S. National Register of Historic Places
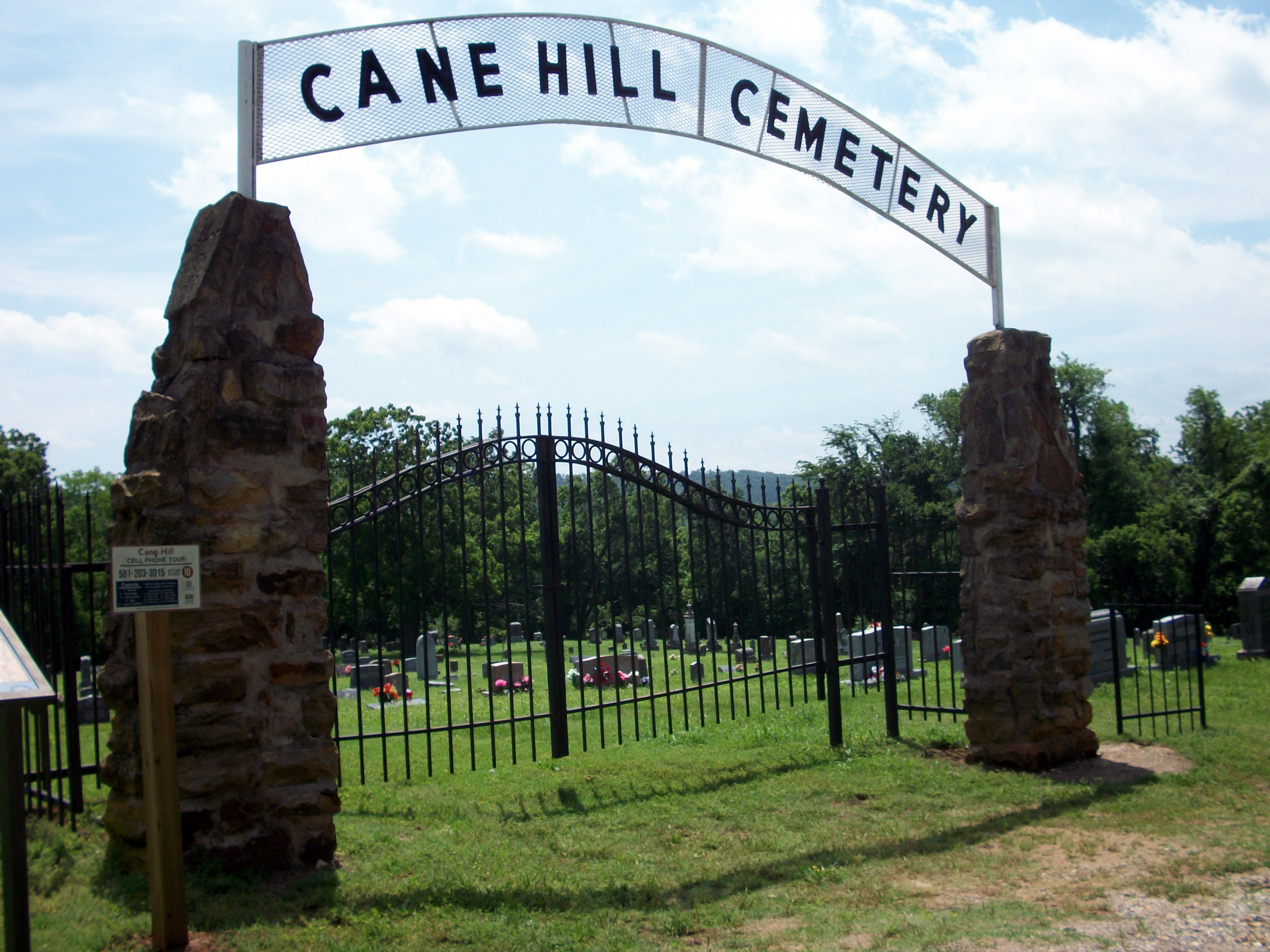

- Location within Arkansas Location within the United States
- Location: CR 13, Canehill, Arkansas
- Coordinates: 35°54′50″N 94°23′55″W
- Area: 5 acres (2.0 ha)
- MPS: Canehill MRA
- NRHP reference No.: 82000941
- Added to NRHP: November 17, 1982

The Cane Hill Cemetery is a cemetery in Canehill, Arkansas. It is located just south of Washington County Route 13 and west of Arkansas Highway 45.

== History ==
The Cane Hill area was settled in the late 1820s. The cemetery contains the graves of two of its first settlers, Thomas Garvin (d. 1834) and Thomas Buchanan (d. 1836), and is the site of the community's first church and schoolhouse. The Cane Hill area was the site of the Battle of Cane Hill, a running battle fought a few days before the Battle of Prairie Grove in November 1862. James G. Blunt and his Union troops captured approximately 2,000 Confederate soldiers in November 1862. The cemetery contains many Civil War-era burials.

The cemetery was listed on the National Register of Historic Places in 1982.

== See also ==
- National Register of Historic Places listings in Washington County, Arkansas
