= Zeb Edmiston House =

Historic house in Arkansas, United States

- U.S. National Register of Historic Places
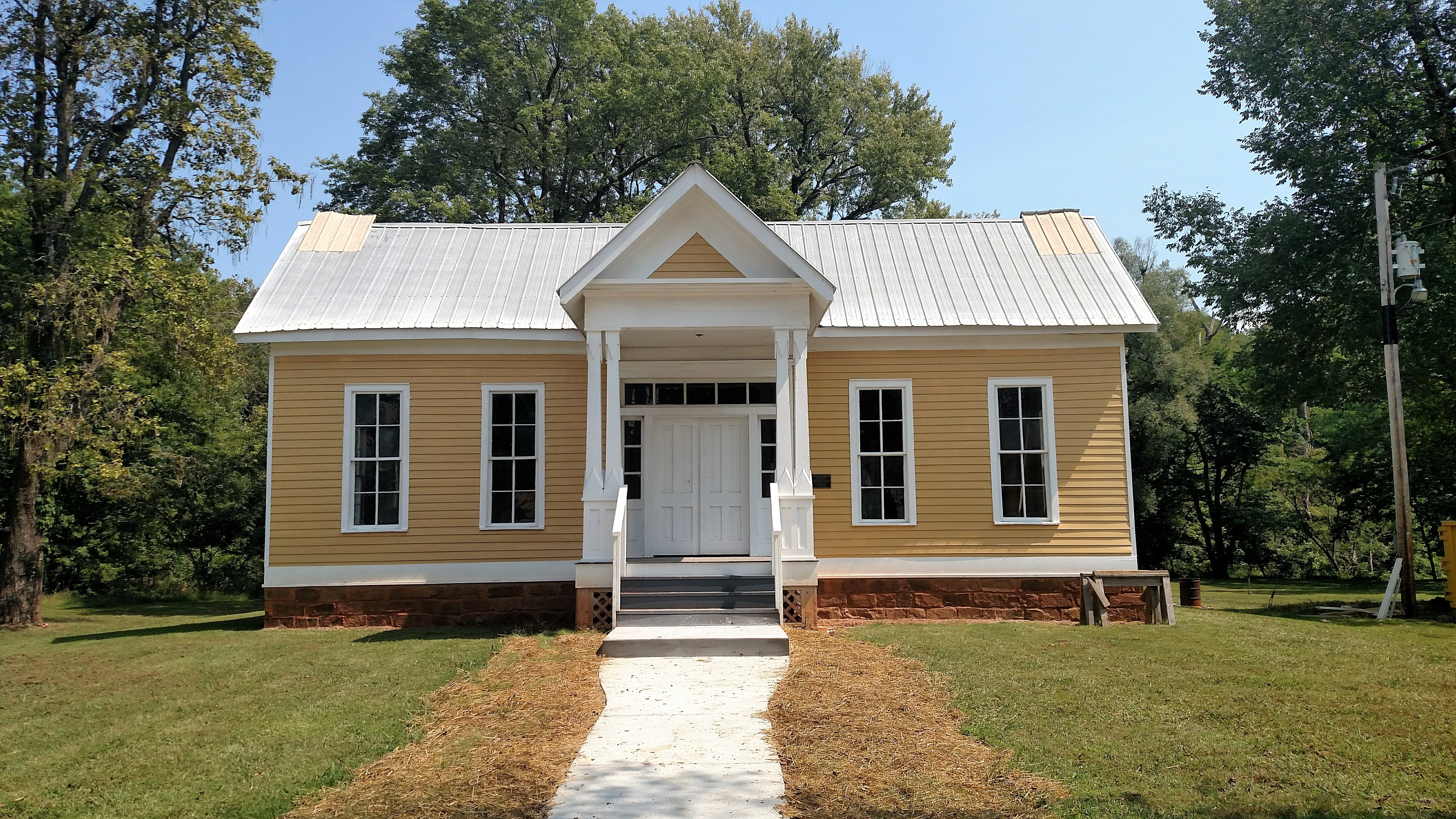

- Location within Arkansas Location within the United States
- Location: 14340 South Highway 45; Cane Hill, Arkansas
- Coordinates: 35°54′30″N 94°23′45″W
- Area: less than one acre
- Built: 1872
- Architectural style: Classical Revival
- MPS: Canehill MRA
- NRHP reference No.: 82000948
- Added to NRHP: November 17, 1982

The Zeb Edmiston House is a historic house in Cane Hill, Arkansas. It is a single-story wood-frame structure, with a side gable roof, weatherboard siding, and a stone foundation. An ell extends to the rear from the center, and a gable-roofed portico extends over the front entry, supported by decorative classically inspired posts mounted on paneled pedestals. The house, built in 1872, harkened back to the Greek Revival which was popular before the American Civil War. It was built by a local businessman from the prominent Edmiston family.

The house was listed on the National Register of Historic Places in 1982. It was purchased by Historic Cane Hill, Inc., a non-profit seeking to restore historic and cultural sites in Cane Hill, in July 2015. The property has since been restored. It has historically been subject to inundation by Jordan Creek, which crosses the back of the property, during major rain events. The entire property is located within the 100-year floodplain, according to the Federal Emergency Management Agency.

== See also ==
- National Register of Historic Places listings in Washington County, Arkansas
