= Bethlehem Cemetery =

Historic cemetery in Arkansas, United States

- U.S. National Register of Historic Places
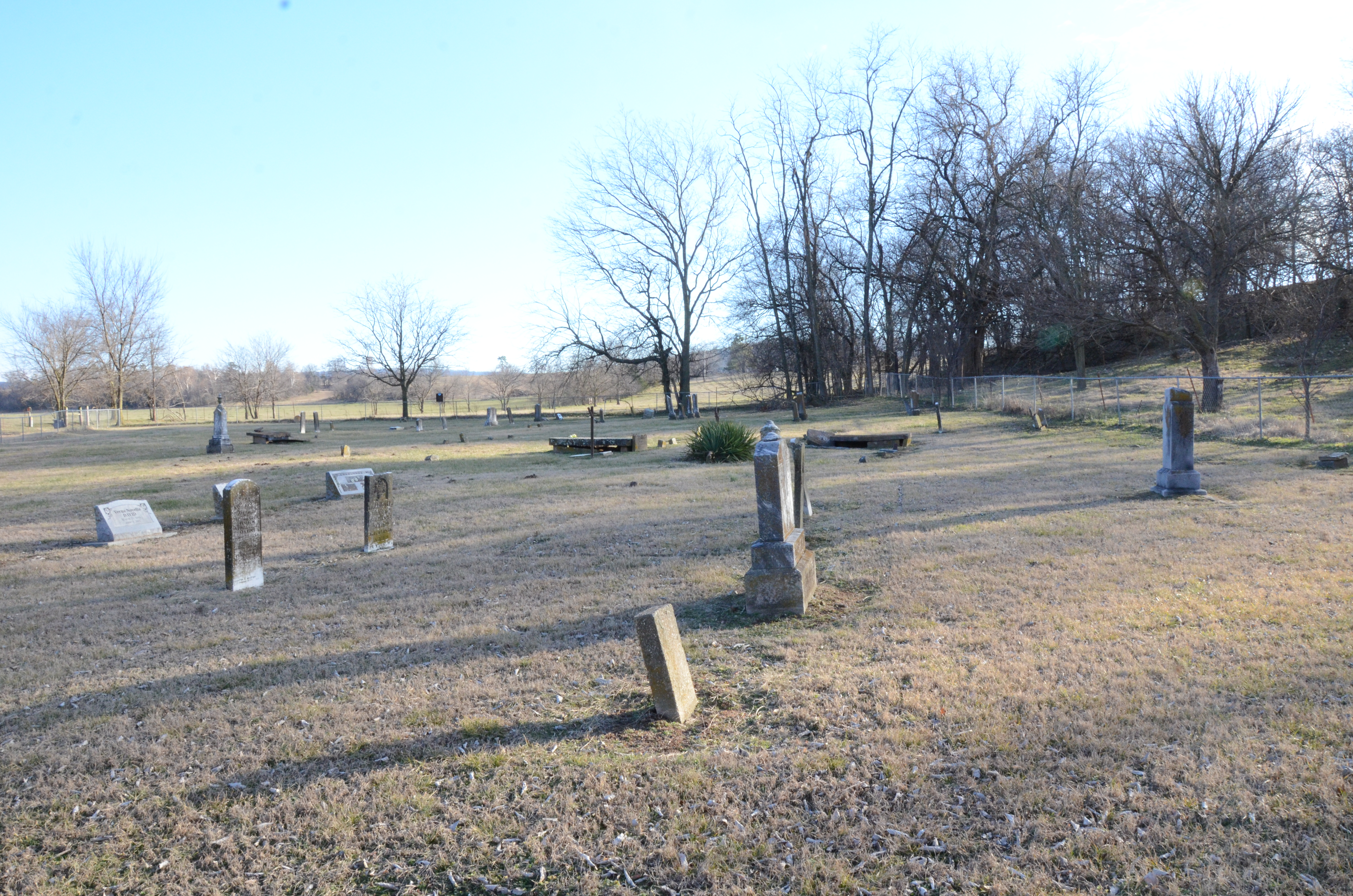

- Location within Arkansas Location within the United States
- Nearest city: Canehill, Arkansas
- Coordinates: 35°52′6″N 94°27′32″W
- Area: 2 acres (0.81 ha)
- Built: 1832
- NRHP reference No.: 00001365
- Added to NRHP: November 15, 2000

The Bethlehem Cemetery is a historic cemetery in rural Washington County, Arkansas, United States. It is located about 4 miles (6.4 km) south of Canehill, near the junction of Arkansas Highway 45 and County Road 442. With its first documented burial in 1832, it is one of the oldest cemeteries in the county, and it is the only surviving remnant of the small frontier community of Bethlehem, which was established in 1827. The cemetery contains the remains of some of the area's earliest settlers, including the wife of preacher John Carnahan, who is believed to be the first person buried in the cemetery.

The cemetery was listed on the National Register of Historic Places in 2000.

== See also ==
- National Register of Historic Places listings in Washington County, Arkansas
