= A.R. Carroll Building =

- A. R. Carroll Building
- U.S. National Register of Historic Places
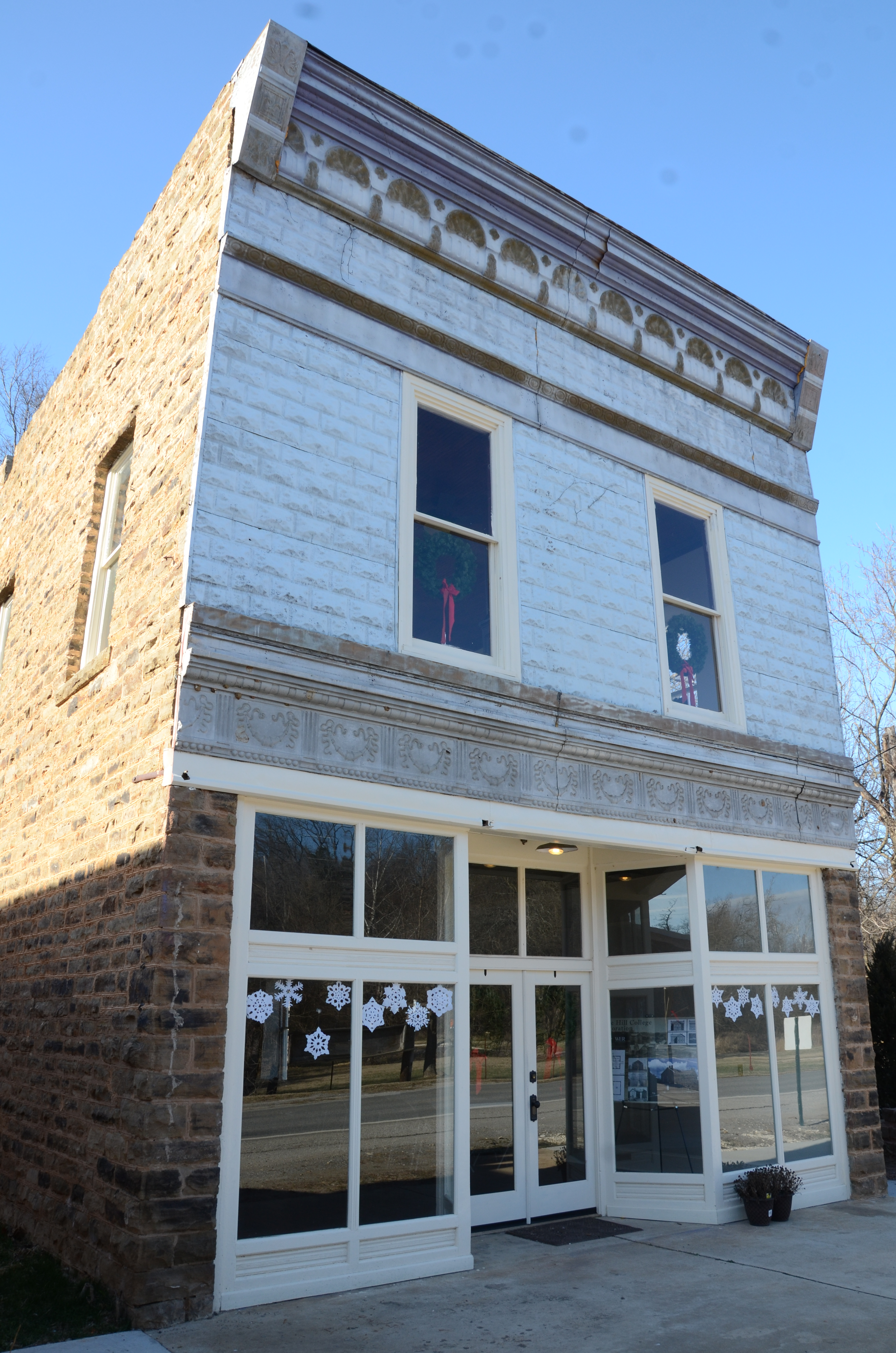

- Location within Arkansas Location within the United States
- Location: Main St., Canehill, Arkansas
- Coordinates: 35°54′32″N 94°23′48″W
- Area: less than one acre
- Built: 1900
- MPS: Canehill MRA
- NRHP reference No.: 82000944
- Added to NRHP: November 17, 1982

The A.R. Carroll Building is a historic commercial building on Main Street in Canehill, Arkansas. It is a two-story masonry structure, with a flat roof and a pressed metal facade on the upper level. The metal was fabricated to resemble brick, and includes an elaborate parapet. Built in 1900, the building is the finest commercial building of the period to survive in the community; it originally housed a drugstore.

The building was listed on the National Register of Historic Places in 1982.

== See also ==
- National Register of Historic Places listings in Washington County, Arkansas
