= Blackburn House (Canehill, Arkansas) =

Historic house in Arkansas, United States

- U.S. National Register of Historic Places
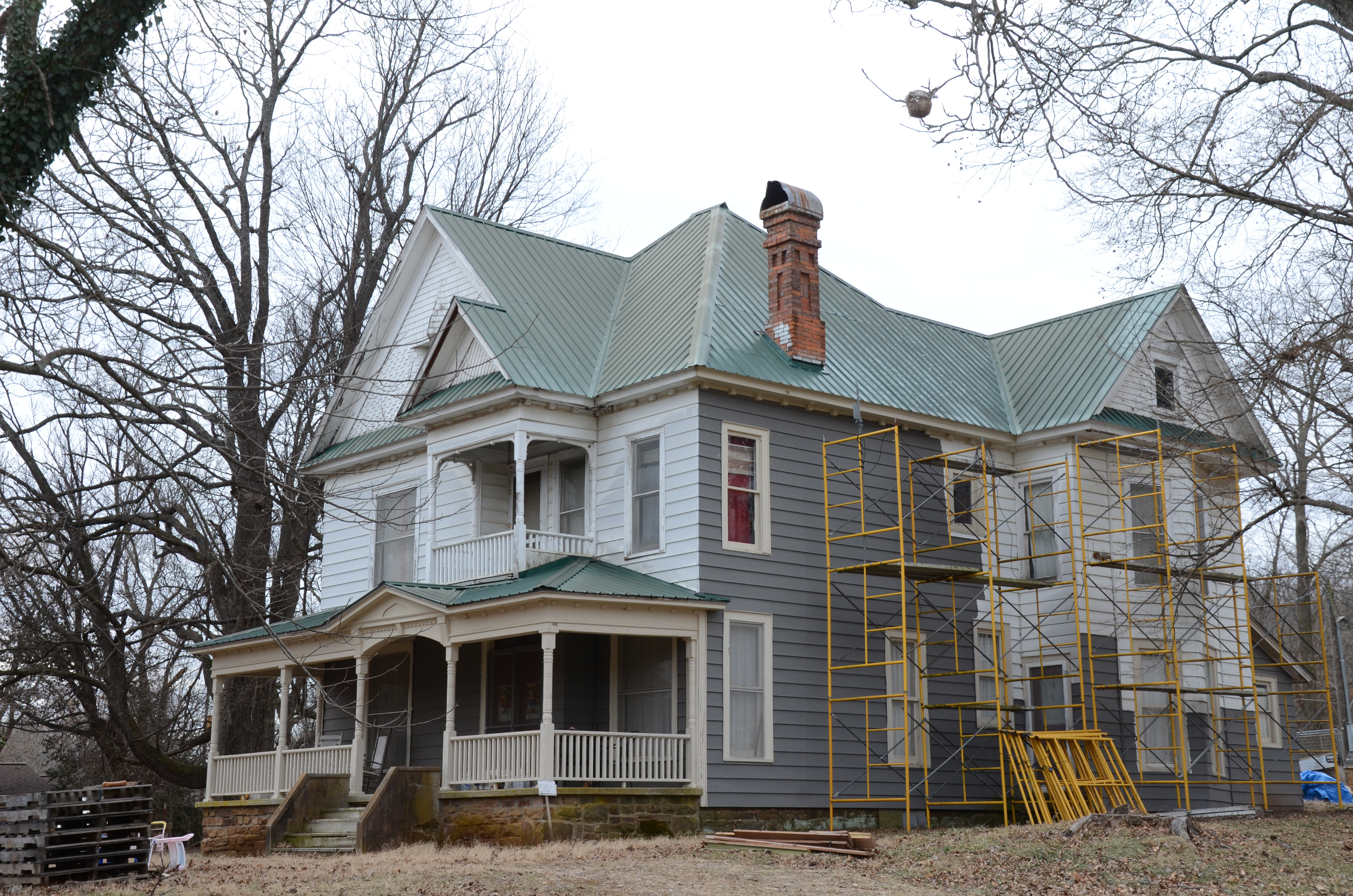

- Location within Arkansas Location within the United States
- Location: Main at College Sts., Canehill, Arkansas
- Coordinates: 35°54′37″N 94°23′46″W
- Area: less than one acre
- Built: 1898
- Architectural style: Colonial Revival, Queen Anne
- MPS: Canehill MRA
- NRHP reference No.: 82000940
- Added to NRHP: November 17, 1982

The Blackburn House is a historic house at Main and College Streets in Canehill, Arkansas. It is a 2 1/2-story wood-frame structure, with a cross-gable hip roof and a stone foundation. The house has the asymmetrical massing and decorative wood shingle siding in its gables that are characteristic of Queen Anne architecture, and shed-roof porch extending across its main facade, supported by box columns. The porch has a gabled pediment above the stairs leading to the main entrance, and a symmetry more typical of the Colonial Revival. Built in 1898 by a local doctor, this house is a well-preserved local example of this transitional form.

The house was listed on the National Register of Historic Places in 1988.

== See also ==
- National Register of Historic Places listings in Washington County, Arkansas
