= Methodist Manse =

Historic house in Arkansas, United States

- U.S. National Register of Historic Places
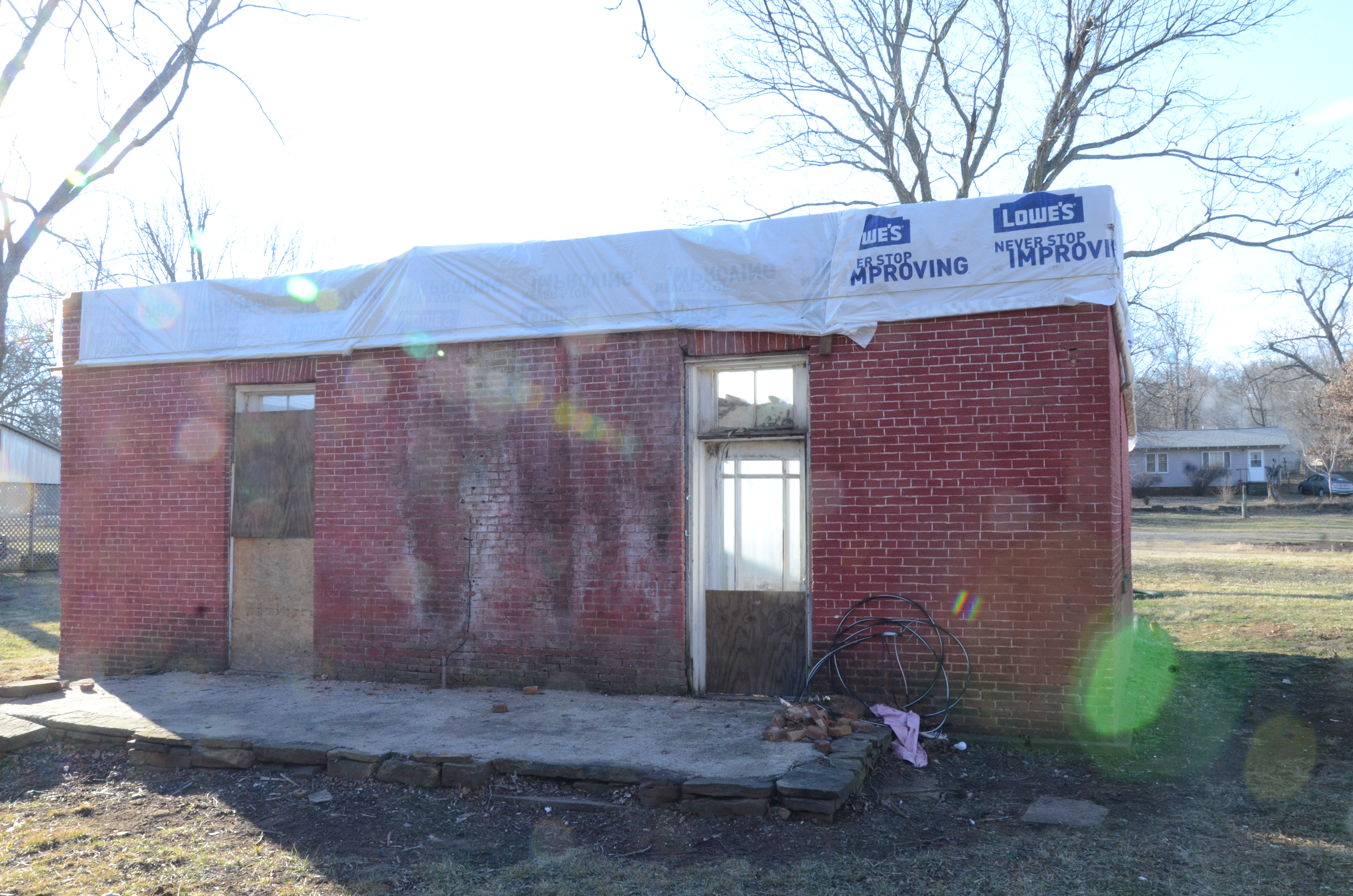

- Location within Arkansas Location within the United States
- Location: Main and Spring Sts., Canehill, Arkansas
- Coordinates: 35°54′29″N 94°23′48″W
- Area: less than one acre
- Built: 1834
- Architectural style: Federal, Federal influence
- MPS: Canehill MRA
- NRHP reference No.: 82000950
- Added to NRHP: November 17, 1982

The Methodist Manse is a historic house at Spring and Main Streets in Canehill, Arkansas. Built in 1834, this single-story brick structure served as the town's first Methodist church building, and was converted to its minister's house when the new wood-frame church was built in the 1850s. It is one of the community's most significant pre-Civil War buildings.

The house was listed on the National Register of Historic Places in 1982.

== See also ==
- National Register of Historic Places listings in Washington County, Arkansas
