= D.N. Edmiston House =

Historic house in Arkansas, United States

- D. N. Edmiston House
- U.S. National Register of Historic Places
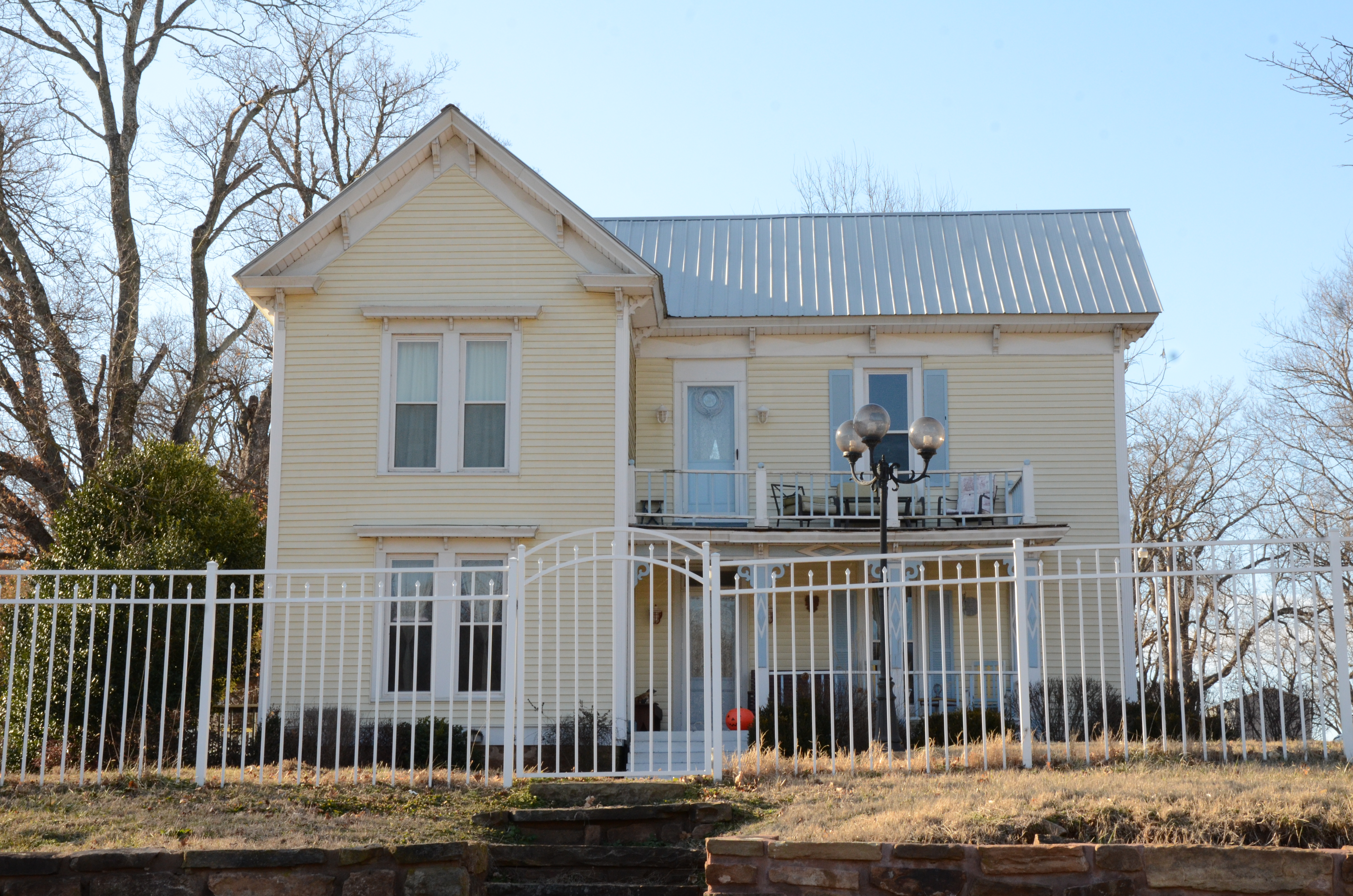

- Location within Arkansas Location within the United States
- Location: Main St., Canehill, Arkansas
- Coordinates: 35°54′39″N 94°23′45″W
- Area: less than one acre
- Built: 1886
- MPS: Canehill MRA
- NRHP reference No.: 82000946
- Added to NRHP: November 17, 1982

The D.N. Edmiston House is a historic house on Main Street in Canehill, Arkansas. It is a two-story wood-frame structure, with an L-shaped plan, cross gable roof, weatherboard siding, and a stone foundation. Its gable ends have decorative brackets, as do the cornice hoods above the windows. The porch also has decorative bracketed columns. The house was built in 1886 and is a distinctive local example of vernacular Victorian styling.

The house was listed on the National Register of Historic Places in 1982.

== See also ==
- National Register of Historic Places listings in Washington County, Arkansas
