= Hackett Creek Bridge =

- U.S. National Register of Historic Places
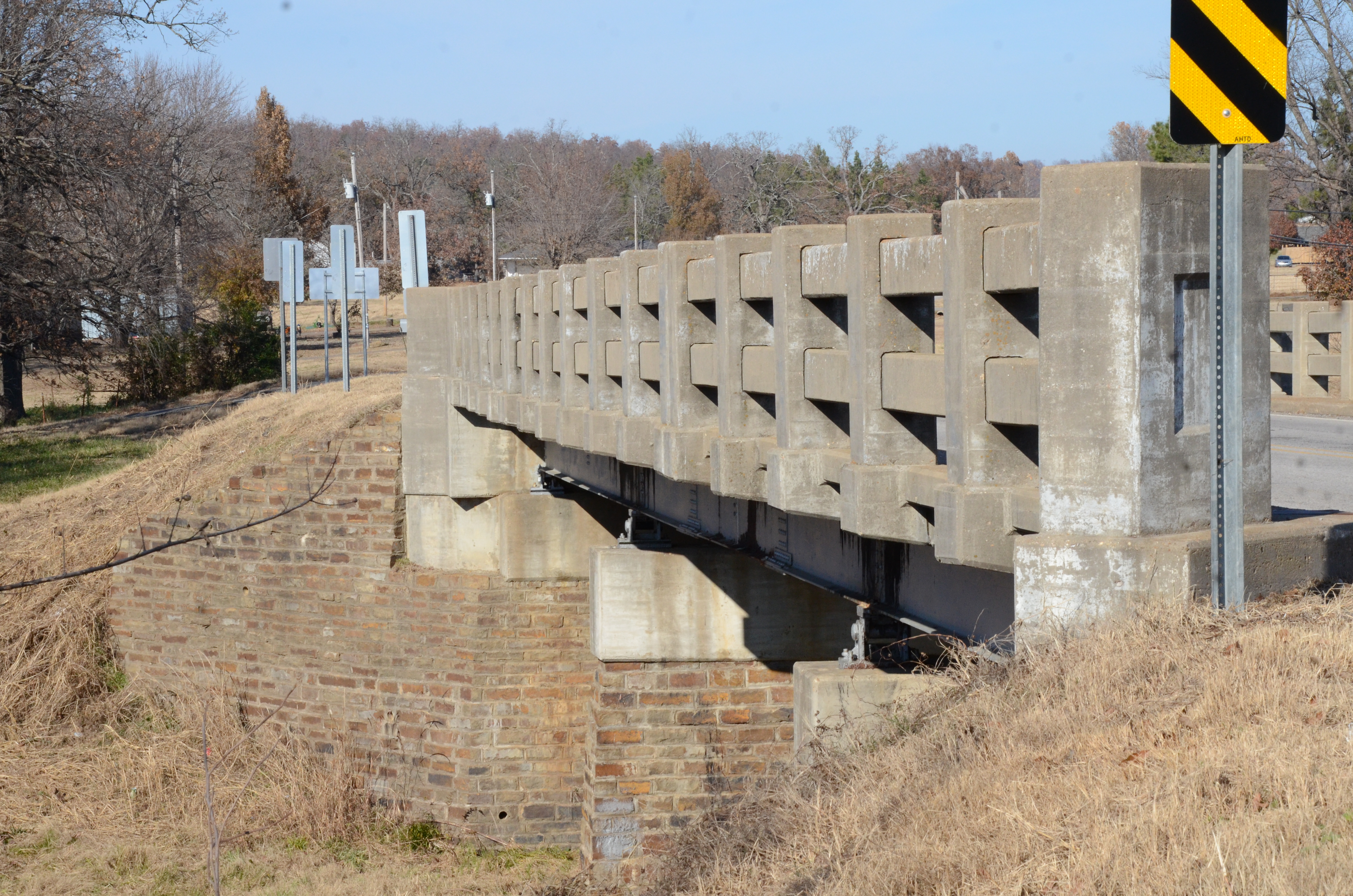

- Location within Arkansas Location within the United States
- Nearest city: Hackett, Arkansas
- Coordinates: 35°11′35″N 94°24′51″W
- Area: less than one acre
- Built: 1941
- Architectural style: Open Masonry Substructure
- MPS: Historic Bridges of Arkansas MPS
- NRHP reference No.: 95000568
- Added to NRHP: May 5, 1995

The Hackett Creek Bridge is a historic bridge near Hackett, Arkansas, which carries Arkansas Highway 45 across Hackett Creek. The bridge is a three-span concrete structure set on abutments and piers of stone and concrete. The longest single span is 36 feet (11 m) long, and the total bridge length is 98 feet (30 m). The deck is asphalt laid over concrete, and there are simple concrete railings on either side. Built in 1941, it is a well-preserved concrete bridge of the period.

The bridge was listed on the National Register of Historic Places in 1995.

== See also ==
- National Register of Historic Places listings in Sebastian County, Arkansas
- List of bridges on the National Register of Historic Places in Arkansas
