= William Baxter (clergyman) =

Second president of Arkansas College

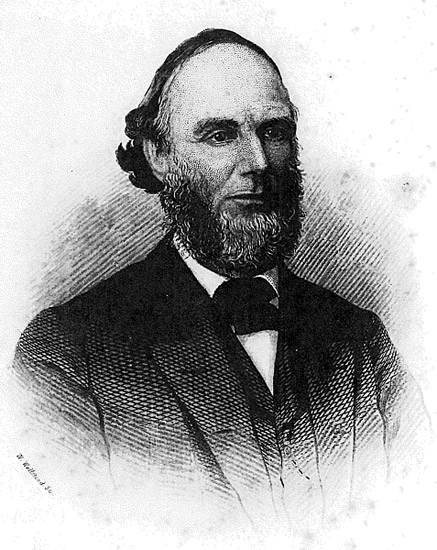
- Born: July 6, 1820; Leeds
- Died: February 11, 1880; New Castle
- Occupations: Clergyman, writer

William Baxter (July 6, 1820 – February 11, 1880) was an English-born American clergyman and author and second president of Arkansas College.

== Biography ==
William Baxter was born on July 6, 1820 in Leeds, Yorkshire, England. He came to the United States with his parents in 1828, was graduated at Bethany College in 1845, entered the Christian Church and preached in various places in Mississippi and Arkansas, until he became president of Arkansas College, in Fayetteville.

During the American Civil War the college was destroyed. In 1863 he removed to Cincinnati and devoted himself to preaching and literary work. He published a volume of poems in 1852, contributed largely to periodical literature, and has also aided in the preparation of several books, one of the most important being a large volume, The Loyal West in the Times of the Rebellion. Of his Pea Ridge and Prairie Grove, or Scenes and Incidents of the War in Arkansas, several editions were issued. His "War Lyrics," appearing originally in Harper's Weekly, became widely known and were recited at mass meetings by Murdoch and other popular elocutionists. His hymn "Let Me Go" appeared in many hymn-books and collections of sacred music.

William Baxter died on 11 February 1880 in New Castle, Pennsylvania.
