= Spring Valley School District 120 Building =

- U.S. National Register of Historic Places
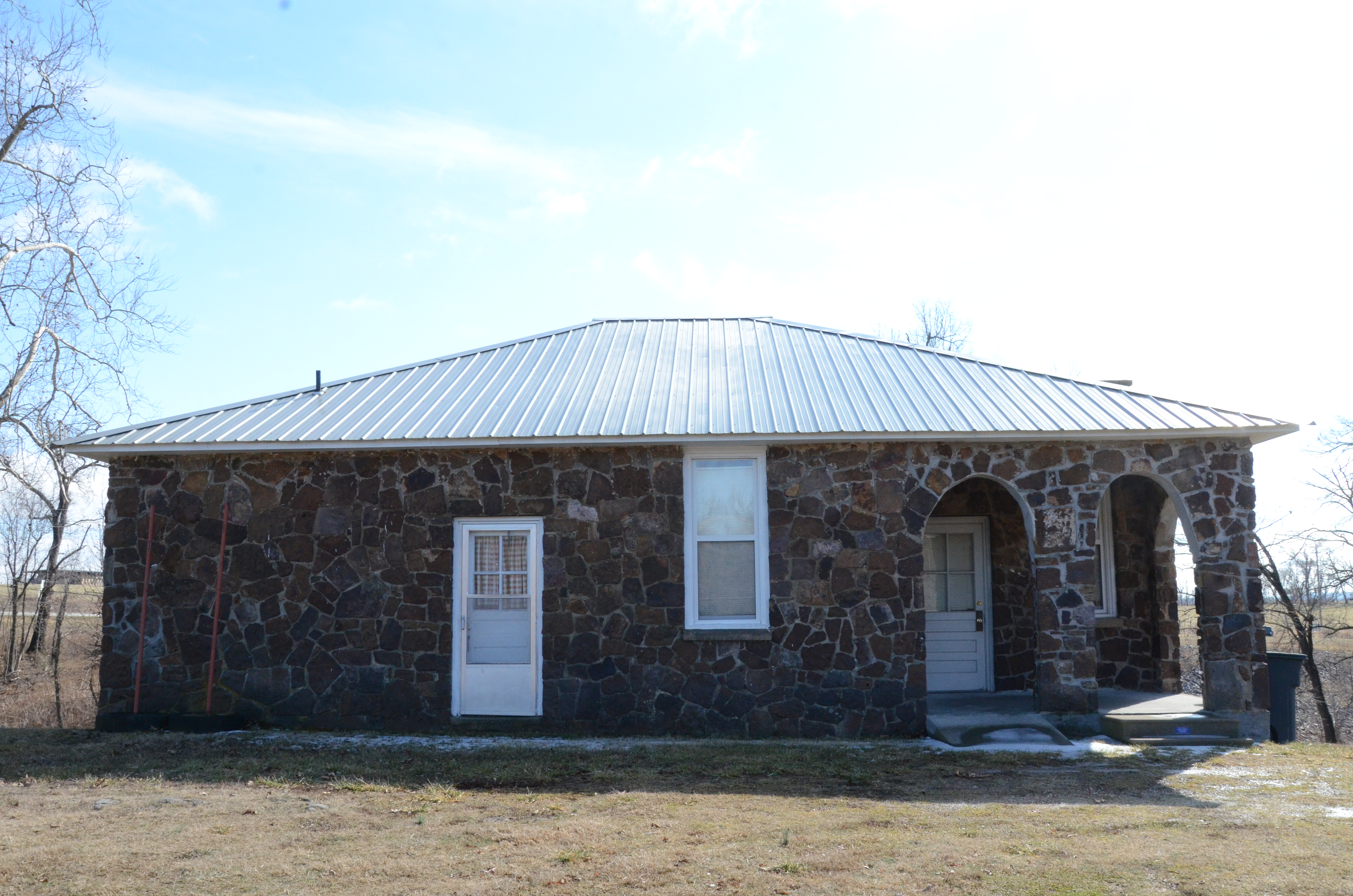

- Location within Arkansas Location within the United States
- Location: Co. Rd. 379, Spring Valley, Washington County, Arkansas
- Coordinates: 36°10′39″N 93°55′56″W
- Area: less than one acre
- Architect: O.H. Sullivan
- Architectural style: Late 19th And Early 20th Century American language Movements, Plain Conventional
- MPS: Public Schools in the Ozarks MPS
- NRHP reference No.: 92001119
- Added to NRHP: September 4, 1992

The Spring Valley School District 120 Building is a historic school building on County Road 379 in the small village of Spring Valley, Washington County, Arkansas, behind the Spring Valley Baptist Church. It is a single-story stone masonry structure with a hip roof and an entrance recessed under an arched corner porch. It was built in 1934, at the height of the Great Depression, apparently through local efforts, and is reflective of that period of public education in the Ozark region.

The building was listed on the National Register of Historic Places in 1992.

== See also ==
- National Register of Historic Places listings in Washington County, Arkansas
