= Rocky Branch School =

- U.S. National Register of Historic Places
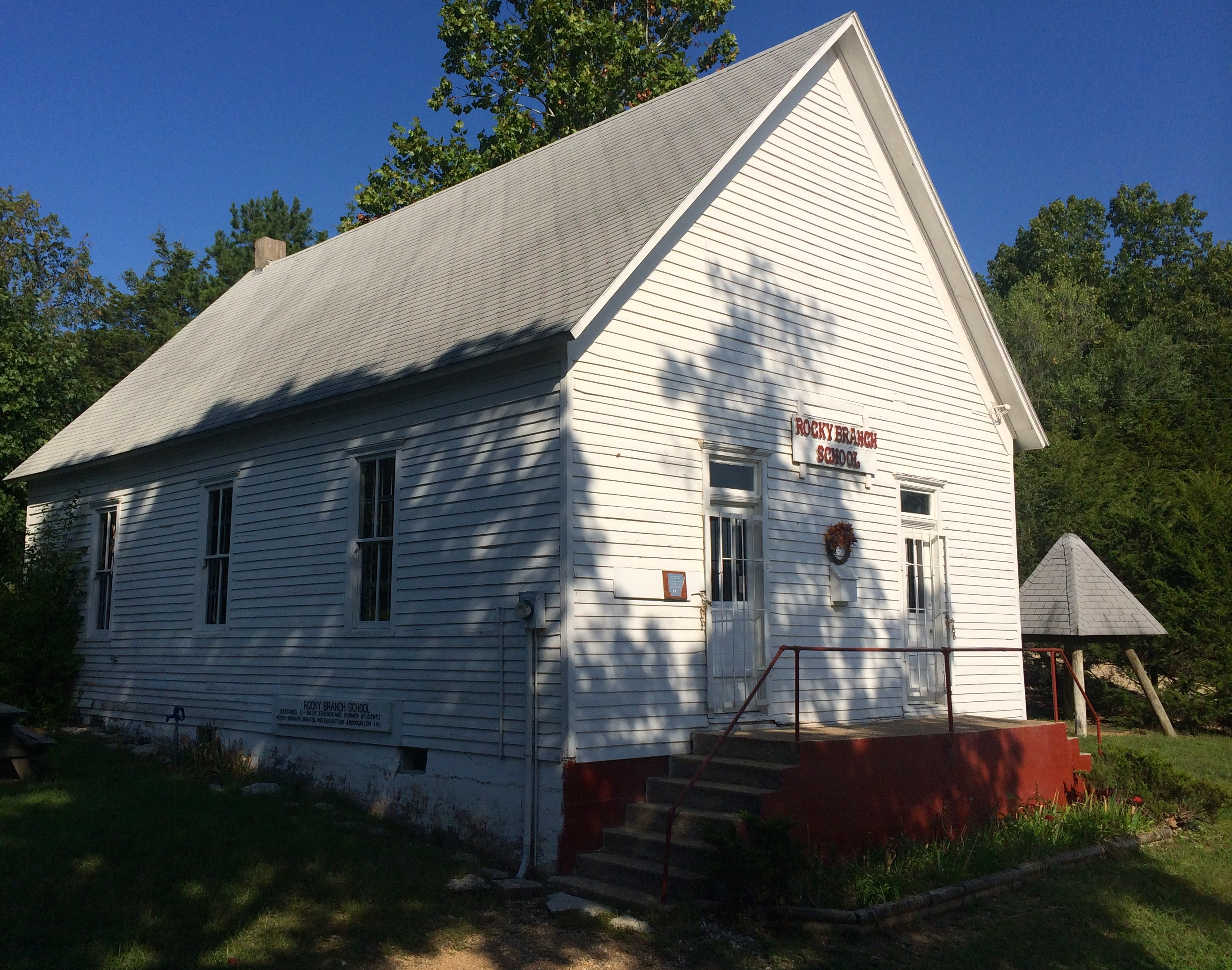

- Location within Arkansas Location within the United States
- Nearest city: Prairie Creek, Arkansas
- Coordinates: 36°19′34″N 93°56′29″W
- Area: less than one acre
- Built: 1914
- MPS: Benton County MRA
- NRHP reference No.: 87002360
- Added to NRHP: March 25, 1988

The Rocky Branch School is a historic school building in rural eastern Benton County, Arkansas. It is located at the northern terminus of Arkansas Highway 303, where it joins with County Roads 85 and 99 (the latter being Rocky Branch Road), and stands opposite the Rocky Branch Church. It is a one-room schoolhouse, with two doors facing east. The school was built c. 1914 in the community of La Rue, and was moved to its present site c. 1960 when that community was inundated by the creation of nearby Beaver Lake. It is a well-preserved example of a country district schoolhouse, with little alteration since its construction.

It was described as a "classic one-room school building."

The building was listed on the National Register of Historic Places in 1988.

== See also ==
- National Register of Historic Places listings in Benton County, Arkansas
