= John Edmiston House =

Historic house in Arkansas, United States

- U.S. National Register of Historic Places
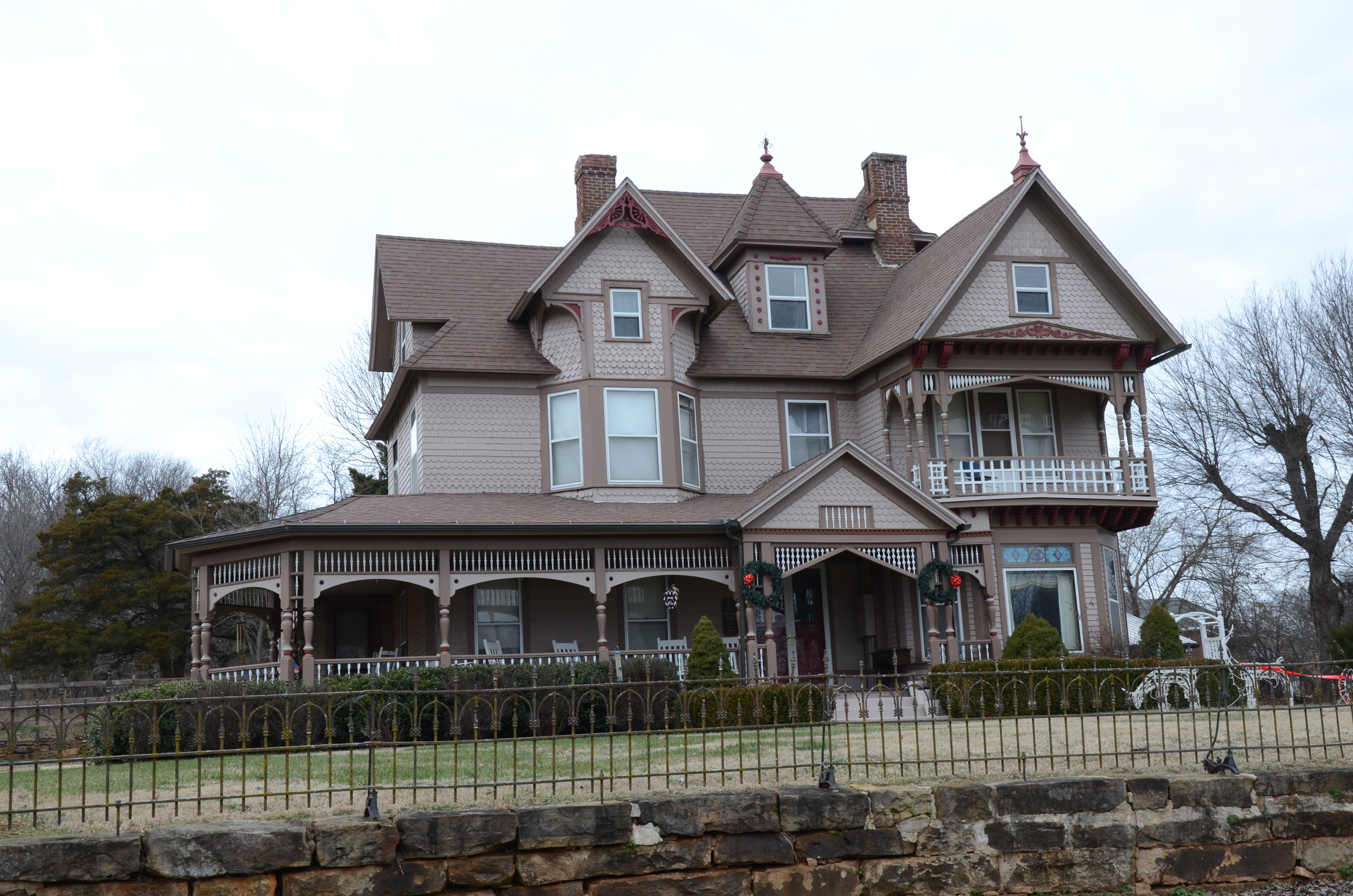

- Location within Arkansas Location within the United States
- Nearest city: Canehill, Arkansas
- Coordinates: 35°54′49″N 94°23′46″W
- Area: less than one acre
- Built: 1896
- Architectural style: Stick/eastlake, Queen Anne
- MPS: Canehill MRA
- NRHP reference No.: 82000947
- Added to NRHP: November 17, 1982

The John Edmiston House is a historic house on Main Street in Canehill, Arkansas. Built in 1896, this 2 1/2-story wood-frame structure is the small community's most architecturally elaborate Victorian house. It has asymmetrical massing and a busy and varied roofline, with numerous projections, gables, and porches, all characteristic of the Queen Anne and Eastlake styles. The builder, John Edmiston, was a prominent local businessman and banker.

The house was listed on the National Register of Historic Places in 1982.

== See also ==
- National Register of Historic Places listings in Washington County, Arkansas
