= Clyde, Arkansas =

- Unincorporated community
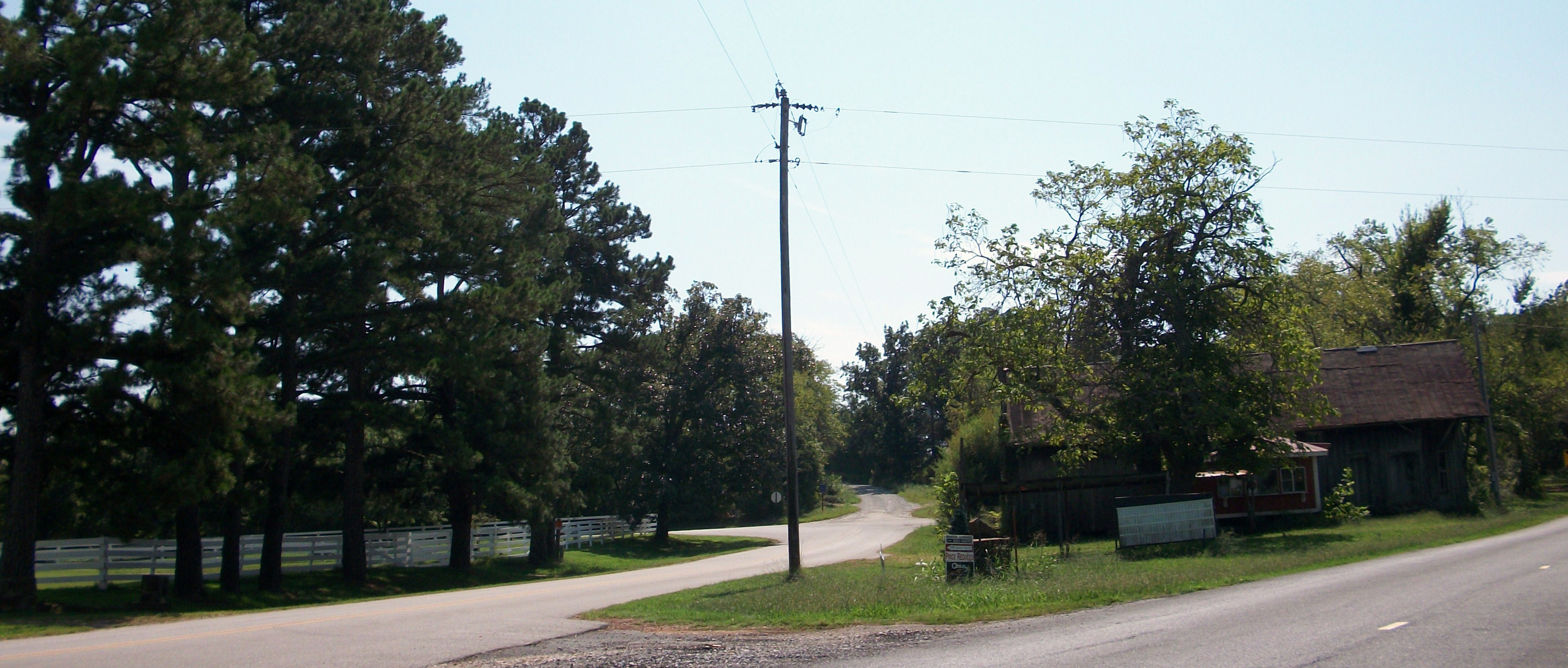
- Clyde at the intersection of AR 45 and Washington County Route 8.

- Clyde's position in Arkansas. Clyde, Arkansas (the United States)
- Coordinates: 35°53′29″N 94°24′24″W
- Country: United States
- State: Arkansas
- County: Washington
- Township: Cane Hill
- Elevation: 1,322 ft (403 m)
- Time zone: UTC-6 (Central (CST))
  - Summer (DST): UTC-5 (CDT)
- ZIP code: 72717
- Area code: 479
- GNIS feature ID: 76643

Clyde (historically Newtown) is an unincorporated community in Cane Hill Township, Washington County, Arkansas, United States. Clyde is on Arkansas Highway 45, approximately 26 miles southwest of Fayetteville and six miles east of the Oklahoma border.

Within the Canehill, Arkansas ZIP code (72717), the population of the ZCTA was 847 at the 2000 census. It is part of the Northwest Arkansas region.

A post office was established at Clyde in 1879, and closed the next year.
