= Cane Hill College =

- Canehill College Building
- U.S. National Register of Historic Places
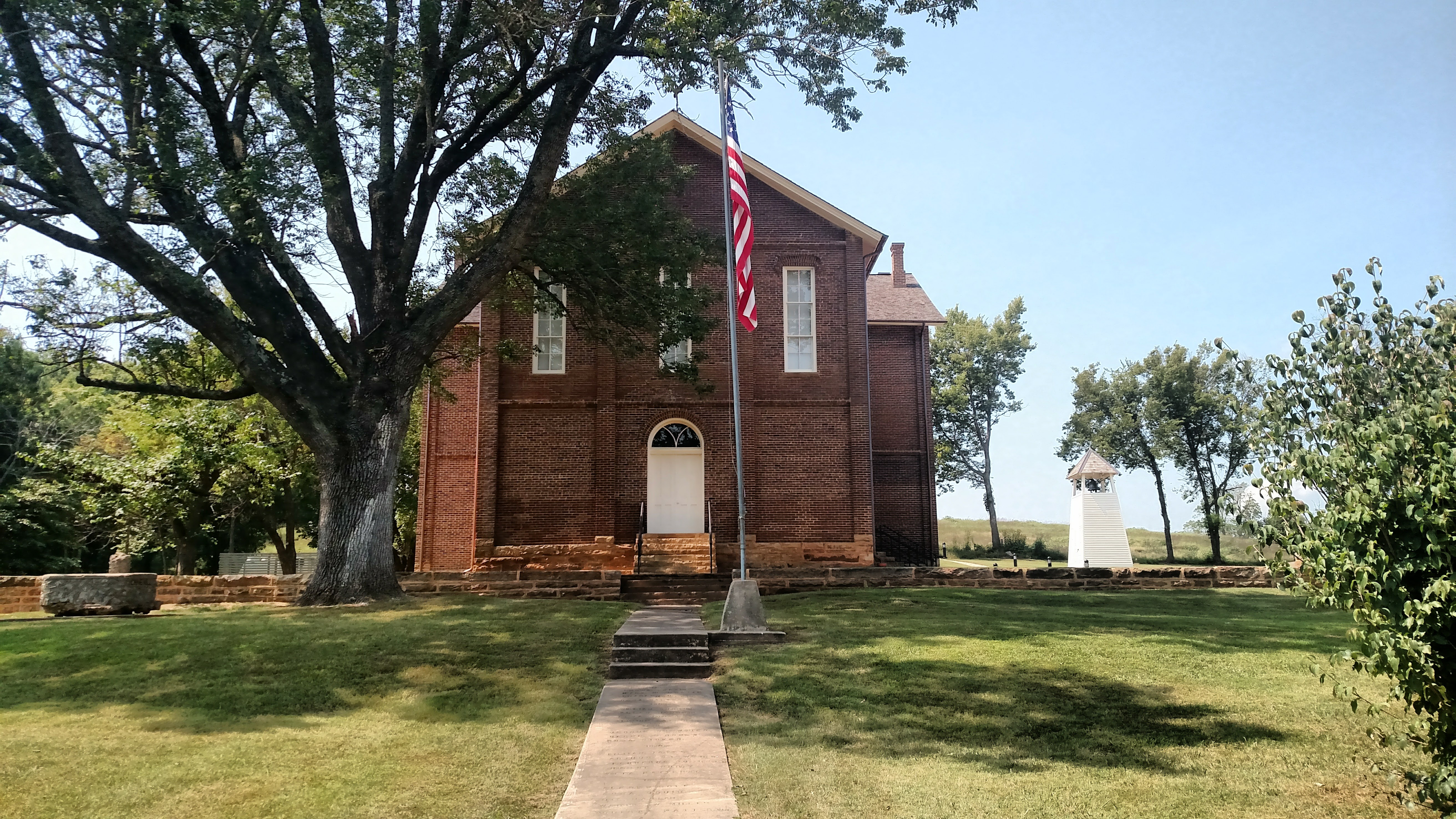
- Cane Hill College Building

- Location within Arkansas Location within the United States
- Location: McClellan and College St., Canehill, Arkansas
- Coordinates: 35.910833°N 94.3975°W
- Area: 2.8 acres (1.1 ha)
- Built: 1887
- Architectural style: Italianate
- MPS: Canehill MRA
- NRHP reference No.: 82000942
- Added to NRHP: November 17, 1982

Cane Hill College, originally Cane Hill School, was the first institution of higher learning in Arkansas. It operated in Canehill, Arkansas from 1834 until 1891.

== History ==
=== Cane Hill School (1834–1858) ===
Cumberland Presbyterians founded a school in Cane Hill, Arkansas at a meeting on October 28, 1834. The Cane Hill School opened in 1835 and served the Northwest Arkansas region until it was renamed and chartered as Cane Hill Collegiate Institute.

Cane Hill College became the third four-year institution in the state (after St. John's College and Arkansas College) on December 15, 1852 when an act was passed in the Arkansas Legislature. F. R. Earle ran the school from 1853 until its demise in 1891.

=== Cane Hill College (1858–1891) ===
Cane Hill College closed in 1861 during the American Civil War. After a Union victory at the Battle of Cane Hill in November 1862, federal soldiers occupied the town. In 1864, Union troops burned three of the four on-campus buildings. Only a dormitory survived. Cane Hill College reopened after the war and admitted its first female student in 1875 with the creation of the Female Department. The Female Department was absorbed into the rest of the college by 1877, and the college became coeducational.

Disaster struck the evening of October 10, 1885 when the entire college burned to the ground. Arson was suspected but never proven. The chartering of the new state college, Arkansas Industrial University in Fayetteville, was a crippling blow to Cane Hill College. It closed its doors forever in 1891.

== Today ==
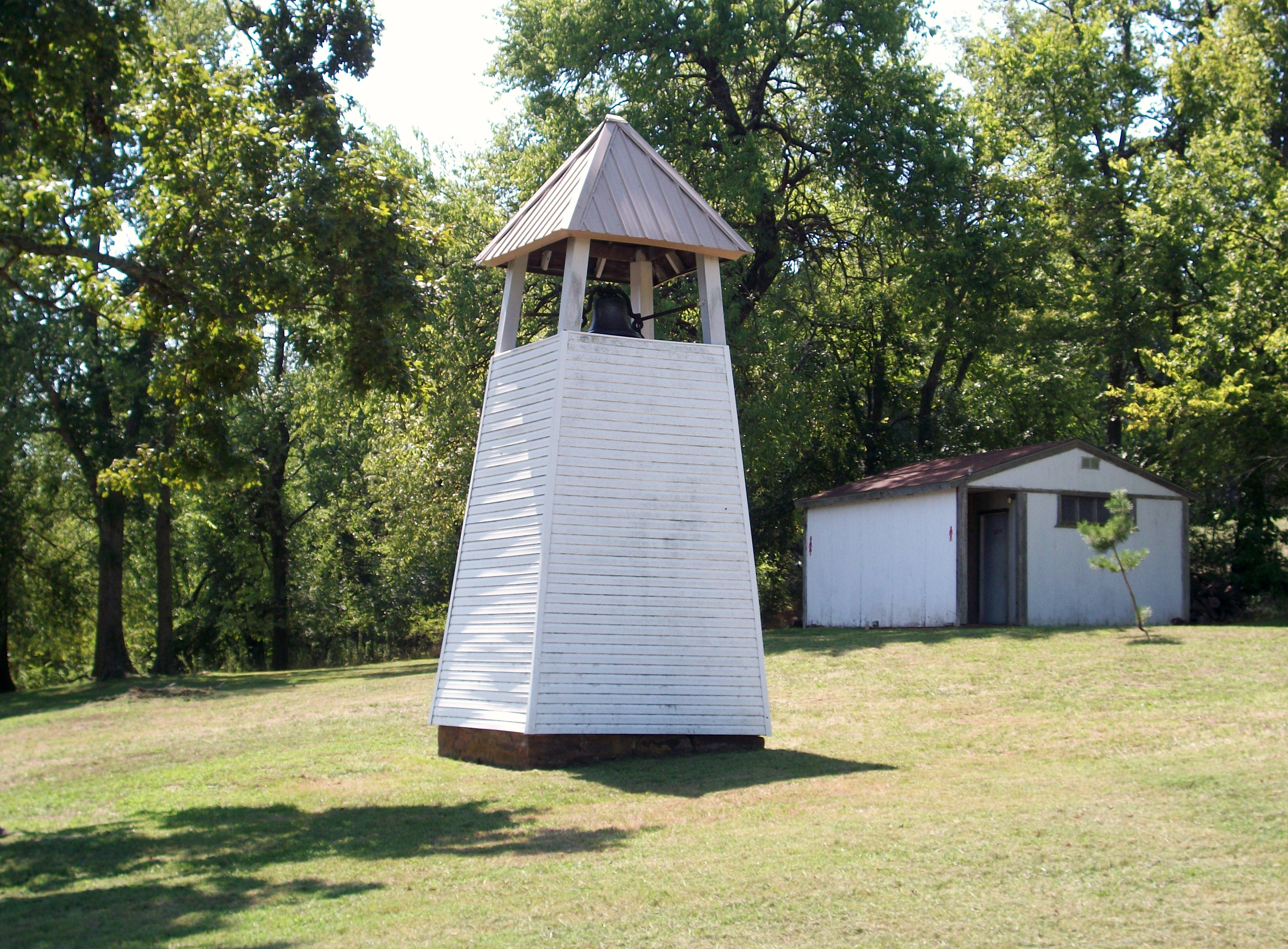
Cane Hill College's bell tower.

Canehill, Arkansas is now an unincorporated community in Northwest Arkansas. Only one building remains of Cane Hill College, the rebuilt school following the 1885 fire. After closing, the building was used by the Salem Congregation of the Cumberland Presbyterian Church for worship, then as a public school from 1919 to 1956. It is listed as "Cane Hill College Building" on the National Register of Historic Places. The Bell House is also still located on the old campus grounds. The Cumberland Presbyterians converted Cane Hill College into Arkansas Cumberland College and later University of the Ozarks, but college education never returned to Cane Hill.

== Alumni ==
- J. P. Carnahan, Confederate States of America officer, a professor of mathematics, and Populist politician
- Jordan E. Cravens, lawyer and politician who served as a U.S. representative from Arkansas
- John Sebastian Little, member of the United States House of Representatives and the 21st governor of the U.S. state of Arkansas

== See also ==
- Earle House, housed the president of Cane Hill College
- National Register of Historic Places listings in Washington County, Arkansas
