= Cane Hill Township, Washington County, Arkansas =

Township of Cane Hill
- Township
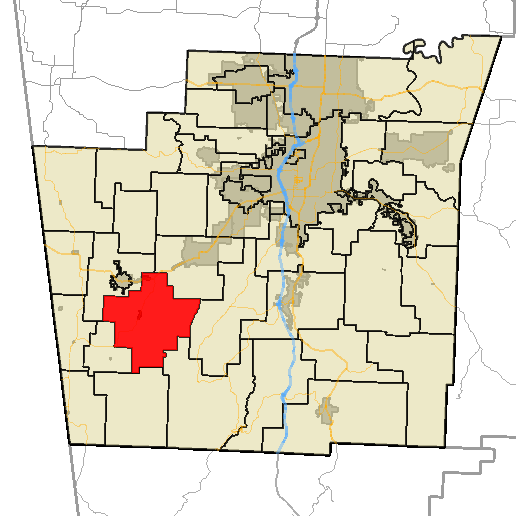
- Cane Hill Township in Washington County, Arkansas
- Coordinates: 35°54′00″N 94°24′11″W
- Country: United States
- State: Arkansas
- County: Washington
- Established: 1829

Area
  - Total: 34.56 sq mi (89.5 km^{2})
  - Land: 34.36 sq mi (89.0 km^{2})
  - Water: 0.2 sq mi (0.52 km^{2})
- Elevation: 1,680 ft (510 m)

Population (2010)
  - Total: 1,530
  - Density: 44.5/sq mi (17.2/km^{2})
- Time zone: UTC-6 (CST)
  - Summer (DST): UTC-5 (CDT)
- Area code: 479
- GNIS feature ID: 69781

Cane Hill Township is one of 37 townships in Washington County, Arkansas, USA. As of the 2010 census, its unincorporated population was 1,530.

== Geography ==
According to the United States Census Bureau, Cane Hill Township covers an area of 34.36 square miles (89.0 km^{2}) of land and 0.2 square miles (0.52 km^{2}) of water for 34.56 square miles (89.5 km^{2}) in total area.

=== Cities, towns, villages ===
- Canehill
- Clyde

=== Cemeteries ===
The township contains eight cemeteries: Canehill, Cox, Kidd, McClellan, New Hope, Reese, Russell, and Yates.

=== Major routes ===
- U.S. Route 62
- Arkansas Highway 45
