= Slaytonville, Arkansas =

- Unincorporated community
- Location within Arkansas Location within the United States
- Coordinates: 35°06′38″N 94°26′19″W
- Country: United States
- State: Arkansas
- County: Sebastian
- Elevation: 653 ft (199 m)
- Time zone: UTC-6 (Central (CST))
  - Summer (DST): UTC-5 (CDT)
- Area code: 479
- GNIS feature ID: 58634

Slaytonville is an unincorporated community in Sebastian County, Arkansas, United States.
