= Arkansas College (Fayetteville, Arkansas) =

Defunct private college in Fayetteville, Arkansas

- Type: Private liberal arts college
- Active: 1850–1862
- Founder: Elder Robert Graham
- Religious affiliation: Christian Church
- Students: ~200 (1854)
- Location: Fayetteville, Arkansas; 36.0655°N 94.1570°W

Arkansas College was a private liberal arts college in Fayetteville, Arkansas, founded by Elder Robert Graham in 1850. Affiliated with the Christian Church, it closed at the outbreak of the Civil War.

== History ==
Arkansas College was founded as a college for young men by Elder Robert Graham (1822–1901) at Fayetteville in 1850. In 1852, it was the first school to receive a charter from the state. In 1859, Rev. William Baxter became the second president of the college. It was destroyed by Ben McCulloch's rear guard on March 4, 1862, during the Confederate army's retreat from Cross Hollows, Arkansas.
