= Arkansas Highway 45 =

Highway in Arkansas

Highway 45

Route information
- Maintained by ArDOT
- Existed: 1926–present

Section 1
- Length: 26.97 mi (43.40 km)
- South end: AR 96 in Hartford
- North end: I-540 / US 71 in Fort Smith

Section 2
- Length: 10.64 mi (17.12 km)
- South end: AR 59 near Dutch Mills
- North end: US 62 near Lincoln

Section 3
- Length: 25.42 mi (40.91 km)
- South end: College Avenue in Fayetteville
- Major intersections: US 412 near Hindsville
- North end: AR 12 near Clifty

Location
- Country: United States
- State: Arkansas
- Counties: Sebastian, Washington, Madison

Highway system
- Arkansas Highway System; Interstate; US; State; Business; Spurs; Suffixed; Scenic; Heritage
← AR 44	→ AR 46

Arkansas Highway 45 (AR 45) is a designation for three state highways in Northwest Arkansas. One segment of 26.97 miles (43.40 km) runs from Highway 96 north to Interstate 540 (I-540) in Fort Smith. A second segment of 10.64 miles (17.12 km) runs from Highway 59 north of Dutch Mills north to U.S. Route 62 (US 62) east of Lincoln. A third segment of 25.42 miles (40.91 km) runs from College Avenue in Fayetteville north to Highway 12 west of Clifty. These routes were formerly connected until a portion of approximately 50 miles (80 km) was redesignated Highway 59 and many United States highways were rerouted through Fayetteville.

== Route description ==
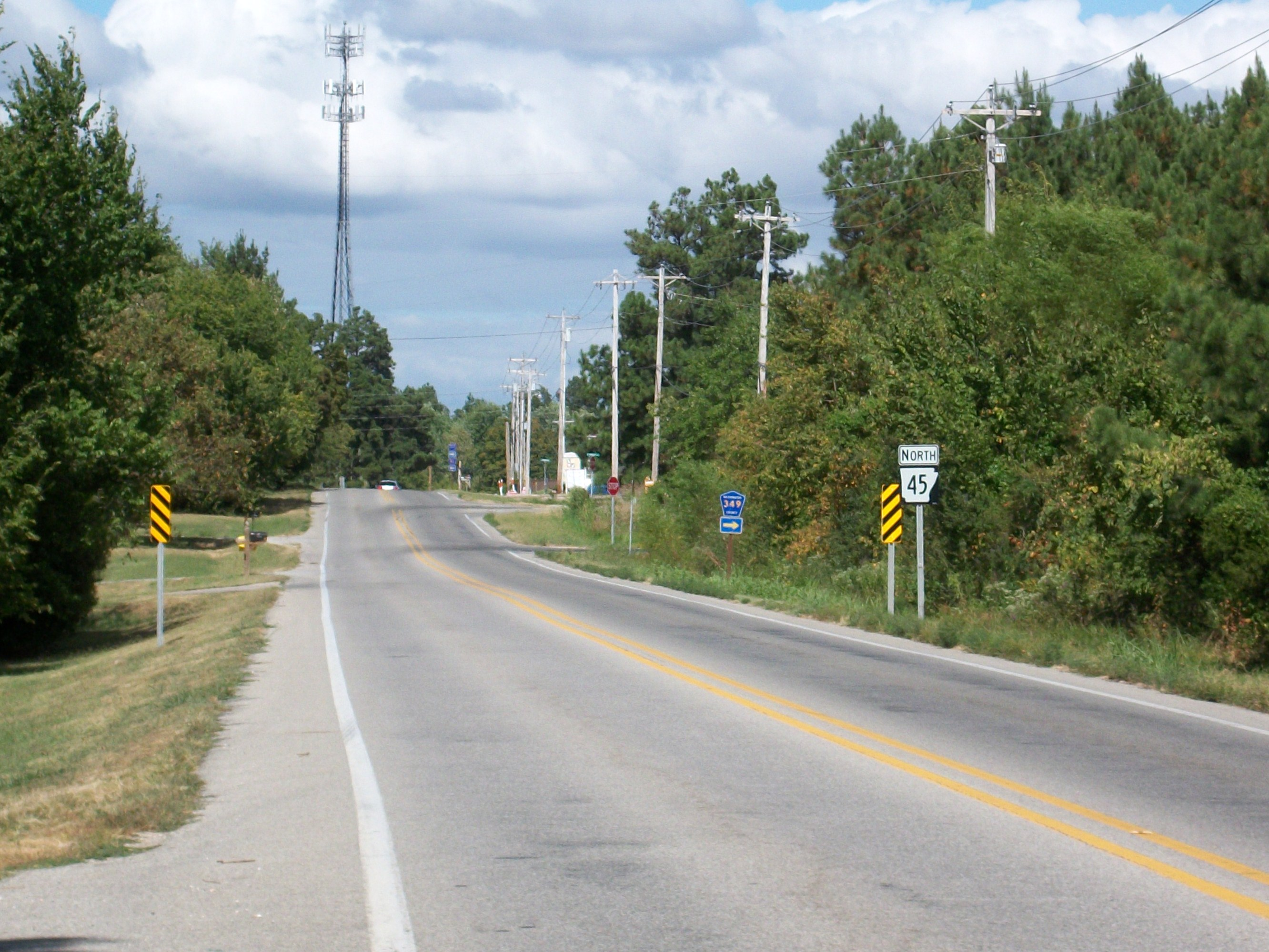
Highway 45 between Fayetteville and Goshen (facing east).

=== Hartford to Fort Smith ===
Highway 45 begins at Highway 96 in Hartford and runs north to meet Highway 252 on either side of Midland. Further north, the route has a 0.45 miles (0.72 km) concurrency with Highway 10 through downtown Hackett. Slightly north of Highway 10, Highway 45 runs on the Hackett Creek Bridge and continues north to Bonanza. The route intersects Highway 253 and curves east to form a concurrency with US 71. The highway splits from US 71 to the north, entering Fort Smith, and intersects Highway 255 before terminating at I-540/US 71.

=== Dutch Mills to Lincoln ===
The route begins at Highway 59 north of Dutch Mills and runs east past the Bethlehem Cemetery and Twin Bridges Historic District, both on the National Register of Historic Places. The route continues northeast through Clyde before passing the Pyeatte Mill Site and entering the historic community of Canehill. Continuing north, the highway meets US 62 east of Lincoln, where it terminates.

=== Fayetteville to Clifty ===
The route begins at College Avenue and runs west as Lafayette Street through Fayetteville. Highway 45 runs through the Washington-Willow Historic District before a sharp left turn onto Mission Boulevard. The highway continues northeast until intersecting Highway 265 and exiting Fayetteville heading east. Passing the Son's Chapel and entering Goshen, the highway continues east through rural Washington County until entering Madison County shortly after a junction with Highway 303. Highway 45 has a junction with Highway 295 before forming a concurrency with US 412B north through Hindsville. The route continues north, with US 412B terminating at a junction with US 412 and Highway 45 terminating at Highway 12 west of Clifty.

== History ==
Highway 45 was one of the original 1926 state highways. The route ran north from Oklahoma west of Hartford, Arkansas to Clifty. The middle segment was replaced by Highway 59 between Van Buren and Dutch Mills, and the route remains fragmented today.

== Major intersections ==
County	Location	mi	km	Destinations	Notes
Sebastian	Hartford	0.00	0.00	AR 96 – Mansfield, Hartford, Monroe, OK	Southern terminus
Sebastian		4.00	6.44	AR 252 east – Huntington	Western terminus of AR 252
Sebastian	Midland	5.51	8.87	AR 253 north (Third Street) – Excelsior	Southern terminus of AR 253
Sebastian		6.82	10.98	AR 252 west – Slaytonville	Eastern terminus of AR 252
Sebastian	Hackett	13.81	22.23	AR 10 west	Southern end of AR 10 concurrency
Sebastian	Hackett	14.26	22.95	AR 10 east – Greenwood	Northern end of AR 10 concurrency
Sebastian	Enterprise	19.71	31.72	AR 253 north	Southern terminus of AR 253
Sebastian	Fort Smith	23.07	37.13	US 71 south – Greenwood	Southern end of US 71 concurrency
Sebastian	Fort Smith	0.00	0.00	US 71 north – Fort Smith	Northern end of US 71 concurrency
Sebastian	Fort Smith	3.02	4.86	AR 255 (Zero Street) to I-540 (US 71) – Downtown Fort Smith, Barling	
Sebastian	Fort Smith	3.90	6.28	I-540 (US 71) to I-40 – Spiro, OK, Van Buren	Northern terminus; exit 10 on I-540
Gap in route
Washington		0.00	0.00	AR 59 to US 62 – Van Buren	Southern terminus
Washington		10.64	17.12	US 62 – Lincoln, Prairie Grove	
Washington	Gap in route				
Washington	Fayetteville	0.00	0.00	College Avenue	Former US 71B
Washington	Fayetteville			Assembly Road – Mount Sequoyah Assembly	Former AR 180
Washington	Fayetteville	2.88	4.63	AR 265 (Crossover Road) to AR 16 – Springdale	
Washington	Mayfield	14.41	23.19	AR 303 north – Spring Valley	Southern terminus of AR 303
Madison		16.83	27.09	AR 295	
Madison		19.32	31.09	US 412B east to US 412 east – Huntsville	Southern end of US 412B concurrency
Madison		0.00	0.00	US 412 – Springdale, Huntsville US 412B ends	Northern terminus of US 412B
Madison		6.10	9.82	AR 12 – Rogers, Clifty, Eureka Springs	Northern terminus
1.000 mi = 1.609 km; 1.000 km = 0.621 mi: Concurrency terminus

== See also ==
- List of state highways in Arkansas
