= Spring Valley, Washington County, Arkansas =

Spring Valley, Arkansas
- Unincorporated community
- Spring Valley's position in Arkansas. Spring Valley, Arkansas (the United States)
- Coordinates: 36°10′34″N 93°56′06″W
- Country: United States
- State: Arkansas
- County: Washington
- Township: Brush Creek
- Elevation: 1,306 ft (398 m)
- Time zone: UTC-6 (Central (CST))
  - Summer (DST): UTC-5 (CDT)
- Area code: 479
- GNIS feature ID: 78435

Spring Valley (also Springvalley) is an unincorporated community in Brush Creek Township, Washington County, Arkansas, United States.
