= Canehill, Arkansas =

Unincorporated community in Arkansas

- Census-designated place
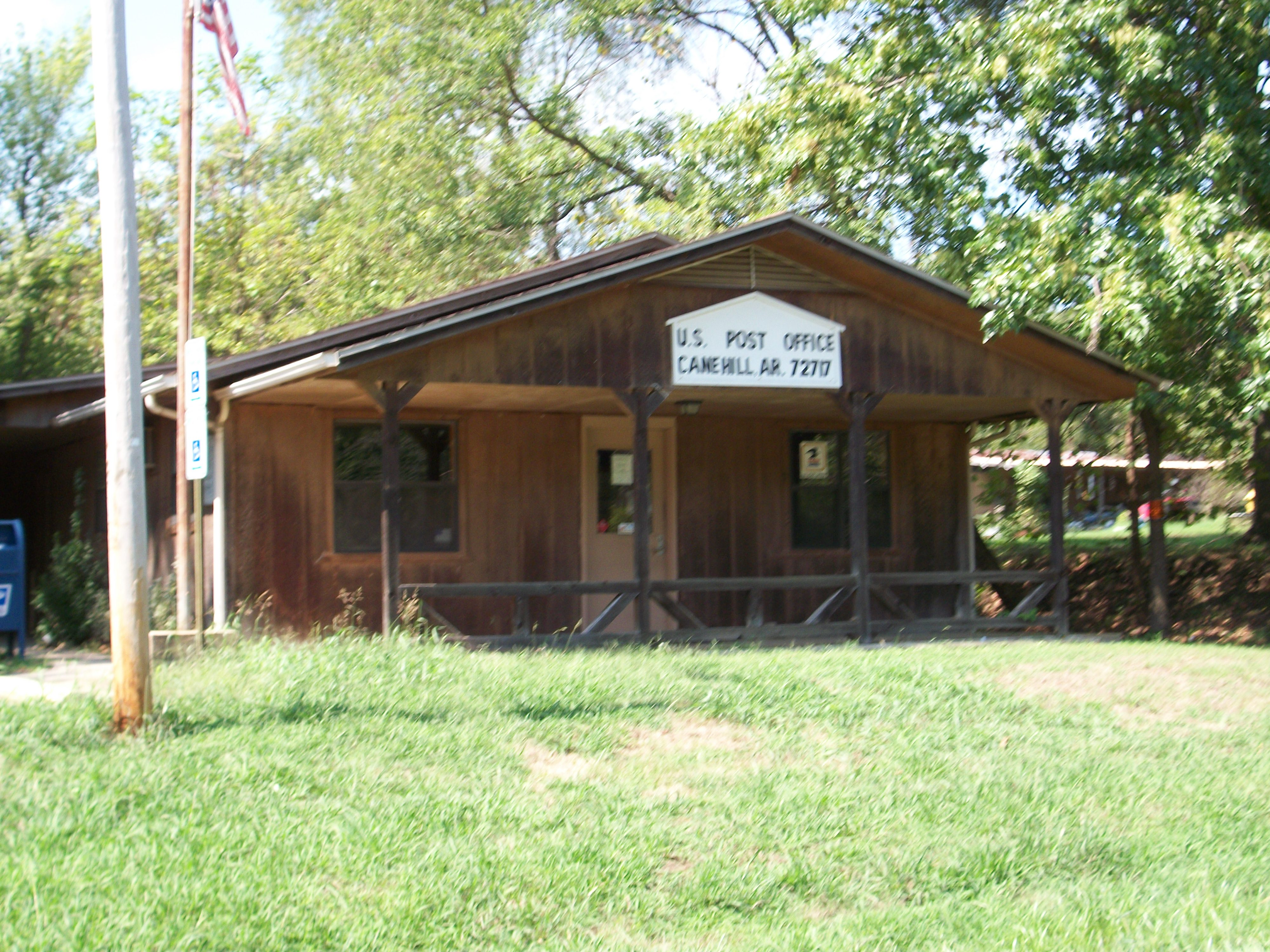
- The Canehill Post Office

- Location in Arkansas Canehill (the United States)
- Coordinates: 35°54′31″N 94°23′48″W
- Country: United States
- State: Arkansas
- County: Washington
- Township: Cane Hill
- Founded: 1839 (187 years ago)
- Elevation: 1,388 ft (423 m)

Population (2020)
  - Total: 74
- Time zone: UTC−6 (Central (CST))
  - Summer (DST): UTC−5 (CDT)
- ZIP Code: 72717
- Area code: 479
- GNIS feature ID: 2805630
- Website: historiccanehillar.org

Canehill, also known as Cane Hill and Boonsboro, is an unincorporated community and census-designated place (CDP) in Washington County, Arkansas, United States. It was first listed as a CDP in the 2020 census with a population of 74.

The community is located in the Ozark Mountains on the outskirts of the Northwest Arkansas metropolitan area. One of the most historic communities in the state, Canehill contains seventeen listings on the National Register of Historic Places (NRHP). The Cane Hill College began operations in 1834, which led to the rapid growth and development of the community as a center of higher education. The college and community suffered during the American Civil War, and was bypassed by the railroad, which chose a route through Lincoln. Recently, restoration and preservation of many historic buildings has been undertaken by a nonprofit organization, Historic Cane Hill Inc.

== Geography ==
The post office at Canehill is 1322 feet above sea level. Canehill is on Arkansas Highway 45, approximately 25 miles (40 km) southwest of Fayetteville and 6 miles (9.7 km) east of the Oklahoma border. Considered a postal designation (ZIP code 72717), the population of the ZCTA was 847 at the 2000 census.

== History ==
In 1834, the Cumberland Presbyterians established the first collegiate learning institute in Arkansas, naming it the Cane Hill School, after a nearby geological feature. The current Post Office was opened in 1839 and was originally unnamed. In 1843, it was named Boonsboro, and the town maintained this name throughout the American Civil War. The year of 1862 brought the Battle of Cane Hill.

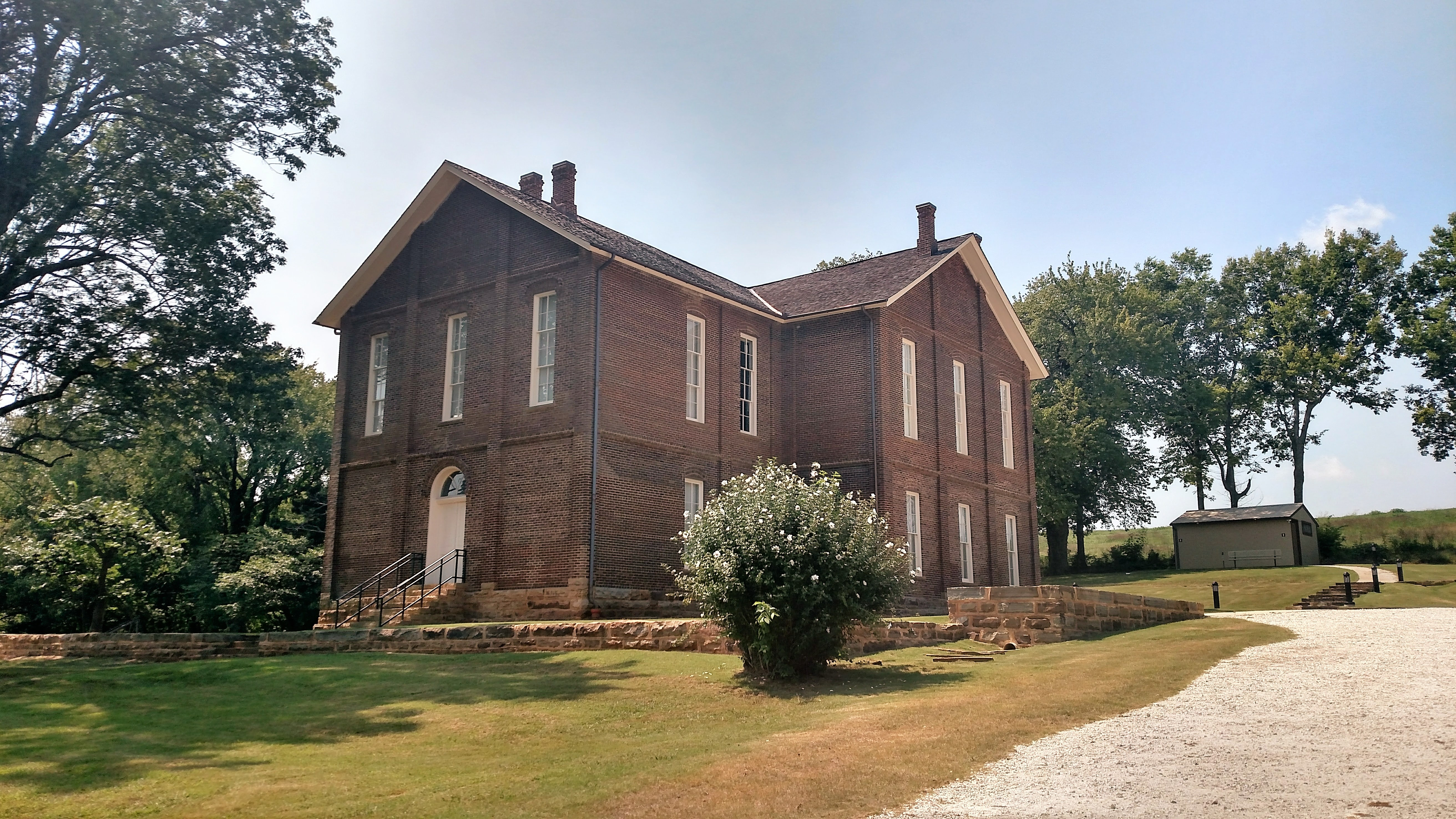
Old Cane Hill College in September 2017

In 1897, the Cumberland Presbyterian Church considered Cane Hill College as the starting point for their "state" college. However, due to the nearby competition from Arkansas Industrial University, the decline of Cane Hill as a population center and its remote location, the Synod decided to open Arkansas Cumberland College in Clarksville, Arkansas, a more centralized location. In 1891, Cane Hill College closed its doors permanently. In 1901, the community's name was changed to the current usage, that of Canehill.

== Economy ==
Early settlers were attracted to the area by natural springs, which were used in agricultural operations. The community served as a trading post and regional center for apple orchards to sell crops to merchants from Fort Smith. The locals also produced and sold sorghum, a tradition continuing today at the annual harvest festival.

== Education ==
The community is served by the Lincoln Consolidated School District. Lincoln High School is its sole high school.

== Demographics ==
Historical population
Census	Pop.	Note	%±
2020	74		—
U.S. Decennial Census; 2020

=== 2020 census ===
Canehill CDP, Arkansas – Racial and ethnic composition Note: the US Census treats Hispanic/Latino as an ethnic category. This table excludes Latinos from the racial categories and assigns them to a separate category. Hispanics/Latinos may be of any race.
Race / Ethnicity (NH = Non-Hispanic)	Pop 2020	% 2020
White alone (NH)	50	67.57%
Black or African American alone (NH)	0	0.00%
Native American or Alaska Native alone (NH)	1	1.35%
Asian alone (NH)	0	0.00%
Pacific Islander alone (NH)	1	1.35%
Some Other Race alone (NH)	3	4.05%
Mixed Race or Multi-Racial (NH)	15	20.27%
Hispanic or Latino (any race)	4	5.41%
Total	74	100.00%

== Transportation ==
As of 2023, there is no fixed route transit service in Canehill. Ozark Regional Transit operates demand-response service in the area. The nearest intercity bus service is provided by Jefferson Lines in Fayetteville.

== Gallery ==
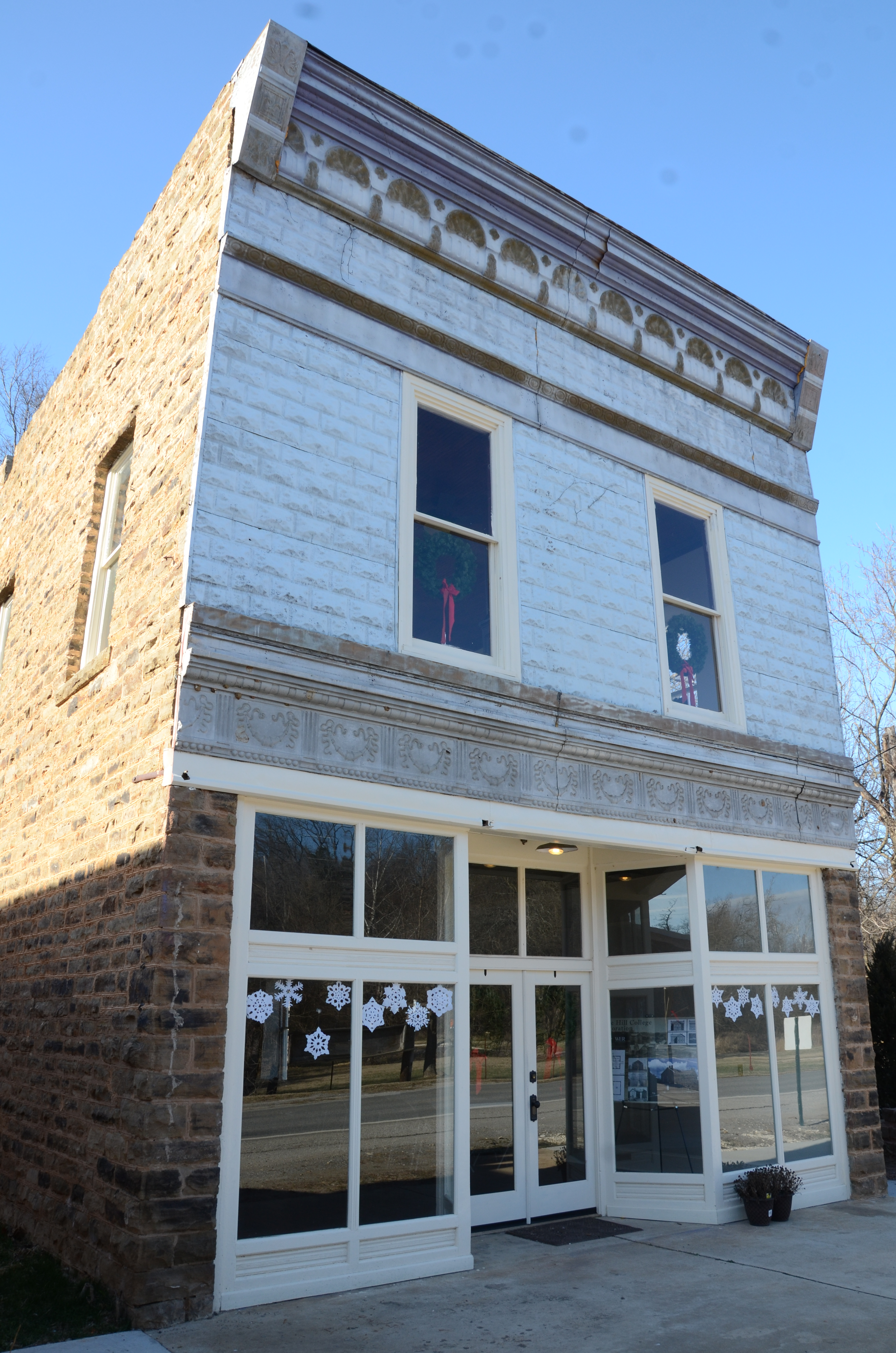
A.R. Carroll Building

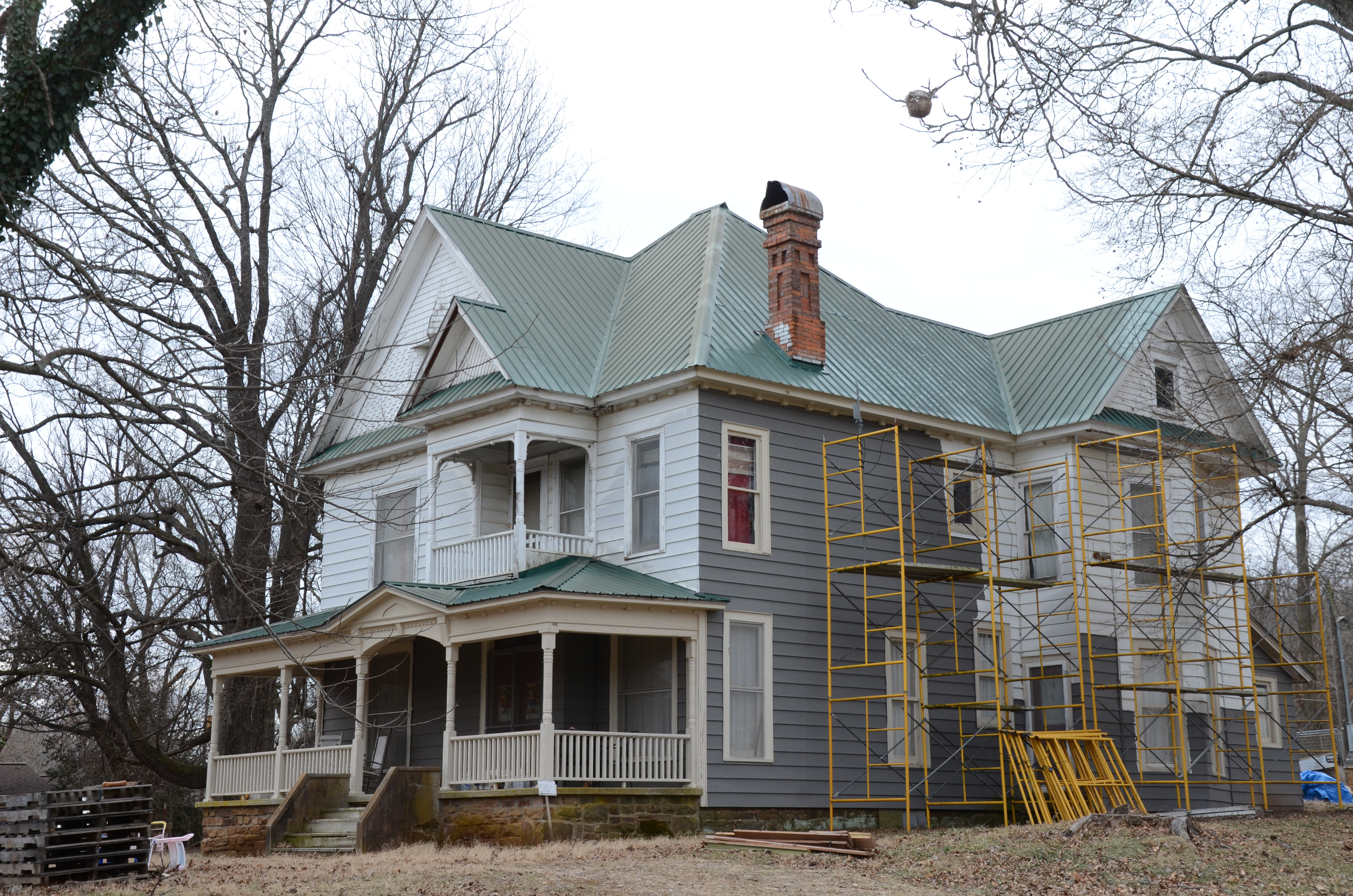
Blackburn House

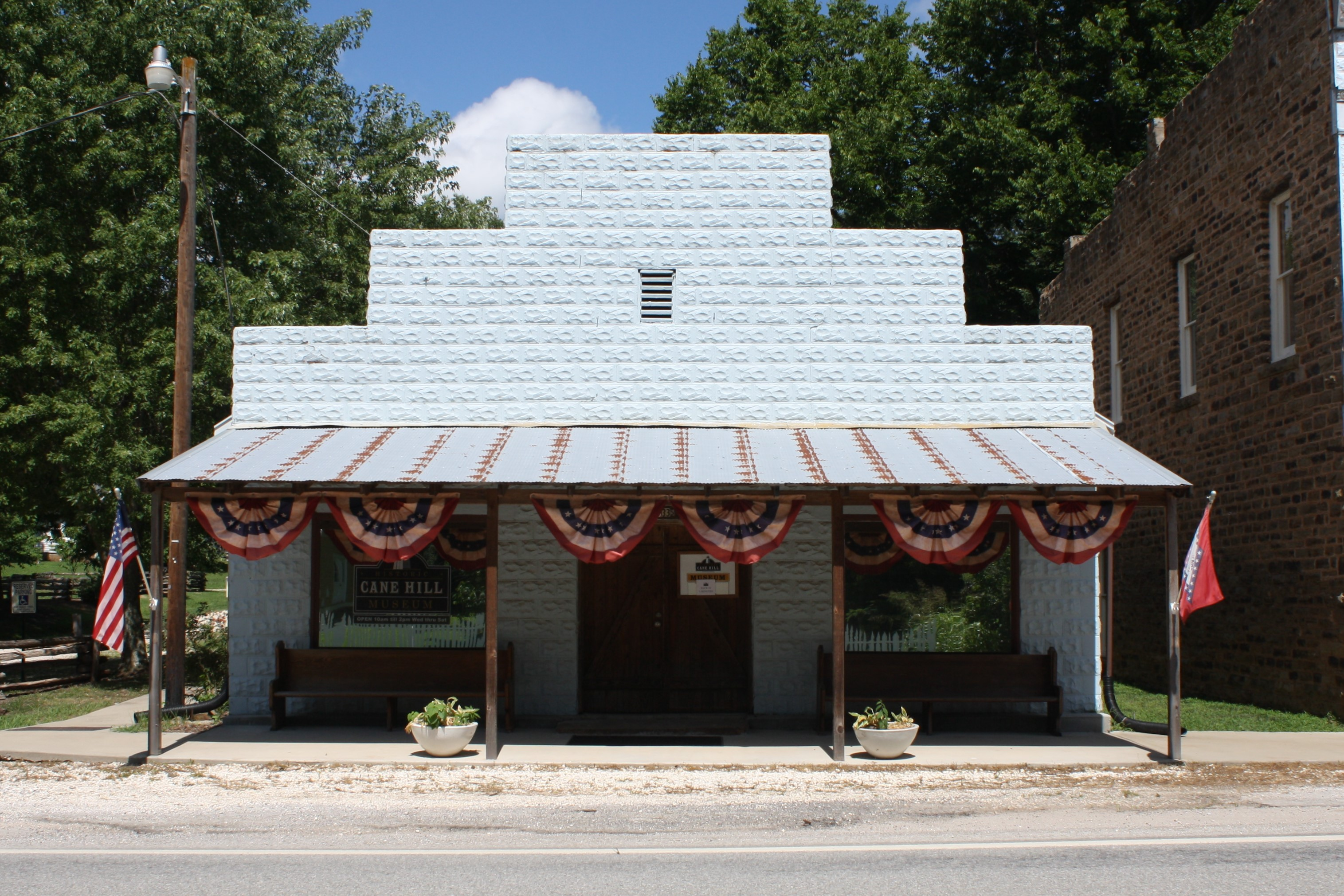
Cane Hill Museum

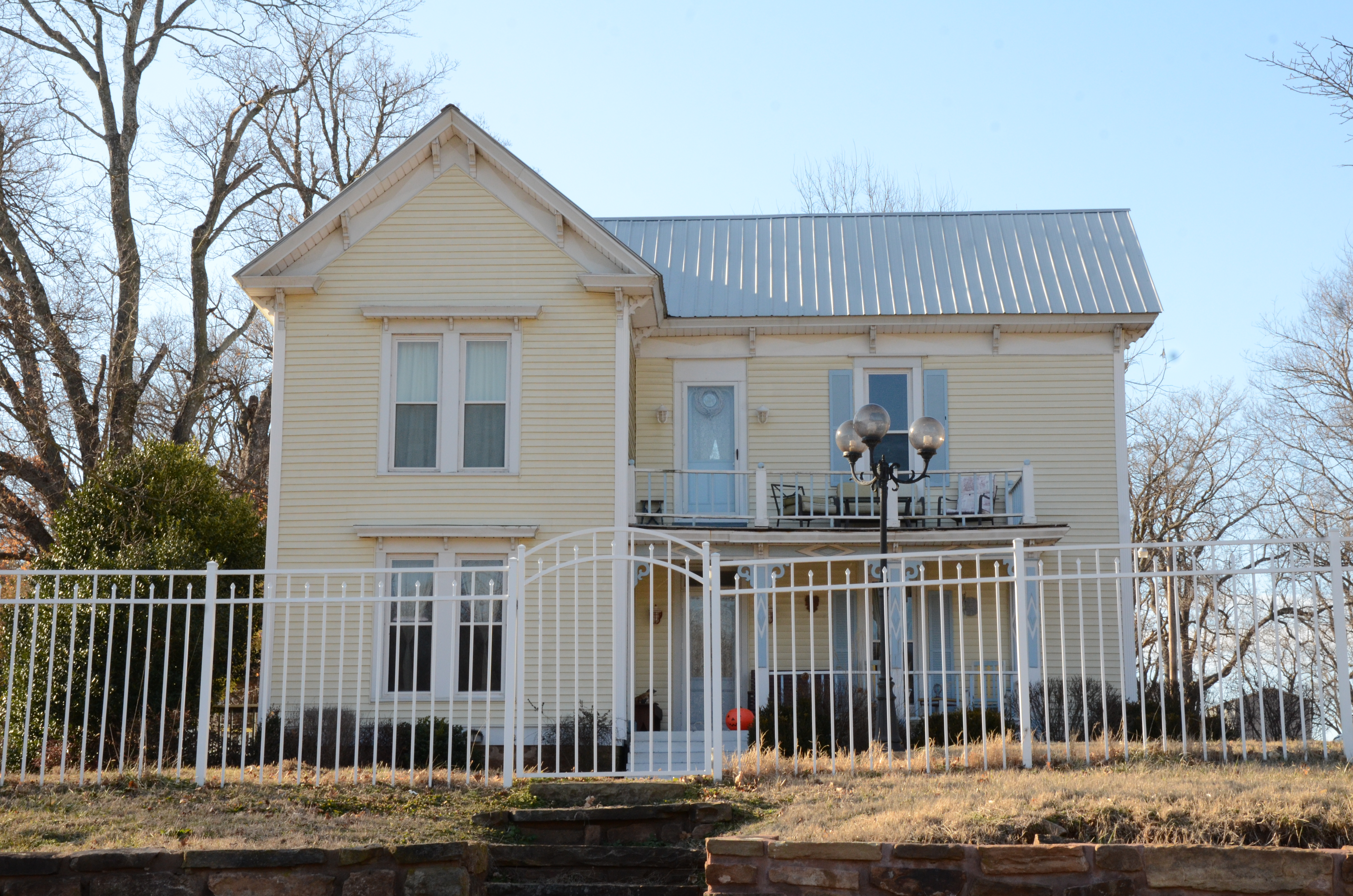
D.N. Edmiston House

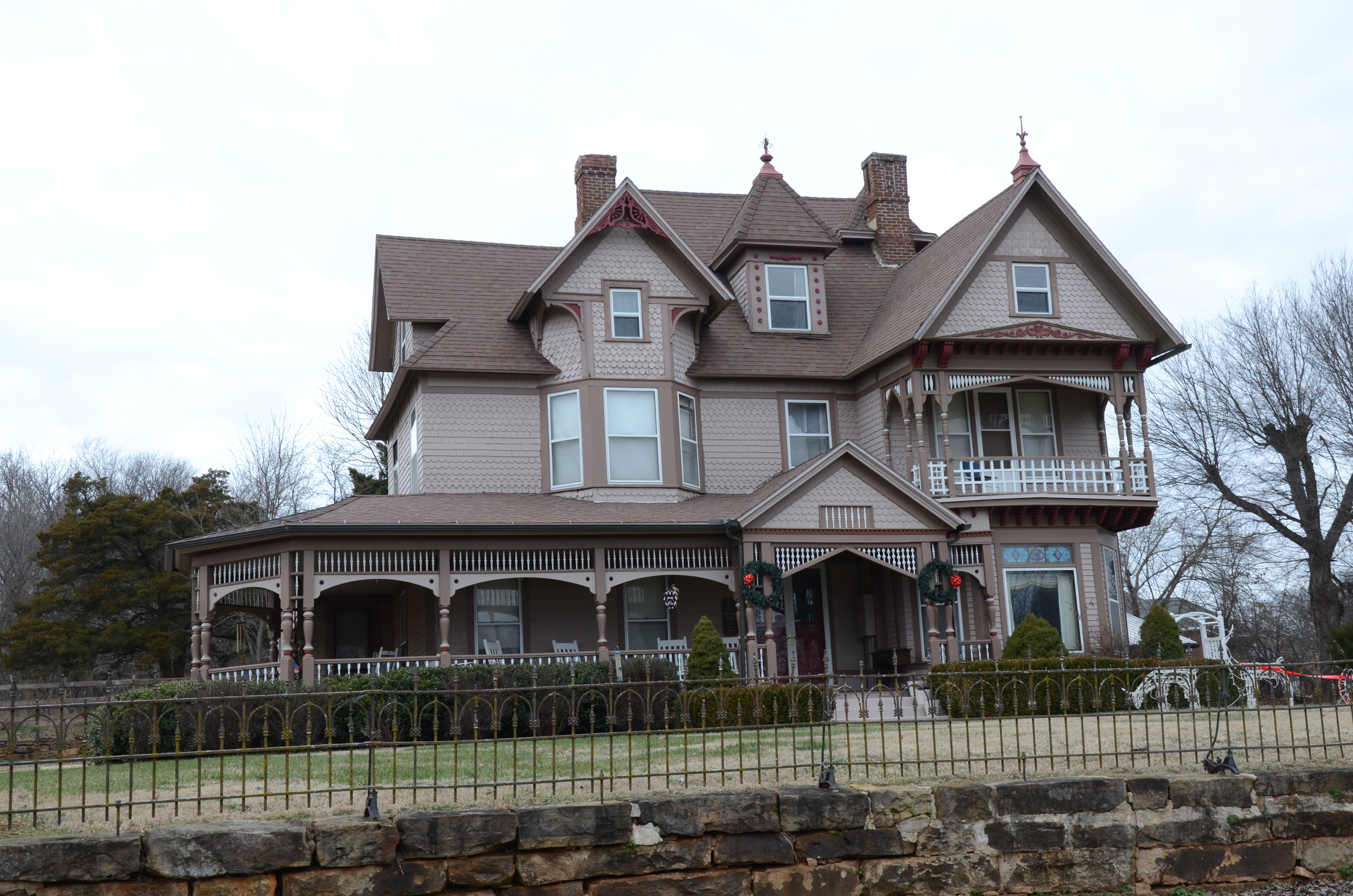
John Edmiston House

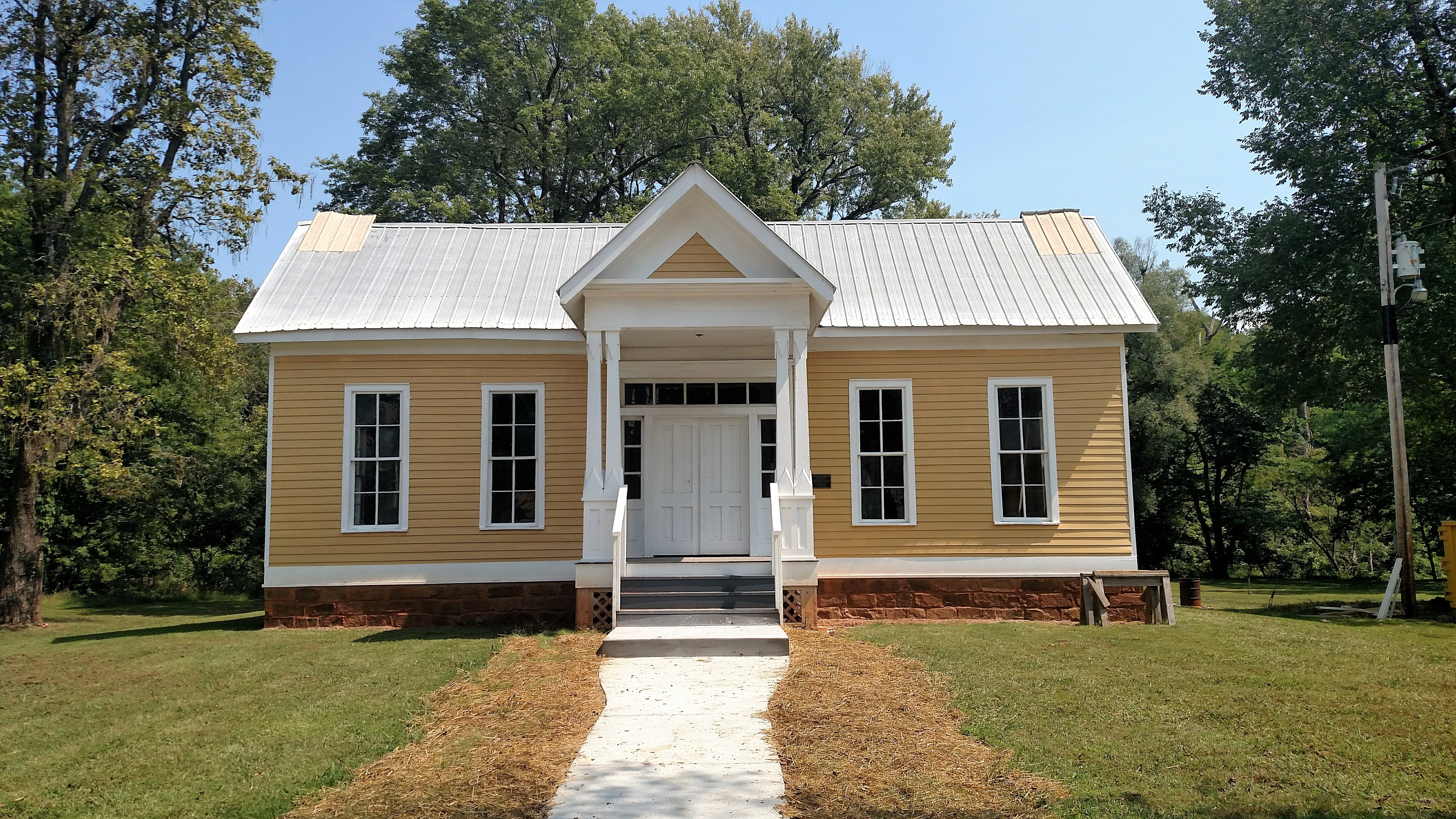
Zeb Edmiston House

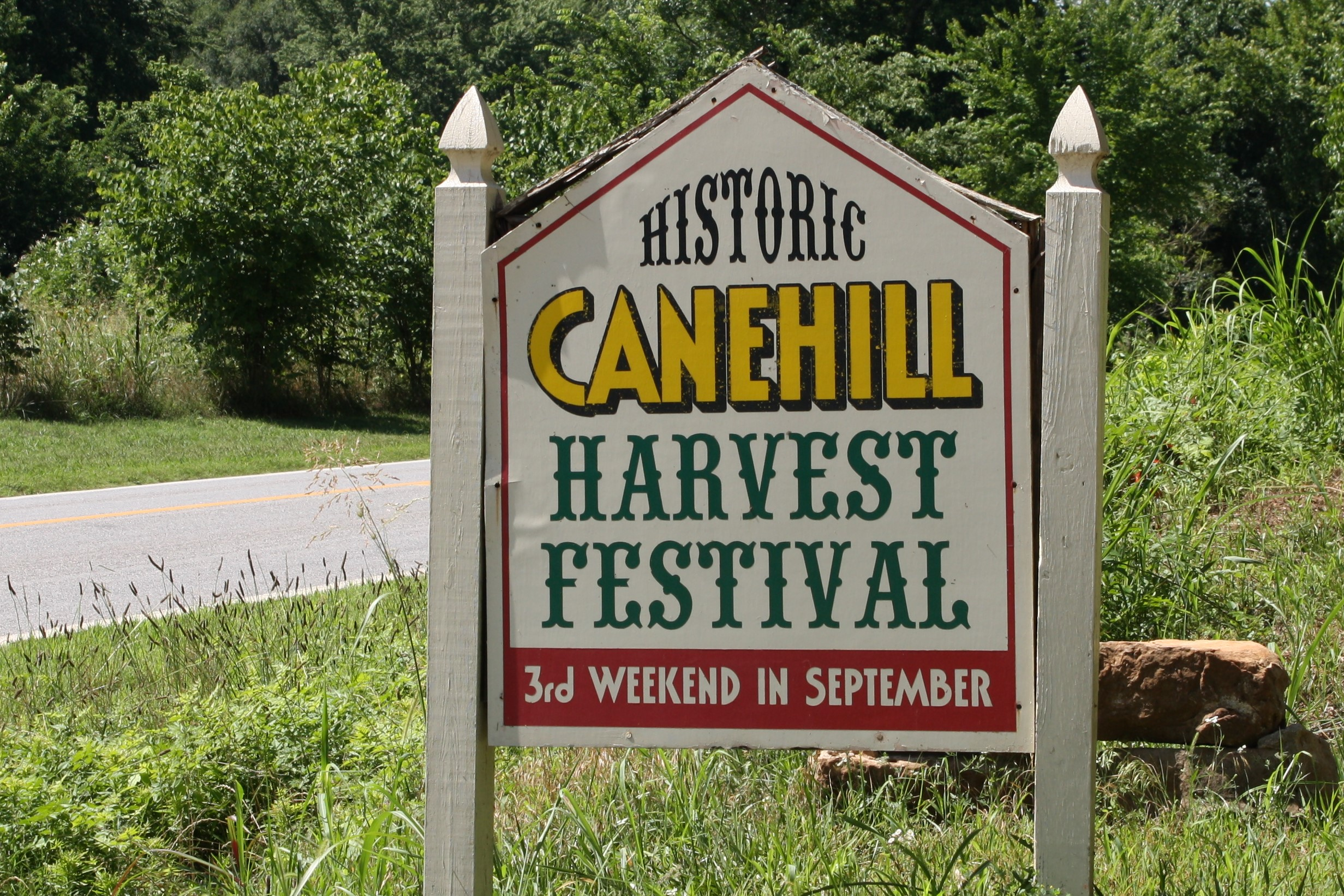
Harvest Festival Sign

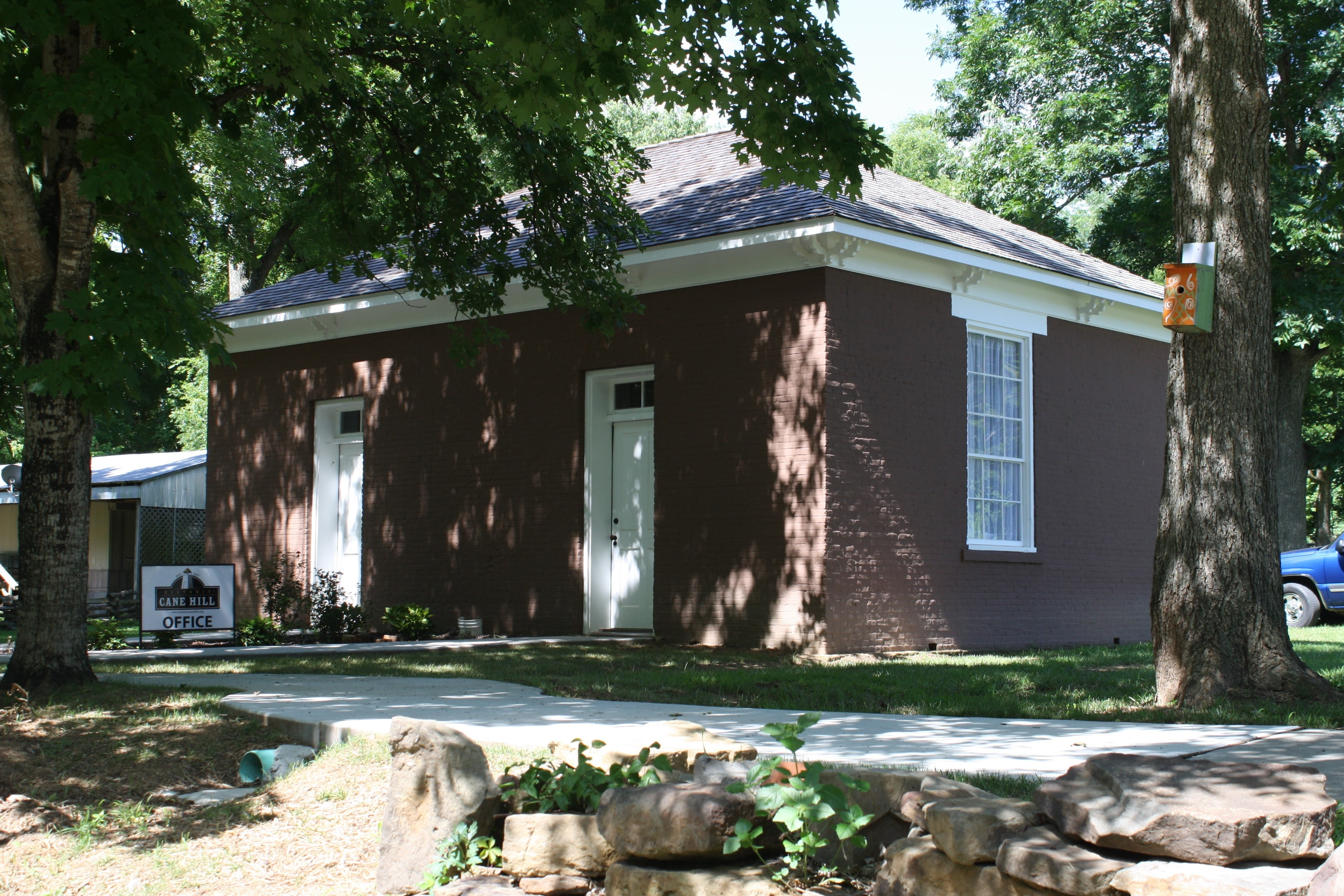
Methodist Manse

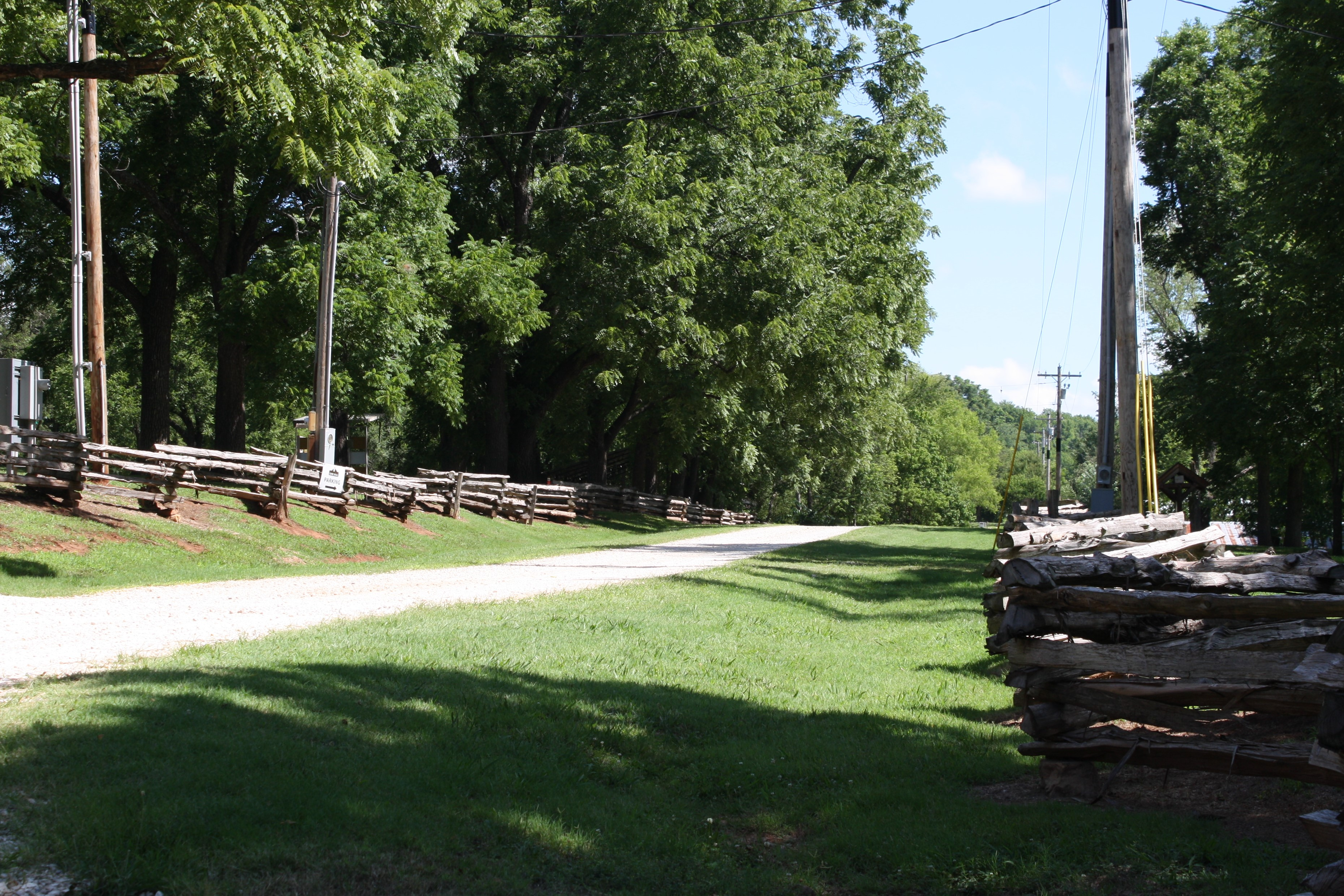
Streetside in Cane Hill
