= Arkansas Highway 156 =

State highway in Arkansas, United States

Highway 156
- Current segments in red, former segments in blue

Route information
- Maintained by ArDOT
- Existed: 1938–present

Section 1
- Length: 0.307 mi (494 m)
- West end: SH-100 at the Oklahoma state line near Evansville
- East end: AR 59 near Evansville

Section 2
- Length: 4.208 mi (6.772 km)
- West end: AR 265 at Hogeye
- East end: I-49 / AR 170 in West Fork

Section 3
- Length: 2.892 mi (4.654 km)
- West end: US 71 in Fayetteville
- East end: Pump Station Road in Fayetteville

Location
- Country: United States
- State: Arkansas

Highway system
- Arkansas Highway System; Interstate; US; State; Business; Spurs; Suffixed; Scenic; Heritage
← AR 155	→ AR 157

Highway 156 (AR 156, Ark. 156, and Hwy. 156) is a designation for three east–west state highways in Washington County, Arkansas. The first segment was created in 1937, with two more created in 1973. All are minor state highways established to provide system connectivity and are maintained by the Arkansas Department of Transportation (ArDOT).

Former segments of Highway 156 in eastern Washington County and Prairie Grove were deleted in 1981 and 2007, respectively.

== Route description ==
ArDOT maintains all three segments of AR 156 as part of the state highway system. ArDOT estimates the traffic level for a segment of roadway was highest near Pump Station Road, estimated at 2,500 vehicles per day in 2019, on average. Other segments were estimated as 1000 VPD near Hogeye and 740 VPD north of Evansville. For reference, roads under 400 VPD are classified as "very low volume local road" by the American Association of State Highway and Transportation Officials (AASHTO).

No segment of AR 156 is part of the National Highway System (NHS), a network of roads important to the nation's economy, defense, and mobility.

=== Oklahoma to Evansville ===
Highway 156 begins at Oklahoma State Highway 100 (SH-100) at the Oklahoma state line 3 miles (4.8 km) north of the Crawford County line in Washington County. The highway runs east to Highway 59 north of the small unincorporated community of Evansville, where it terminates.

=== Hogeye to West Fork ===
Highway 156 begins at Highway 265 (a segment of the Butterfield Overland Mail Heritage Trail) at Hogeye in southern Washington County. The highway runs east along Hogeye Creek to Highway 170, where the route terminates. Continuing on Highway 170 east gives access to Interstate 49 (I-49) and the Boston Mountains Scenic Loop.

=== Fayetteville ===
The highway begins at US Highway 71 (US 71, School Avenue) north of Drake Field in southern Fayetteville. Highway 156 runs east as Willoughby Road near the Fayetteville Country Club before turning north and becoming City Lake Road. The highway continues north before a junction with Pump Station Road, where state maintenance ends. From the eastern terminus, the road continues due north under local maintenance to Highway 16.

== History ==
Highway 156 was first shown on a state highway map published January 1, 1939 between Highway 59 and Oklahoma. This segment has not changed alignment since creation.

In 1973, the Arkansas General Assembly passed Act 9 of 1973. The act directed county judges and legislators to designate up to 12 miles (19 km) of county roads as state highways in each county. Two new segments of Highway 156 were created in Washington County in accordance with the act by the Arkansas State Highway Commission on June 28, 1973. Neither has changed alignment since designation.

== Major intersections ==
The entire route is in Washington County.

Location	mi	km	Destinations	Notes
	0.000	0.000	SH-100 west	Western terminus
Evansville	0.307	0.494	AR 59 – Evansville	Eastern terminus
Gap in route
Hogeye	0.000	0.000	AR 265 (Butterfield Overland Mail Trail)	Western terminus
West Fork	4.208	6.772	I-49 / AR 170 – West Fork, Devil's Den State Park	Eastern terminus; exit 53 on I-49
Gap in route
Fayetteville	0.00	0.00	US 71 (School Avenue)	Western terminus
Fayetteville	2.892	4.654	End state maintenance at Pump Station Road	Eastern terminus
1.000 mi = 1.609 km; 1.000 km = 0.621 mi

== See also ==
- Arkansas Highway 156 (1973–1981) former alignment in Washington County
- Arkansas Highway 156 (1980–2007) former alignment in Prairie Grove
