= Butterfield Overland Mail Route Fayetteville Segments Historic District =

Historic district in Arkansas, United States

- U.S. National Register of Historic Places
- U.S. Historic district
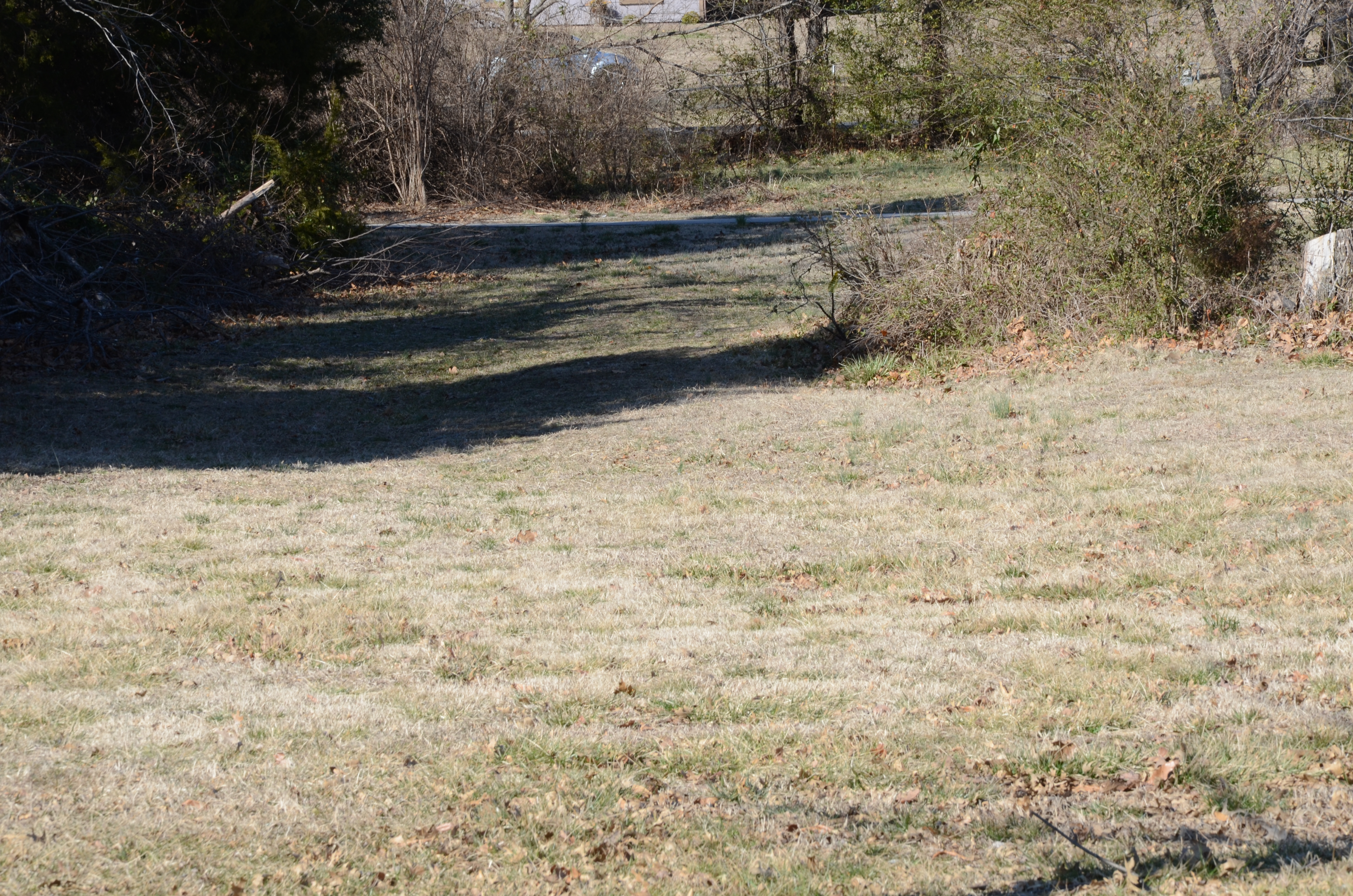

- Location within Arkansas Location within the United States
- Location: West of AR 265 in Lake Fayetteville Park, Fayetteville, Arkansas
- Area: 2.5 acres (1.0 ha)
- NRHP reference No.: 09000456
- Added to NRHP: June 18, 2009

The Butterfield Overland Mail Route Fayetteville Segments Historic District is an area of 2.5 acres (1.0 ha) in Lake Fayetteville Park in Fayetteville, Arkansas which preserves an original routing of the Butterfield Overland Mail route through Northwest Arkansas. The trail and surrounding area became listed on the National Register of Historic Places (NRHP) in 2009 and is being explored as an addition to the National Historic Trails System upon signing of the Omnibus Public Lands Management Act of 2009.

== History ==
The Butterfield Overland Mail route was a stagecoach route chosen to be snow-free unlike the more northern but shorter routes in place at the time. It ran from St. Louis, Missouri to San Francisco, California beginning in 1858. Fayetteville was located between the major stops at Tipton, Missouri and Fort Smith, Arkansas and the city grew significantly during the trail's operation. This segment overlapped a formerly well-traveled Native American removal route from Springfield, Missouri to Fayetteville from the 1830s. John Butterfield built a hotel and several barns in Fayetteville for his travelers to utilize before continuing north to Fitzgerald Station in Shiloh, Mudtown, Cross Hollows, Callahan's tavern and Missouri.

== Preservation ==
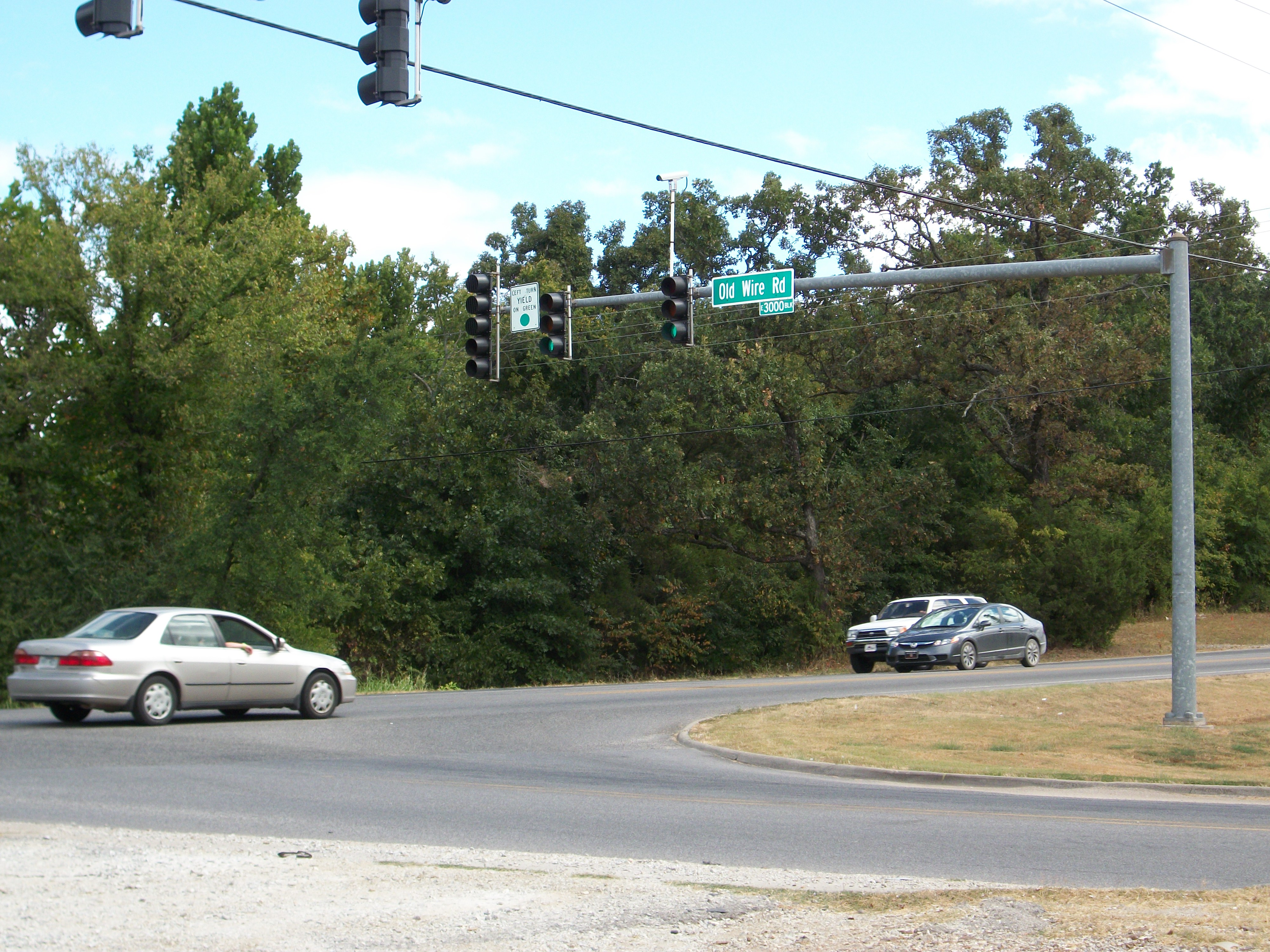
The 3000 block of Old Wire Road (Arkansas Highway 265) in Fayetteville, Arkansas.

Today, the route has been partially preserved as Arkansas Highway 265 in Northwest Arkansas and (partially) as Old Wire Road in Fayetteville. The route is designated with historic markers through Fayetteville, including an original stone along present-day College Avenue (U.S. Route 71B) in front of the Former Washington County Courthouse. This NRPH segment is not designated AR 265 and runs through Lake Fayetteville Park as a dirt path.

In south Washington County, Arkansas another NRHP-listed segment exists along Bugscuffle Road.

A study to include the Butterfield Trail as a National Historic Trail was commissioned in the Omnibus Public Lands Management Act of 2009 upon the request of Representative John Bozeman as a nationally significant piece of history of trade and commerce in America.

== See also ==
- Butterfield Overland Mail Route Segment near Strickler, Arkansas
- Butterfield Overland Mail Route Lucian Wood Road Segment near Cedarville, Arkansas
- Butterfield Overland Mail Route Lee Creek Road Segment near Cedarville, Arkansas
- National Register of Historic Places listings in Washington County, Arkansas
