= Fitzgerald Station and Farmstead =

Historic house in Arkansas, United States

- U.S. National Register of Historic Places
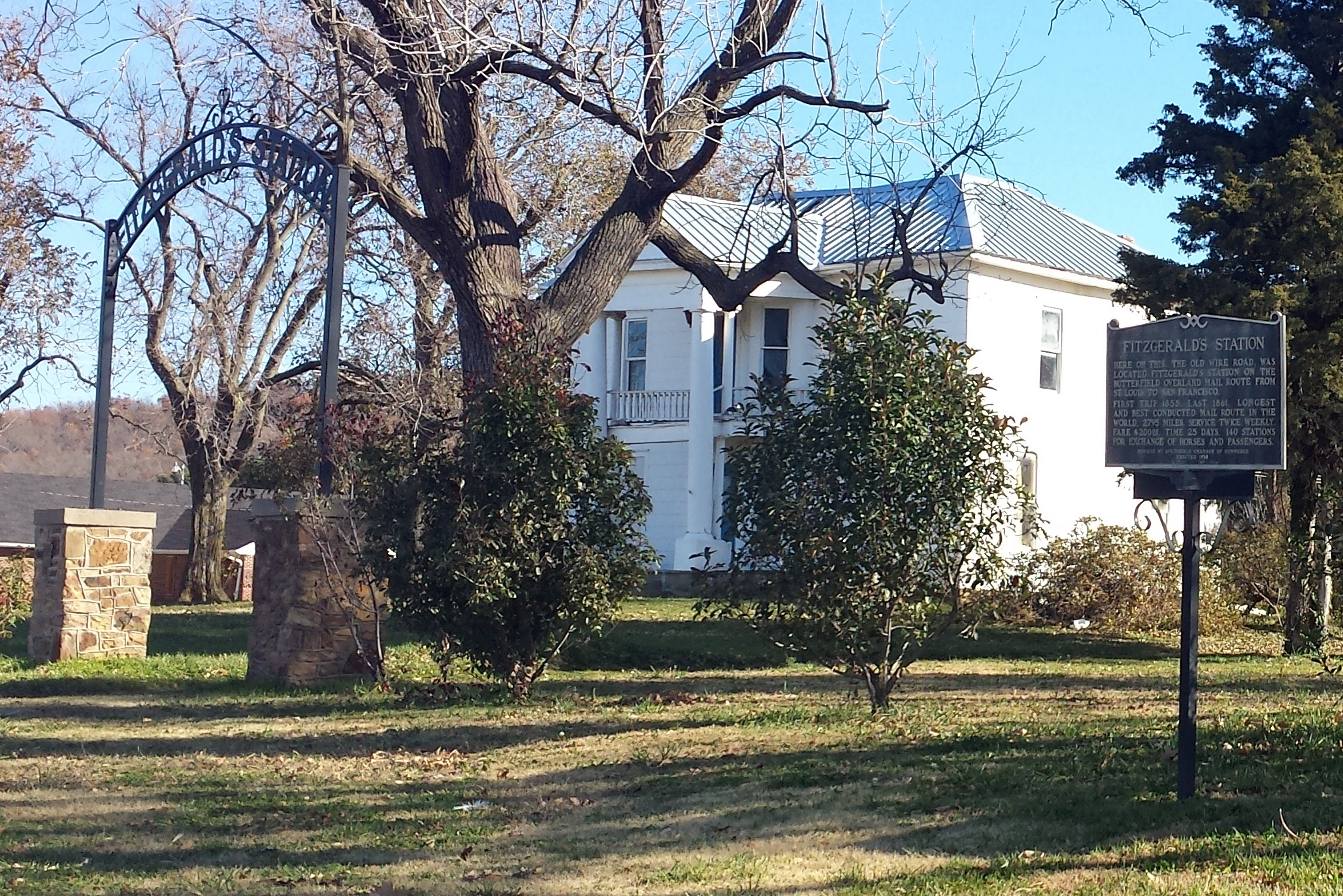

- Location within Arkansas Location within the United States
- Location: 2327 Old Wire Road (AR 265), Springdale, Arkansas
- Coordinates: 36°12′19″N 94°6′49″W
- Area: 4.2 acres (1.7 ha)
- Built: 1857
- Architectural style: Greek Revival
- NRHP reference No.: 03000465
- Added to NRHP: May 29, 2003

Fitzgerald Station and Farmstead is a collection of historic buildings and structures in Springdale, Arkansas associated with the Butterfield Overland Mail Trail. Historically the site of a tavern popular with travelers heading west prior to the establishment of the Butterfield Trail, the property became a station along the route in the 1850s. Today, the property retains an original 1850s barn built as a waypoint along the route, as well as an 1870s house and associated outbuildings. It was listed on the National Register of Historic Places in May 2003.

== Eponym and early history ==
John Fitzgerald Sr. and his wife, Mary, relocated to Washington County, Arkansas from Alabama circa 1830. In 1834, the Fitzgerald's son, James, was the only property owner listed in a government survey of the area. As part of the land received according to the Dancing Rabbit Creek Treaty of 1830, the property of the station and farmstead was officially signed to Fitzgerald in September 1846 by President James K. Polk. An inn and tavern were established and maintained on the site, and it became popular along the route.

The site witnessed 8,000 Cherokee travelling along the Northern Route during 1838-39 as part of the Trail of Tears. Fitzgerald was mentioned in the journals of both B.B. Cannon and Dr. William Isaac Irvins Morrow, two members of a military escort taking a small group of Cherokee who were willingly relocating per the Treaty of New Echota.

== Butterfield Trail ==
The Butterfield Overland Mail route was a stagecoach route chosen to be snow-free unlike the more northern but shorter routes in place at the time. It ran from St. Louis, Missouri to San Francisco, California beginning in 1858. This segment overlapped a historic road known as the "State Road" in Arkansas, itself a formerly well-traveled Native American removal route from Springfield, Missouri to Fayetteville in the 1830s. Fitzgerald Station served along the route between Mudtown, Cross Hollows, and Callahan's Tavern to the north and Fayetteville to the south. Fitzgerald Station likely benefited from its reputation among travelers prior to the establishment of the Butterfield Trail.

== Present day ==
Today, the road running in front of Fitzgerald Station is called Old Wire Road, paying homage to the telegraph lines that eventually supplanted the horse-powered mail delivery of the Butterfield Trail. Highway 265 runs along Old Wire Road near the property, and roughly follows the original stage route of the 1850s. The trail has been recognized as a segment of the Butterfield Trail and the Trail of Tears (Northern Route) within the Arkansas Heritage Trails Network, as well as the Trail of Tears within the National Historic Trail System. The University of Arkansas and Arkansas Archaeological Survey conducted a remote sensing survey using magnetic gradiometry and electric resistivity in an attempt to locate the historic tavern, log cabin house, or original wagon path through the property. The group believed that the log cabin and tavern were located where the 1870s house was constructed, and the results were inconclusive for the original location of the aforementioned. An excavation commenced in February 2005, in which it was determined that the soil cut to form the house's basement was spread throughout the site. A midden strata was encountered, as well as several fragments of broken whiteware, consistent with a tavern.

== See also ==
- Butterfield Overland Mail Route Fayetteville Segments Historic District
- Butterfield Overland Mail Route Segment
- Potts Inn: stagecoach stop in Pottsville, Arkansas
- National Register of Historic Places listings in Washington County, Arkansas
