= Cove Creek Township, Washington County, Arkansas =

Township of Cove Creek
- Township
- Location of Cove Creek Township in Washington County

- Location of Washington County in Arkansas
- Coordinates: 35°49′00″N 94°18′00″W
- Country: United States
- State: Arkansas
- County: Washington
- Established: 1842

Area
  - Total: 45.9 sq mi (119 km^{2})
  - Land: 45.9 sq mi (119 km^{2})
  - Water: 0.0 sq mi (0 km^{2}) 0%
- Elevation: 1,860 ft (570 m)

Population (2000)
  - Total: 683
  - Density: 15/sq mi (5.8/km^{2})
- Time zone: UTC-6 (CST)
  - Summer (DST): UTC-5 (CDT)
- Area code: 479
- GNIS feature ID: 69783

Township of Cove Creek is one of 37 townships in Washington County, Arkansas, USA. As of the 2000 census, its total population was 683. Part of Devil's Den State Park is located in Cove Creek Township.

== Geography ==
According to the United States Census Bureau, Cove Creek Township covers an area of 45.9 square miles (119 km^{2}); all land. Cove Creek Township was created in 1842 from parts of Mountain Township. It gave part to Lee's Creek Township in 1880.

=== Cities, towns, villages ===
- Strickler

=== Cemeteries ===
The township contains Dunkard, Liberty, Morrow, and Scott Cemeteries.

=== Major routes ===
- Arkansas Highway 170
- Arkansas Highway 265
