= Lee's Creek Township, Washington County, Arkansas =

Township of Lee's Creek
- Township
- Location of Lee's Creek Township in Washington County

- Location of Washington County in Arkansas
- Coordinates: 35°49′0″N 94°11′46″W
- Country: United States
- State: Arkansas
- County: Washington
- Established: 1880

Area
  - Total: 33.1 sq mi (86 km^{2})
  - Land: 33.1 sq mi (86 km^{2})
  - Water: 0.0 sq mi (0 km^{2}) 0%
- Elevation: 1,828 ft (557 m)

Population (2000)
  - Total: 640
  - Density: 19/sq mi (7.3/km^{2})
- Time zone: UTC-6 (CST)
  - Summer (DST): UTC-5 (CDT)
- Area code: 479
- GNIS feature ID: 69793

Lee's Creek Township is one of thirty-seven townships in Washington County, Arkansas, USA. As of the 2000 census, its total population was 640.

Lee's Creek Township was established in 1880.

== Geography ==
According to the United States Census Bureau, Johnson Township covers an area of 33.1 square miles (86 km^{2}), all land. Devil's Den State Park makes up the southern tip of the township. The township was created from parts of Cove Creek Township and Crawford Township in 1880.

=== Cities, towns, villages ===
- Blackburn

=== Cemeteries ===
The township contains Blackburn Cemetery.

=== Major routes ===
- Interstate 540
- Arkansas Highway 74
- Arkansas Highway 170
