= Red River Bridge =

Red River Bridge may refer to:

- Red River Bridge (Arkansas)
- Cane Hill Road Bridge, near Prairie Grove, Arkansas, also known as Little Red River Bridge
- U.S. 165 Business Bridge, also known as Red River Bridge, in Alexandria, Louisiana
- Sorlie Memorial Bridge, Grand Forks, North Dakota, also known as Red River Bridge
- State Highway No. 78 Bridge at the Red River

== See also ==
- Red River Bridge War
- Red River (disambiguation)
