= Boston Mountains Scenic Loop =

Highway in Arkansas

Boston Mountains Scenic Loop
- Boston Mountains Scenic Loop highlighted in red (I-49) and blue (US 71)

Section 1
- Length: 38 mi (61 km)
- South end: I-40, Alma
- North end: I-49, Fayetteville

Section 2
- Length: 42 mi (68 km)
- South end: I-40, Alma
- North end: US 71, Fayetteville

Location
- Country: United States
- State: Arkansas

Highway system
- Arkansas Highway System; Interstate; US; State; Business; Spurs; Suffixed; Scenic; Heritage

The Boston Mountains Scenic Loop is one of ten Arkansas Scenic Byways. There are two different paths that constitute the loop, Interstate 49 and U.S. Route 71.

== Route description ==
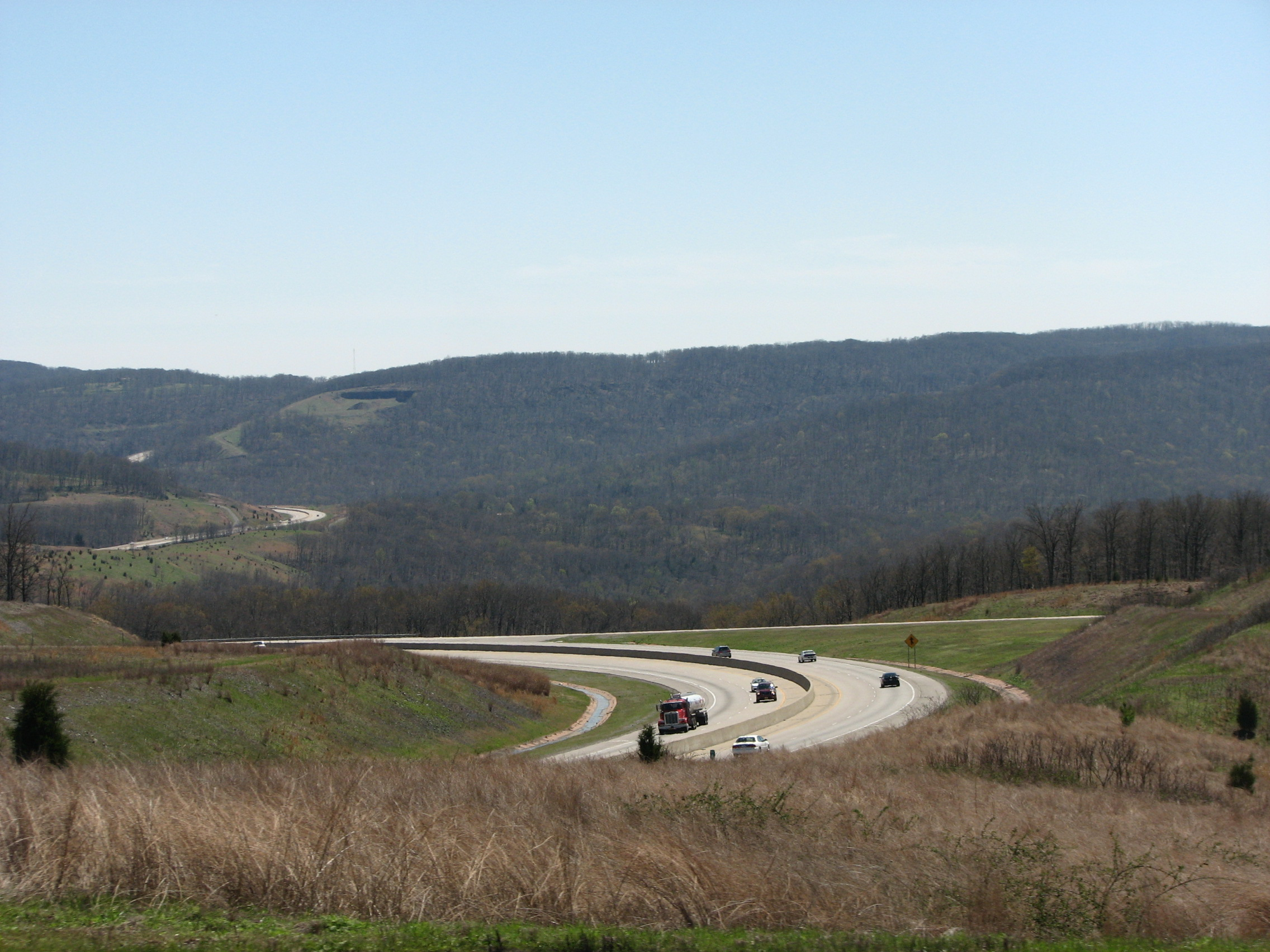
I-49 near Winslow

=== I-49 ===
The route runs through the Boston Mountains (a subsection of The Ozarks) in Arkansas for 38 miles (61 km) in Crawford and Washington Counties. The route begins at Alma and runs north to Fayetteville. The route includes the Bobby Hopper Tunnel, the only road tunnel in Arkansas. This portion of I-49 was completed in 1999, when it was part of I-540, to bypass the aging US 71.

=== US 71 ===
Also part of the loop is 42 miles (68 km) of US 71 between Alma and Fayetteville. The US 71 segment allows travelers to go at their own pace through the area. There are many areas and a number of small towns to stop and explore along the US 71 segment as opposed to the bustling interstate segment that bypasses these areas and towns.

=== Points of interest ===
- Devil's Den State Park
- Beaver Lake
- Butterfield Overland Mail
- Lake Fort Smith State Park
- Prairie Grove Battlefield State Park
- Fort Smith National Historic Site
- Van Buren Historic District
- Ozark Highlands Trail
- Pea Ridge National Military Park
- Buffalo National River
- Ozark National Forest
- White Rock Mountain Recreation Area
- Lake Wedington Recreation Area
- University of Arkansas

== History ==
The first routes through the area were Native American Trails, later formalized into the Ozark Highlands Trails. These rough roads became obsolete with the establishment of the Butterfield Overland Mail, a stagecoach route from St. Louis, Missouri to San Francisco, California that traversed the Boston Mountains in Northwest Arkansas. This route has been preserved in part as Arkansas Highway 265 and is well marked throughout Fayetteville and other Northwest Arkansas cities. US 71 replaced the stagecoach route when the United States Numbered Highways system came to Arkansas in 1926.

U.S. Route 71 in conjunction with Arkansas Highway 23 served the Northwest Arkansas area for many years, but as the area grew the routes became congested. The need for a limited-access highway became apparent, and Interstate 49 was completed through the area by 1999.
