= Blackburn, Arkansas =

- Unincorporated community
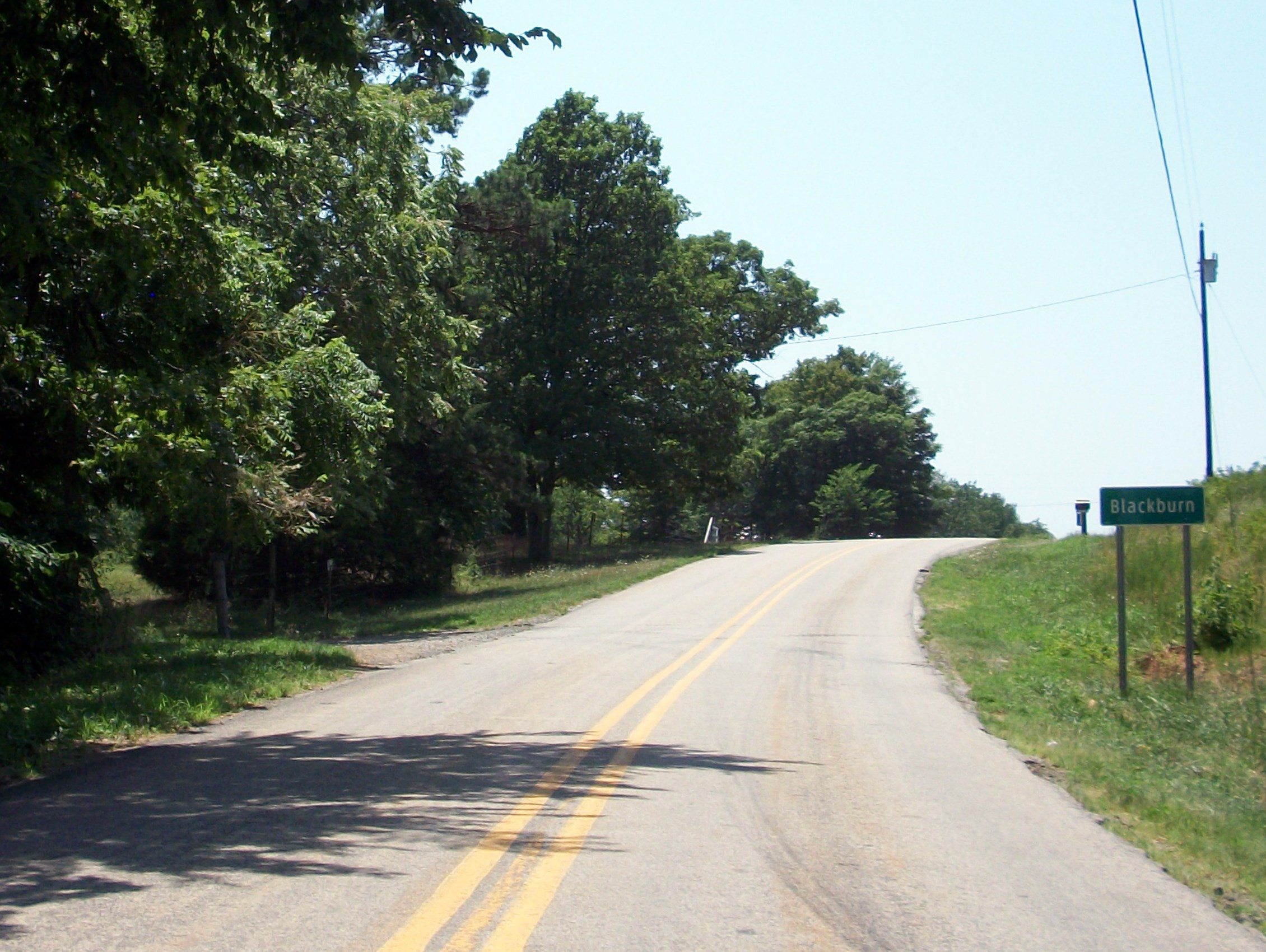
- Entrance to Blackburn on Highway 74

- Blackburn's position in Arkansas. Blackburn, Arkansas (the United States)
- Coordinates: 35°48′59″N 94°13′11″W
- Country: United States
- State: Arkansas
- County: Washington
- Township: Lee's Creek
- Elevation: 1,890 ft (576 m)
- Time zone: UTC-6 (Central (CST))
  - Summer (DST): UTC-5 (CDT)
- Area code: 479
- GNIS feature ID: 70703

Blackburn is an unincorporated community in Lee's Creek Township, Washington County, Arkansas, United States. It is located on Arkansas Highway 74, northeast of Devil's Den State Park.

A post office called Blackburn was established in 1880, and remained in operation until 1952.
