= Arkansas Highway 156 (1973–1981) =

Former state highway in Arkansas, United States

Highway 156
- Gulley Road
- Former AR 156 highlighted in blue

Route information
- Maintained by AHTD
- Length: 2.53 mi (4.07 km)
- Existed: June 28, 1973–October 14, 1981

Major junctions
- West end: Old Wire Road
- East end: AR 45

Location
- Country: United States
- State: Arkansas

Highway system
- Arkansas Highway System; Interstate; US; State; Business; Spurs; Suffixed; Scenic; Heritage
← AR 155	→ AR 157

Highway 156 (AR 156, Ark. 156, Hwy. 156, and Gulley Road) is a former state highway in Washington County, Arkansas. Between 1973 and 1981, the highway was maintained by the Arkansas State Highway and Transportation Department (AHTD), now known as the Arkansas Department of Transportation (ArDOT).

== Route description ==
The highway began at Old Wire Road in eastern Washington County between Fayetteville and Springdale. AR 156 wound south and east through a rural area of the Ozark Mountains to AR 45, where it terminated.

== History ==
In 1973, the Arkansas General Assembly passed Act 9 of 1973. The act directed county judges and legislators to designate up to 12 miles (19 km) of county roads as state highways in each county. Highway 156 was designated along Gulley Road in Washington County in accordance with the act by the Arkansas State Highway Commission on June 28, 1973. It was deleted at the request of the Washington County Judge in exchange for designation of a county road as Highway 74 near Brentwood.

== Major intersections ==
The entire route was in Washington County.

Location	mi	km	Destinations	Notes
	0.00	0.00	Old Wire Road	Western terminus
	2.53	4.07	AR 45	Eastern terminus
1.000 mi = 1.609 km; 1.000 km = 0.621 mi
