= Center Township, Washington County, Arkansas =

Township of Center
- Township
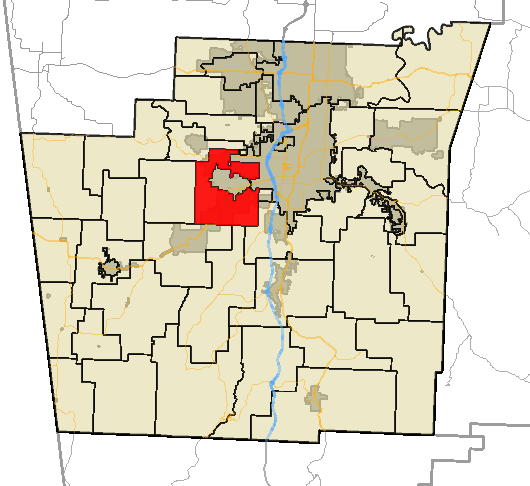
- Center Township in Washington County, Arkansas
- Coordinates: 36°02′45″N 94°15′46″W
- Country: United States
- State: Arkansas
- County: Washington
- Established: 1880

Area
  - Total: 9.13 sq mi (23.6 km^{2})
  - Land: 9.09 sq mi (23.5 km^{2})
  - Water: 0.04 sq mi (0.10 km^{2}) 0%
- Elevation: 1,214 ft (370 m)

Population (2010)
  - Total: 1,518
  - Density: 167/sq mi (64/km^{2})
- Time zone: UTC-6 (CST)
  - Summer (DST): UTC-5 (CDT)
- Area code: 479
- GNIS feature ID: 69782

Center Township is one of 37 townships in Washington County, Arkansas, USA. At the 2010 census, its total population was 1,518.

Center Township was established in 1880.

== Geography ==
According to the United States Census Bureau, Center Township covers an area of 21.3 square miles (55 km^{2}); all land. Center Township was created in 1880 from parts of Prairie and Marrs Hill Townships. It has three disconnected sections.

=== Cities, towns, villages ===
- Appleby
- Starks
- Walnut Grove

=== Cemeteries ===
The township contains one cemetery, Cemetery Hill.

=== Major routes ===
- U.S. Route 62
- Arkansas Highway 170
