= Arkansas Highway 156 (1980–2007) =

Former state highway in Arkansas, United States

Highway 156
- Baggett Street
- Former AR 156 highlighted in blue

Route information
- Maintained by AHTD
- Length: 0.37 mi (600 m)
- Existed: January 30, 1980–May 23, 2007

Major junctions
- West end: US 62 in Prairie Grove
- East end: End state maintenance at Sedgewick Drive

Location
- Country: United States
- State: Arkansas

Highway system
- Arkansas Highway System; Interstate; US; State; Business; Spurs; Suffixed; Scenic; Heritage
← AR 155	→ AR 157

Highway 156 (AR 156, Ark. 156, Hwy. 156, and Baggett Street) is a former state highway in Prairie Grove, Arkansas. Between 1980 and 2007, the highway was maintained by the Arkansas State Highway and Transportation Department (AHTD), now known as the Arkansas Department of Transportation (ArDOT).

== Route description ==
The highway began at US 62 in Prairie Grove and ran south to a factory.

== History ==
Highway 156 was created upon the request of Prairie Grove to provide a state maintained road for a new factory in the town in 1980. The city later requested the highway's maintenance responsibilities be turned over to their jurisdiction, a request granted by the Arkansas State Highway Commission in 2007.

== Major intersections ==
The entire route is in Prairie Grove, Washington County.

mi	km	Destinations	Notes
0.00	0.00	US 62 (Buchanan Street)	Western terminus
0.37	0.60	End state maintenance at Sedgewick Drive	Eastern terminus
1.000 mi = 1.609 km; 1.000 km = 0.621 mi
