= Starks, Arkansas =

- Unincorporated community
- Starks's position in Arkansas. Starks, Arkansas (the United States)
- Coordinates: 36°01′42″N 94°16′00″W
- Country: United States
- State: Arkansas
- County: Washington
- Township: Center
- Elevation: 1,253 ft (382 m)
- Time zone: UTC-6 (Central (CST))
  - Summer (DST): UTC-5 (CDT)
- Area code: 479
- GNIS feature ID: 65458

Starks is an unincorporated community in Center Township, Washington County, Arkansas, United States. It is located on U.S. Route 62 between Farmington and Prairie Grove.
