= Appleby, Arkansas =

- Unincorporated community
- Appleby's position in Arkansas. Appleby, Arkansas (the United States)
- Coordinates: 36°01′16″N 94°14′47″W
- Country: United States
- State: Arkansas
- County: Washington
- Township: Center
- Elevation: 1,220 ft (370 m)
- Time zone: UTC-6 (Central (CST))
  - Summer (DST): UTC-5 (CDT)
- Area code: 479
- GNIS feature ID: 56906

Appleby is an unincorporated community in Center Township, Washington County, Arkansas, United States. It is located on Arkansas Highway 170, south of Farmington and four miles southwest of Fayetteville.
