= Walnut Grove, Washington County, Arkansas =

Walnut Grove, Arkansas
- Unincorporated community
- Walnut Grove's position in Arkansas. Walnut Grove, Arkansas (the United States)
- Coordinates: 36°00′13″N 94°16′02″W
- Country: United States
- State: Arkansas
- County: Washington
- Township: Center
- Elevation: 1,161 ft (354 m)
- Time zone: UTC-6 (Central (CST))
  - Summer (DST): UTC-5 (CDT)
- Area code: 479
- GNIS feature ID: 73997

Walnut Grove is an unincorporated community in Center Township, Washington County, Arkansas, United States. It is located on Arkansas Highway 170, south of Farmington.
