= Potts Inn =

- U.S. National Register of Historic Places
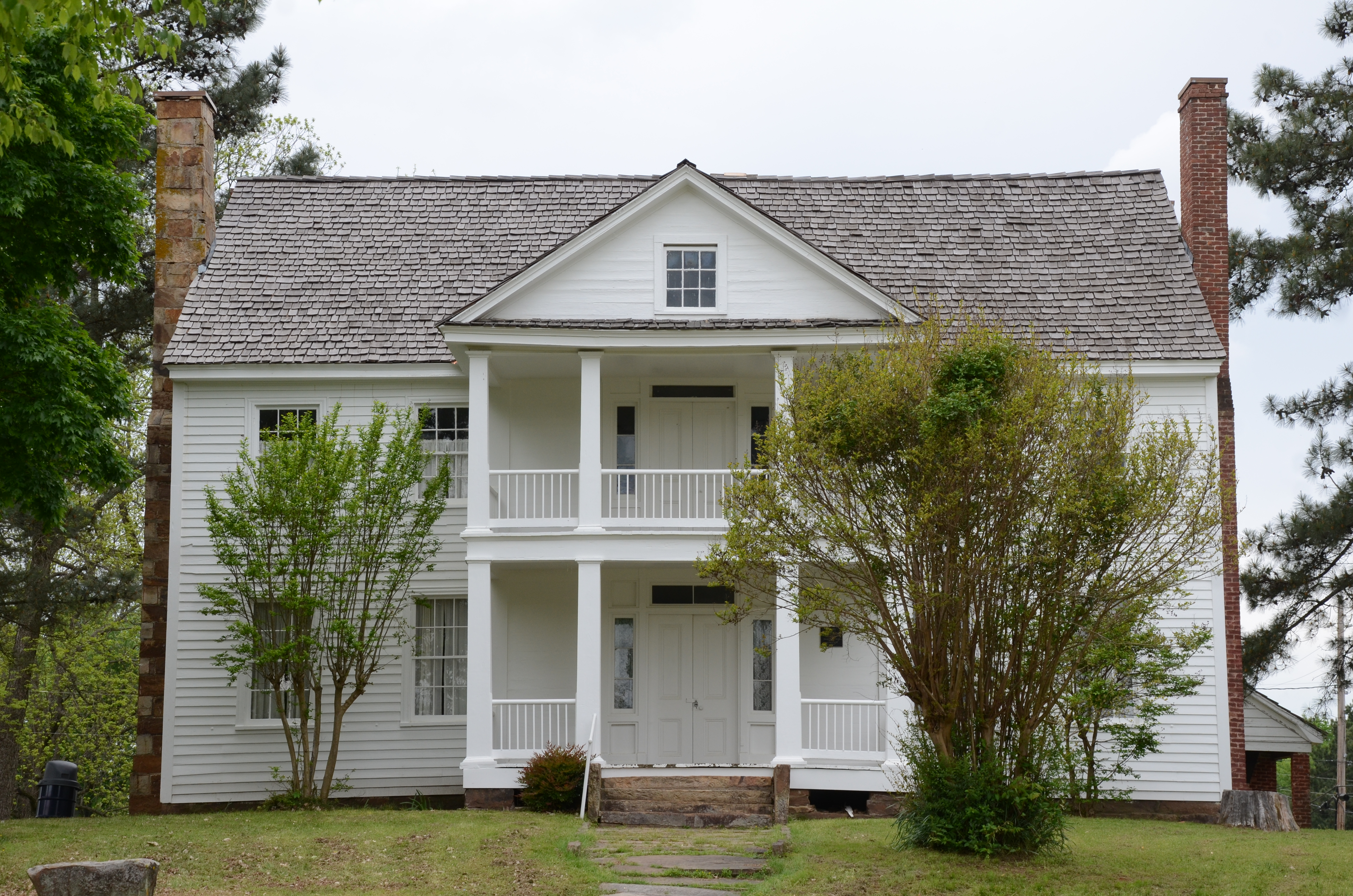

- Location within Arkansas Location within the United States
- Location: Main and Center Sts., Pottsville, Arkansas
- Coordinates: 35°14′54″N 93°2′42″W
- Area: 0.2 acres (0.081 ha)
- NRHP reference No.: 70000123
- Added to NRHP: June 22, 1970

The Potts Inn is a historic former stagecoach inn at Main and Center Streets in Pottsville, Arkansas that is now a museum. It is a two-story wood-frame structure, with a side gable roof and weatherboard siding. A two-story gabled portico projects at the center of the front, supported by square posts. Entrances on both levels have overhead transom windows. The inn was built in 1858 by Kirkbride Potts, a Pennsylvania native, and is one of the finest antebellum houses in the region.

The building was listed on the National Register of Historic Places in 1970.

== See also ==
- Fitzgerald Station and Farmstead: stagecoach stop in Springdale, Arkansas
- National Register of Historic Places listings in Pope County, Arkansas
