= Arkansas Highway 170 =

State highway in Arkansas, United States

Highway 170

Route information
- Maintained by ArDOT
- Existed: c. 1936-1937–present

Section 1
- Length: 17.31 mi (27.86 km)
- South end: AR 74 / AR 220 at Devil's Den State Park
- North end: US 71 in West Fork

Section 2
- Length: 5.44 mi (8.75 km)
- West end: US 62 in Prairie Grove
- East end: US 62 in Farmington

Location
- Country: United States
- State: Arkansas

Highway system
- Arkansas Highway System; Interstate; US; State; Business; Spurs; Suffixed; Scenic; Heritage
← AR 169	→ AR 171

Arkansas Highway 170 (AR 170, Hwy. 170) is a designation for two state highways in Washington County, Arkansas. The main segment of 17.31 miles (27.86 km) runs from Devil's Den State Park to West Fork. A shorter segment of 5.44 miles (8.75 km) runs from U.S. Route 62 (US 62) through Appleby before reconnecting with US 62.

== Route description ==
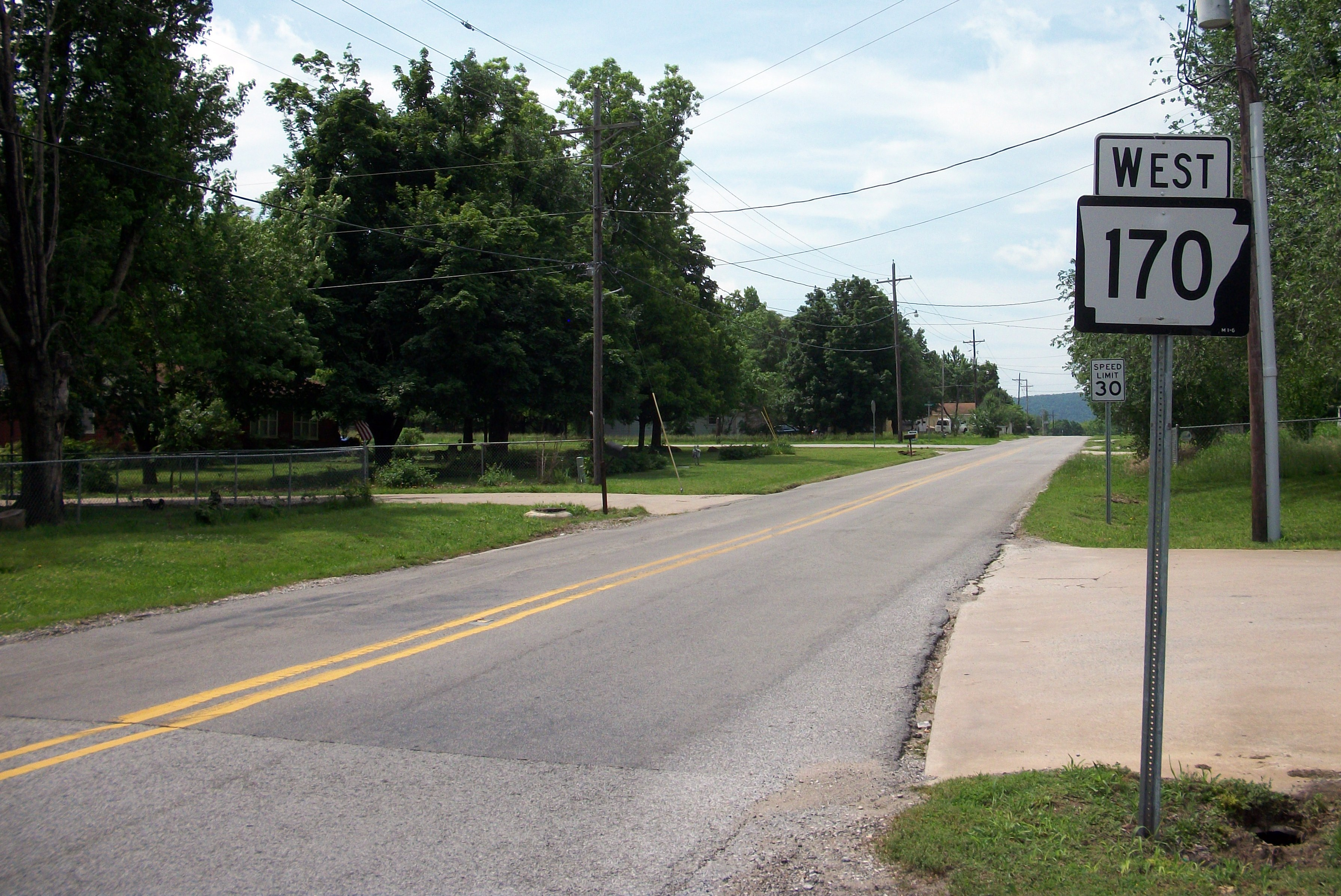
AR 170 runs west from US 62 in Farmington.

=== Devil's Den State Park to West Fork ===
AR 170 begins at a three-way junction with AR 74 and AR 220 in Devil's Den State Park. The route runs north, winding through steep Ozark topography. AR 170 serves as the southern terminus of AR 265 near the SEFOR reactor. The highway continues north through rural country, crossing over I-49. East of the expressway, AR 170 enters West Fork. The route enters town as Phillips St, turns south onto McKnight St, and turns left onto Main St. AR 170 continues to US Route 71, where the route terminates.

=== Walnut Grove to Farmington ===
AR 170 begins at US 62 at Walnut Grove (northeast of Prairie Grove) and runs north/northeast to US 62 in Farmington. The route runs over the Cane Hill Road Bridge, and serves Appleby.

== History ==
The highway was created between 1936 and 1937 as a semicircle loop from Winslow to US 71 near West Fork via Devil's Den State Park.

In Farmington, AR 170 follows the original 1926 alignment of AR 45 which later became US 62.

== Major intersections ==
The entire route is in Washington County.

Location	mi	km	Destinations	Notes
Devil's Den State Park	0.0	0.0	AR 74 east / AR 220 south (Lee Creek Rd) – Winslow	Western terminus, AR 74/AR 220 termini
	5.9	9.5	AR 265 north – Hogeye	AR 265 southern terminus
West Fork	14.8	23.8	AR 156 west (Hogeye Rd)	AR 156 eastern terminus
West Fork	15.0	24.1	I-49 – Fort Smith, Fayetteville	Exit 53 on I-49; former I-540
West Fork	16.4	26.4	US 71 (Centennial Ave) – Winslow, Fayetteville	Eastern terminus
Gap in route
Prairie Grove	0.00	0.00	US 62 – Farmington, Lincoln	Western terminus
Farmington	5.44	8.75	US 62 (E Main St)	Eastern terminus
1.000 mi = 1.609 km; 1.000 km = 0.621 mi
