= Strickler, Arkansas =

- Unincorporated community
- Strickler's position in Arkansas. Strickler, Arkansas (the United States)
- Coordinates: 35°50′01″N 94°18′48″W
- Country: United States
- State: Arkansas
- County: Washington
- Township: Cove Creek
- Established: 1837
- Elevation: 1,512 ft (461 m)
- Time zone: UTC-6 (Central (CST))
  - Summer (DST): UTC-5 (CDT)
- Area code: 479
- GNIS feature ID: 78474

Strickler (formerly Stricklers) is an unincorporated community in Cove Creek Township, Washington County, Arkansas, United States. It is located on Arkansas Highway 265, northwest of Devil's Den State Park.

== History ==
The area was settled by Benjamin and Mary Strickler in 1837. A post office for the Greenville community (which would become Strickler) was open from 1854 to 1874, and the Strickler post office was open through 1878–1943. The community was located on the Butterfield Overland Mail route.
