= Butterfield Overland Mail Route Segment =

- U.S. National Register of Historic Places
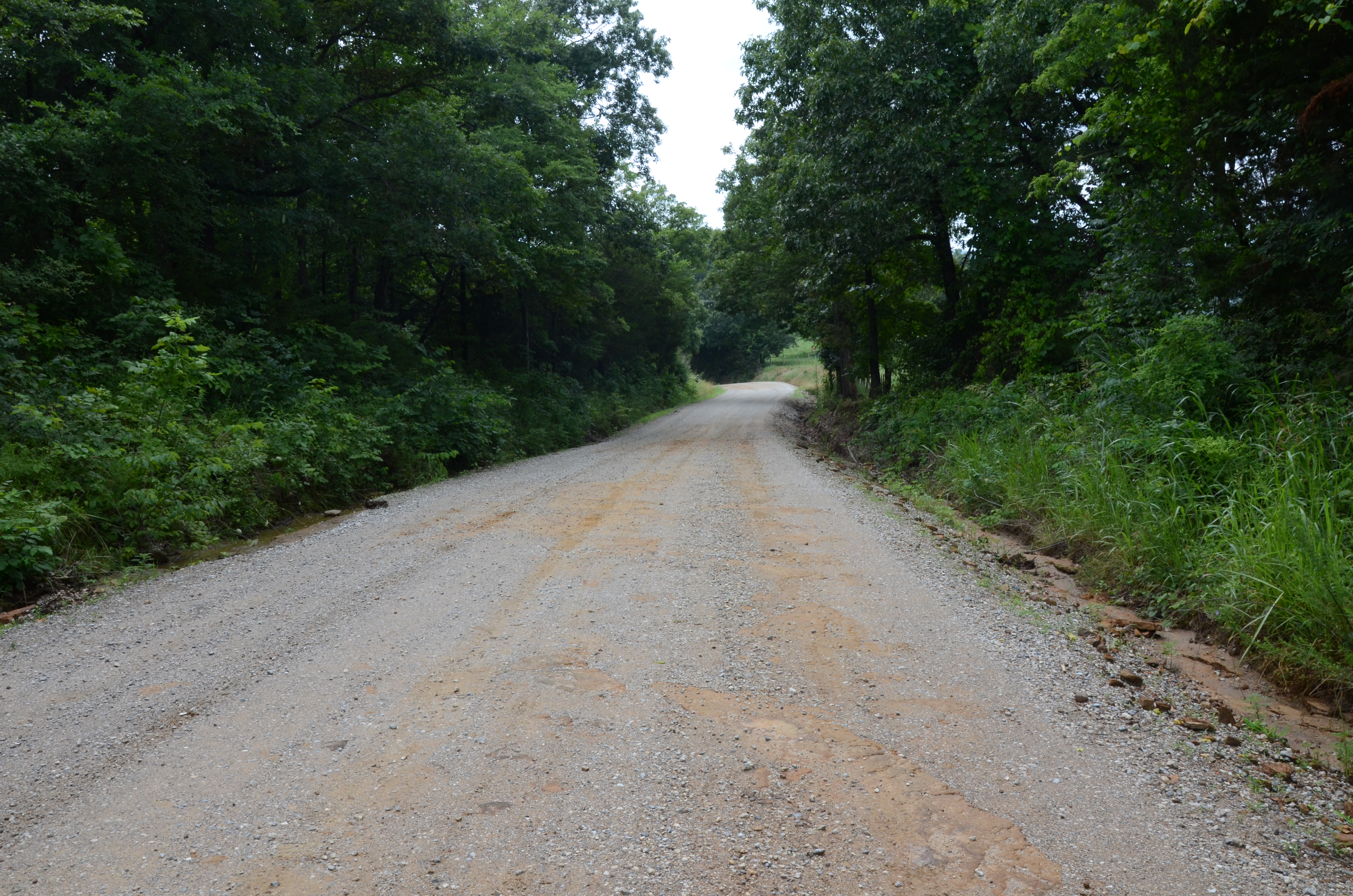

- Location within Arkansas Location within the United States
- Nearest city: Strickler, Arkansas
- Coordinates: 35°47′22″N 94°20′21″W
- Area: 51.8 acres (21.0 ha)
- NRHP reference No.: 10000347
- Added to NRHP: June 9, 2010

The Butterfield Overland Mail Route Segment is a stretch of historic roadway in Washington and Crawford counties in northwestern Arkansas. It consists of more than 13 miles (21 km) of adjoining sections of Bugscuffle and Old Cove City Roads that were once part of the major north–south route between Fayetteville and Van Buren, which are documented to have existed since 1839. The roadway is still a dirt road, about 12 feet (3.7 m) wide. It was historically used by the Butterfield Overland Mail service between 1858 and 1861.

The roadway segment was listed on the National Register of Historic Places in 2010.

== See also ==
- National Register of Historic Places listings in Washington County, Arkansas
- National Register of Historic Places listings in Crawford County, Arkansas
