= Hogeye, Arkansas =

- Unincorporated community
- Hogeye's position in Arkansas. Hogeye, Arkansas (the United States)
- Coordinates: 35°55′13.3″N 94°16′3.7″W
- Country: United States
- State: Arkansas
- County: Washington
- Township: Valley
- Elevation: 1,243 ft (379 m)
- Time zone: UTC-6 (Central (CST))
  - Summer (DST): UTC-5 (CDT)
- Zip Code: 72753
- Area code: 479
- GNIS feature ID: 81869

Hogeye is an unincorporated community in Valley Township, Washington County, Arkansas, United States. It is located on Arkansas Highway 265 and Arkansas Highway 156.

Hogeye was said to be "no bigger than a hog's eye", hence the name.

The Hogeye Marathon initially ran from Fayetteville to Hogeye, but the marathon now runs in Springdale.

== History ==
According to the Washington County Records Department, the community of Hogeye was previously known by several names including Billingsley, Glenroy, and Moffitt. The earliest mention of Hogeye in county records was in 1860. The community was officially known as Glenroy, but commonly known as Billingsley.

The Billingsley Post Office was established in 1854(Park's Station, a stop along the Butterfield Stagecoach and Butterfield Overland Mail Route), and remained there until 1887.

1877–1886, Billingsley is shown in the tax records. The community was listed as Moffitt in the 1908 Atlas Of Washington County.

According to county tax records, the community had at least one grocery, liquor store, and a canning factory.

== School ==
School District 31 was established in 1871, later known as Shady Grove School. Administratively consolidated with West Fork in 1946.

== Church ==
The Billingsley Church appears in the oldest of country records and maps of the area. The building served as Church, Community Center, Voting Precinct, and as an enlistment center for the American Civil War.
