= Cane Hill Road Bridge =

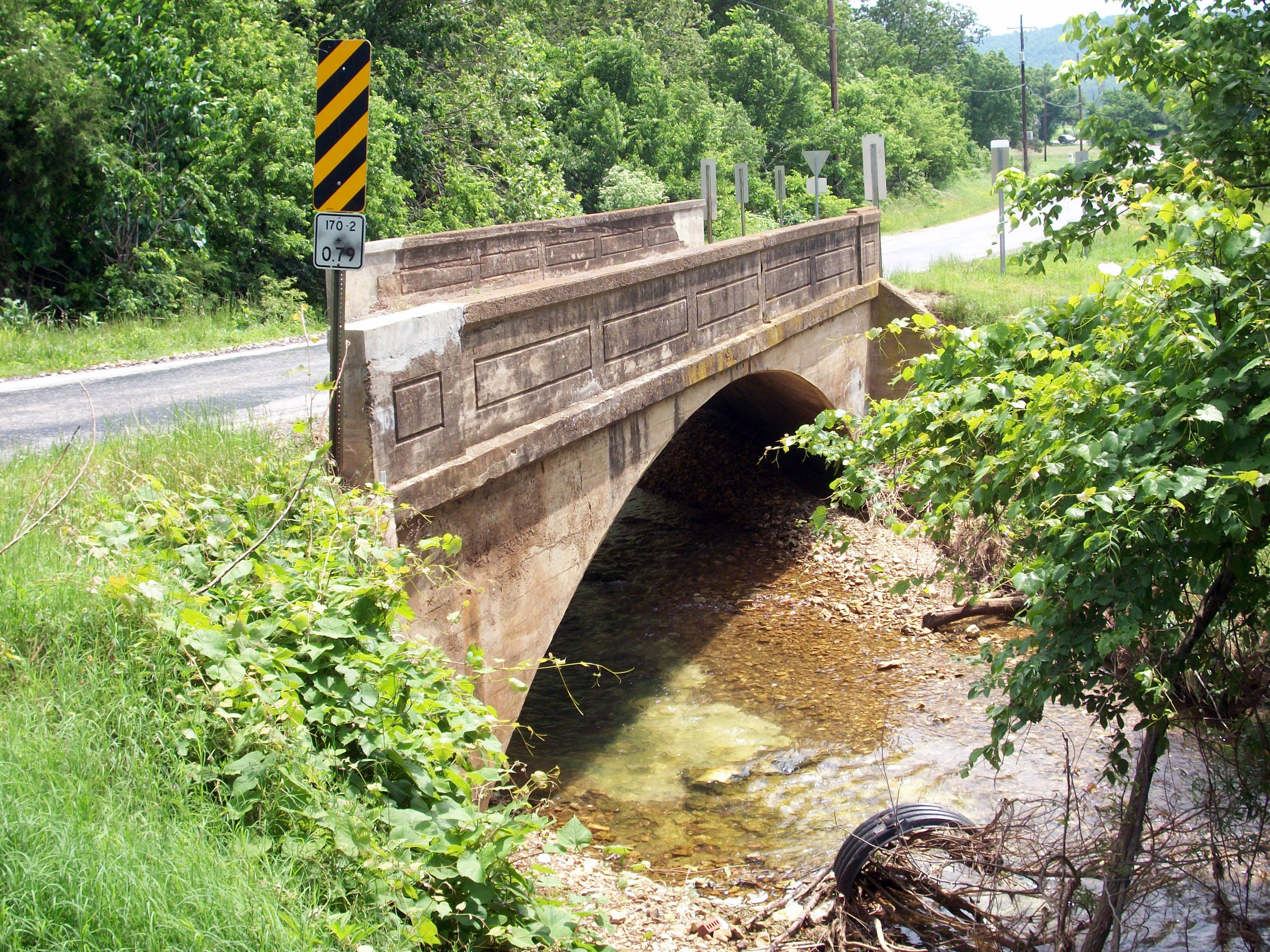
- Coordinates: 36°00′00″N 94°16′30″W
- Carries: AR 170
- Crosses: Little Red River
- Locale: near Prairie Grove, Arkansas

Characteristics
- Design: closed-spandrel arch
- Material: Concrete
- Total length: 47.9 feet (14.6 m)
- No. of spans: 1

History
- Construction end: 1923
- Closed: 2015
- Cane Hill Road Bridge
- U.S. National Register of Historic Places
- Location within Arkansas Location within the United States
- Nearest city: Prairie Grove, Arkansas
- Coordinates: 36°0′0.84″N 94°16′29.59″W
- Area: Washington County
- Built: 1923
- Architect: Luten Bridge Co. of Knoxville, Tennessee
- Architectural style: Closed-spandrel arch
- MPS: Historic Bridges of Arkansas
- NRHP reference No.: 09001261
- AHTD No.: M2202
- Added to NRHP: January 21, 2010

Location
- Interactive map of Cane Hill Road Bridge

The Cane Hill Road Bridge (also Little Red River Bridge) was a closed-spandrel arch bridge built in 1923 located near Prairie Grove, Arkansas. It carried Arkansas Highway 170 over the Little Red River, and was in 2014 in the process of being bypassed. The bridge has a single span about 43 feet (13 m) in length, with an overall bridge length of 48 feet (15 m). The bridge is 15 feet (4.6 m) wide. AR 170 was the major north–south route in the area when the bridge was built, but this section has since been bypassed by the construction of United States Route 62. The bridge was built by the Luten Bridge Company of Knoxville, Tennessee.

The bridge was listed on the National Register of Historic Places in 2010. The bridge was replaced by a box culvert.

== See also ==
- National Register of Historic Places listings in Washington County, Arkansas
- List of bridges on the National Register of Historic Places in Arkansas
