= Arkansas Highway 265 =

State highway in Arkansas, United States

Highway 265
- Dick Trammel Highway

Route information
- Maintained by ArDOT

Section 1
- Length: 19.70 mi (31.70 km)
- South end: AR 170 near Stricker
- North end: I-49 / US 71 / AR 16 in Fayetteville

Section 2
- Length: 18.21 mi (29.31 km)
- South end: AR 16 in Fayetteville
- North end: AR 94 in Rogers

Location
- Country: United States
- State: Arkansas
- Counties: Washington, Benton

Highway system
- Arkansas Highway System; Interstate; US; State; Business; Spurs; Suffixed; Scenic; Heritage
← AR 264	→ AR 266

Arkansas Highway 265 (AR 265) is a designation for two state highways in Northwest Arkansas. The southern segment of 19.70 miles (31.70 km) runs from Highway 170 near Strickler north to Interstate 49 (I-49) in Fayetteville. A second segment runs from Highway 16 in Fayetteville north to Highway 94 in Rogers. Parts of all two segments are former lengths of the Butterfield Stagecoach Route, a route established in 1857 that carried United States mail from St. Louis, Missouri to San Francisco, California.

== Route description ==
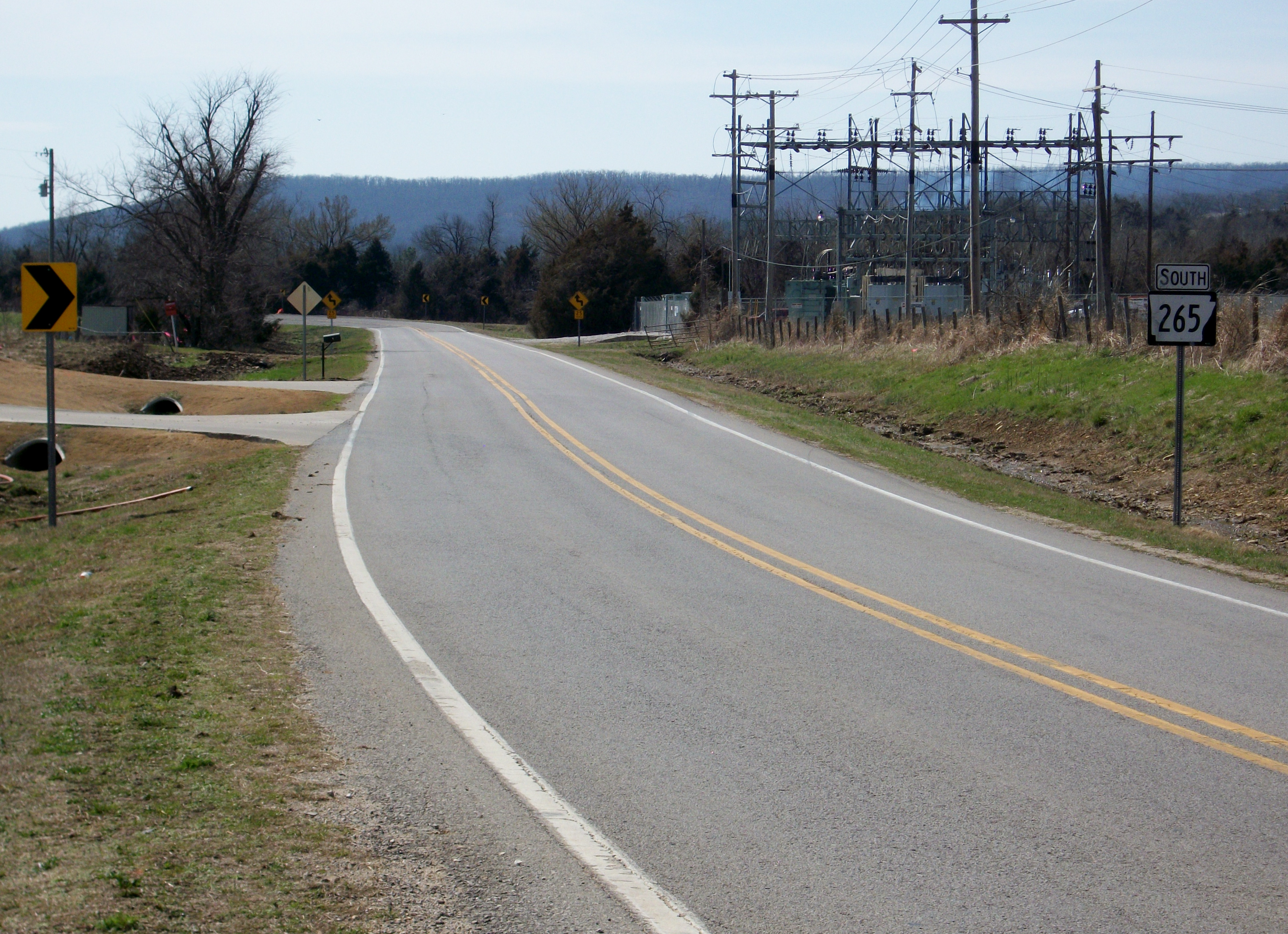
Highway 265 runs in west Greenland.

=== Strickler to Fayetteville ===
AR 265 begins in a rural part of southern Washington County within the Northwest Arkansas and Ozark Mountain regions. Starting at an intersection with Highway 170, the highway runs near SEFOR, a deactivated experimental fast breeder reactor before passing through the unincorporated community of Strickler. Continuing north as a winding, two-lane highway, the highway passes near the headwaters of the Illinois River and serves as the western terminus of AR 156 at Hogeye. Upon entering Greenland, AR 265 intersects Wilson Street, which gives access to Interstate 49 (I-49). AR 265 continues north into Fayetteville, passing the Kessler Mountain Regional Park and beginning to parallel the Razorback Greenway. The route meets I-49 southbound and an unsigned AR 16. The route terminates at the I-49 on/off ramps, with the roadway continuing as AR 16.

=== Fayetteville to Springdale ===
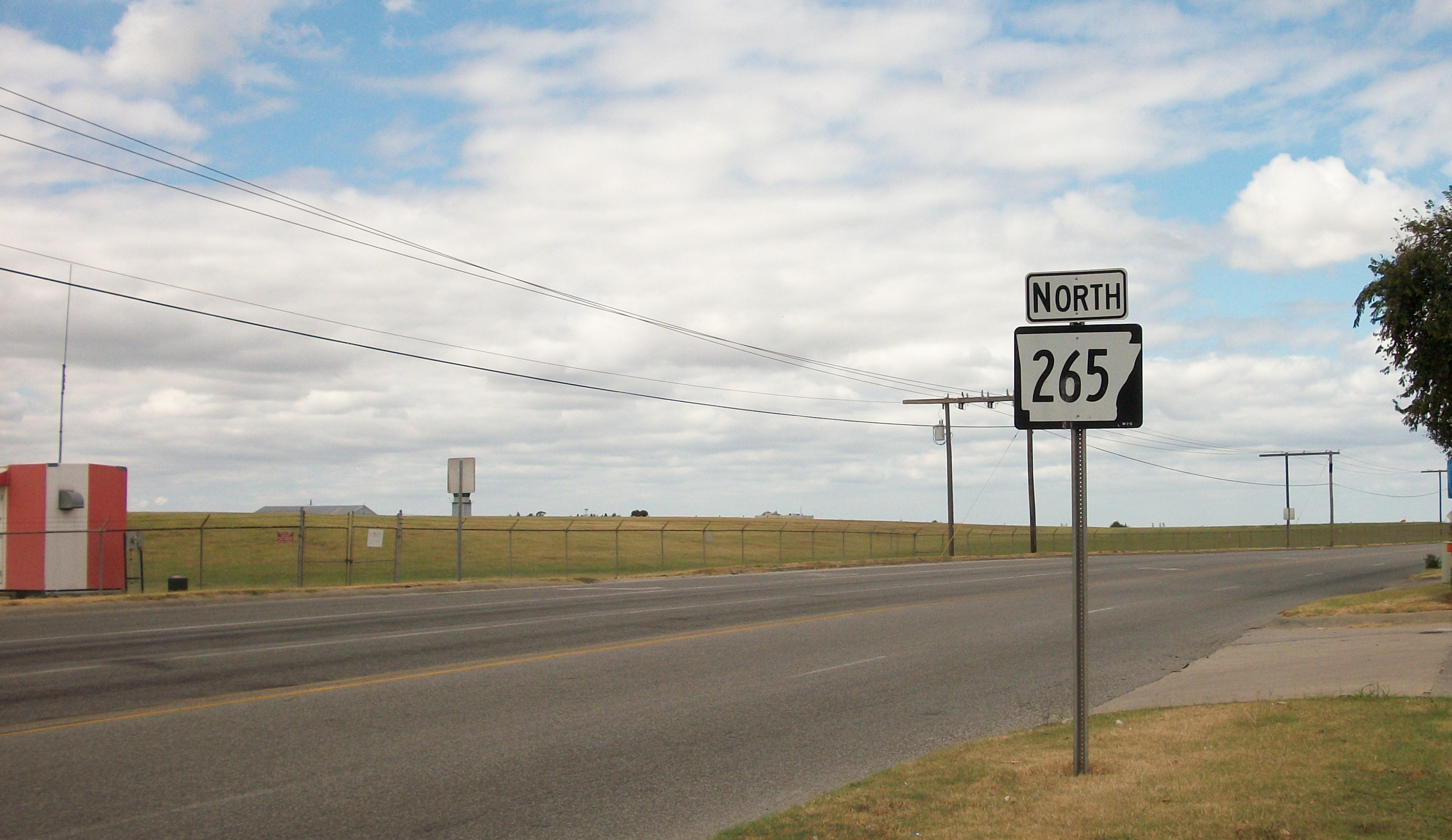
Highway 265 near the Springdale Municipal Airport north of the junction with US 412.

The route begins again at Highway 16 in southeast Fayetteville. The highway serves as the entrance to many communities, and is four-lane with center turn lane throughout Fayetteville. Highway 265 intersects Highway 45, Township Road, Joyce Blvd, Don Tyson Parkway, and US 412 before reaching the Springdale Municipal Airport. The route continues north, entering Benton County and intersecting Highway 264 in Bethel Heights. Continuing north, Highway 265 passes through undeveloped areas of Bethel Heights and Lowell without any state highway junctions as a two-lane road with a two-way left turn lane to Rogers, where it terminates at Highway 94 (New Hope Road).

=== Pea Ridge to Missouri ===
A third segment begins at Highway 94 west of Pea Ridge and runs north to the Missouri state line before where it becomes Missouri Route KK. It is decommissioned in 2025

== History ==
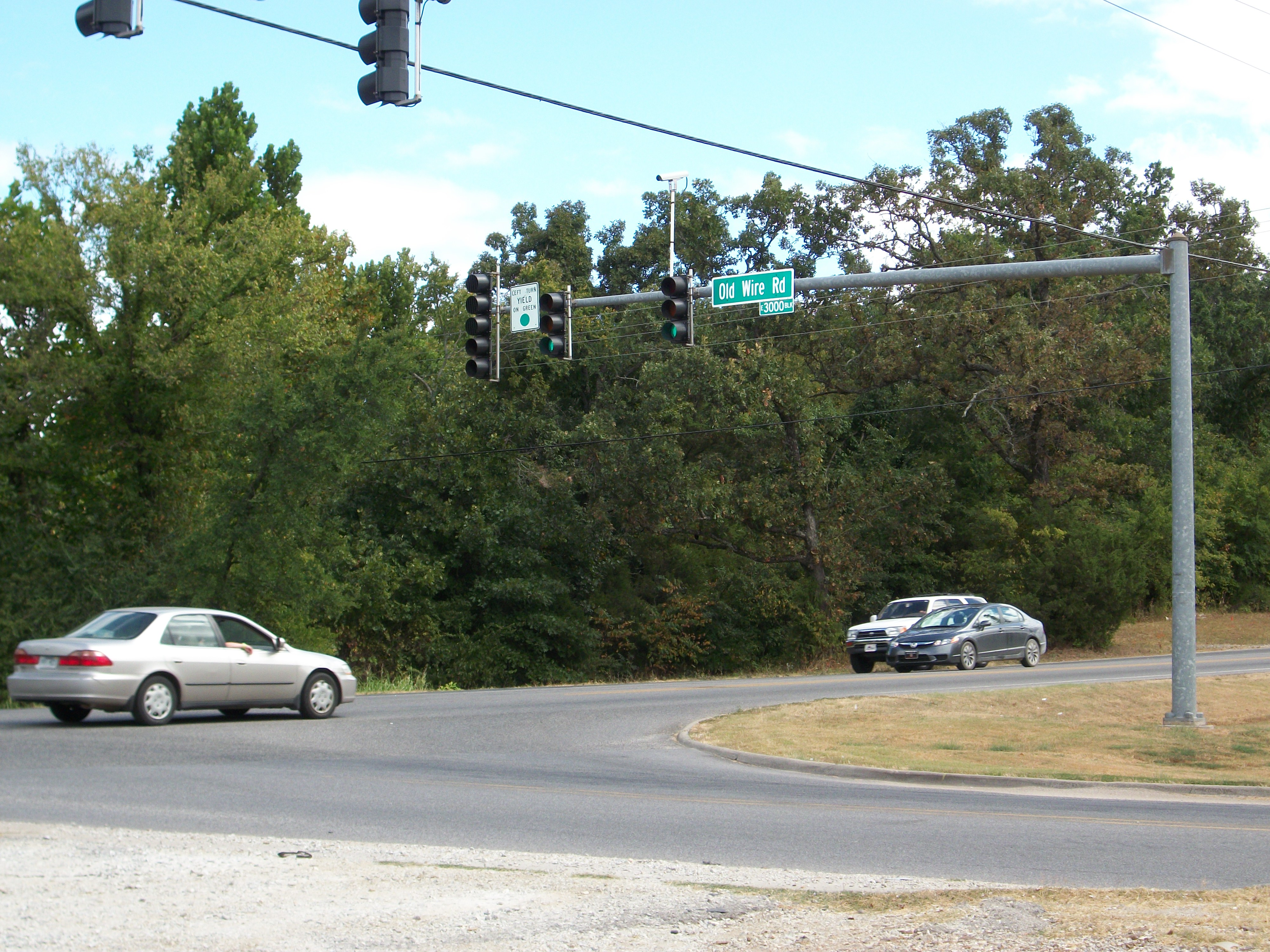
Old Wire Road intersects Highway 265 in Fayetteville.

Although not one of Arkansas' original state highways, the path that Highway 265 follows is one of the state's oldest. Originally a Native American trace named the Great Osage Trail, the route was first used as a Military Road from St. Louis to Fort Smith, and later as the Trail of Tears. The Butterfield Overland Mail Route was active from 1857 to 1861 on the route. The route carried U.S. mail, and also carried telegraph lines west. Portions of the route are named Old Wire Road (also Old Missouri Road in Fayetteville) paying homage to the route's past. Although not all parts of Highway 265 are the exact path followed by the stage coaches, nor are all parts of Old Wire Road separate of Highway 265. This comes from the fact that there were many different alignments of the historic routes. Although there is no doubt about the southern segment's accuracy, Highway 265 is known as Old Missouri Road (or Crossover Rd.) paralleled by Old Wire Road in Fayetteville, but it is not clear to the traveler which route is more historically accurate.

The Strickler to Fayetteville segment was designated in 1958. Another AR 265 was later designated as a connector between Highway 16 and Highway 45, with this route being extended to its current alignment in 1973. The northernmost segment was designated in 1973, and was most recently paved in 1990.

== Major intersections ==
County	Location	mi	km	Destinations	Notes
Washington	Valley Township	0.000	0.000	AR 170 – West Fork, Devil's Den State Park	Southern terminus
Washington	Hogeye	9.74	15.68	AR 156 east	AR 156 western terminus
Washington	Greenland	16.74	26.94	To I-49	Access via Wilson Street
Washington	Fayetteville	19.42	31.25	I-49 south – Fort Smith	Exit 60 on I-49; former I-540
Washington	Fayetteville	19.42	31.25	I-49 north / US 71 (South Fulbright Expressway) – Fayetteville, Springdale AR 16 east (Razorback Road) – Fayetteville	Northern terminus of southern segment; western terminus of AR 16; no access from US 71 south or I-49; I-49 exit 61, US 71 exit 60; US 71 south serves Drake Field
Washington	Fayetteville	Access between southern and central segments via AR 16			
Washington	Fayetteville	0.000	0.000	AR 16 (Huntsville Road) – Elkins, Fayetteville	Southern terminus of central segment
Washington	Fayetteville	2.39	3.85	AR 45 (Mission Boulevard) – Hindsville	
Washington	Springdale	8.00	12.87	US 412 (Robinson Avenue) – Huntsville	
Washington	Springdale	10.6	17.1	Randall Wobbe Lane west / Old Wire Road east	North end state maintenance
Washington–Benton county line	Springdale	11.1	17.9	South end state maintenance	
Benton	Springdale	12.2	19.6	AR 264	
Benton	Lowell	14.2	22.9	Nail Avenue	North end state maintenance
Benton	Township 1	14.7	23.7	Jennifer Lane (500 North)	South end state maintenance
Benton	Township 1	14.75	23.74	Cul-de-sac (516 North)	North end state maintenance
Benton	Rogers	18.210	29.306	AR 94 (New Hope Road)	ArDOT signs this as northern terminus of central segment
Benton	1.000 mi = 1.609 km; 1.000 km = 0.621 mi				

== Related routes ==
=== Springdale spur ===
Highway 265S
- Location: Springdale
- Length: 2.4 mi (3.9 km)
- Existed: 1990s

Highway 265 Spur was a spur route in Springdale. It was 2.4 miles (3.9 km) in length and was removed from the system in the 1990s, now named Butterfield Coach Road and Emma Avenue.

=== Highway 383 ===
Highway 383
- Location: Springdale
- Length: 2 mi (3.2 km)

Highway 383 was a 2-mile-long (3.2 km) north–south highway along Old Missouri Road in Springdale, Arkansas. Its southern terminus was Highway 68 (now known as U.S. Highway 412) with its northern terminus at Highway 68N (also known as Emma Avenue). It was used primarily as a local access road to nearby Parson's Arena.

In the 1980s, Highway 383 was redesignated as an extension of Highway 265.

== See also ==
- List of state highways in Arkansas
