= Old Wire Road =

Historic road in Missouri and Arkansas

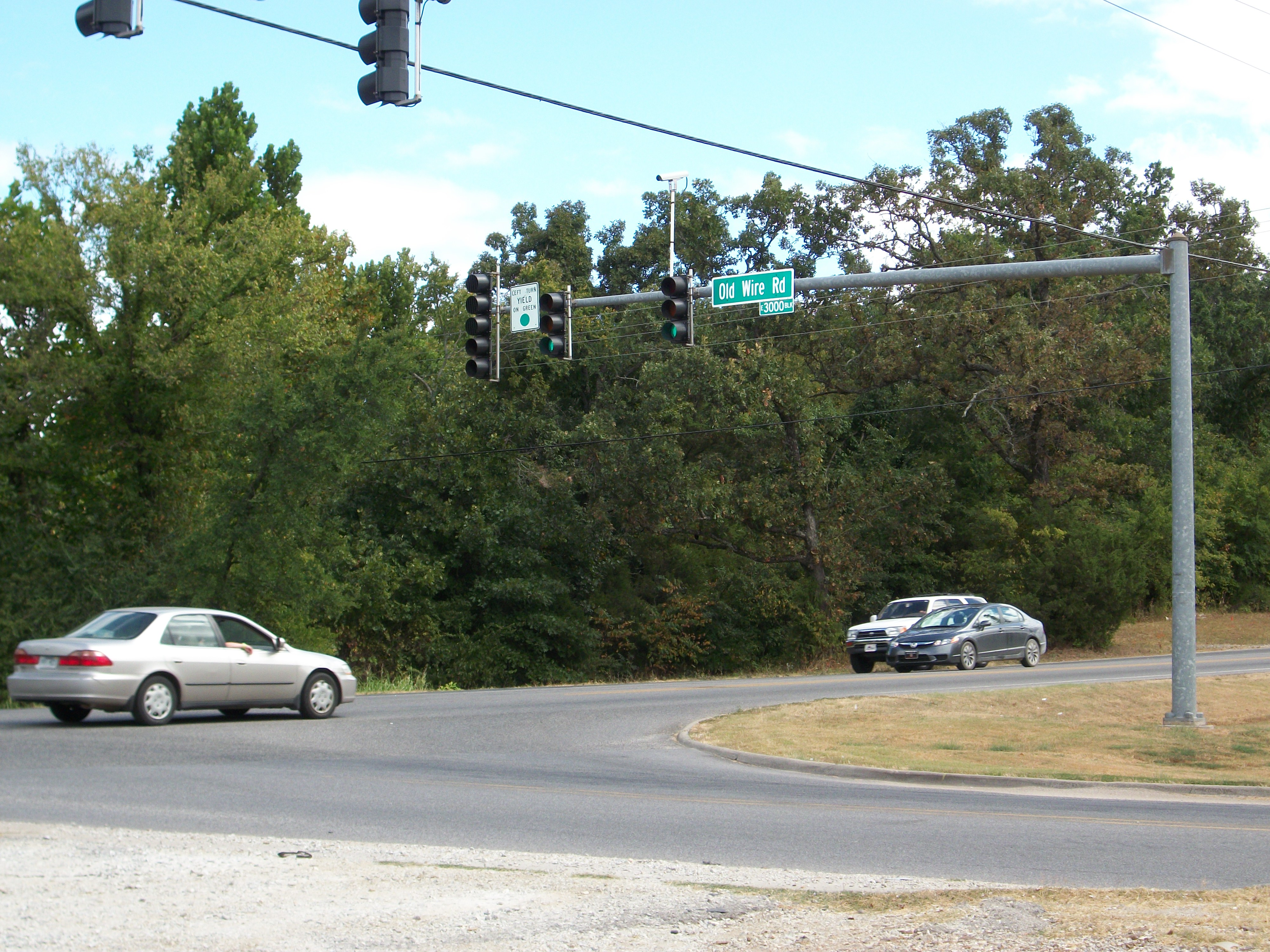
The 3000 block of Old Wire Road (Arkansas Highway 265) in Fayetteville, Arkansas

The Old Wire Road was a historic road in Missouri and Arkansas. Several local roads are still known by this name. It followed an old Native American route, the Great Osage Trail across the Ozarks, and later a telegraph line along this route from St. Louis, Missouri, to Fort Smith, Arkansas. This route was also used by the Butterfield Overland Mail. It was known simply as the "Wire Road" while the telegraph line was up, but when the line was later removed, it became known as the "Old Wire Road".

The road begins at Jefferson Barracks in St. Louis, where it is called Telegraph Road. From St. Louis to Springfield, Missouri, it was originally designated Route 14, which later became U.S. Route 66 and still later Interstate 44. At Springfield, the road turned southwest and passed through what is now Wilson's Creek National Battlefield. From there it meandered southwest through Christian and Stone counties in Missouri towards the Arkansas state line. It passed near Pea Ridge, Arkansas and through Fayetteville on its way to Fort Smith, Arkansas. The route was used for the Trail of Tears and during the Civil War, when Confederate soldiers often cut the telegraph line.

== History ==
The “Old Wire Road” is most often cited in southwest Missouri as the route later used by Route 66 (now I-44). The wire road got its name from the federal or military telegraph line built along the route in 1858. It followed the route of the Springfield–St. Louis road authorized by the state legislature on February 6, 1837. The road connected with the St. Louis–Jefferson City state road at Gray Summit. Hence traffic entered St. Louis on what is now Route 100, following Manchester Road.

The federal telegraph line turned south at Springfield following the Butterfield Overland Mail route to Fort Smith. County histories show the "Wire Road" name used further east in Pulaski and Crawford counties. In Crawford County the term "Springfield Road" was more common. No use of “Wire Road” was recorded in Franklin or St. Louis counties.

The telegraph was a significant new technology during the Civil War. President Lincoln spent much time in the telegraph office to follow battle results. U.S. Military Telegraph Corps crews followed battles. On July 1, 1864, the US had 4,955 miles of military telegraph. After the war, those telegraph lines were turned over to commercial companies. In Missouri, the wires were removed, leaving only the poles behind. One of the routes followed by these derelict telegraph poles became the Old Wire Road.

The route of the telegraph to St. Louis from Crawford County is unknown. Railroads often found telegraphs well-suited to their routes. The telegraph arrived in St. Louis from the east in 1847.

The Pacific Railroad began construction in St. Louis on July 4, 1851. A branch running to the southwest was authorized in 1852 and reached Cuba, Missouri in 1859, but did not reach Rolla until 1861. It branched from the main Pacific Railroad route between St. Louis and Jefferson City near Pacific, Missouri and from there followed the St. Louis–Springfield Road to Springfield.

The federal telegraph is said to have originated at Jefferson Barracks south of St. Louis, where a road known after 1850 as Telegraph Road followed Old King’s Trace or King’s Highway from Cape Girardeau through Perryville and Ste. Genevieve to St. Louis. It was part of the telegraph line to New Orleans. The line was completed to the St Louis Office on Main & Olive on March 6, 1850, and opened formally to Cape on March 20.

The federal telegraph line served St. Louis, Rolla, Lebanon, Marshfield, Springfield and Fort Scott. Springfield did not receive commercial telegraph until 1860 (from Jefferson City via Bolivar), long before the arrival of the railroad in 1870.

In 1850, a telegraph line was organized west from St. Louis to Jefferson City. An office was opened at Union, Missouri on December 29. The line opened to Jefferson City eight days later. The state legislature created a telegraph office in the state capitol. The line was extended to Boonville on February 7, 1851, and reached St. Joseph in October by way of Arrow Rock, Marshall, Lexington, Independence, Brunswick, Liberty, and Weston. It was incorporated as the St Louis and Missouri River Telegraph Company on March 3, 1851. The wire was strung on trees with attached glass insulators. Service was unreliable due to poor maintenance. In 1856, the Pacific Railroad agreed to build and maintain the telegraph from St. Louis to Jefferson City. Construction began in January 1857. The line re-opened January 30 and was extended to Boonville.

Parts of the federal telegraph line may have followed the railroad which was under construction at the time. After Confederate General Sterling Price attacked Franklin (now Pacific, Missouri) from Potosi in October 1864, the federal line to Rolla had to be repaired, which implies the federal line followed the railroad.

Another wire road connected Kansas City and Fort Leavenworth with Fort Smith. The military telegraph ran from Kansas City to Fort Scott via Westport, Olathe, Paola, and Mound City. A branch from Olathe reached Fort Leavenworth using poles from Lawrence. St. Joseph also had a military telegraph line during the war, but it closed in August 1865.

Captain RC Clowry, Assistant Quartermaster, was superintendent of the Military Telegraph in Missouri. He operated close to 1,700 miles of telegraph with 300 to 500 men. He was promoted to major in 1865.

In 1865, federal telegraph lines in the Missouri District (including Kansas and Arkansas) and their mileage were listed as:

St. Louis to Ft Scott, 403
Allen (near Moberly) via Boonville and Weston to St. Joseph, 296
St. Louis to New Madrid, 206 St. Louis to Macon, 168 Little Rock to White River mouth, 152 Fort Leavenworth to Fort Scott, 120(?) Bloomfield to Cape Girardeau, 45 Little Rock to Pine Bluff, 45 Jefferson City to Syracuse, 43 Pilot Knob to Patterson, 28 St. Louis City lines, 10

Before highways were identified by number, routes were named and marked by symbols painted on telephone poles. In 1917, the Springfield–St. Louis Road became known as the Ozark Trail. Its symbol was an orange band with a black circle in the middle and the letters OT on the circle.

Newspapers published a few news items from the federal telegraph line. The St. Joseph Weekly Herald Thur Oct 30, 1862. Telegraph from commander at Lebanon. About 150 rebels crossed Springfield Rd abt 20 mi west of Lebanon yesterday at 4 pm. Maybe at least 500 men. 1/4 to ½ armed.

== Gateway to the West ==
In the early days Missouri was Gateway to the West. Western trails to Santa Fe, Oregon, California and Texas originated at Missouri’s western border. They were reached using Boone's Lick Road, Missouri's extension of the National Road. The Pony Express began at St. Joseph, Missouri. Boosters like Senator Thomas Hart Benton thought the Transcontinental Railroad should run from Missouri. Extension of the Southwestern branch of the Pacific Railroad through Indian Territory would have avoided keeping mountain passes open in winter.

The Pacific Telegraph Act of 1860 authorized the construction of the Transcontinental Telegraph. Initially the line was to follow the route of the Pony Express from Missouri to California. That changed due to slavery. Missouri’s Governor Claiborne Fox Jackson ordered telegraph lines in Missouri torn down on June 15, 1861, to prevent their use by the Union. Omaha was chosen as the alternative. The Transcontinental Railroad followed the same route favoring Chicago over St. Louis.
