= Arkansas Scenic Byways =

Scenic highway system

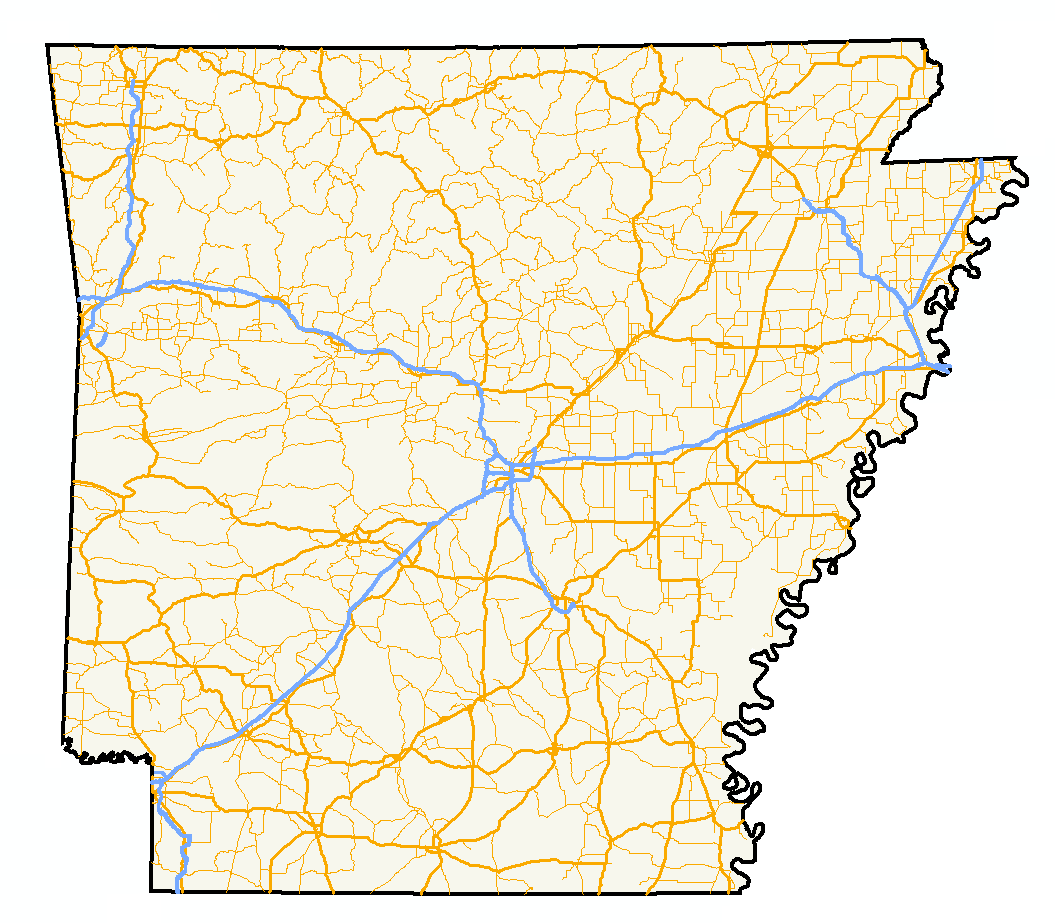
- A map of highways in the state of Arkansas

System information
- Formed: 1991

Highway names
- Interstates: Interstate nn, Highway nn (I nn)
- US Highways: US Highway nn, US Route nn (US nn)
- State: Highway nn, Arkansas nn (AR nn or Hwy. nn)

System links
- Arkansas Highway System; Interstate; US; State; Business; Spurs; Suffixed; Scenic; Heritage

The Arkansas Scenic Byways Program is a list of highways, mainly state highways, that have been designated by the Arkansas Department of Transportation (ArDOT) as scenic highways. The Arkansas General Assembly designates routes for scenic byway status upon successful nomination. For a highway to be declared scenic, a group interested in preserving the scenic, cultural, recreational, and historic qualities of the route must be created. Mayors of all communities along the route and county judges from each affected county must be included in the organization. Scenic highways are marked with a circular shield in addition to regular route markers.

There are currently 11 scenic routes that have been designated Arkansas state scenic byways. Three of these byways are also National Scenic Byways.

== National scenic byways ==
Name	Image	Description	mi	km	References
Crowley's Ridge Parkway		Scenic views along Crowley's Ridge, a geological feature rising from the Arkansas Delta creating a different habitat for plant and animal life, including the St. Francis National Forest, and more hospitable spot for early settlement. The Parkway passes through most of the larger towns of the region, with accompanying cultural and historical sites.	212.0	341.2	
Great River Road					
Talimena Scenic Drive					

== State byways ==
- Scenic Highway 7
- Boston Mountains Scenic Loop
- Interstate 530 Scenic Byway
- Mount Magazine Scenic Byway
- Ozark Highlands Scenic Byway
- Pig Trail Scenic Byway
- Sylamore Scenic Byway
- West–Northwest Scenic Byway

== Gallery ==
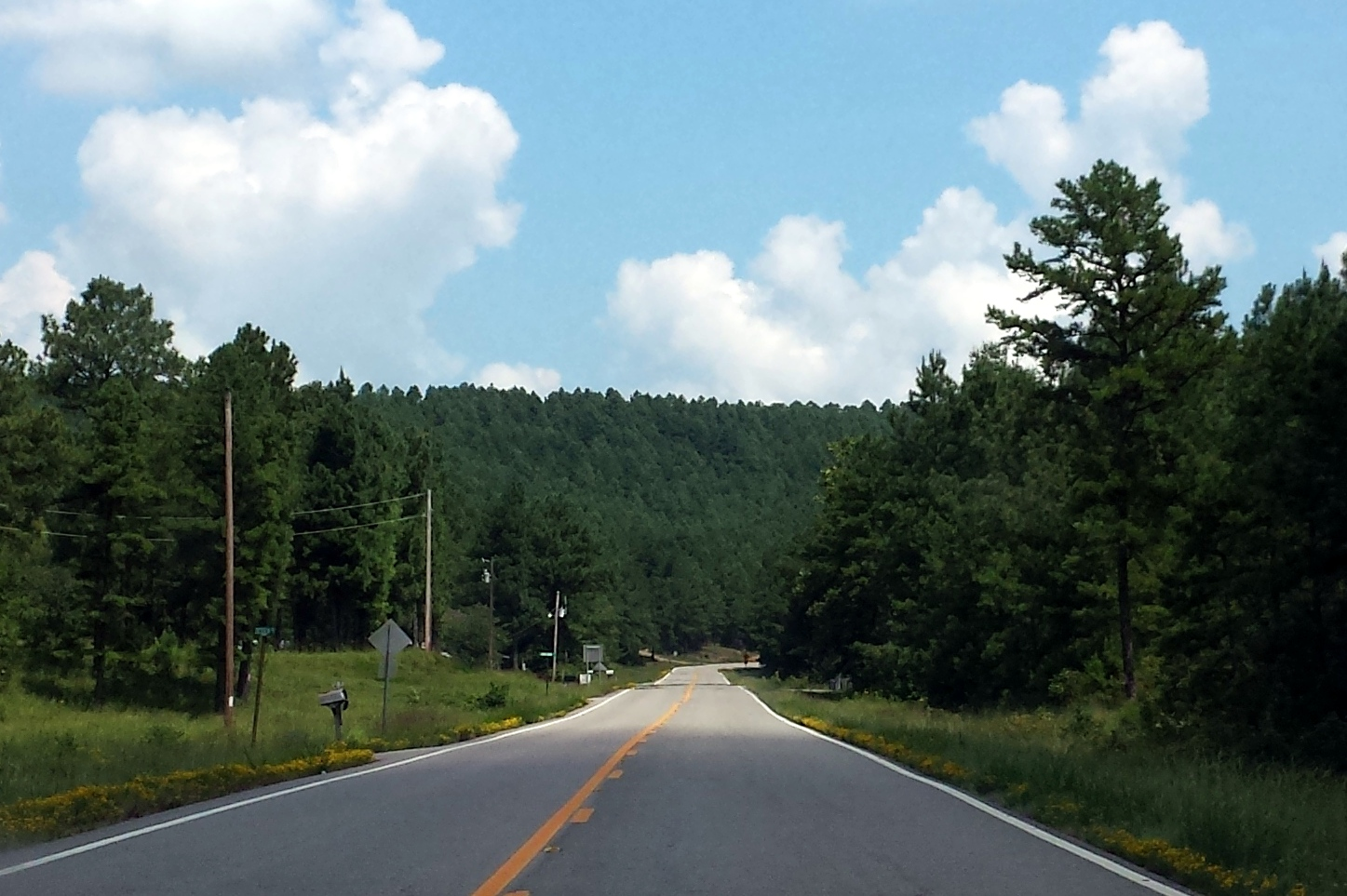
Highway 7 in the Ouachita Mountains

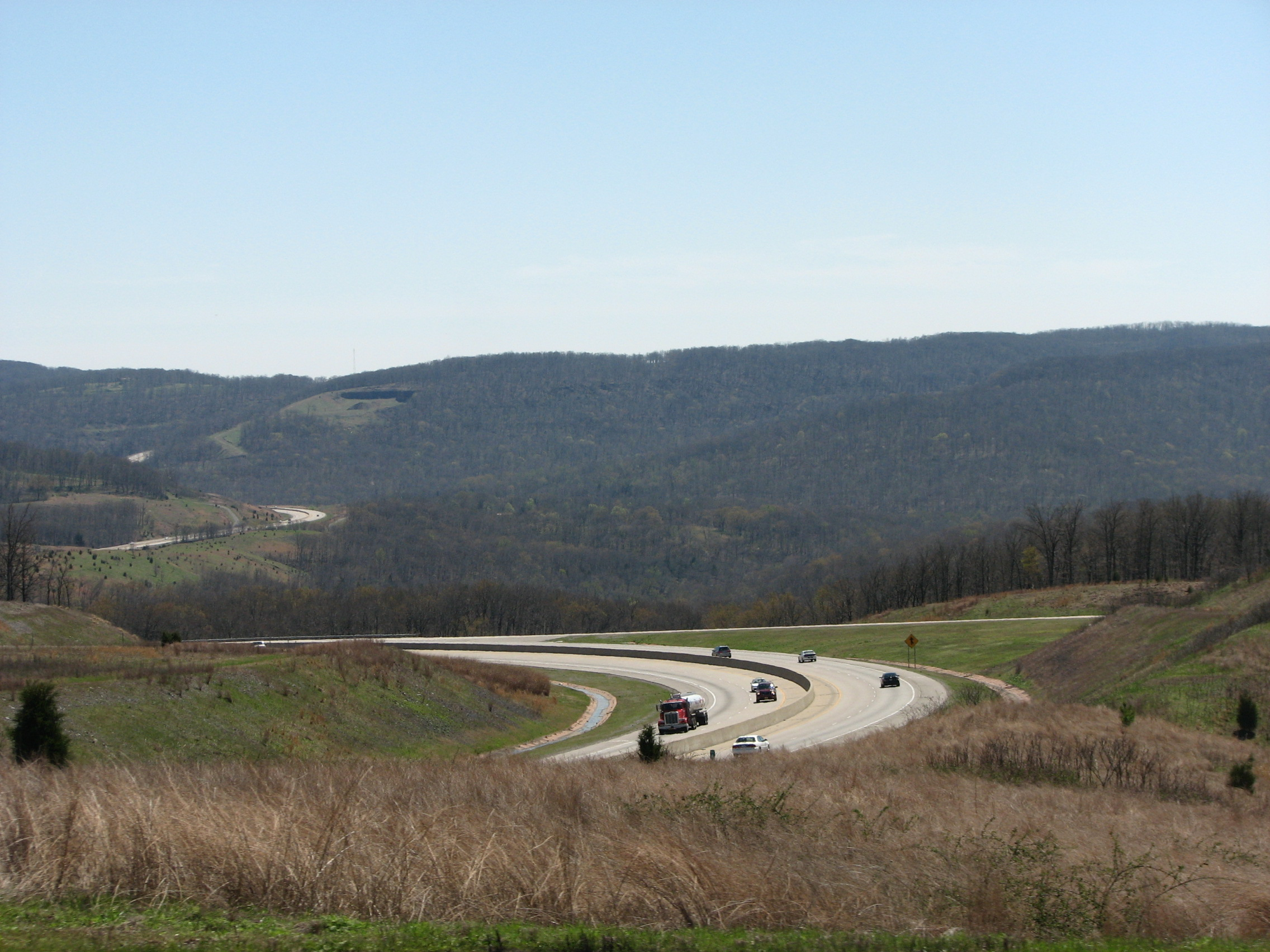
Interstate 49 winds through the Boston Mountains near Winslow as part of the Boston Mountains Scenic Loop

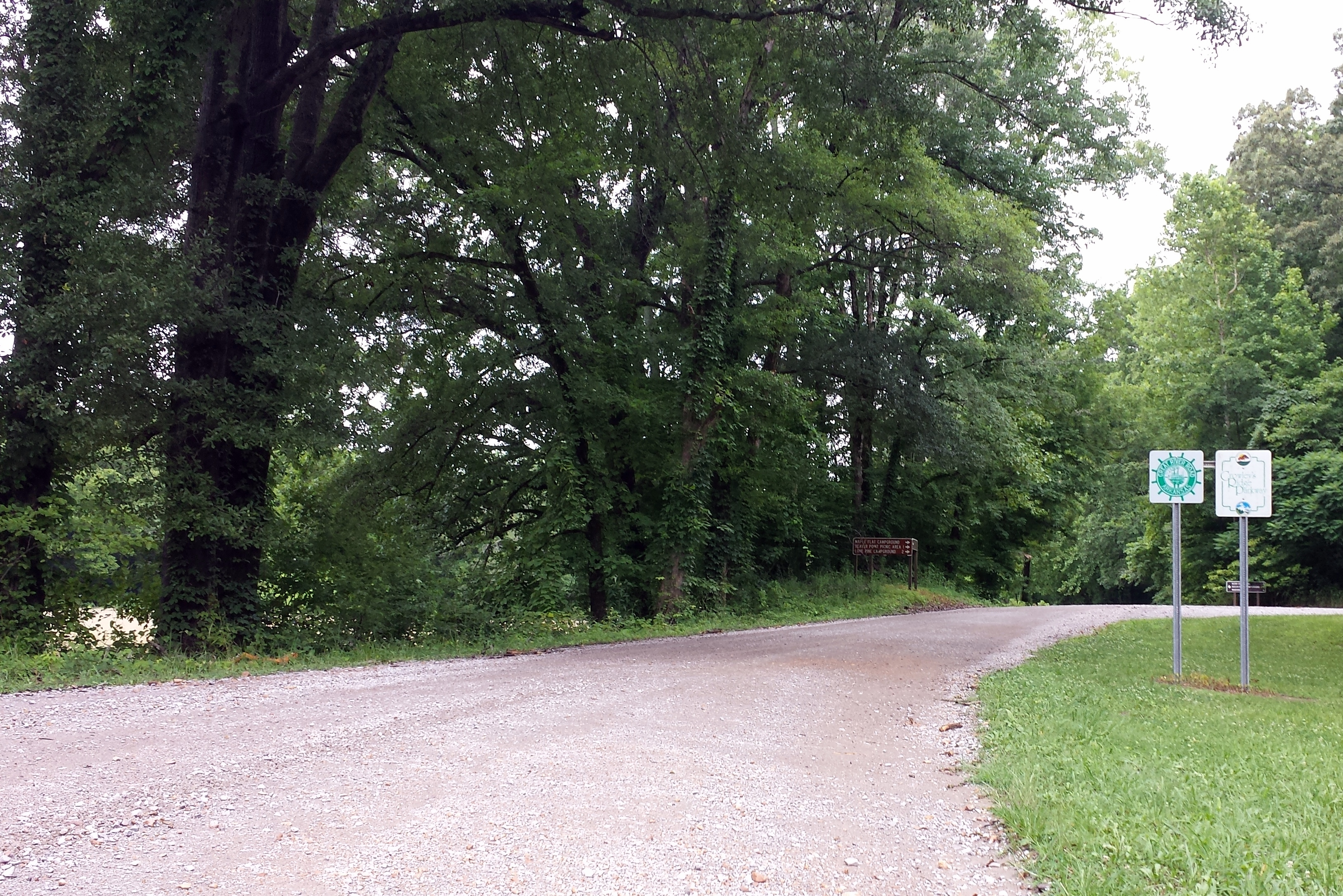
Crowley's Ridge Parkway and the Great River Road run together in Mississippi River State Park

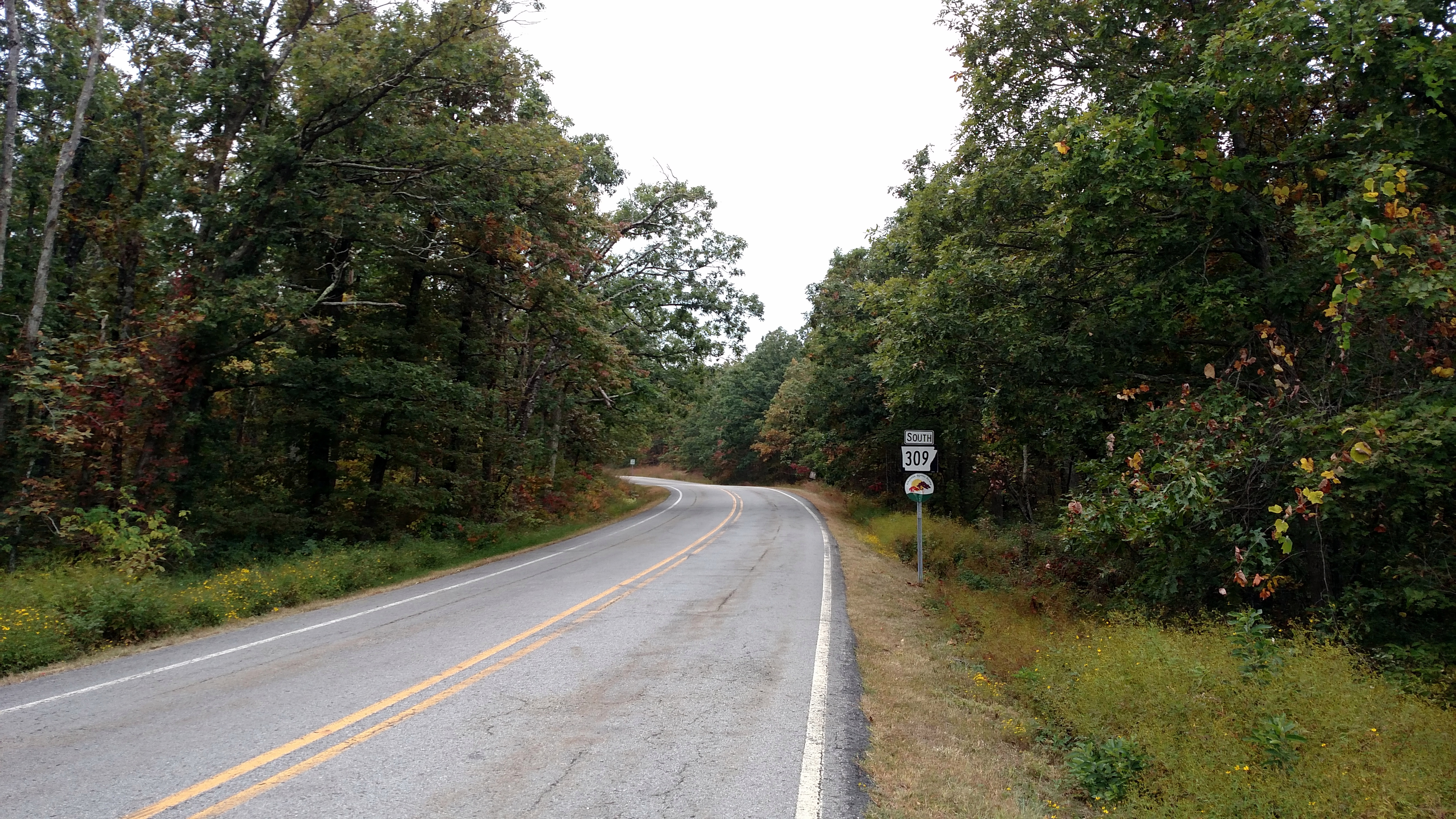
Mt. Magazine Scenic Byway

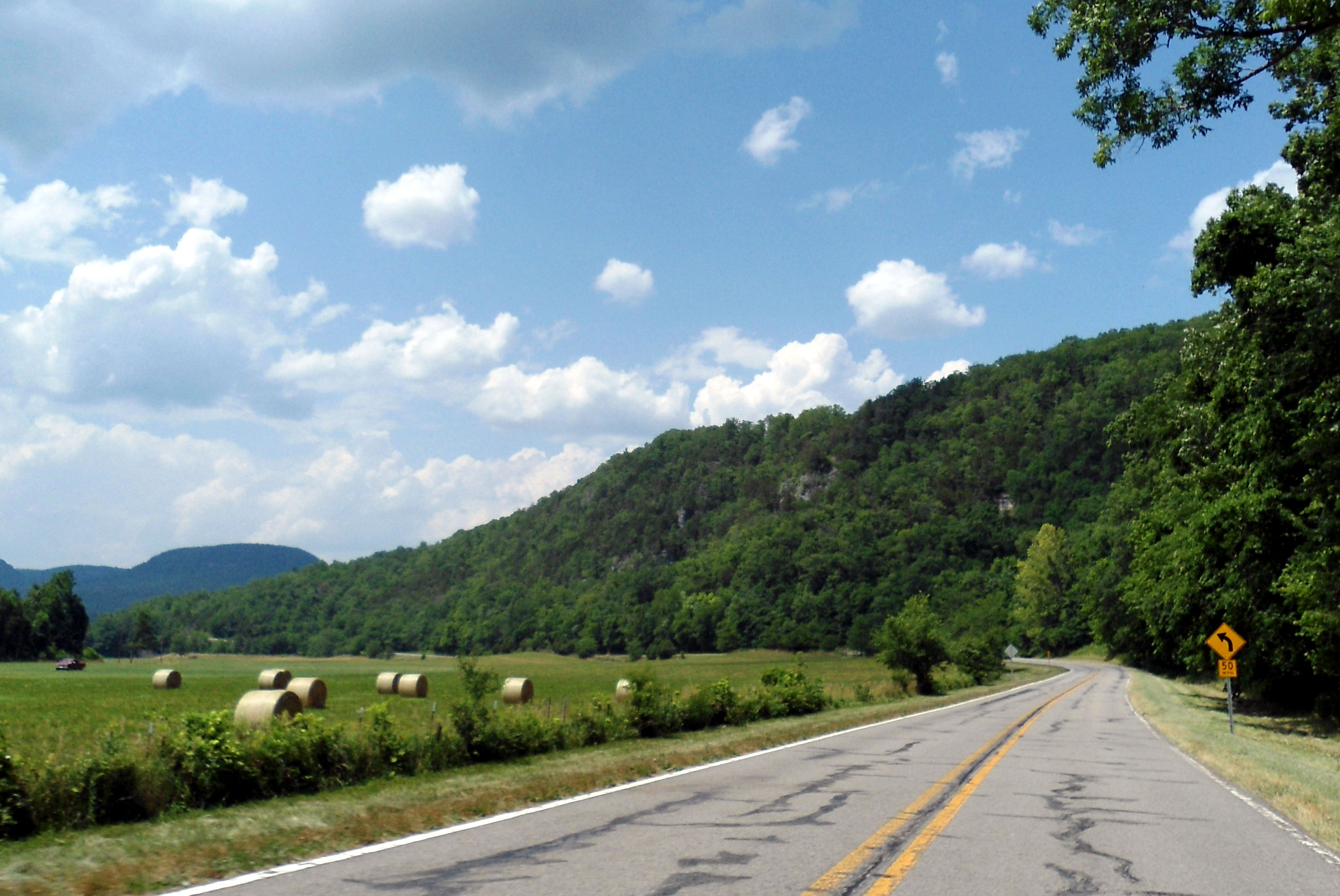
Ozark Highlands Scenic Byway in Boxley Valley

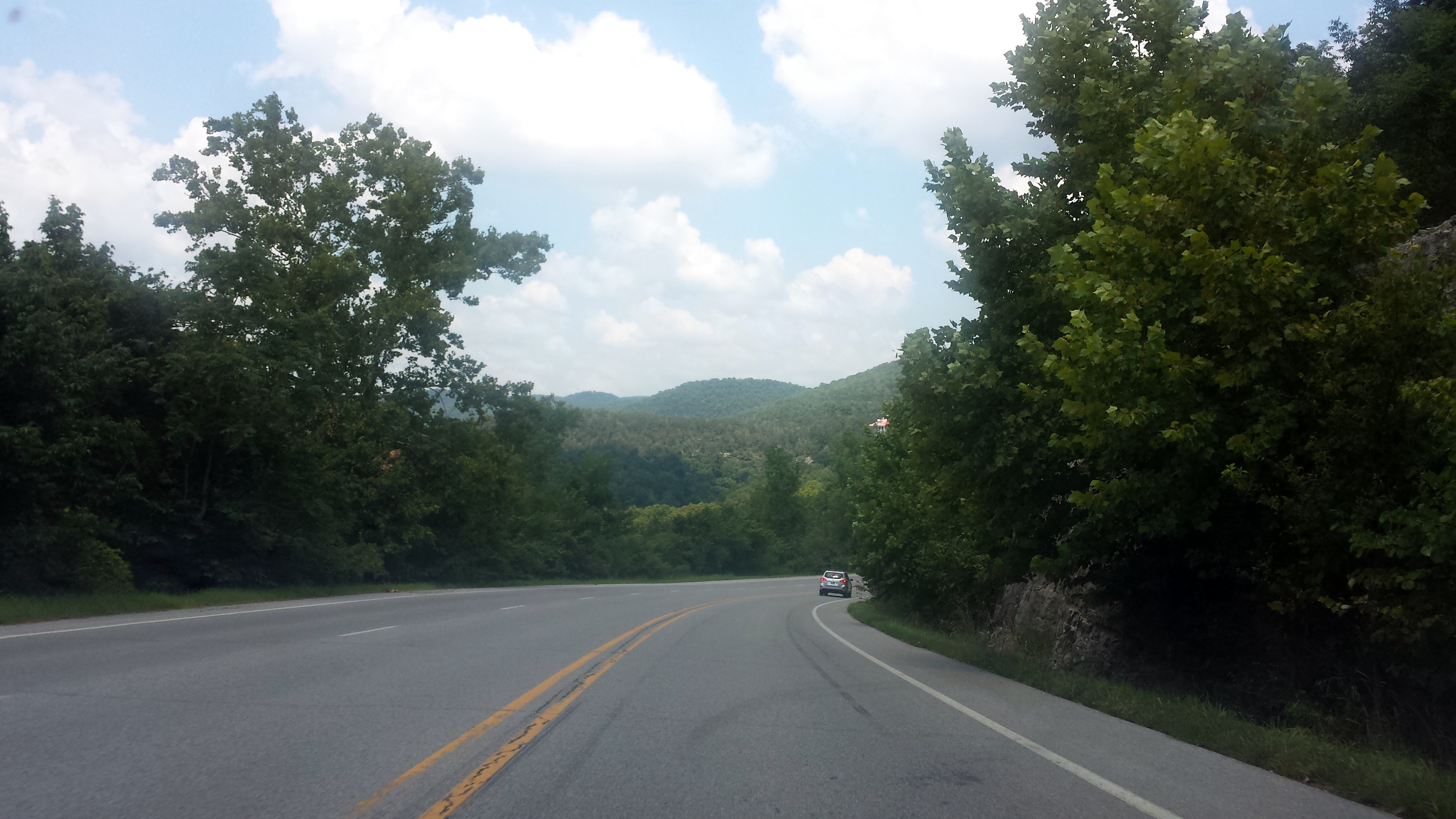
Sylamore Scenic Byway near Mountain View

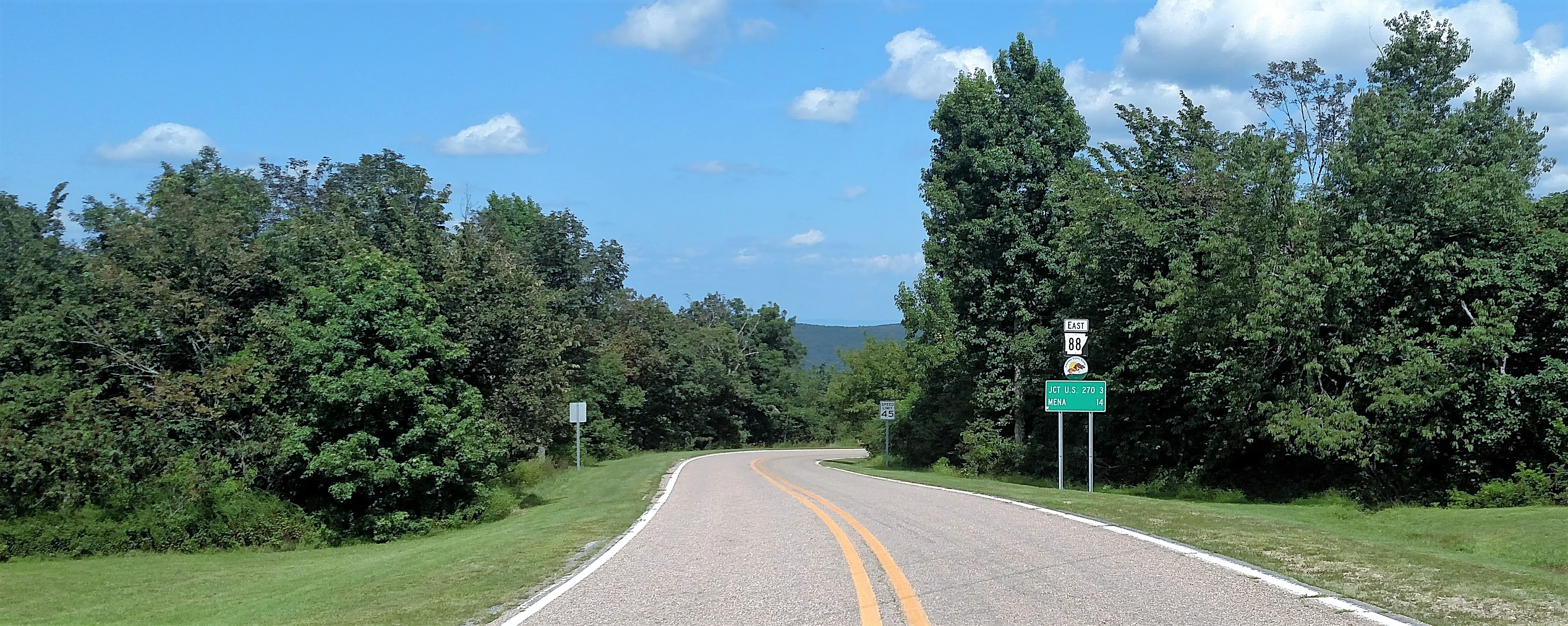
Talimena Scenic Drive in Queen Wilhelmina State Park
