= Devil's Den State Park =

State park in Washington County, Arkansas, United States

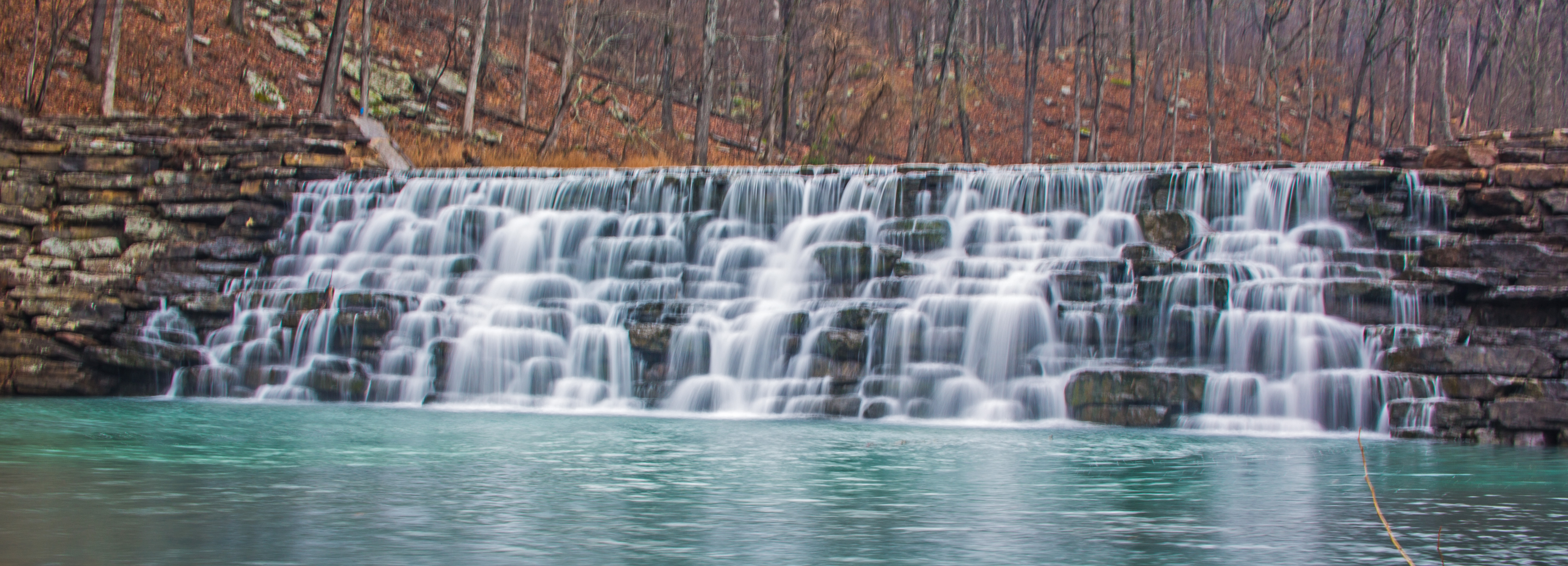

- Location within Arkansas Location within the United States
- Interactive map of Devil's Den State Park
- Location: Washington County, Arkansas, United States
- Coordinates: 35°46′48″N 94°15′00″W
- Area: 2,200 acres (890 ha)
- Elevation: 1,020 ft (310 m)
- Established: October 13, 1933
- Administrator: Arkansas Department of Parks, Heritage and Tourism
- Website: Official website
- Arkansas State Parks

Devil's Den State Park is a 2,200-acre (890 ha) Arkansas state park in Washington County, near West Fork, Arkansas in the United States. Park amenities were built by the Civilian Conservation Corps, beginning in 1933. Devil's Den State Park is in the Lee Creek Valley in the Boston Mountains, which are the southwestern part of The Ozarks. The park, with an 8 acres (3.2 ha) CCC-built lake, is open for year-round recreation, with trails for hiking, mountain biking and horseback riding. Devil's Den State Park also has several picnic areas, a swimming pool and cabins, with camping sites ranging from modern to primitive. Fossils of coral and crinoids can be found along the banks and within Lee Creek at Devil's Den State Park.

== History ==
Devil's Den State Park, in the Lee Creek Valley, protects the largest sandstone crevice area in the United States. The valley is littered with numerous sandstone caves, bluffs, ravines, rock shelters and crevices that provided an excellent hiding place for outlaws on the Butterfield Stage Line, from 1858 until the beginning of the American Civil War in 1861. With the onset of the war, the rocky area was used by bands of Confederate guerillas as a hideout and staging area for conducting raids on the Union Army's supply lines as well as civilian targets. The roads of the Butterfield State Line were also used by regular troops during the Civil War. Confederate and Union forces used the road during the Battle of Prairie Grove and for the Raid on Van Buren. The former town of Anna is contained within the park. It was destroyed by a flood in 1893. All that remains of the town is a cemetery, a well, and some foundations. The remnants of Anna can be seen along the Butterfield Hiking Trail near Junction Camp.

Lee Creek Valley was identified during the Great Depression as a site for a state park. Construction on the park began in 1933. Devil's Den State Park was built by young men working for the Civilian Conservation Corps, which was established during the presidency of Franklin D. Roosevelt to provide work for unemployed men throughout the United States. The young men of the CCC lived in military-style barracks and constructed many of the recreational facilities at the park, including pavilions, trails and the dam and spillway on Lee Creek that forms Lake Devil. The park underwent an extensive renovation in the 1970s when the CCC-built structures were refurbished. Devil's Den State Park is recognized as one of the best preserved CCC projects in the United States. It was listed on the National Register of Historic Places in 1994 for its CCC-related Rustic architecture.

== Geology ==
Devil's Den State Park is in the Lee Creek Valley of the Boston Mountains, which are part of The Ozarks. The area is a high and deeply dissected plateau in northern Arkansas and eastern Oklahoma. The rocks of the region are essentially little disturbed, flat-lying sedimentary layers of the Paleozoic age. The highest ridges and peaks are capped by Pennsylvanian sandstone and shale. The deeply eroded valleys are cut into Mississippian limestones, and below that layer, Ordovician dolomites.

The caves, ravines and crevices were partly formed by slippage in sandstone formations. The Devil's Ice Box, one of the most visited caves in the park, is named for the cool air that rushes out of the cave. Air enters the cave at a point higher on the mountainside and is cooled as it passes through the mountain to the mouth of the cave.

== Recreation ==
=== Cabins and camping ===
The park features 17 full-service cabins and 143 camp sites. The cabins are along Lee Creek. All are "rustic", with fully equipped kitchens plus heating and air-conditioning. The cabins, with stone fireplaces, are open year-round. Devil's Den State Park is home to 146 campsites of various type. Many have electric hookups and running water; others are little more than a cleared and level patch of ground on which to set up a tent.

=== Trails ===
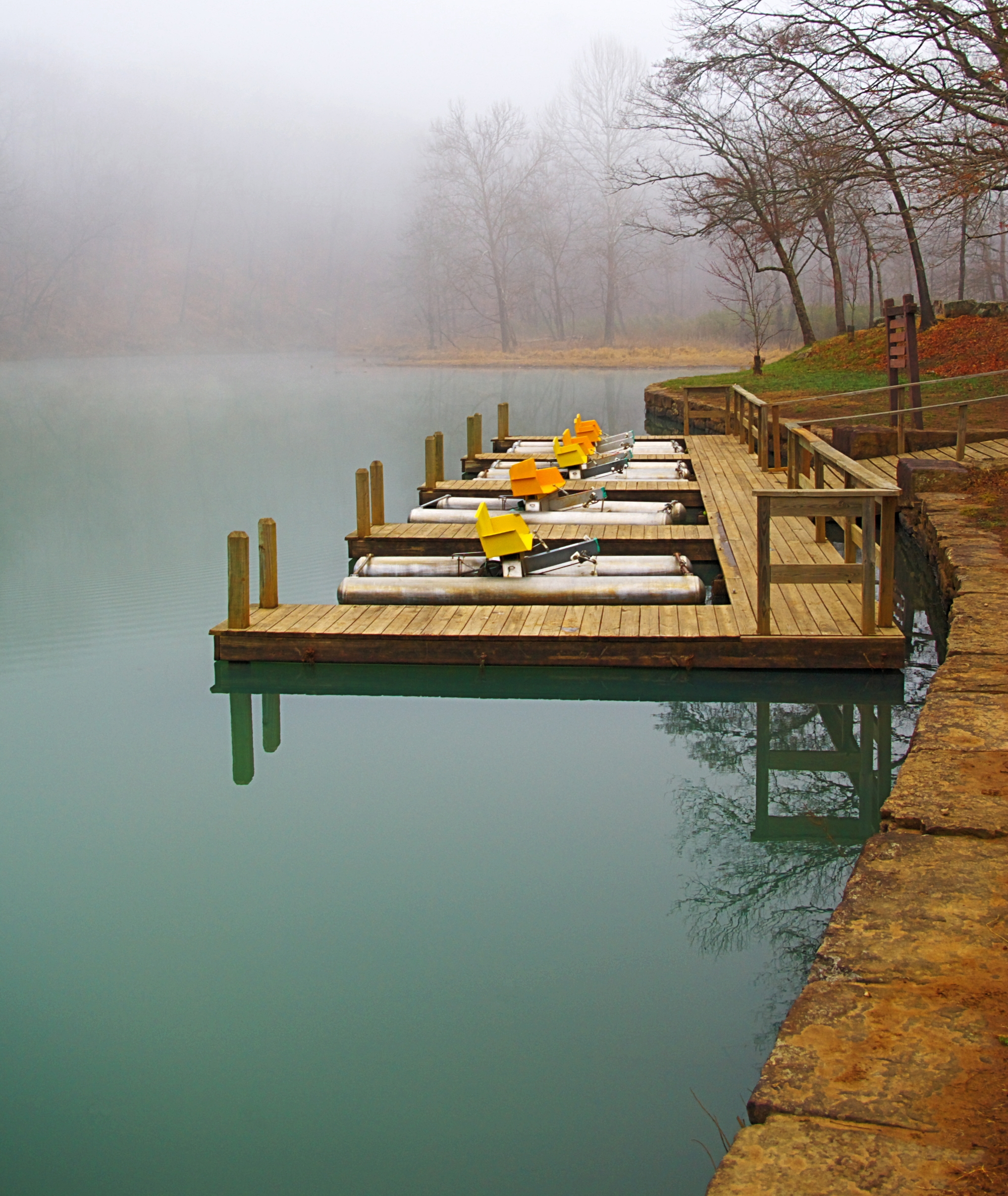
Pedal boat dock on Lake Devil

Devil's Den State Park is home to approximately 64 miles (103 km) of trails that are open to hiking, mountain biking and horseback riding, with 20 miles (32 km) of trails that are designated horse trails. Each horse trail begins and ends at the Devil's Den State Park horse camp on the southern end of the camp in the Lee Creek Valley. Two of the trails cross into neighboring Ozark National Forest.

- Old Road Trail is 4.5 miles (7.2 km) long. It is named for the old dirt Arkansas Highway 170 that was built by the Civilian Conservation Corps. It is the only trail contained entirely within Devil's Den State Park. Old Road was the main road through Lee Creek Valley. Near the head of the trail, it passes by discarded car parts from the earliest days of the automobile. Throughout the course of the trail, it passes through a cedar grove, runs parallel, in places to Arkansas Highway 170 and then passes nearby the Yellow Rock Bluff overlook. Horses must be tied at a hitching post before visitors walk to the overlook. Old Road Trail continues to wind through the park and passes by the CCC overlook.

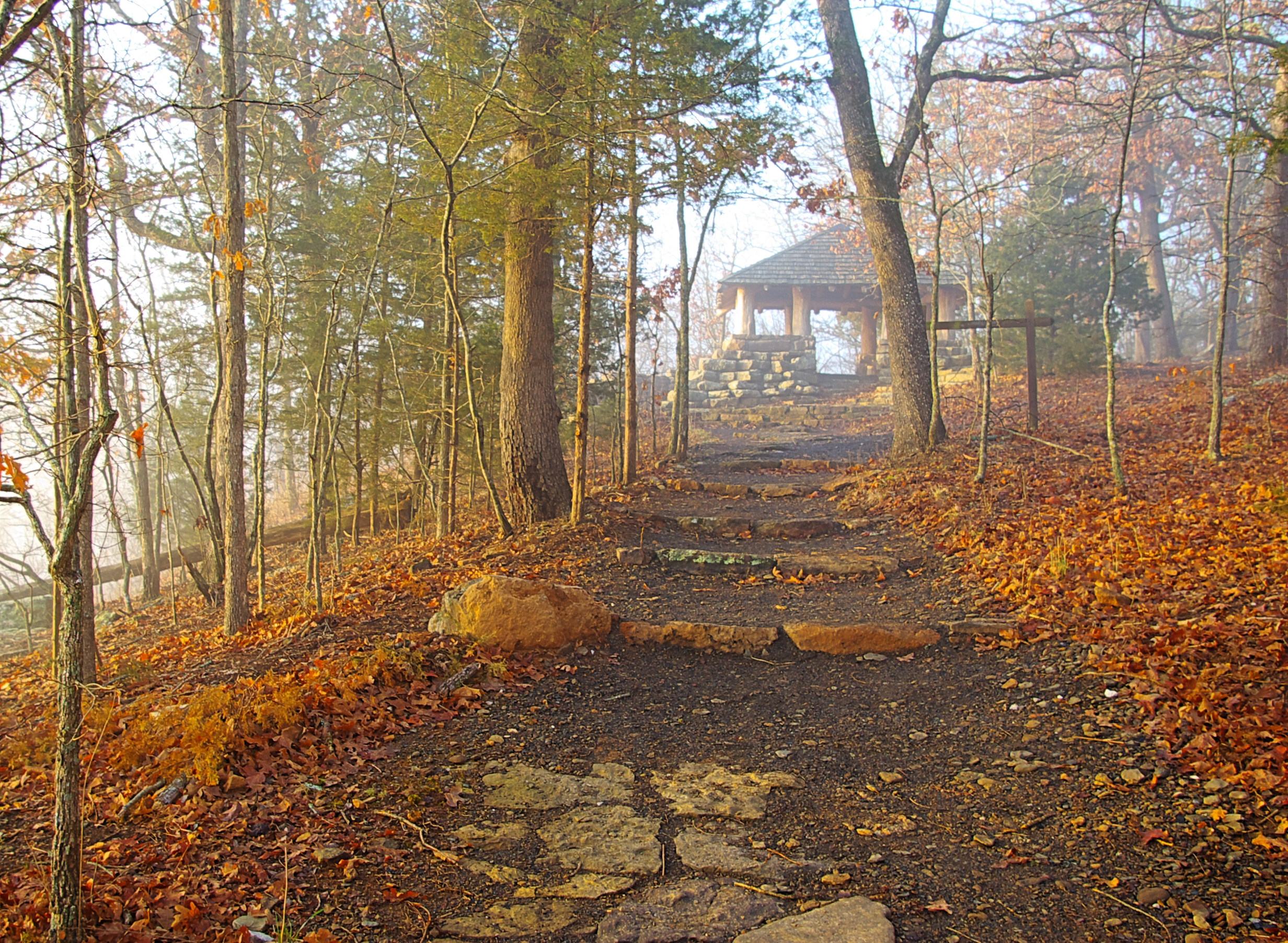
The CCC overlook

- Gorley King Trail is 7 miles (11 km) long. It is named for Gorely King of Elkins, Arkansas. Gorley rode the trails at Devil's Den and outer areas during the 1970s, until the early 90s. Gorley, along with good friend Clifford Earl, helped to cut and maintain many of the trails in the outer forestry area. Both were trailbosses of the NorthWest Arkansas Calvalcade and helped establish the horse park as well as being advisors to the Arkansas Trails Co. The Gorley King trail was not only a trail Gorley made for the park but was also the last trail that he rode the day previous to his passing. Gorley was in his 90s. The trail begins on the eastern end of the horse camp and heads down Lee Creek Valley, where it joins the Butterfield Hiking Trail and Vista Point Trail. The trails climb the valley and rise above Lee Creek. Gorley King Trail then follows Holt Ridge into Ozark National Forest before returning to the park along an old logging road into the Lee Creek Valley.
- Vista Point Trail is 9 miles (14 km) long. It follows Gorley King Trail for 1.5 miles (2.4 km). Then it ascends Holt Ridge and heads out onto the plateau in Ozark National Forest. Here it passes a quarry that was used by the CCC to build some of the facilities at Devil's Den State Park. Next it ascends Mount Olive and crosses the Butterfield Hiking Trail. Vista Point Trail loops back through the national forest and towards the park, passing a 19th-century homestead and the Vista Point Overlook before returning to the park following part of the Gorley King Trail back to the horse camp.
- Butterfield Hiking Trail is 15 miles (24 km) long. The loop trail is marked with blue blazes. It begins and ends in Devil's Den State Park and passes through Ozark National Forest in Washington and Crawford County before returning to the park. Butterfield Hiking Trail is named for the Butterfield Stage Line that passed through Arkansas, a stagecoach route in the United States that operated from 1857 to 1861. It was a route for the United States mail from two eastern termini, Memphis, Tennessee, and St. Louis, Missouri, meeting at Fort Smith, Arkansas, and continuing through Indian Territory, Texas, New Mexico, and Arizona, ending in San Francisco, California. A writer for the New York Herald, Waterman L. Ornsby, described the Butterfield trail as it passed through the Boston Mountains. He said, "It is impossible that any road could be worse. I might say the road was steep, rugged, jagged, rough and mountainous and then wish for more impressive words."
- CCC Interpretive Trail is just 0.25 miles (0.40 km) long. It is a self-guided trail that passes through the Civilian Conservation Corps camp. There are trail side exhibits that explain the history of the CCC at Devil's Den State Park.
- Cross Country Mountain Bike Trail is 15 miles (24 km) long. It features creek crossings, dirt roads, single track riding and long uphills and downhills. It is divided into three loops and runs outside the park into Ozark National Forest. Riders are required to carry a permit from the park offices to ride the trail.
- Devil's Den Self-Guided Trail is a National Recreation Trail. It is 1.5 miles (2.4 km) long. It passes by two of the most popular attractions at the park: Devil's Den and the Devil's Icebox. It also features erosional remnants of sandstone strata, wet weather waterfalls and a variety of plant and animal life.
- Yellow Rock Trail is 3 miles (4.8 km) long. Users will hike 300 feet (91 m) in elevation to one of the best views in the park. Atop the Yellow Rock is an unobstructed view of the Lee Creek valley. Along the rest of the trail users enjoy cedar glades, interesting rock formations, and the first structure built in the park.
- Fossil Flats is a 3-5 mile (4.8-8 km) mountain bike or day hike trail. The flat exposed rock in the creek bed lends this trail its name. Many fossils are visible in the exposed creek bed. Along the trail you will see evidence of the CCC and early settlers, creek views, and big rock formations. This trail gives riders a choice of a 2.4, 4.2, or 6 mile rides and the difficulty increases with each mile added.

== Closure of Caves ==
Due to the spread of White Nose Syndrome, a fungal infection caused by the Geomyces destructans fungus in bats, including the Ozark big-eared bat, Indiana bat, and gray myotis (Arkansas’ three endangered bats), as well as the brown bat and tri-colored bat, the park's caves have been temporarily closed to the public since April 16, 2010, to help slow its spread.

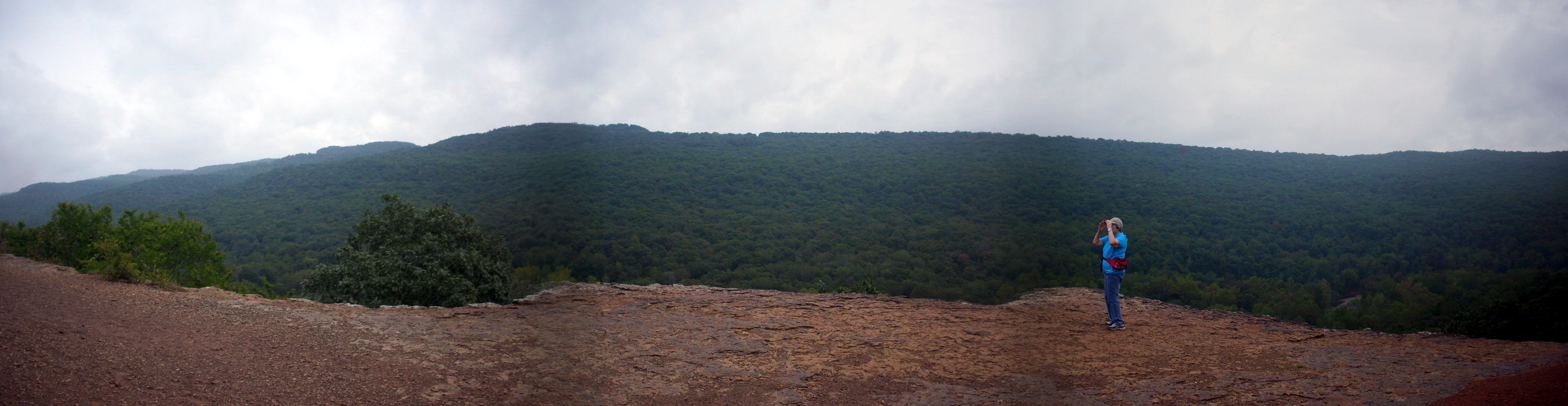
Devil's Den State Park from Yellow Rock

== See also ==
- National Register of Historic Places listings in Washington County, Arkansas
