= University of Arkansas =

Public university in Fayetteville, Arkansas, US

- Former name: Arkansas Industrial University (1871–1899)
- Motto: Veritate duce progredi (Latin)
- Motto in English: "To Advance with Truth as our Leader"
- Type: Public land-grant research university
- Established: March 27, 1871; 155 years ago
- Parent institution: University of Arkansas System
- Accreditation: HLC
- Academic affiliations: ORAU; space-grant
- Endowment: $1.81 billion (2025)
- Chancellor: Charles Robinson
- Provost: Terry Martin
- Academic staff: 1,490
- Administrative staff: 3,350
- Students: 34,174 (fall 2025)
- Undergraduates: 29,260
- Postgraduates: 4,915
- Location: Fayetteville, Arkansas, United States; 36°04′07″N 94°10′34″W
- Campus: 412 acres (1.67 km^{2}); Small city
- Newspaper: The Arkansas Traveler
- Colors: Cardinal and white
- Nickname: Razorbacks
- Sporting affiliations: NCAA Division I FBS – SEC
- Mascots: Sue E.; Tusk; Big Red
- Website: uark.edu

The University of Arkansas (U of A, UArk, or UA) is a public land-grant research university in Fayetteville, Arkansas, United States. It is the flagship campus of the University of Arkansas System. Founded as Arkansas Industrial University in 1871, classes were first held in 1872, with its present name adopted in 1899.

The university campus consists of 378 buildings spread across 512 acres (2.07 km^{2}) of land in Fayetteville, Arkansas. As of the fall of 2025, total enrollment was 34,175. The university is classified among "R1: Doctoral Universities – Very high research activity" and had spent $164.4 million on research in FY 2021.

The University of Arkansas's athletic teams, the Arkansas Razorbacks, compete in NCAA Division I as members of the Southeastern Conference (SEC) with eight men's teams and eleven women's teams in thirteen sports.

== History ==
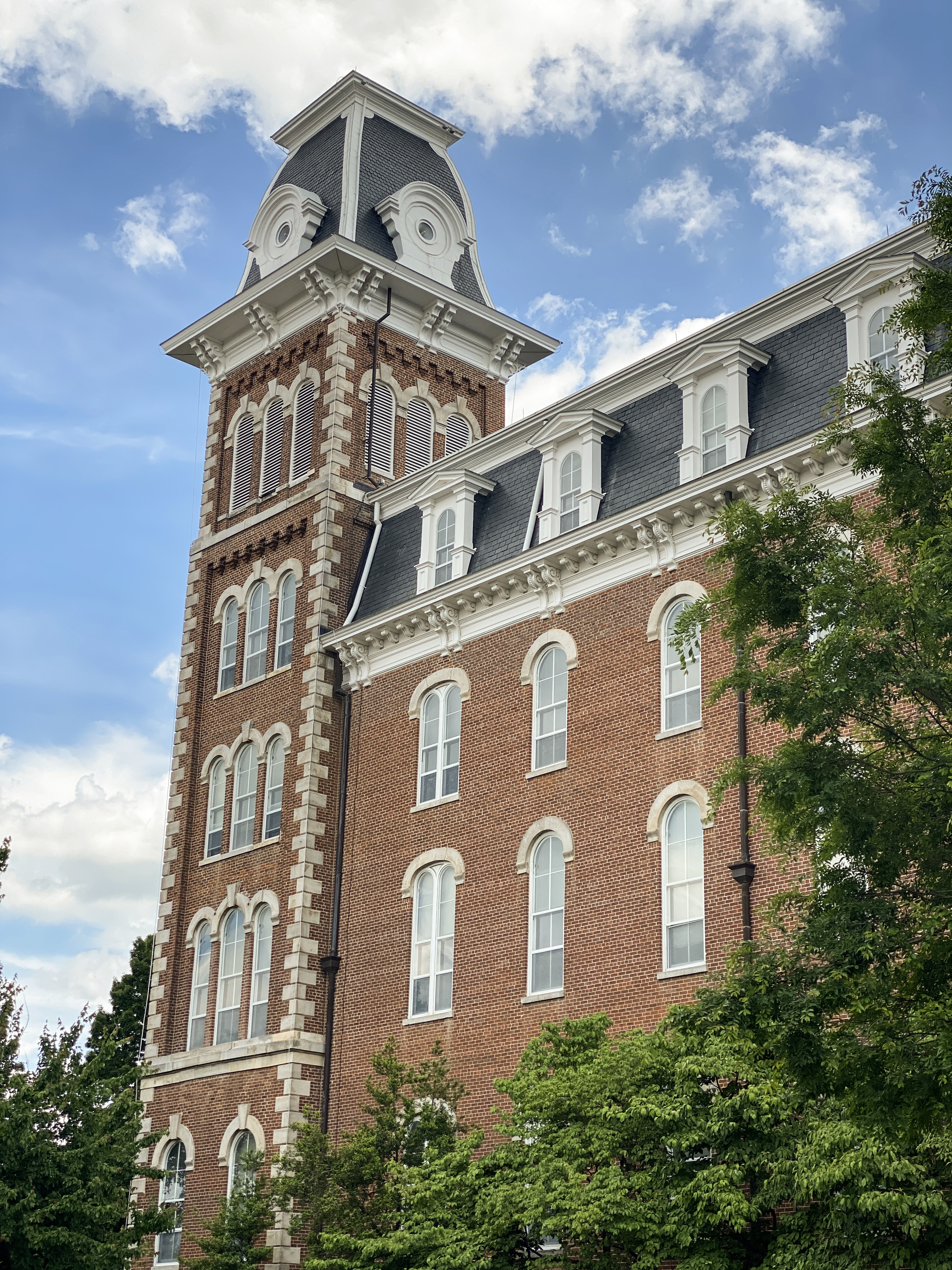
Old Main on the University of Arkansas campus

=== Early developments ===
The University of Arkansas was founded in 1871 on the site of a hilltop farm that overlooked the Ozark Mountains, giving it the nickname "The Hill".

The university was established under the Morrill Land-Grant Colleges Act of 1862. The university's founding also satisfied the provision in the Arkansas Constitution of 1868 that the General Assembly was to "establish and maintain a State University."

Bids from state towns and counties determined the university's location. The citizens of Fayetteville and Washington County pledged the most: $130,000 toward securing the university. Classes started on January 22, 1872.

=== Notable landmarks ===
Completed in 1875, Old Main, a two-towered brick building designed in the Second Empire style, was the primary instructional and administrative building. It is listed on the National Register of Historic Places. Its design was based on the plans for the main academic building at the University of Illinois, which has since been demolished. At Arkansas, the taller tower is the bell tower, and the shorter tower is the clock tower. In addition to the regular chimes of the clock, the university's Alma Mater plays at 5 pm every day.

Old Main contains classrooms, the restored Giffels Auditorium, as well as the administrative offices of the J. William Fulbright College of Arts and Sciences. The lawn at Old Main serves as an arboretum.

Beginning with the class of 1876, the names of students at University of Arkansas are inscribed in "Senior Walk" and wind across campus for more than four miles. More recently, the names of all the recipients of honorary degrees were added, including J. Edgar Hoover, Queen Noor, President Bill Clinton, and Hillary Clinton.

One unusual structure at Arkansas is the Chi Omega Greek Theatre, a gift to the school by the sorority's national headquarters. It marked the first time a national sorority presented a memorial of its foundation to the institution where it was founded. Chi Omega was organized in 1895, at the University of Arkansas, and is the mother (Psi) chapter of the national organization. The largest crowd ever assembled in the theatre was for a concert by the Army Air Corps Band during World War II. From 1934 to 1991, the space under the stage was used for a rifle range by the Army ROTC.

=== African American history and African studies program ===
The first African American student, James McGahee, attended the University of Arkansas in 1872, following the university's opening in 1871 during the Reconstruction era, to "prepare for the ministry of the Episcopal Church". He is noted as having a grade average deemed excellent. Alongside McGahee, two other African American men, Mark W. Alexander and Isom Washington, are noted as having attended Arkansas Industrial College, however no record of their enrollment has been found. Following the end of Reconstruction, the racial dynamic shifted at the university and it is unknown if McGahee was able to continue his education following 1873.

Former state senator and U.S. congressman John N. Tillman served as president of the University of Arkansas from 1905 to 1912. In the Arkansas State Senate he proposed the Separate Coach Law of 1891, a Jim Crow law to segregate African American passengers. The bill became law and was enforced for many decades.

The University of Arkansas admitted Silas Herbert Hunt of Texarkana, an African American veteran of World War II to the university's School of Law in 1948. Hunt's enrollment was regarded as the first successful school integration below the Mason–Dixon line of that era. While Hunt was admitted into the university, his attendance was not met without controversy. African American students were permitted to attend the university, under the condition that they enroll as graduate or law students, and be taught in segregated classes. Unfortunately, Silas Hunt was only able to complete one year of education. In April 1949, Hunt was admitted to the VA hospital, where he later died of tuberculosis, aggravated by injuries he had sustained in the war.

Roy Wilkins, administrator of the NAACP, wrote in 1950 that Arkansas was the "very first of the Southern states to accept the new trend without fighting a delaying action or attempting to... limit, if not nullify, bare compliance." In the fall of 1948, changes were made to the university's segregation policy, which allowed for the admittance of African American students into regular classes. The first to follow Hunt was a law school student by the name of Jackie L. Shropshire, would later go on to become the university's first black graduate in 1951. 1952 University of Arkansas Medical School graduate Edith Irby Jones, who was also admitted to the University of Arkansas in 1948, would be the first African American to be admitted in any Southern school. Several African American students followed in his footsteps, attending various graduate programs at the university. Arkansas was freely admitting African American students as early as 1957, while many southern states still prohibited black students from attending all white universities. The events in Little Rock at this time did some damage to race relations at the university that would not be fixed for some time.

The desegregation of the University of Arkansas was the first time a place of higher education in the south integrated African American students. It was the first to have black students enroll in any former confederate state since reconstruction. Fayetteville where the University of Arkansas is located was also the first southern city to implement an integration policy voluntarily. This is suggested to have been done from legal pressures to avoid litigation. This was also due to growing discontent with the separate but equal laws that were in place.

In 1969, the university created the Black Studies Advisory Committee to facilitate the creation of a Black Studies program, which began in the fall semester of 1968 with 19 courses offered.

In 1968 a group called Black Americans for Democracy or BAD was the first organization at the University of Arkansas in Fayetteville specifically founded to raise black awareness and advocate for African American students. Even though African American students had been admitted to the school in previous years they were still the minority, "Fewer than 150 out of the 9,000 students at the Fayetteville campus were African American" (in 1969). Since there were so few black students this organization created a space for community and expression when they were still small in numbers. They started their newspaper because they felt black students were not covered well in the campus wide paper The Arkansas Traveler. The group organized a choir and drama club, developed black fraternities and sororities, as well as closely followed the hiring of black professors and administrators. By the end of the 1970s the black student population at the school had increased by four times its original amount. Then in 1979 BAD changed their name to Students Taking a New Dimension or STAND. They kept their student programs they created and Black Emphasis Week, a week dedicated to black culture and student life on campus.

In 2004, the university provided resources to help support the program, establishing the John White Scholarship, Sankofa Registered Student Organization, and Ghana study abroad tour. In 2008, The Black Studies program was renamed the African and African American Studies (AAST) program and expanded its course offerings and student enrollment. In 2014, the program moved to a new space in Memorial Hall and was added to the University Core. A year later, an online minor and graduate certificate in African and African American Studies was established. The university hosted its first annual AAST Graduate Fellows search symposium in 2016 and established the Roy S. Bryce-Laporte scholarship later in 2018. In 2019, the University of Arkansas Board of Trustees voted to rename halls B and C of the Northwest Quad in honor of Gordon Morgan and Margaret Clark, respectively. The university has also hosted guest lectures by Aldon D. Morris, Carol Anderson, and Nikole Hannah-Jones related to African and African American studies.

==== Notable people in African and African American history at the university ====
- Gordon Daniel Morgan – an alumnus and one of the first Black professors at the University of Arkansas, and was hired to teach sociology
- Margaret Clark – one of the first Black professors at the University of Arkansas, and was hired to teach world languages
- Gerald Jordan – attended the University of Arkansas School of Journalism and Media, and is the university's current Faculty and Athletics Representative to NCAA and SEC

== Campus ==
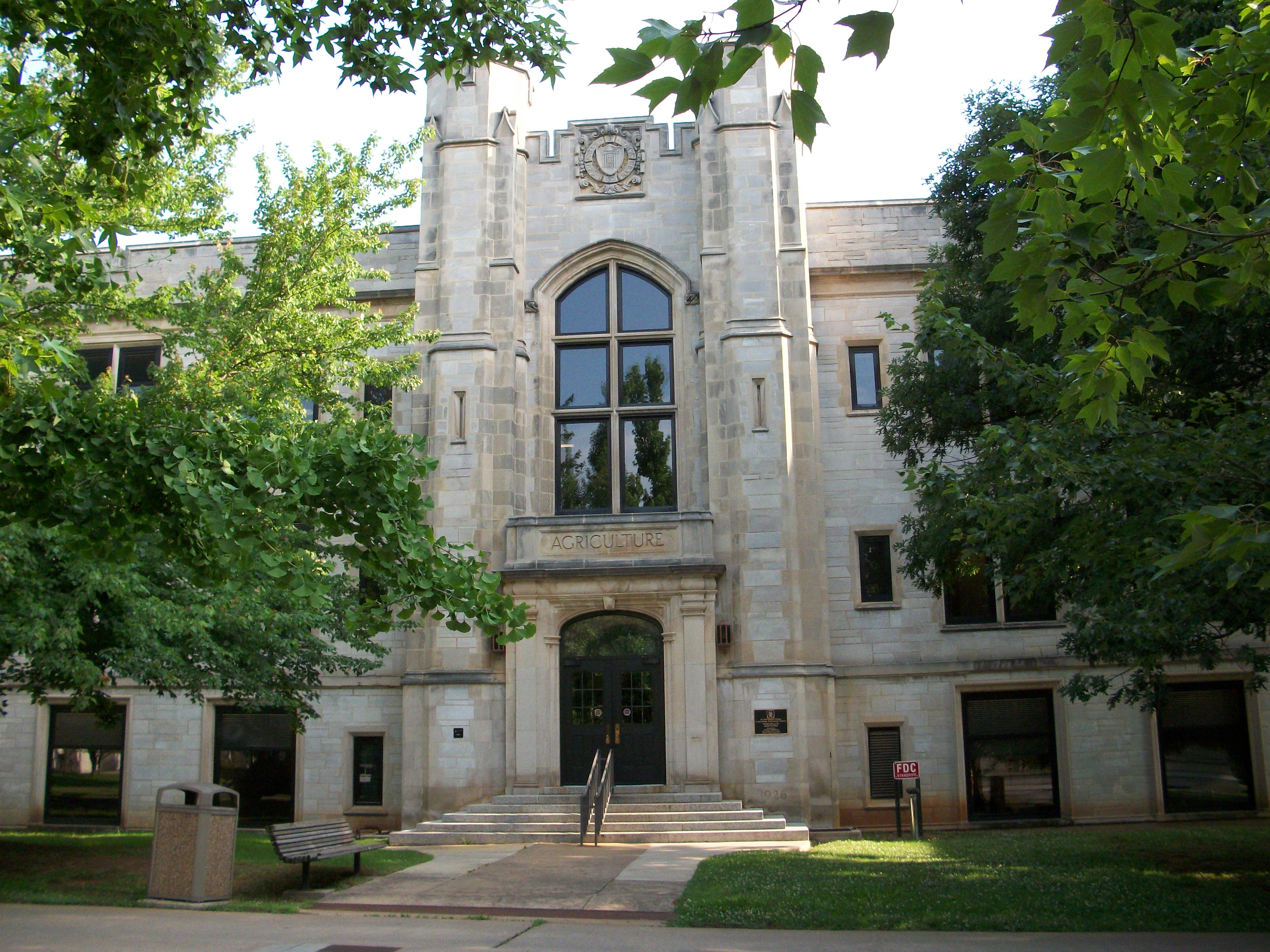
The University of Arkansas Agriculture Building is one example of Collegiate Gothic architecture on campus as part of the 1925 master plan.

The University of Arkansas campus sweeps across hilltops on the western side of Fayetteville, Arkansas. Among the 378 buildings on the campus, 11 buildings have been added to the National Register of Historic Places individually, with most buildings in the historic core being named as contributing properties to the University of Arkansas Campus Historic District.

Construction began on Old Main in 1873 and was completed by 1875 in the Second Empire architectural style. Built with local brick and sandstone, Old Main serves as the university's signature building. The building has remained on campus despite its recommended removal in the 1925 master plan from the architects of Jamieson and Spearl. This plan included destruction of all existing campus buildings and reconstruction in the Collegiate Gothic style. Several buildings were built in this style near the core of campus, including the Vol Walker Hall, Engineering Hall, Chemistry Building, Agriculture Building, and Home Economics Building. The plan ran out of funds and was never completed, leading to a somewhat haphazard arrangement of buildings after the 1930s.

The university's oldest tradition is Senior Walk, which contains the names of graduates from each class of the university. Beginning at the front steps of Old Main and running along the sidewalks across campus, Senior Walk is adorned with more than 170,000 names of former students. This tradition is unique to American universities.

The Fine Arts Center was designed by Fayetteville native Edward Durell Stone, who also designed Radio City Music Hall and the Museum of Modern Art in New York City and the John F. Kennedy Center for the Performing Arts in Washington, D.C. The buildings are indicative of Stone's idiosyncratic modern style which included patterns of ornament. Stone also designed a fraternity house, now used for academic purposes, and an apartment complex named Carlson Terrace on campus, which has since been demolished.

The east end of the University of Arkansas campus is adjacent to Dickson Street, which is one of the premier entertainment districts in the state. To the south of the university is Fayetteville High School, which contains nationally recognized academic and athletics programs.

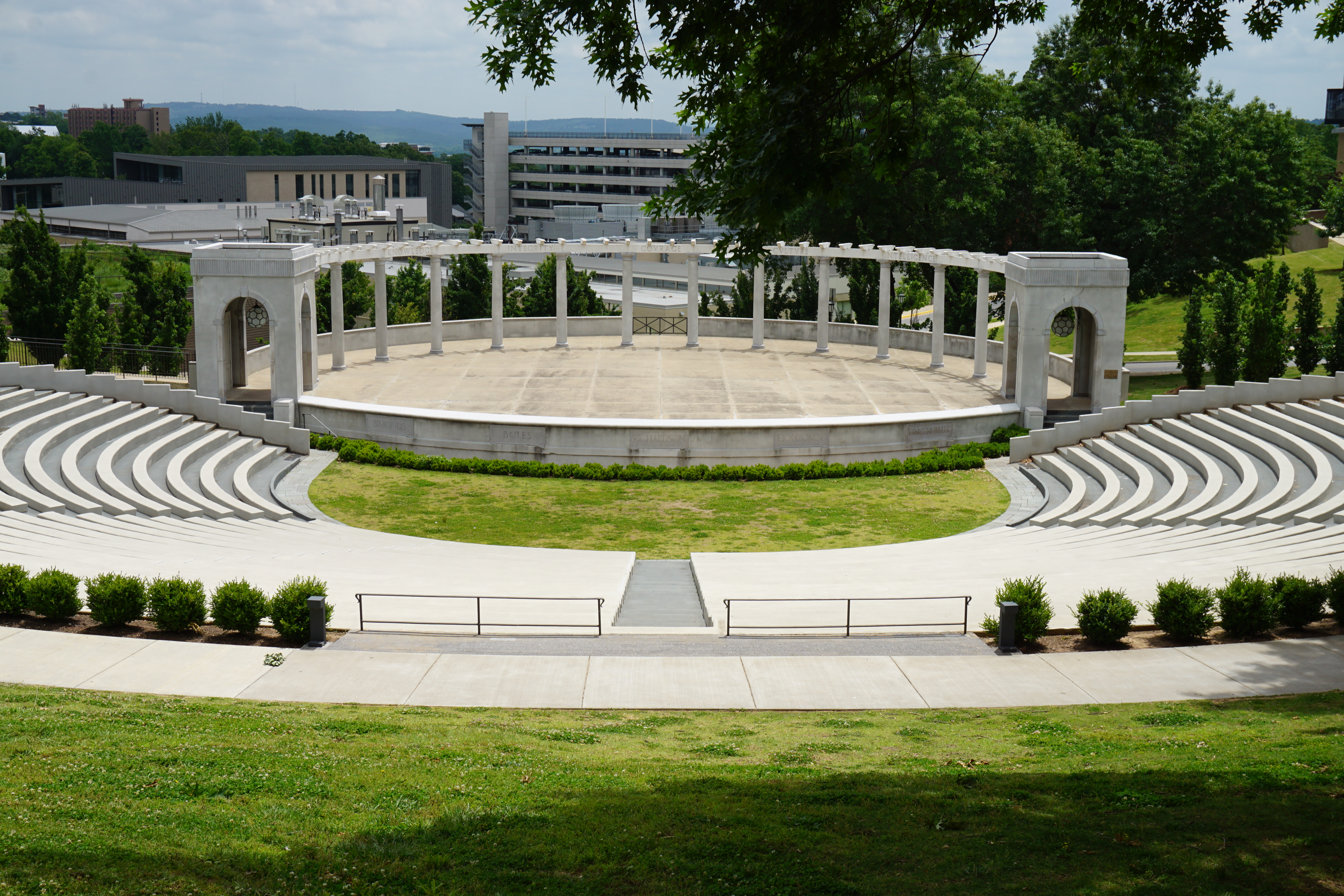
Chi Omega Greek Theatre

Many buildings are listed as part of the University of Arkansas Campus Historic District on the United States National Register of Historic Places.

=== Sustainability ===
One of the university's stated goals is to "promote environmental sustainability." In 2008, Arkansas adopted a climate action plan, including the goals of reducing greenhouse gas emissions by 50% by 2020 and to become carbon-neutral by 2040. In 2008, the university signed a $22.9 million contract with Energy Systems Group to make energy improvements to 56 buildings, a program named "Razor's EDGE." The program was designed with a payback period of 13 years based upon projected electricity and water savings.

=== System facilities ===
Altogether there are thirteen branches and six other units in the University of Arkansas System, including the University of Arkansas for Medical Sciences in Little Rock; four-year campuses in Fayetteville, Fort Smith, Little Rock, Monticello, and Pine Bluff; and two-year community or technical college campuses in Batesville, De Queen, Helena-West Helena, Hope, Mena, North Little Rock, and Morrilton. Units also under the UA System include the Clinton School of Public Service, the Criminal Justice Institute, the Arkansas Archeological Survey, the Division of Agriculture, the Winthrop Rockefeller Institute, and the Arkansas School for Mathematics, Sciences, and the Arts.

The University of Arkansas was the home for the Southeastern Conference Academic Consortium, SECAC, where the 14 member schools of the Southeastern Conference pool resources to assist each other academically (the Consortium later relocated to Birmingham, Alabama, where the SEC has its headquarters).

== Academics ==
Academic rankings

National
- Forbes: 158
- U.S. News & World Report: 183 (tie)
- Washington Monthly: 295
- WSJ/College Pulse: 392

Global
- ARWU: 501–600
- QS: 1001–1200
- THE: 601–800
- U.S. News & World Report: 806 (tie)

The University of Arkansas offers more than 200 programs of study leading to bachelors, masters, doctoral, and law degrees. Academic programs are organized into numerous departments and schools based out of the ten primary colleges on the main campus. The following degree-granting academic divisions are located on the Fayetteville campus:

College/school founding
College/school	Year founded
Dale Bumpers College of Agricultural, Food and Life Sciences	1905
College of Engineering	1912
College of Education & Health Professions	1912
J. William Fulbright College of Arts and Sciences	1912
School of Law	1924
Sam M. Walton College of Business	1926
Graduate School and International Education	1927
Fay Jones School of Architecture and Design	1974

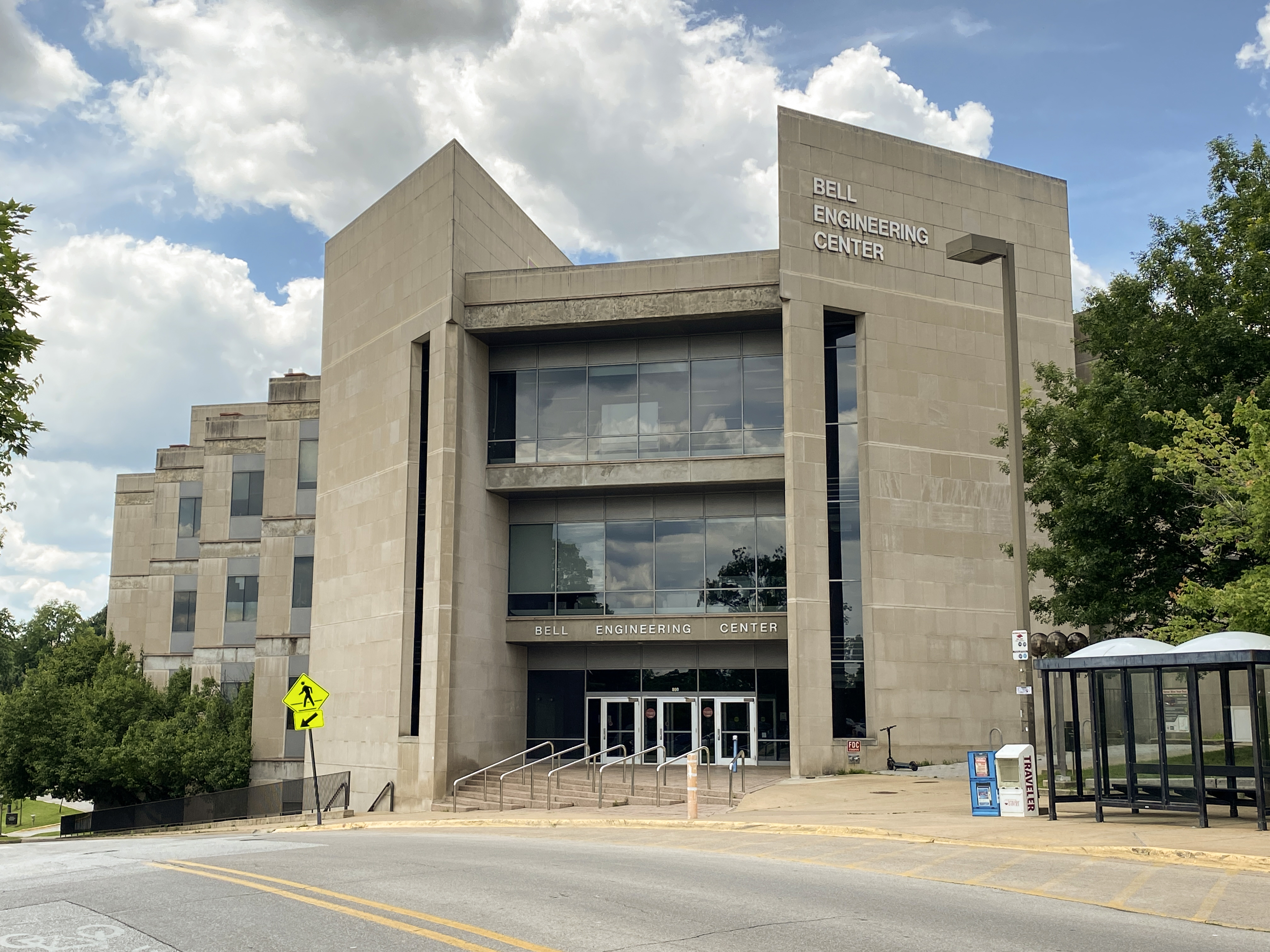
Bell Engineering Center, College of Engineering

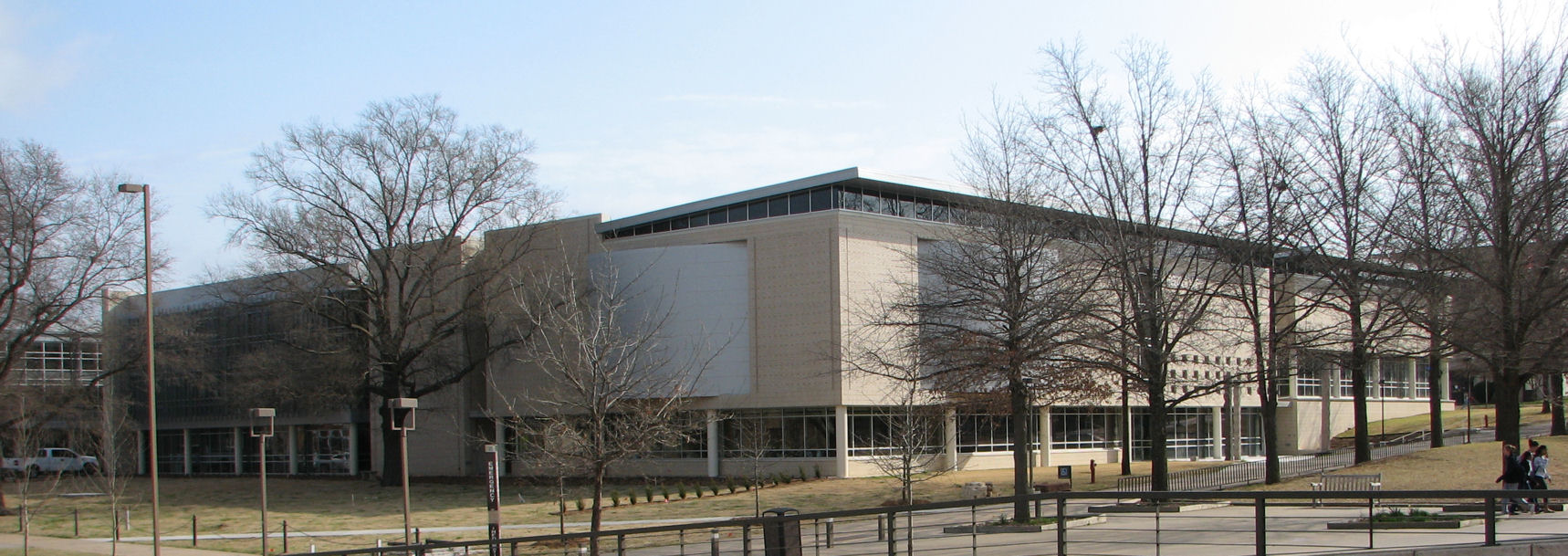
University of Arkansas School of Law

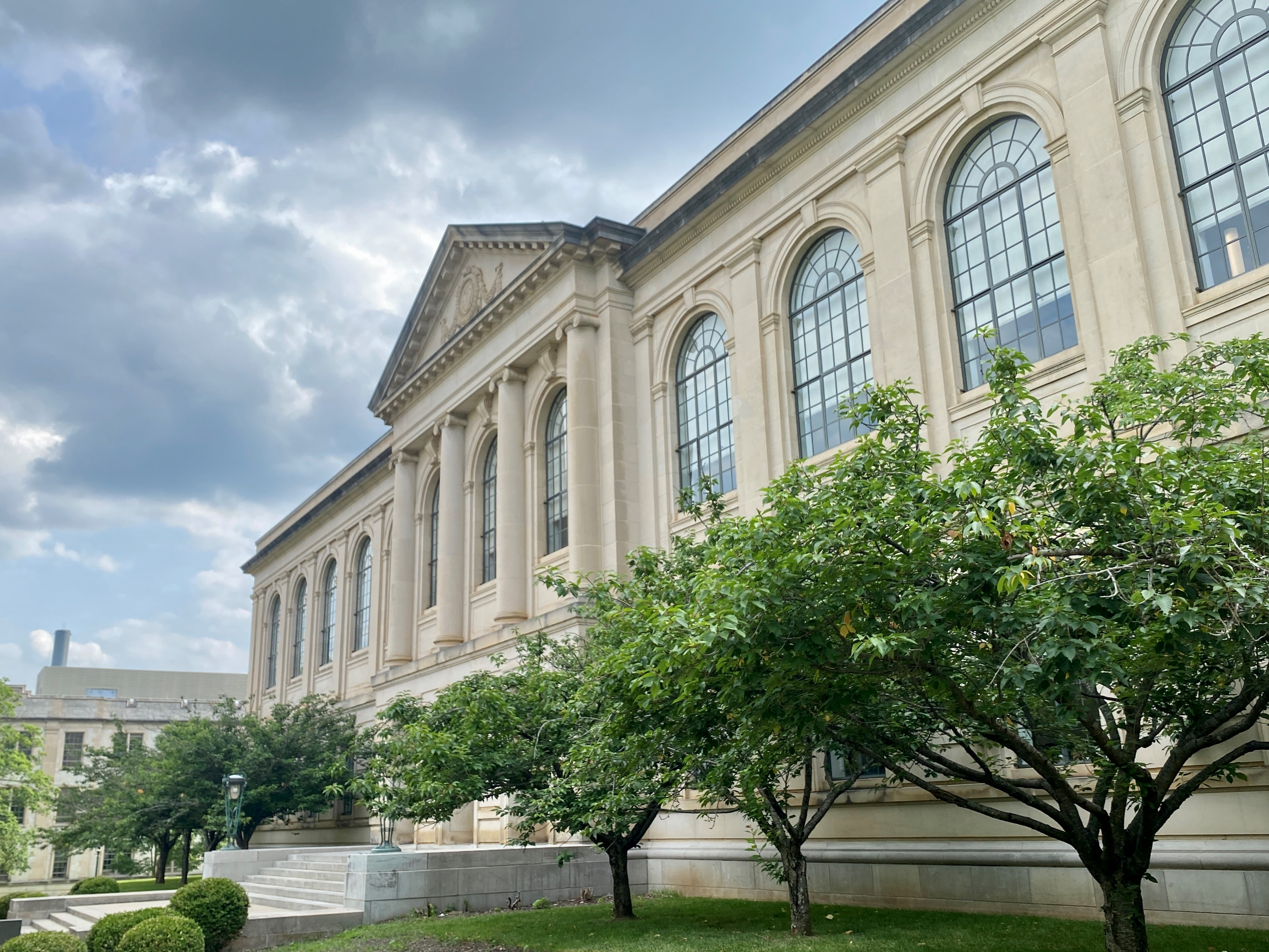
Vol Walker Hall, School of Architecture

The Honors College and Global Campus do not award degrees, but provide degree programs with honors coursework and distance education opportunities, respectively, for the Fayetteville campus:

College/school founding
College/school	Year founded
Honors College	2002
Global Campus (School of Continuing Education and Academic Outreach)	1969

For the 2024–2025 academic year, the middle 50% of enrolled students scored between 1070 and 1380 on the SAT (with a 50th percentile of 1230), between 530 and 690 on the SAT Evidence-Based Reading and Writing section (50th percentile: 610), and between 540 and 690 on the SAT Math section (50th percentile: 620).

=== Research ===
Vitamin E was co-discovered by UA Agricultural Chemistry Professor Barnett Sure. Sure co-discovered vitamin E and extended knowledge of how vitamin E, amino acids, and B-vitamins function on reproduction and lactation. Kik also developed the process for parboiling rice (a major agricultural crop in the state) to increase retention of vitamins and shorten cooking time. Sure and Kik were Agricultural Experiment Station scientists and professors in the UA Department of Agricultural Chemistry, which merged in 1964 with Home Economics, now the School of Human Environmental Sciences.

In the 1920s, Loy Barton, an engineering graduate student at the University of Arkansas, set forth the principle of high-level Class B plate modulation for radio transmission and developed the technology that allowed small- and medium-size AM radio stations to flourish across the United States. Barnett later joined RCA and continued research on broadcast technology into the 1960s.

The most widely implemented automated mail sorting equipment in the world–the Wide Area Bar Code Reader–was developed by the University of Arkansas College of Engineering. A $50,000 grant from the United States Postal Service (USPS) to Professors Dwight F. Mix and J.E. Bass in 1989 began the research and development effort. By 1999, more than 15,000 University of Arkansas bar code readers were located in every major USPS facility, increasing the efficiency of processing 20 billion pieces of mail a year at a savings of $200 million. This R&D effort has spawned four additional electronic systems to help the USPS "read the mail."

During the 1980s, Professors Allen Hermann and Zhengzhi Sheng of the Department of Physics researched superconductivity, the phenomenon whereby Direct Current (DC) electricity, once started, can flow essentially forever. The Thallium-based material they discovered at Arkansas held the world's record for high temperature, 125K, for five years (1988–93) and drew international attention to the university. Their work led to patents and a manufacturing agreement, as well as further advances in high-density electronics.

University of Arkansas plant pathologists conducted research in the early 1970s that led to COLLEGO, the first biological herbicide for weed control in a field crop. Other UA scientists and students worked on the project that resulted in EPA registration of COLLEGO by Upjohn in 1982 for control of northern jointvetch in rice and soybeans. The work provided a model used worldwide to develop biological herbicides. Leadership in this area helped the U of A obtain grants from the USDA and others for construction of the Rosen Center for Alternative Pest Control.

Distinguished Professor Peter Stuart Ungar, a palaeoanthropologist and palaeoecologist in the Department of Environmental Dynamics, has pioneered novel methods of reconstructing the diets of extant and extinct animals. In particular, Ungar has used dental microwear to determine the diets of extinct hominins such as Australopithecus, Paranthropus, and Homo naledi, overturning earlier assumptions about ancient hominin diets that were based solely on jaw and tooth morphology. In addition to his research on hominins, Ungar has also used dental microwear to study the diets of extinct victoriapithecids, cercopithecids, pliopithecids, lemurs, rodents, felids, hyaenids, canids, ursids, tragulids, cervids, bovids, suids, and tyrannosaurids. In 2024, Ungar was chosen to become a member of the National Academy of Sciences of the United States of America for his contributions to the study of the diets of ancient organisms.

== Athletics ==
The mascot for the University of Arkansas is the Razorback, a type of wild boar, and Arkansas teams are often referred to as the Hogs (shortened version of Razorbacks). The school competes in the Southeastern Conference (SEC) in Division I of the NCAA.

From 1971 through 2007, Arkansas had separate men's and women's athletic departments. On January 1, 2008, the two departments merged, leaving fellow SEC school Tennessee as the only remaining NCAA Division I school with separate men's and women's athletic programs.

=== Football ===
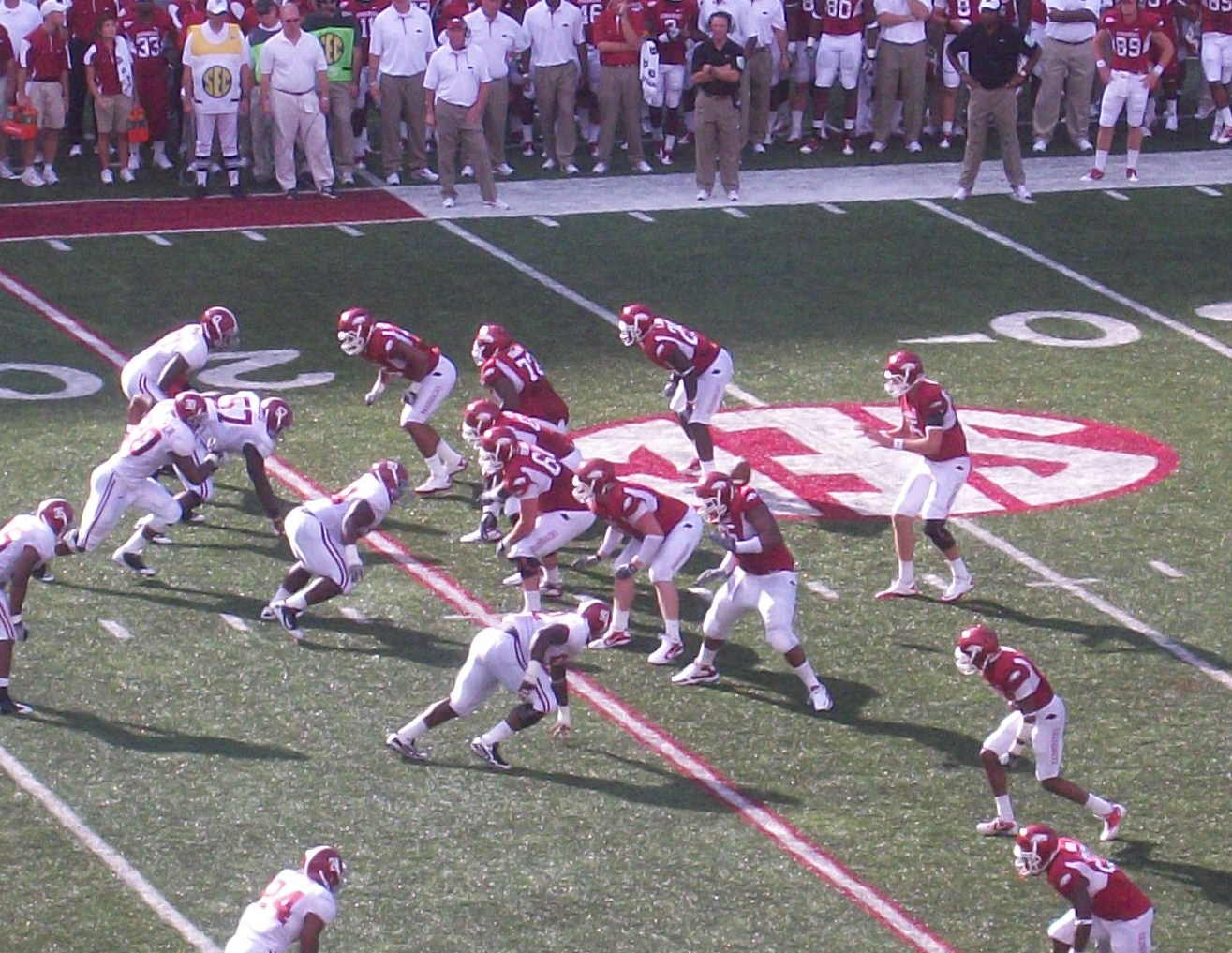
The 2010 Arkansas Razorbacks football team playing against the Alabama Crimson Tide in September 2010

A football team began representing the University of Arkansas in 1894 and has since become one of the nation's top 25 programs in terms of all-time wins at the Football Bowl Subdivision level. The program was a charter member of the Southwest Conference (SWC) in 1915 and remained in that conference until departing for the Southeastern Conference in 1991, where Arkansas has remained. From 1915 to 1991, the Razorbacks won the SWC championship 13 times and the national championship in the 1964 season, with great success coming under coaches Frank Broyles, Lou Holtz and Ken Hatfield. Today, the team plays its home games on campus at Donald W. Reynolds Razorback Stadium, or at War Memorial Stadium, located in Little Rock, making the University of Arkansas the only Division I program with two home stadia. Arkansas has also had recent success in the Bowl Championship Series (BCS) era, obtaining its first BCS berth in the 2011 Sugar Bowl and climbing as high as #3 in the BCS rankings in 2011 under Bobby Petrino.

=== Basketball ===
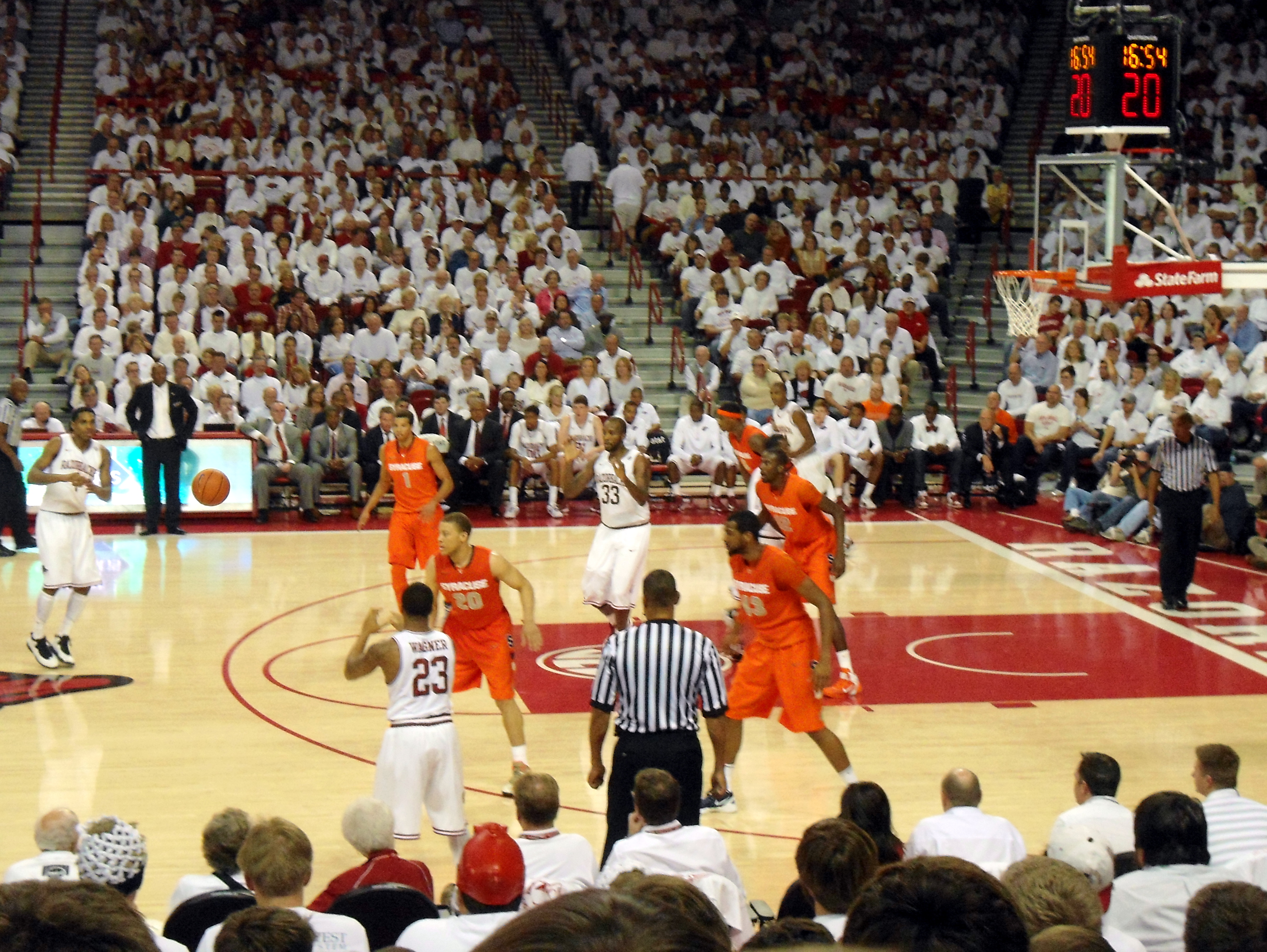
The 2012-13 Razorbacks in action against Syracuse

The men's basketball team plays their home games in Bud Walton Arena on the University of Arkansas campus, one of the largest home arenas in college basketball. The team won the 1994 National Championship under coach Nolan Richardson, and has been to six Final Fours (1941, 1945, 1978, 1990, 1994, 1995). Arkansas basketball was the winningest program in the Southwest Conference, winning the conference 22 times, the most of any of the SWC schools. This conference dominance led the Hogs to be named the eighth-best program in history by Street and Smith's magazine.

The Razorback women's basketball team, like the men's basketball team, plays home games in Bud Walton Arena, often referred to as the "Basketball Palace of Mid-America." The building is located on the University of Arkansas campus. The women's basketball team completed its 39th season in 2014–15, and has made 21 post season appearances. The Razorbacks made their first NCAA Women's Final Four appearance in 1998, with the help of team leader Christy Smith, and made history as the lowest seed (#9) in the west to advance. On March 7, 2020, the team made it to the semifinals in the SEC tournament in Greenville, South Carolina, with coach Mike Neighbors and were ranked #22 for the 2019–20 season, which has been the team's highest ranking since January 2011. This was also the first time the Lady Razorbacks have been ranked in the top 25 since 2015 and started off the season in the top 25 since 2002.

=== Baseball and softball ===
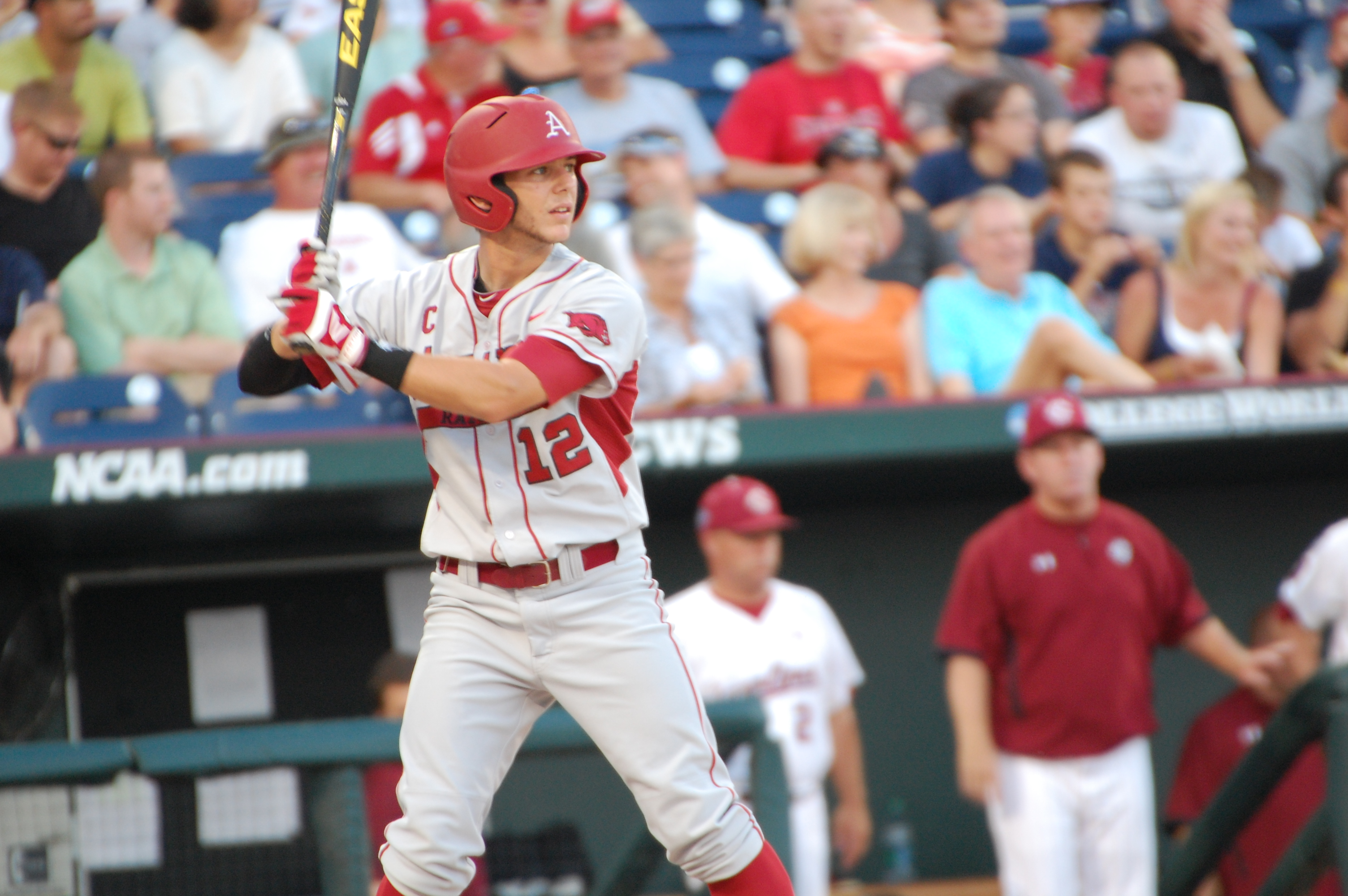
Razorback Bo Bigham bats at the 2012 College World Series in Omaha, Nebraska

The Arkansas baseball team has had success both in the Southwest Conference, and in the Southeastern Conference. Between 1979 and 1989, the Diamond Hogs appeared in the College World Series four times, including a runner-up finish in 1979. Since joining the SEC, the team has been to the 2004, 2009, 2012, 2015, 2018, 2019 and 2022 College World Series. The team plays home games in Baum Stadium, recognized in 1998 by Baseball America magazine as being one of the top collegiate ballparks in America, and was #3 in 2009 according to Rivals.com. The stadium has recently undergone expansion, including 20 new skyboxes (34 in all) and seats behind the bullpen in left field, and further expansion to enclose the park with seating has been included in the Athletic Facilities Master Plan. On April 7, 2009, a stadium record 11,044 fans saw a 7–3 Razorbacks victory over the #1 Arizona State Sun Devils. A weekend series with LSU in 2007 drew 29,931, which is the SEC all-time attendance record for a three-game series.

The Arkansas Razorback softball team plays their home games at Bogle Park, located on the University of Arkansas campus. Bogle Park was made possible thanks to the lead gift made by Bob and Marilyn Bogle and the Bogle family, who have also made significant contributions to the university and the Athletics Department over the course of many years. An event celebrating the naming was held Friday, October 26, 2009. The Lady Razorbacks participate in the Western Division of the Southeastern Conference, also known as the SEC. The team has made NCAA Tournament appearances in: 2000, 2002, 2008, 2009, 2010, 2012, 2013, 2017, 2018, and 2019.

=== Track and field ===
The most successful program in NCAA history, the Arkansas men's track and field and cross country teams are the most decorated teams in the athletics department. The program has won a total of 41 national titles (19 Indoor Championships, 11 Outdoor Championships, and 11 Cross Country Championships), the last being the 2013 Indoor Track and Field National Championship (the 2004 and 2005 Outdoor Championships were later vacated due to NCAA infractions). One of its most famous stars is graduate Alistair Cragg who competed for Ireland at the 2004 Summer Olympics in Greece. Other Olympians have included Michael Conley, Daniel Lincoln, Graham Hood, Wallace Spearmon, Paul Donovan, and Matt Hemingway. The team has a home indoor track at the Randal Tyson Track Center and outdoor field at John McDonnell Field, which hosted the 2009 NCAA Outdoor Track Championships. The team won the 2009, 2010, and 2012 SEC Indoor Track Championships, along with the 2009 and 2011 SEC Outdoor Championships and the 2010, 2011 and 2012 SEC Cross Country Championships. The men's track and field team won the triple crown in 2012.

The women's track and field team won its first national championship at the 2015 NCAA Indoor Championships, held in Fayetteville. Coached by Lance Harter, team members took first place in pole vault, the 3000-meter run and the distance-medley relay. Top competitors include Olympians Veronica Campbell-Brown and Deena Kastor, who set the American marathon record at the 2006 London Marathon. Since then, the team has won four NCAA Division I championships, two in indoor track and field, and two in outdoor track and field. The team also swept the 2019 calendar, winning the indoor, outdoor and cross country national championships. The athletes have access to indoor training and racing facilities at the Randal Tyson Track Center and outdoor facilities at John McDonnell Field located on the University of Arkansas campus.

=== Women's athletics ===
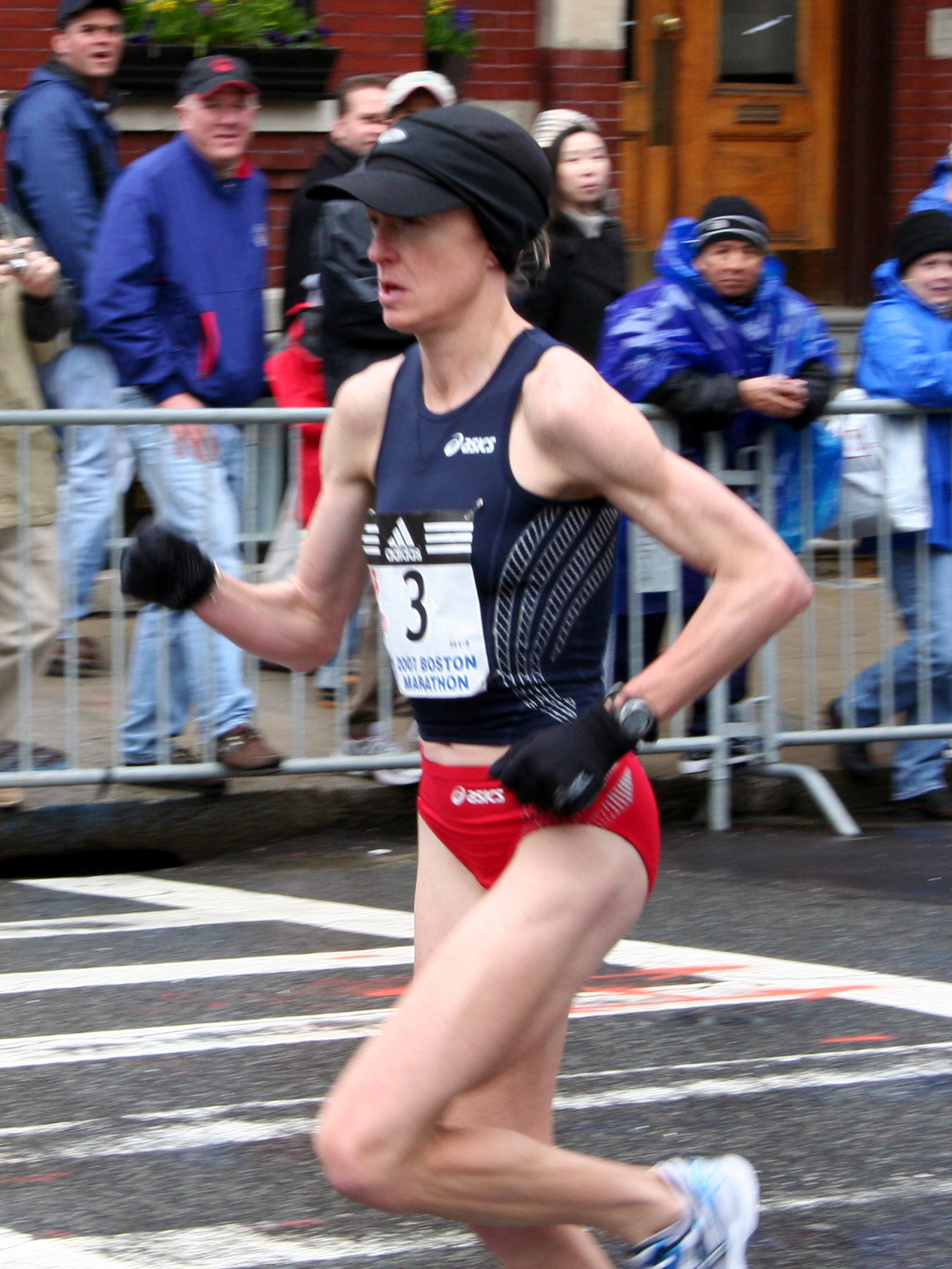
Deena (Drossin) Kastor

The women's teams at the University of Arkansas are also referred to as the Razorbacks. There are 11 varsity women sports: basketball, cross country, indoor and outdoor track, golf, gymnastics, soccer, softball, swimming & diving, tennis, and volleyball. Among the most successful women's teams are volleyball, with 11 SEC Western Division titles; cross country, with more SEC championships than any member institution; basketball, with 12 postseason appearances in 30 years, including the 1998 NCAA Final Four; track & field, with six SEC titles and the first back-to-back women's SEC triple crowns; and gymnastics, nationally ranked since the start of the program in 2002, with five NCAA Women's Gymnastics Championship appearances. Sprinter Veronica Campbell was the first Razorback woman to win a gold medal in the Olympics, with marathoner Deena Kastor, an alumna, bringing home a bronze medal in 2004.

In 2019, Jordyn Wieber was hired as the University of Arkansas head coach, following the retirement of Mark Cook. Wieber was one of the "Fierce Five" in the 2012 Summer Olympics. The gymnastics team, referred to as the GymBacks, practice at the Bev Lewis Center for Women's Athletics and compete in Barnhill Arena. As for the 2020 season, the team now holds seven beam titles and nine floor titles. The GymBacks started the 2020 season ranked #19 by the Women's Collegiate Gymnastics Association. This is the 14th year in a row the gymnastics team has been ranked in the top 20.

The Razorback volleyball team practices and plays in the legendary Barnhill Arena, which used to house the men's and women's basketball teams before moving to Bud Walton Arena in 1993. As of 2013, the volleyball team had made 11 NCAA Tournament appearances. In 2015, the Razorbacks were one of just three teams ranked top 10 nationally in both hitting percentage and opponent hitting percentage. In more recent years, four Razorback volleyball players were invited to the US Women's Volleyball tryouts in February 2020.

In 2016, the swim and dive team placed 11th at the SEC Conference Championship and, the following year, the team placed 10th. The 2020–21 season was kicked off on November 7, with the team facing the Missouri Tigers. There were fourteen events held that day and the Razorbacks won seven of them. The impressive Brooke Schultz, earned NCAA Zone qualifying scores on the 3-meter and 1-meter springboard events.

== Student life ==
Undergraduate demographics as of Fall 2023
Race and ethnicity	Total
White	75%
Hispanic	11%
Two or more races	5%
Black	4%
Asian	3%
American Indian/Alaska Native	1%
International student	1%
Unknown	1%
Economic diversity
Low-income (Note: The percentage of students who received an income-based federal Pell grant intended for low-income students.)	18%
Affluent (Note: The percentage of students who are a part of the American middle class at the bare minimum.)	82%

There are over 350 registered student organizations on campus, including special interest, religious, international and cultural organizations, honorary and professional service groups, and more.

The most recognized student organization on campus is the Associated Student Government (ASG). The student government manages student fees, meets with administrators, and is involved in many decisions made on behalf of students. The ASG, University Parking, and Razorback Transit manage the Safe Ride program (supported by the DRJ-III Memorial Foundation) which gives students a safe ride home from any unsafe or uncomfortable situation.

Arkansas is home of The Razorback, a national award-winning student yearbook, UATV, a student-run television station, and The Arkansas Traveler, a national-award-winning student newspaper established in 1906. The university is also home to two radio stations: KUAF, a public radio station and NPR affiliate, and KXUA, an eclectic student-run station.

The University of Arkansas Press is known for publishing works on local and Southern history, as well as its strong poetry series, including books of poetry by former president Jimmy Carter and the former national poet laureate Billy Collins.

=== Greek life ===
There are dozens of fraternities and sororities on campus. 31% of University of Arkansas students participate in Greek life.

== Traditions ==
=== Senior walk ===
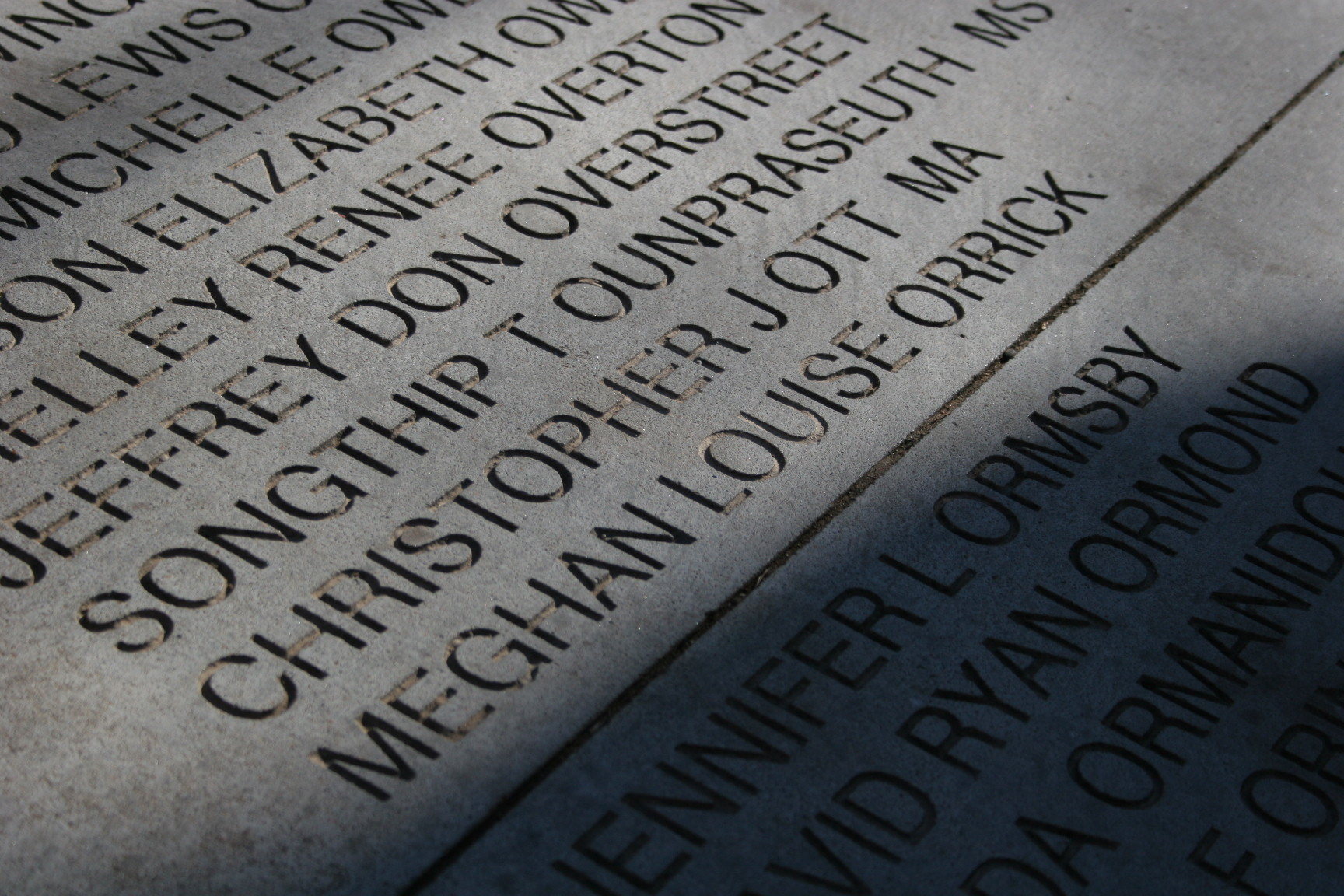
A sample of class of 2001 graduates

The names of University of Arkansas students, starting with the first senior class of 1876, are carved into one of the concrete walkways or sidewalks on campus. This tradition was started by the 1905 graduating class of students, who drew their names into the walkway in front of Old Main. Through most of the 20th century, the names were impressed in wet cement using brass letters. In 1986, the university's physical plant developed a special machine to engrave the thousands of names required each year. In 2020, to preserve the walk, the university replaced it with high-grade monumental concrete, reinforced with steel bar, and the names were sandblasted in their original handwriting.

=== Spoofer's Stone ===
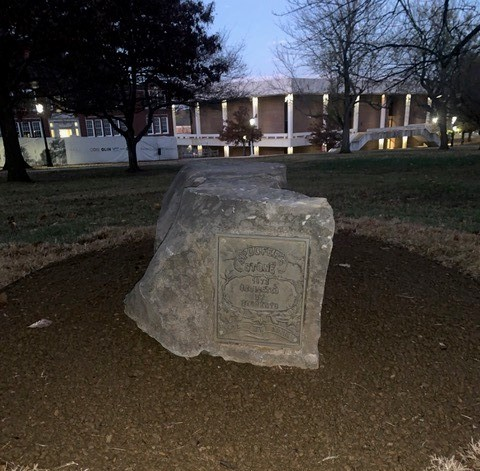
Spoofer's Stone after its 2020 repair

Sitting at the edge of Old Main lawn is Spoofer's Stone, a large chunk of limestone left behind by a broken oxcart after the completion of the construction of Old Main in 1875. The large stone quickly became a resting spot for students. At this time, male and female students were not allowed to interact on campus. Female students began leaving letters in the rock for their male friends (or romantic interests). In 1933, the female students at the university noticed the damage done to the stone from regular wear and tear and decided to have the stone mounted in a concrete base. A plaque was added to the stone commemorating the 1932-33 class who raised the money for the repair. In the years after, Spoofer's Stone became a popular engagement spot for couples who met while attending the University of Arkansas. It became tradition for couples who were engaged there to chip off a small piece of the stone as a memento.

=== "Calling the Hogs" ===
Fans of the University of Arkansas have been "Calling the Hogs" since the 1920s. This tradition, which refers to the school's most popular cheer at sporting events, is said to have begun when a group of farmers attending a game began issuing hog calls to encourage a lagging Razorback football team. The encouragement worked and the attending crowd took notice of the farmers' calling. By the next game, a group of men had organized to cry "Wooo, Pig, Sooie". The call has since become the school's best-known cheer.

=== Alma mater ===
The University of Arkansas "Alma Mater" was written in 1909 by Brodie Payne, an alumnus of the University of Arkansas. Henry D. Tovey, director of the Glee Club at the time, set the song to music.

=== Fight song ===
Originally known as the "Field Song", the words and tune of the University of Arkansas Fight Song were written in 1913 by William Edwin Douglas while he was an undergraduate. Music was added by Henry D. Tovey, Douglas's music professor, and the song eventually became adopted as the "Arkansas Fight Song".

=== School colors and mascot ===
Tusk, the live mascot of the University of Arkansas

The school color of cardinal red (Pantone #201) was chosen as the official school color by a vote of the student body in 1895. The two color choices were cardinal and heliotrope. White was added as a complementary color at a later date.

The University of Arkansas mascot has not always been the Razorbacks. From 1894, when the football program began, until 1910, the official mascot was the Cardinals to complement the school color of cardinal red. In 1909, according to school lore, the head football coach Hugo Bezdek gave a speech to a large group of students at the Fayetteville train station after returning from a victory over LSU in 1909 during an undefeated season. Coach Bezdek informed the crowd that his team had performed "like a wild band of Razorback hogs." Although students had begun referring to the team as the Razorbacks as early as 1907, Bezdek's statement popularized the use of Razorback for the team. The Razorback, which is characterized by a ridged back and tenacious wild fighting ability, had long been associated with the backwoods of Arkansas. The students loved the comparison, and the nickname became increasingly popular. In 1910, the student body voted to change the official university mascot from the Cardinal to the Razorback.

Live hogs were occasionally brought to football games as early as the 1920s, but providing a permanent live mascot dates back to the 1960s and a number of hogs have represented Arkansas since then. Tusk, a 380-pound Russian boar that closely resembles a wild razorback hog, is the current official live mascot. He resides on a local farm and leaves his home to attend all Arkansas home football games, and other select events.

Additionally, the University of Arkansas has a family of uniformed mascots. "Big Red", (also known as the "Fighting Razorback"), is the traditional mascot for the university and attends all athletic events. "Sue E" is the female hog and "Pork Chop" is the kid mascot. "Boss Hog" is a nine-foot inflatable mascot that joined the mascot family during the 1998–99 football season.

=== Razorback Marching Band ===
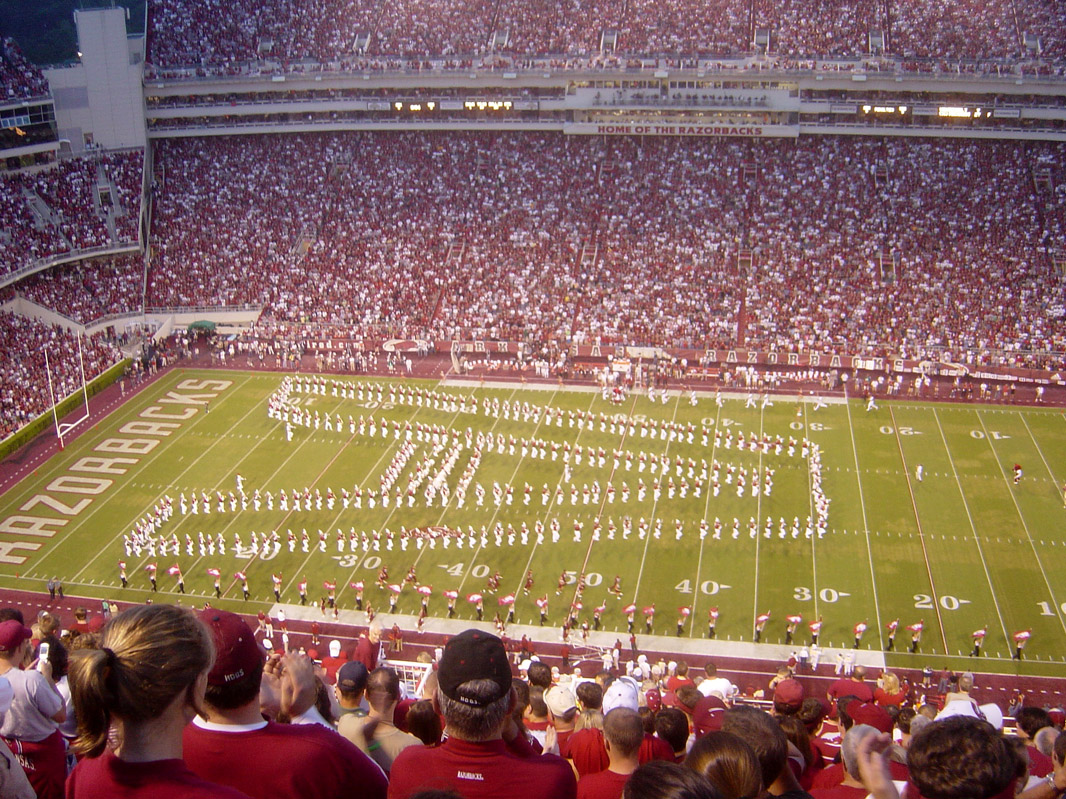
The Razorback Marching Band in formation at Razorback Stadium

The Razorback Marching Band, one of the oldest collegiate bands in the United States, was formed in 1874 as the Cadet Corps Band as part of the military art department. The band participated in all the formalities of the Military Art Department, as well as playing for football games, pageants, and commencement exercises.

In 1947, following a steady post World War II growth, the Cadet Corp Band was divided into the three current bands, a football band, a concert band, and an R.O.T.C. band.

In 1956, the band adopted the name "Marching Razorbacks."

In 2006, the Razorback Marching Band was awarded the highest honor bestowed upon a collegiate marching band, the Sudler Trophy. The band has also performed at the 2011 Allstate Sugar Bowl, the 2012 AT&T Cotton Bowl Classic, many other bowl games, and Dallas Cowboys football games.

As of 2020, the 350-member Razorback Marching Band, along with the Hogwild Pep Band and four concert bands, make up over two percent of the university's undergraduate population.

=== Schola Cantorum ===
The University of Arkansas Schola Cantorum was created in 1957 by founding director Richard Brothers. Since then, Schola Cantorum has proudly represented the University of Arkansas across the country and on various international concert tours.

In 1962, Schola Cantorum was the first choir to win the Guido d'Arezzo Award at the International Polyphonic Competition in Arezzo, Italy. In honor of its achievement, Schola Cantorum soon after appeared on NBC TV's Today Show and performed for U.S. President John F. Kennedy in the White House Rose Garden.

At every graduation ceremony, Schola Cantorum sings the National Anthem, the alma mater, and an invocation. The choir participates at national and global events, as well as a number of events on campus.

== Notable people ==
Notable University of Arkansas alumni

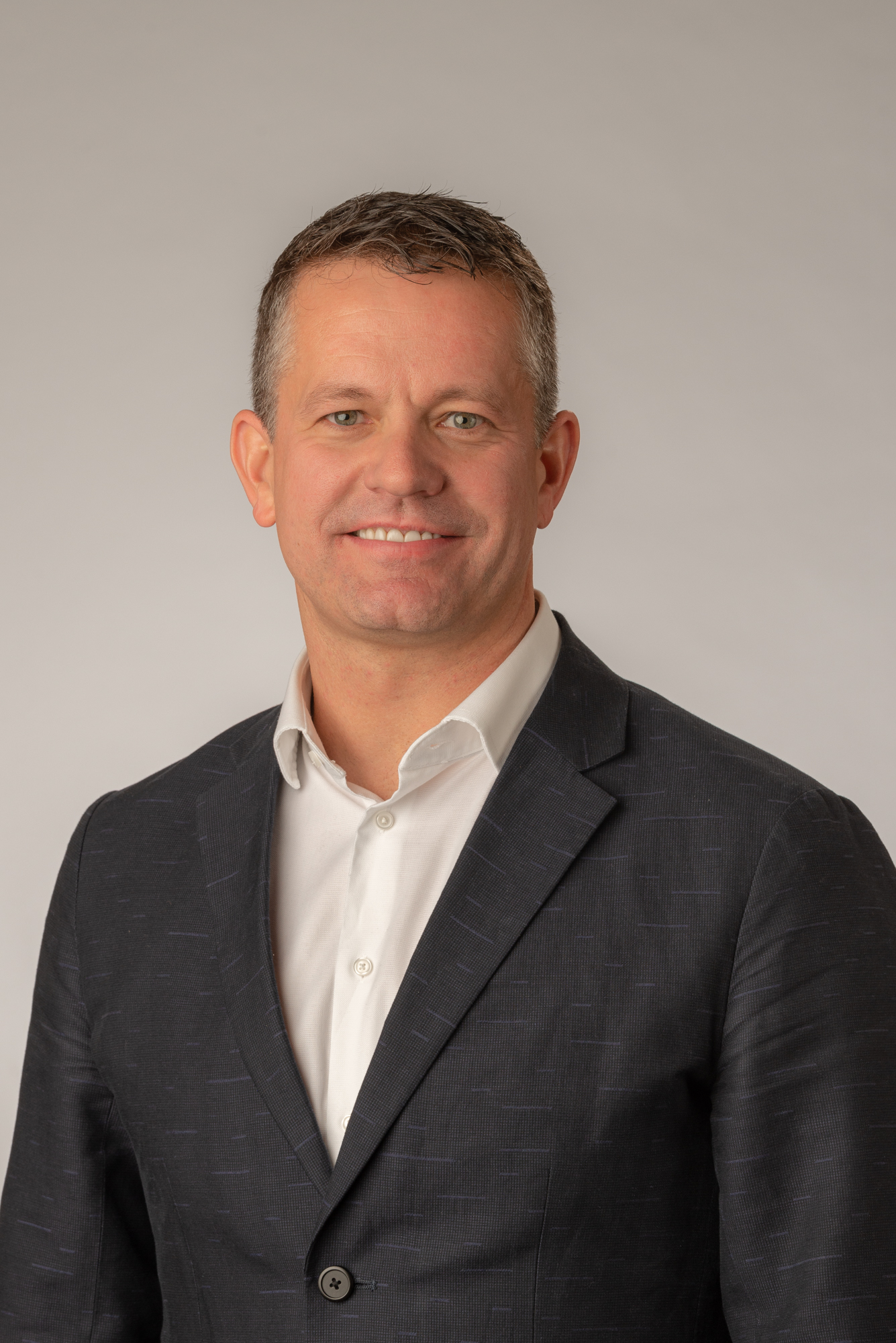
John Furner, president and CEO of Walmart Inc.

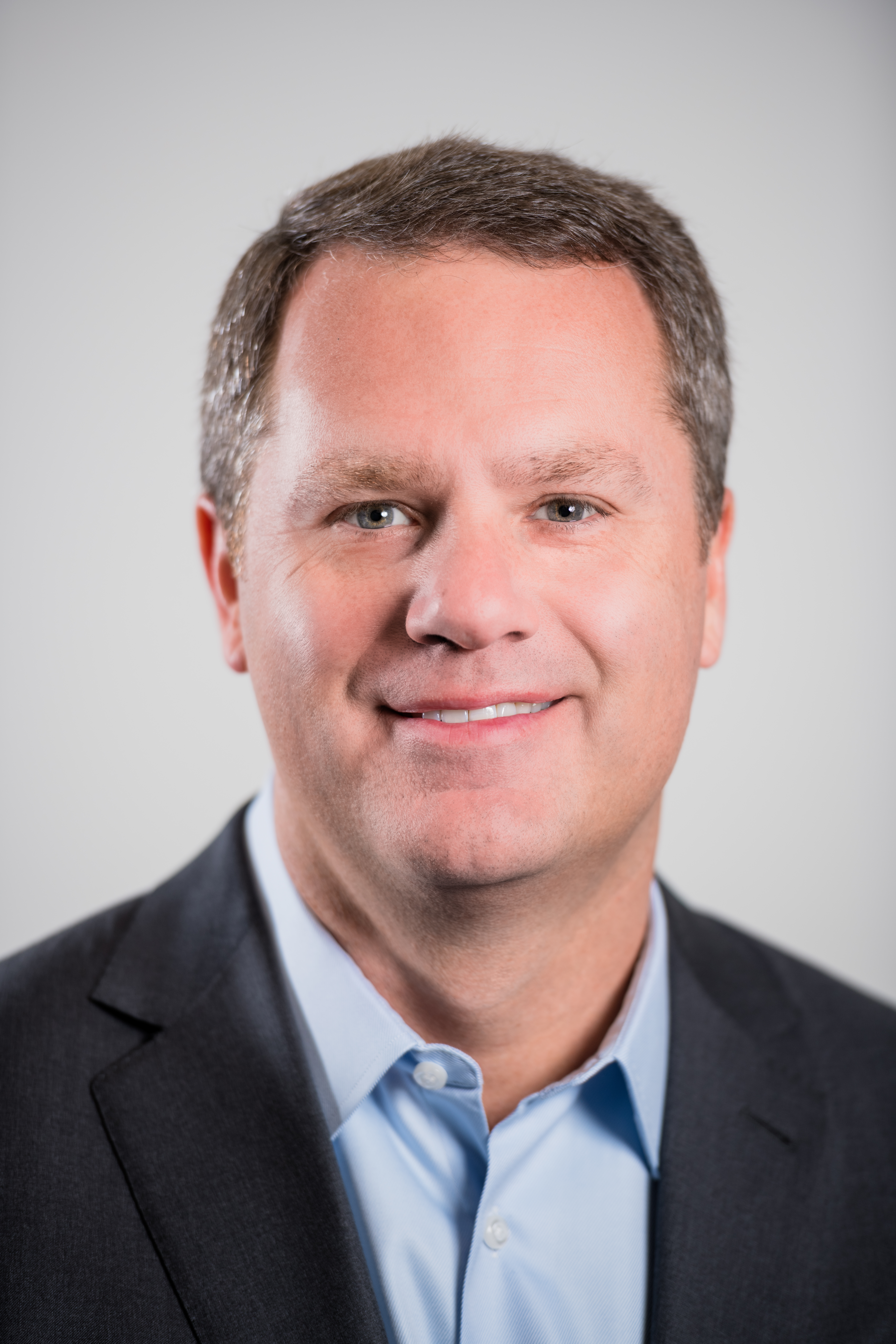
Doug McMillon, former president and CEO of Walmart Inc.

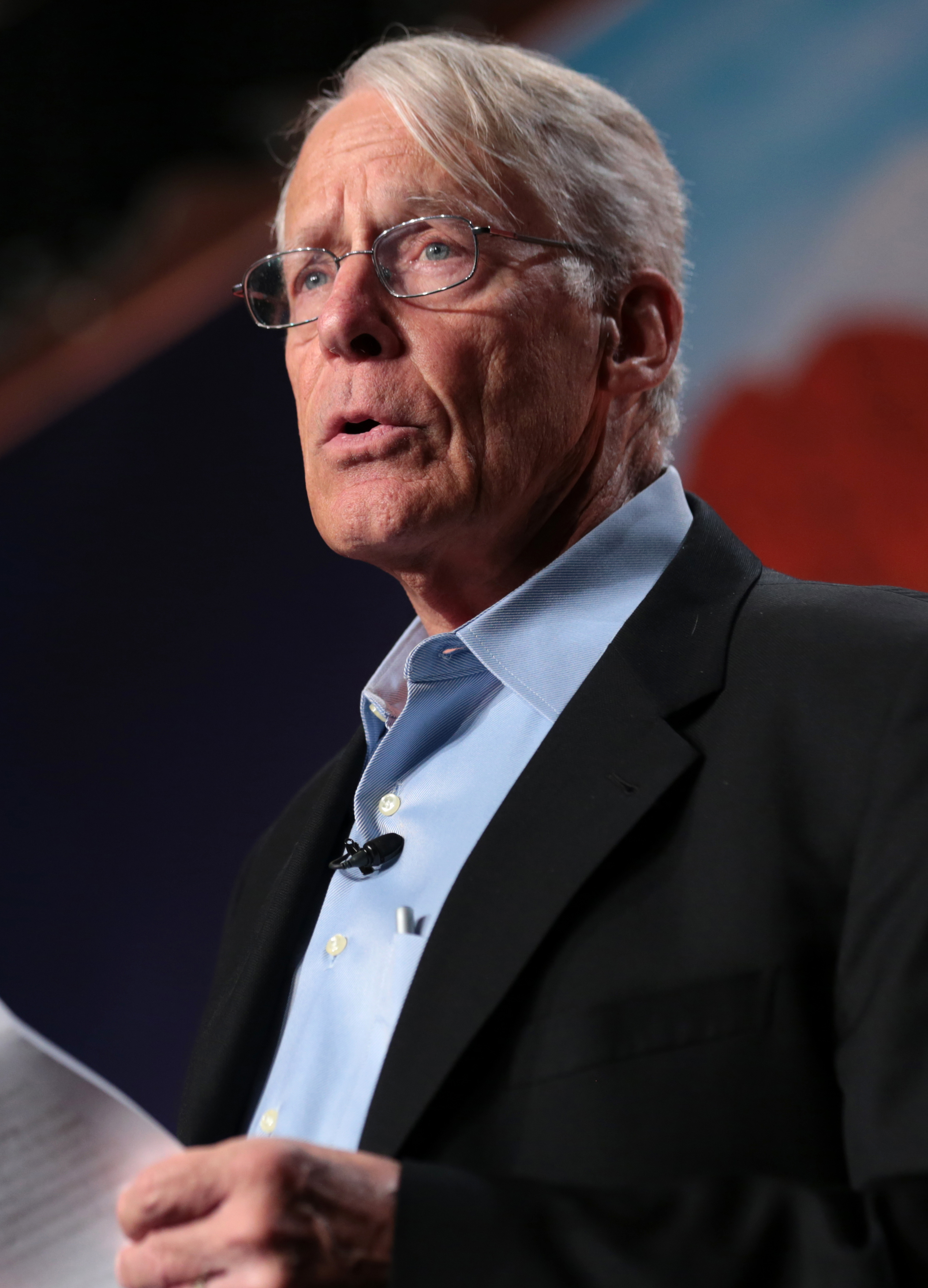
S. Robson Walton, former chairman of Walmart Inc.

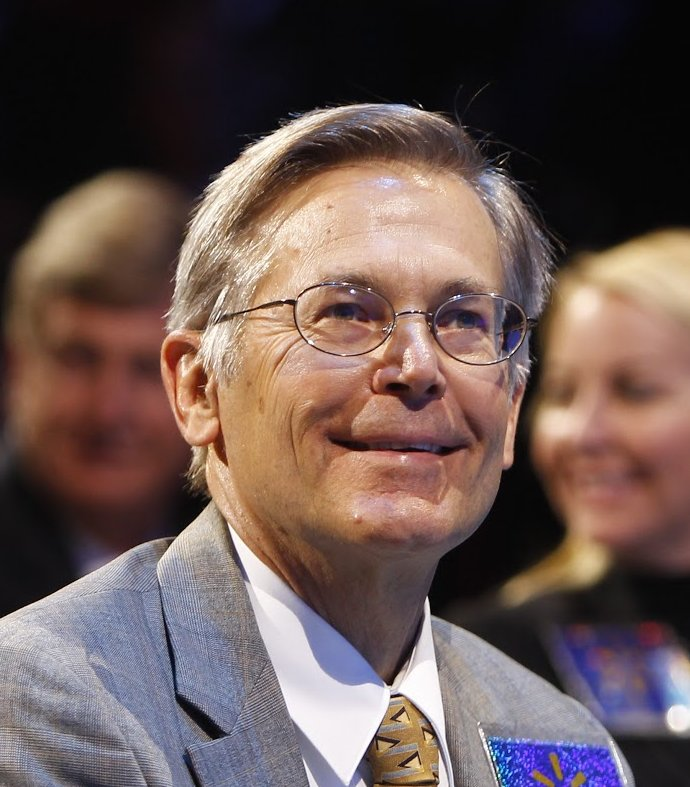
Jim Walton, chairman and CEO of Arvest Bank Group, Inc.

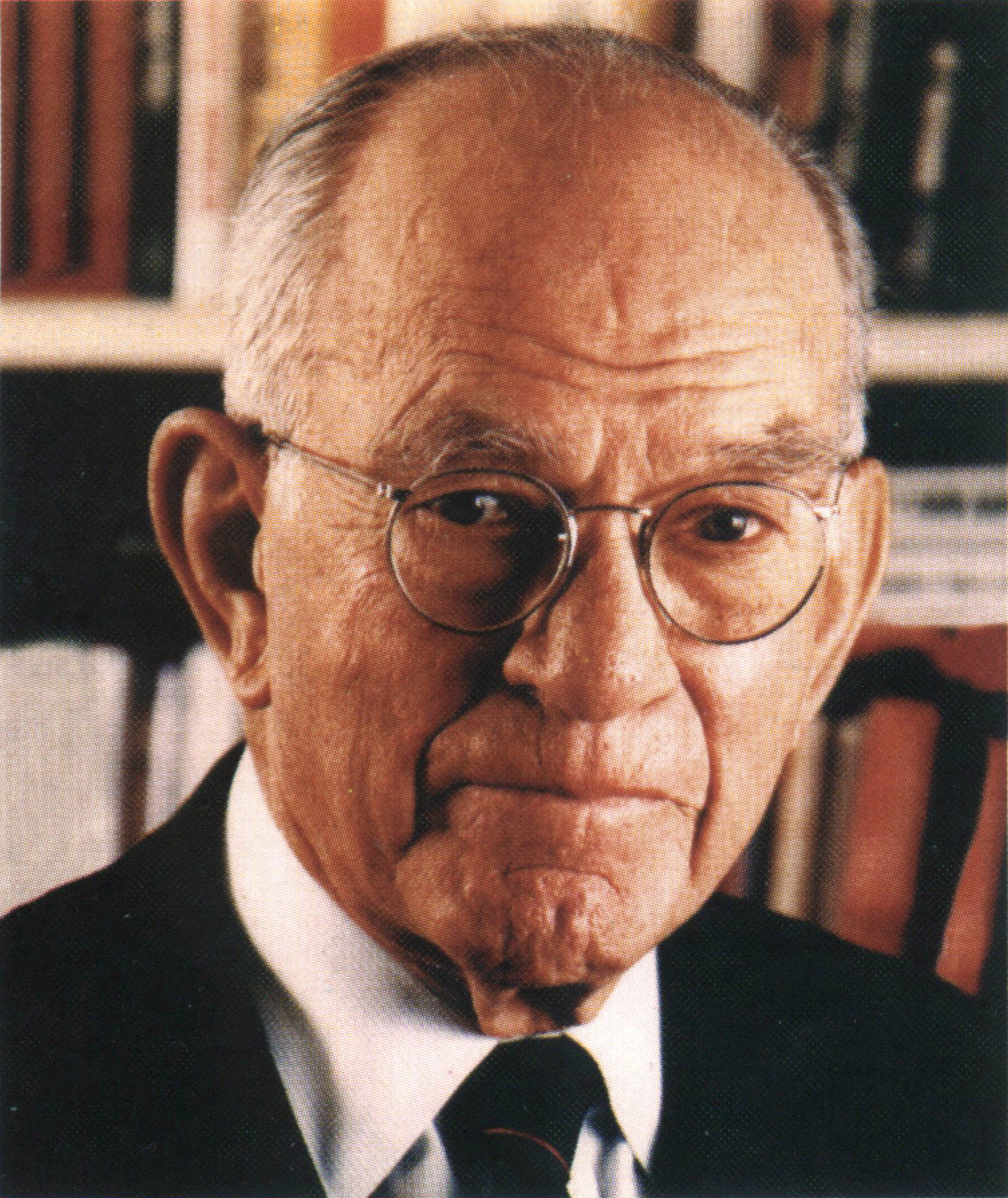
J. William Fulbright, US senator of Arkansas and namesake of Fulbright Program

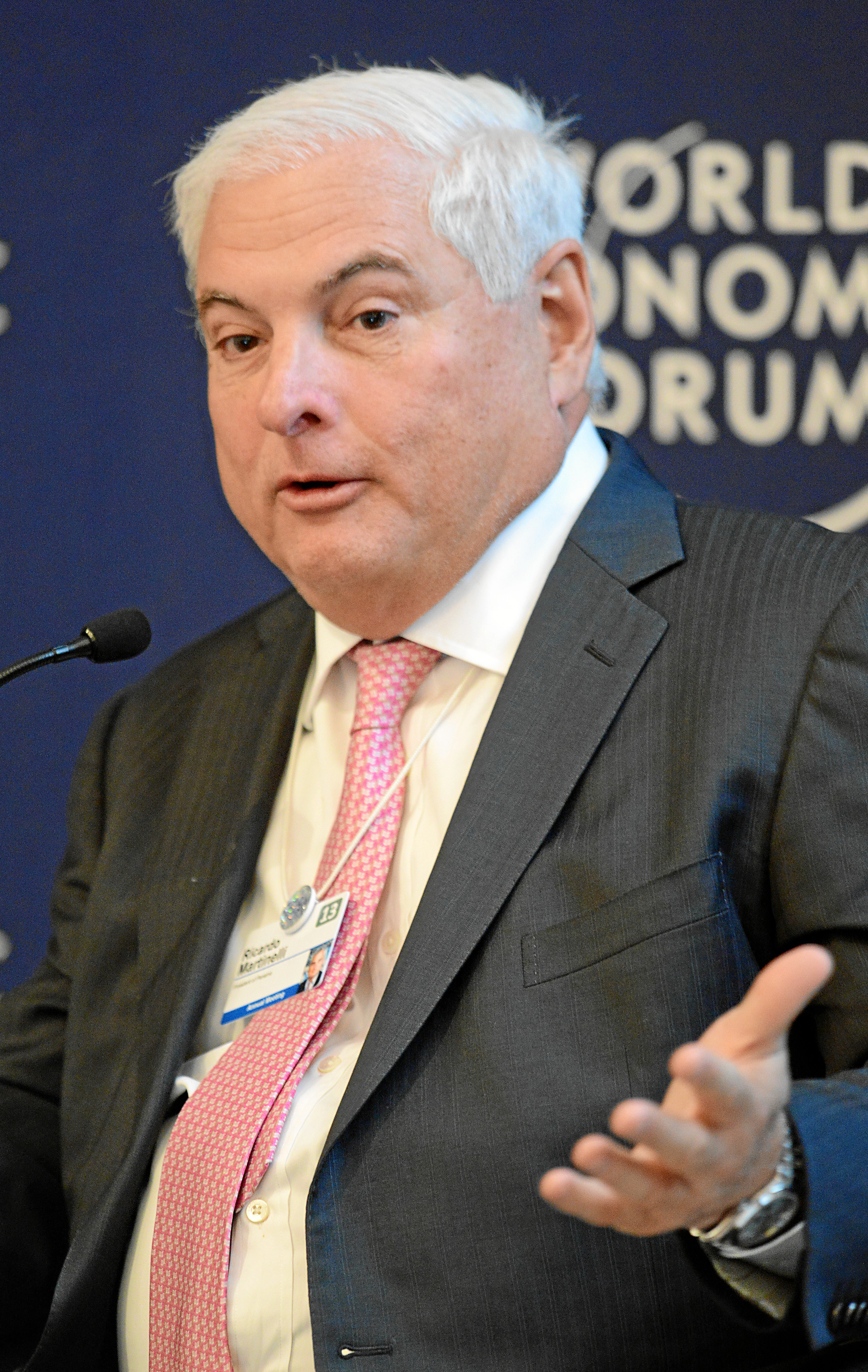
Ricardo Martinelli, 36th president of Panama

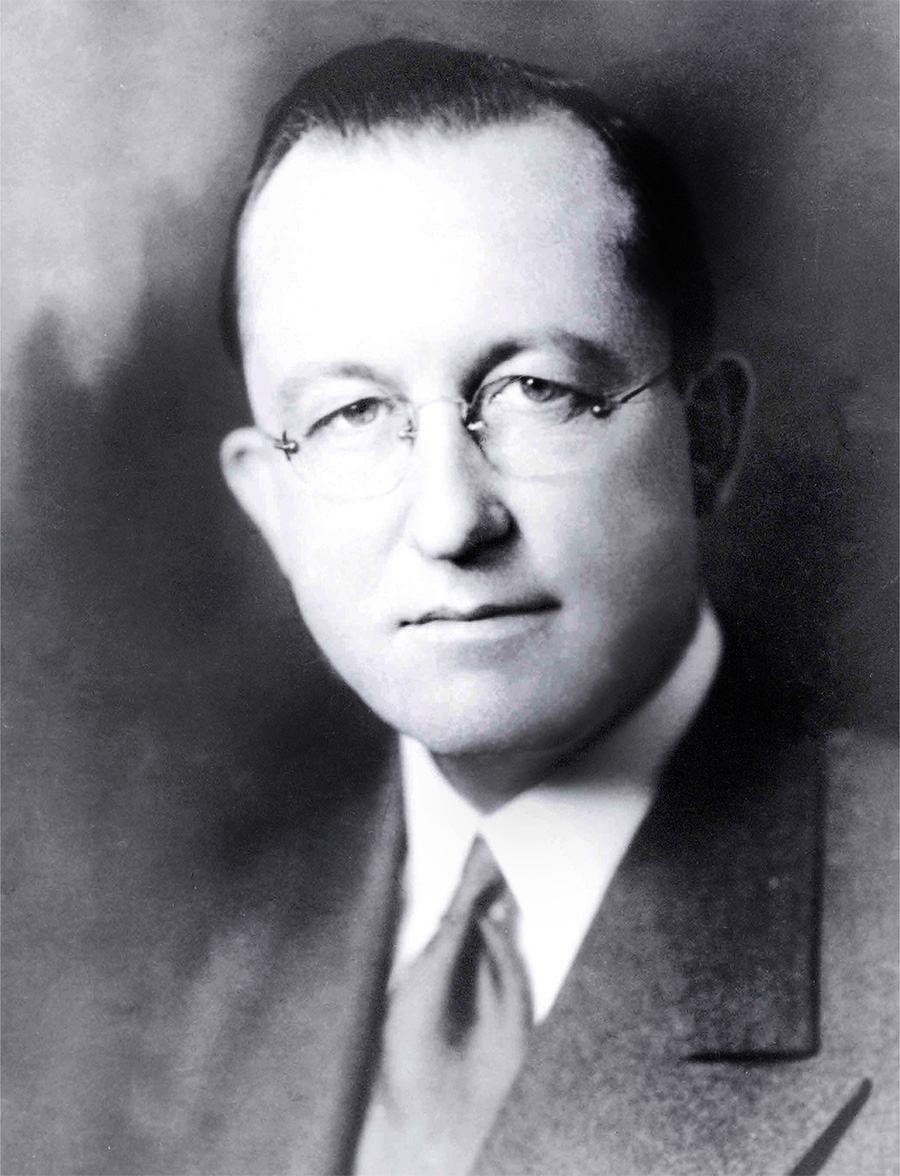
James O. McKinsey, founder of McKinsey & Company

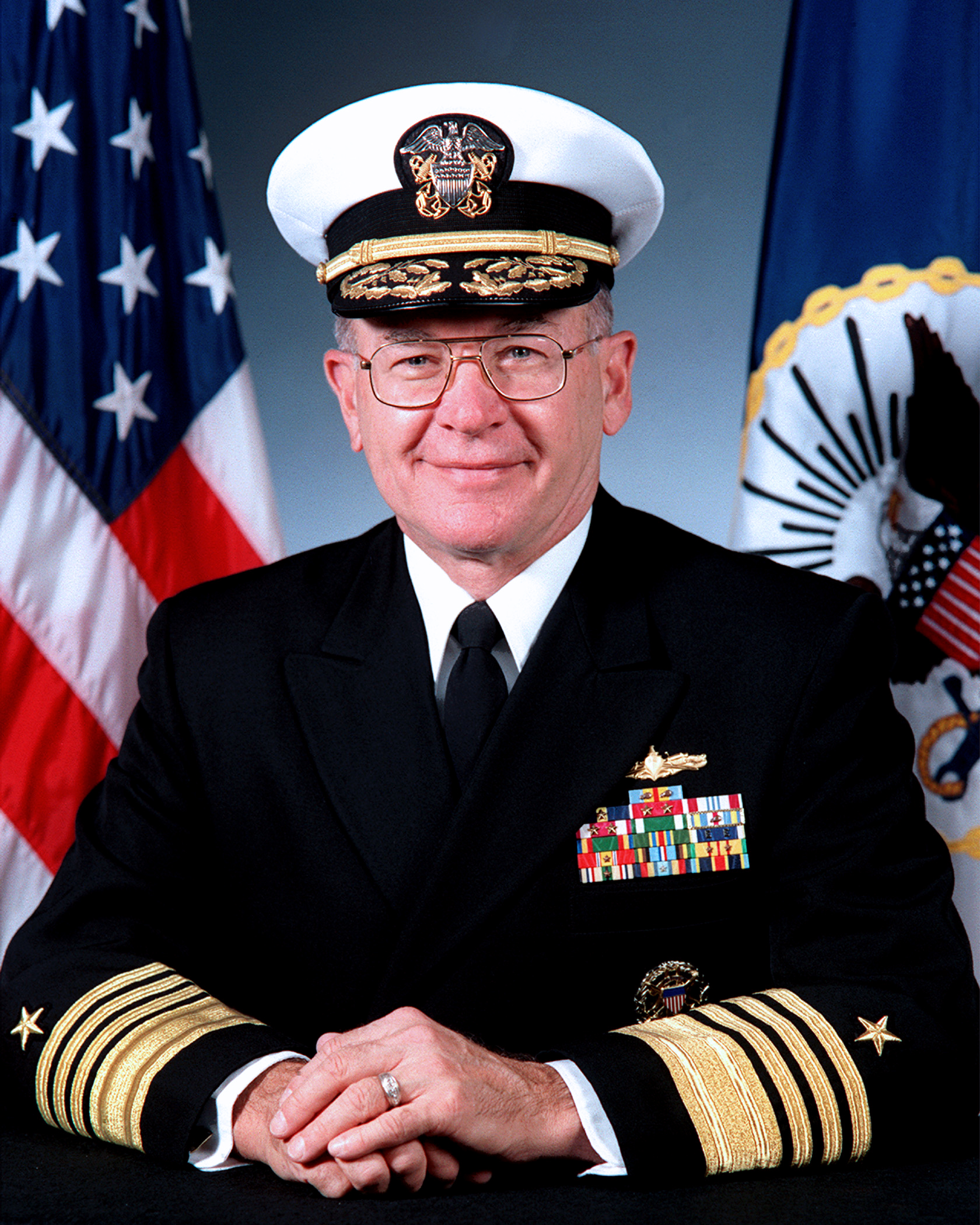
Vern Clark, 27th chief of Naval Operations

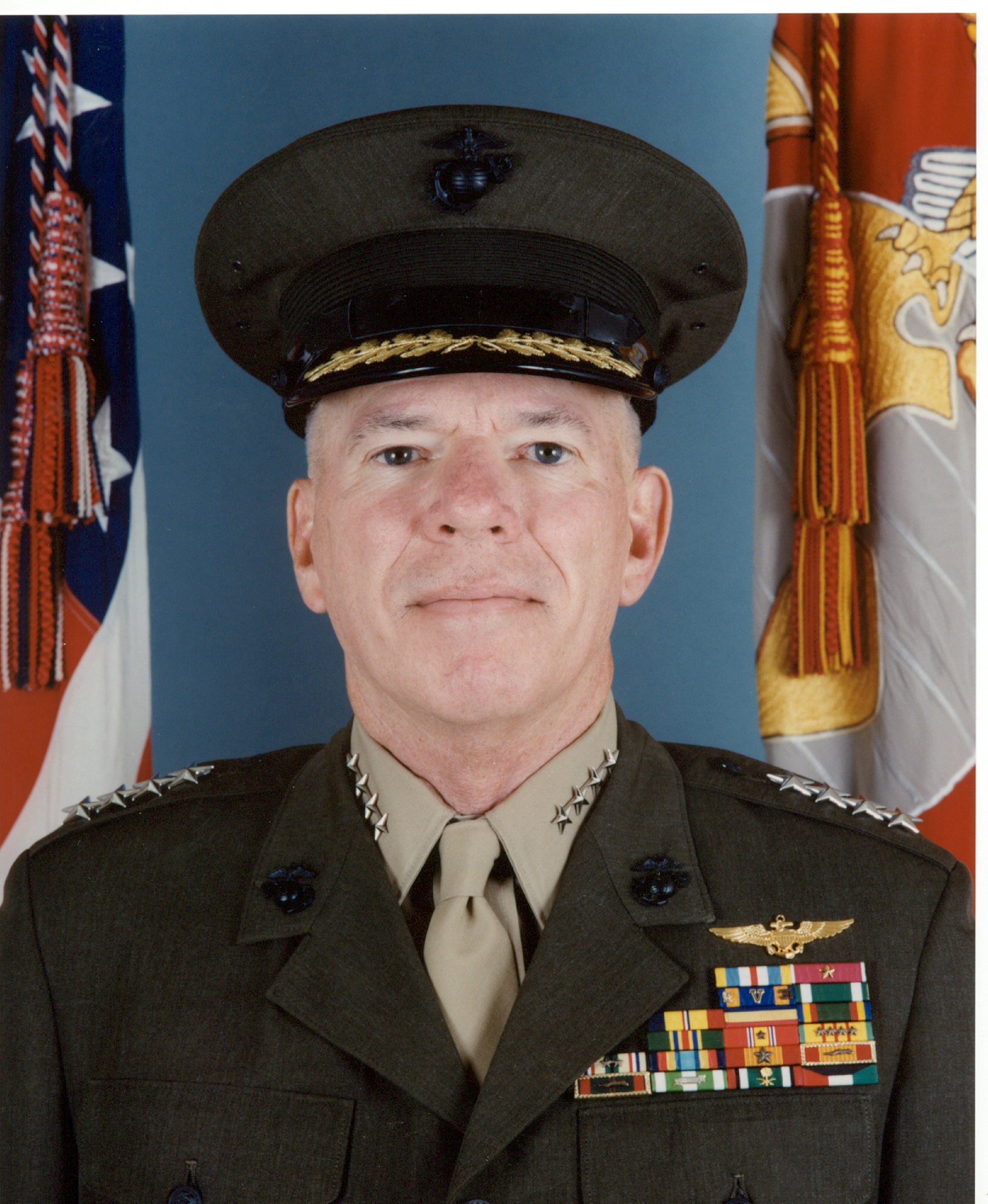
Terrence R. Dake, 27th assistant commandant of the Marine Corps

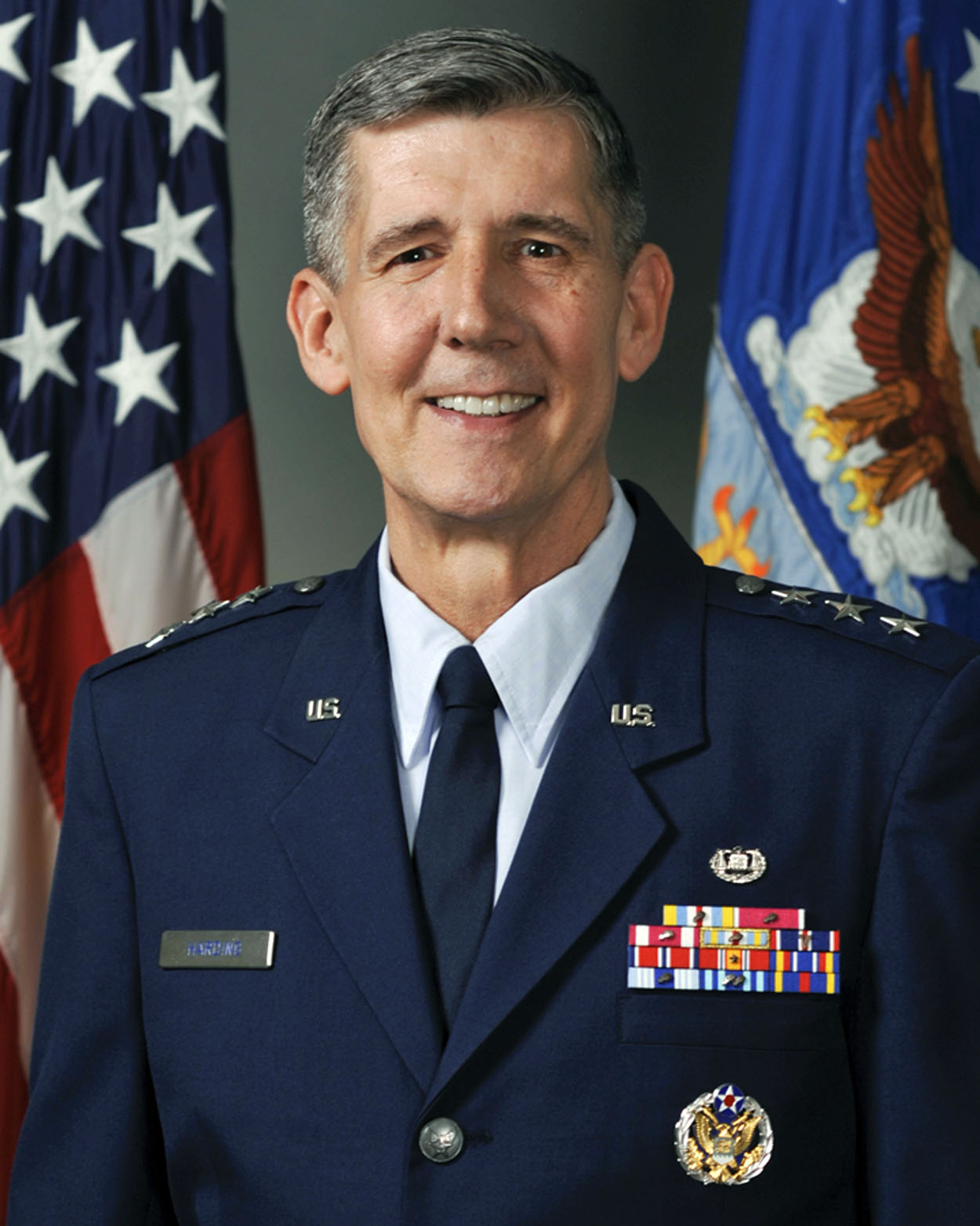
Richard C. Harding, 15th Judge Advocate General of the United States Air Force

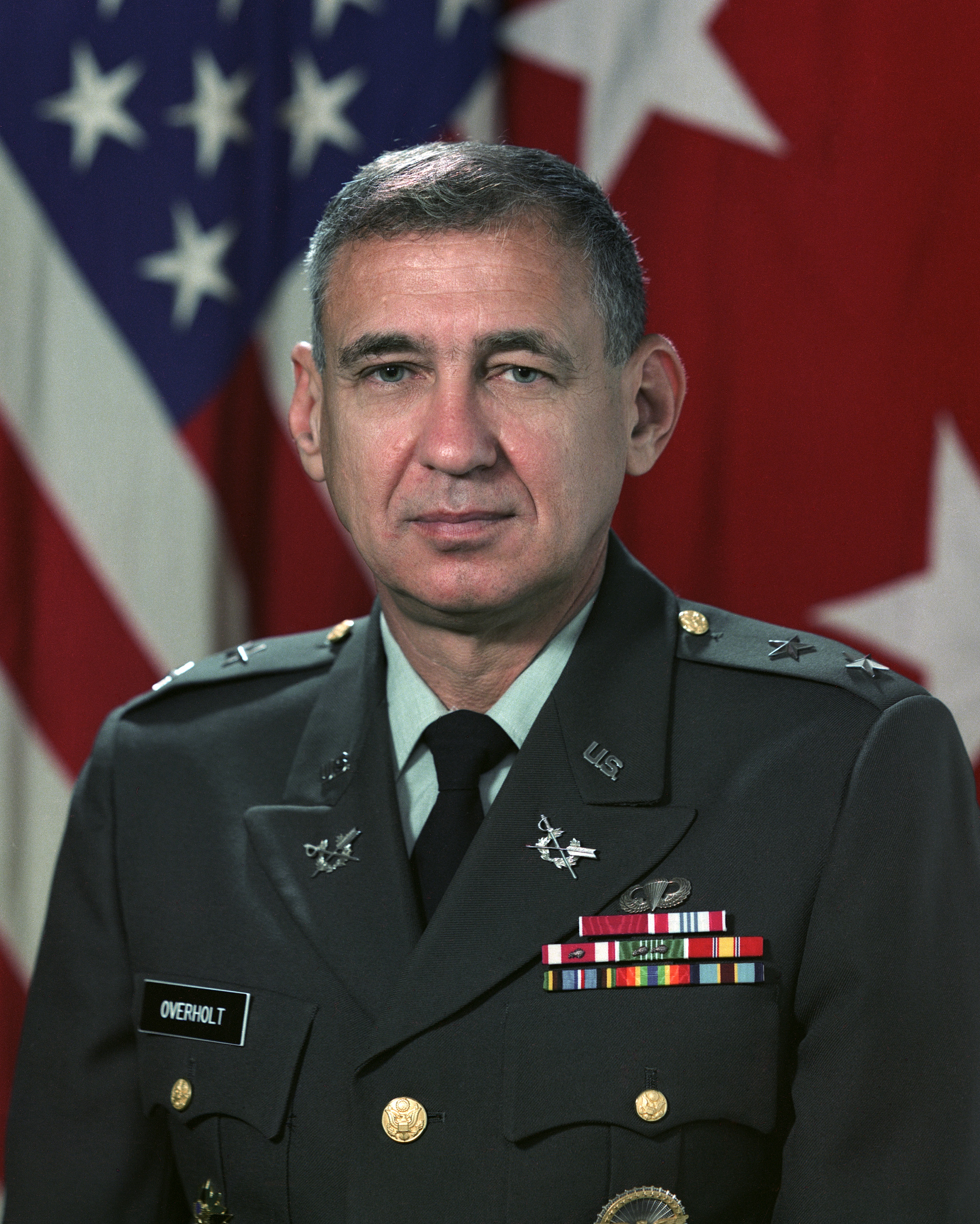
Hugh R. Overholt, 32nd Judge Advocate General of the United States Army

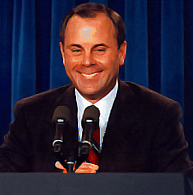
Mack McLarty, 17th White House chief of staff

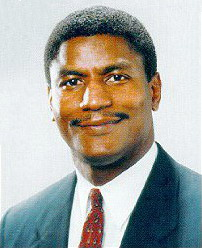
Rodney E. Slater, 13th United States secretary of transportation

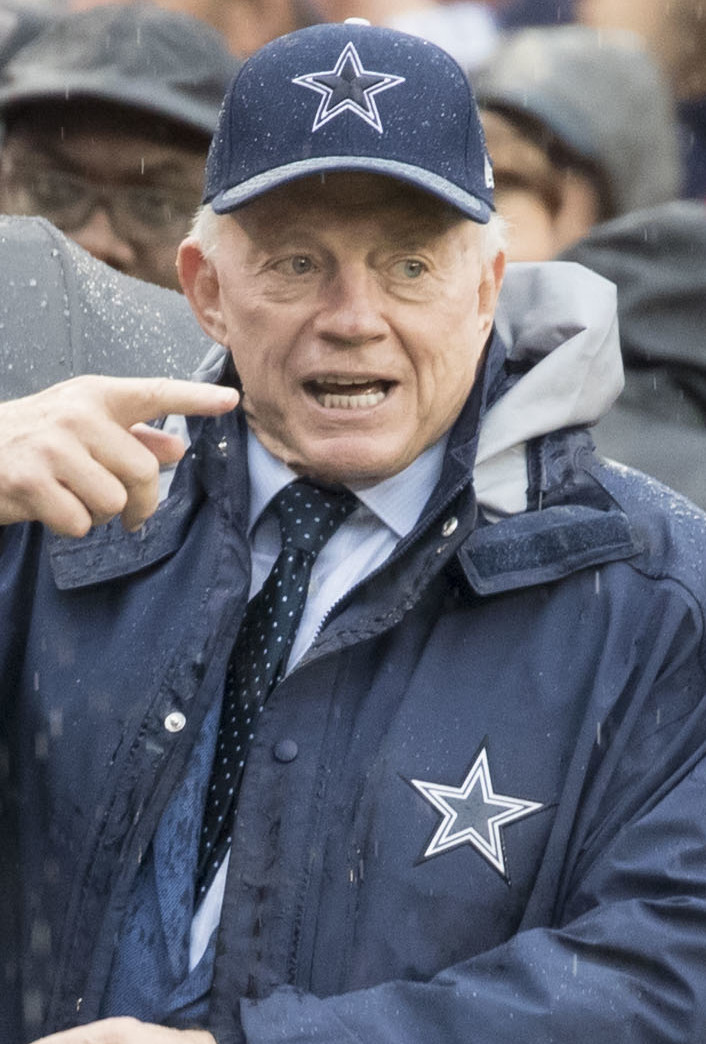
Jerry Jones, owner-president of Dallas Cowboys

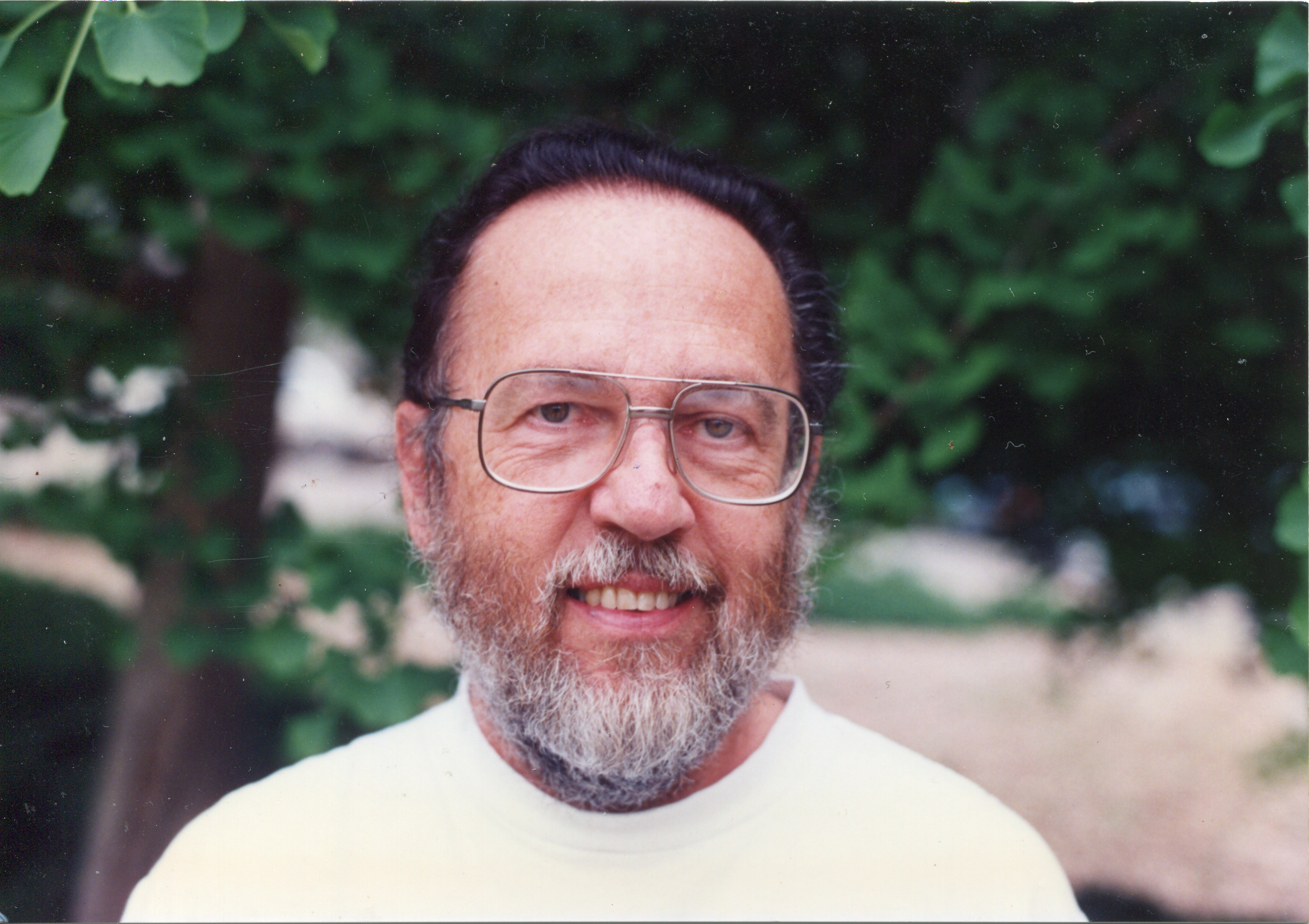
John R. Stallings, mathematician

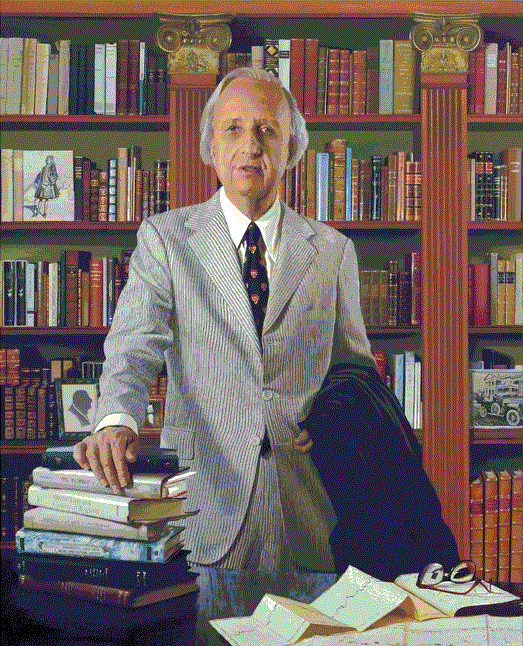
Morris S. Arnold, judge of the United States Foreign Intelligence Surveillance Court of Review

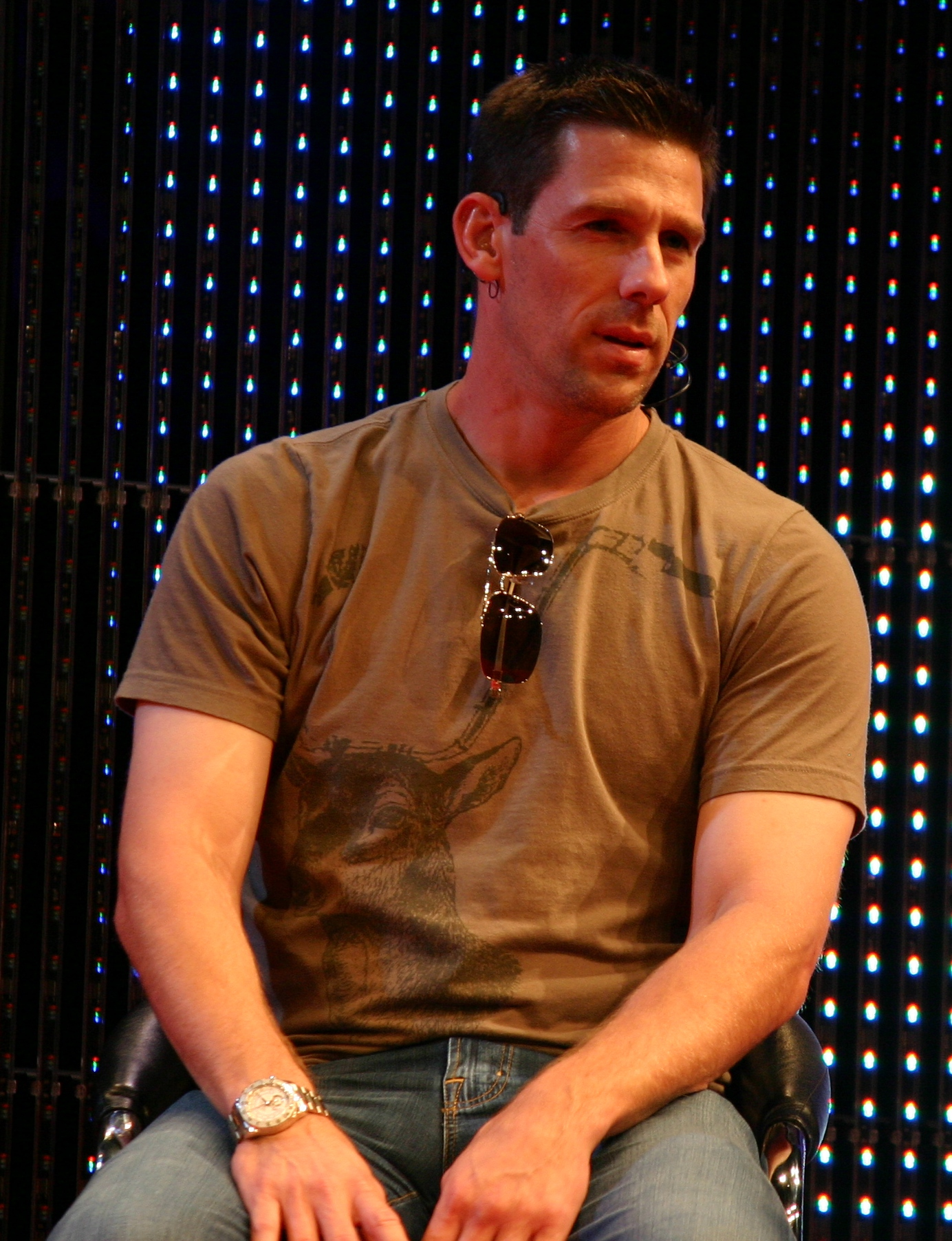
Cliff Lee, 4-time MLB all-star

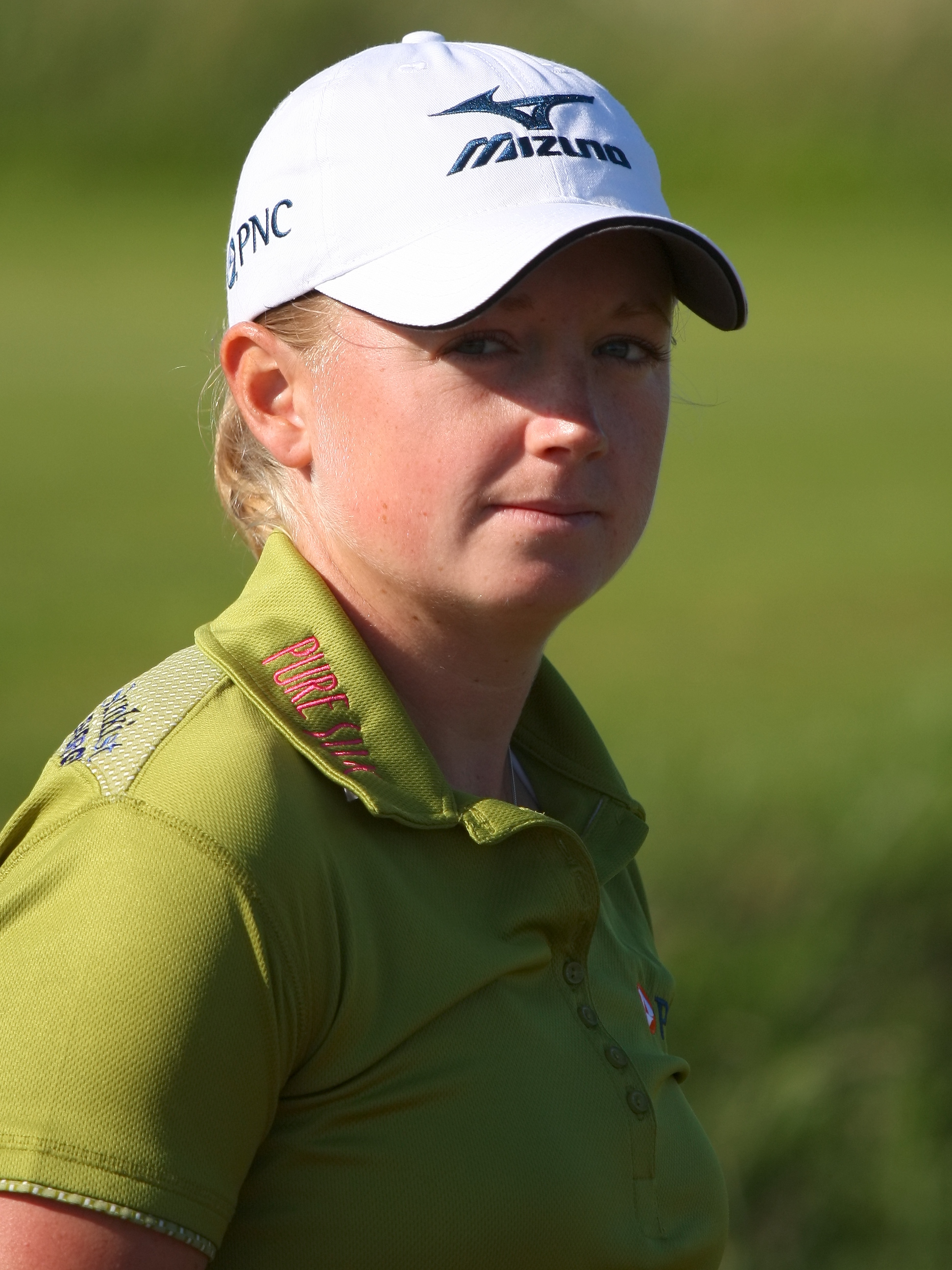
Stacy Lewis, LPGA 2-time major champion

Though neither attended the university, both President Bill Clinton and presidential nominee Hillary Clinton taught at the university's law school in the early 1970s. The house where they lived in Fayetteville is now a historic site and museum.

The University of Arkansas Alumni Association operates chapters in 30 states throughout the United States. Throughout the university's history, faculty, alumni, and former students have played prominent roles in many different fields. Among its Distinguished Alumni is Ricardo Martinelli, former president of the Republic of Panama from 2009 to 2014. Seventeen Arkansas graduates have held the position of governor, including the former Governor of Arkansas Asa Hutchinson. Twenty-six University of Arkansas graduates have represented the state of Arkansas in the United States House of Representatives, including at least one in every Congress from the start of the 57th Congress in 1901 to 2009. Six Arkansas graduates have held at least one US Senate seat from Arkansas since 1945. From 1979 to 2003, both seats were held by Arkansas graduates: the late J. William Fulbright and current US Senator John Boozman.

Arkansas alumni have also become prominent in the music world. Singer songwriter Ben Rector graduated in 2009.

Notable University of Arkansas faculty

Bill Clinton, 42nd President of the United States

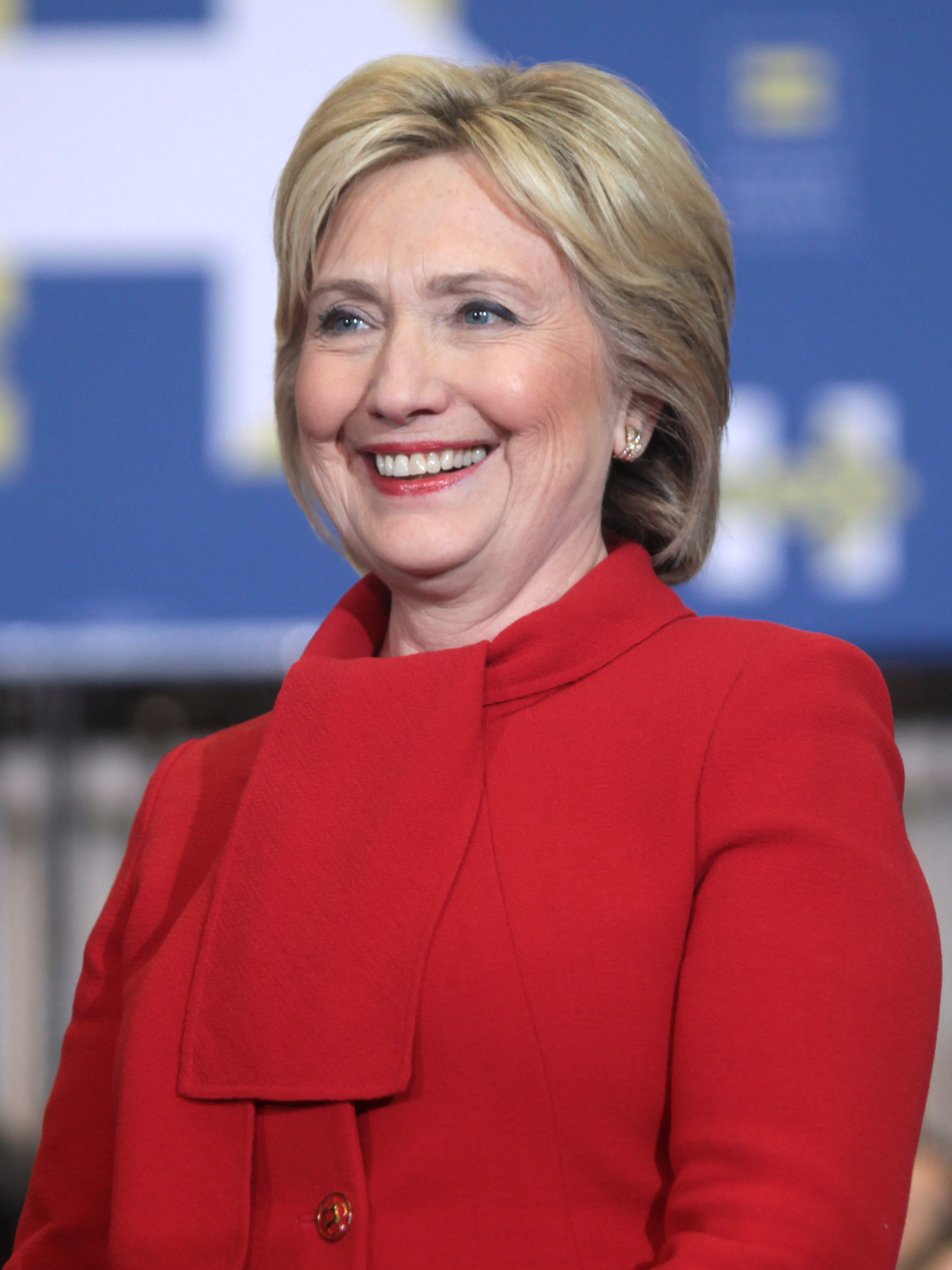
Hillary Clinton, 67th U.S. Secretary of State

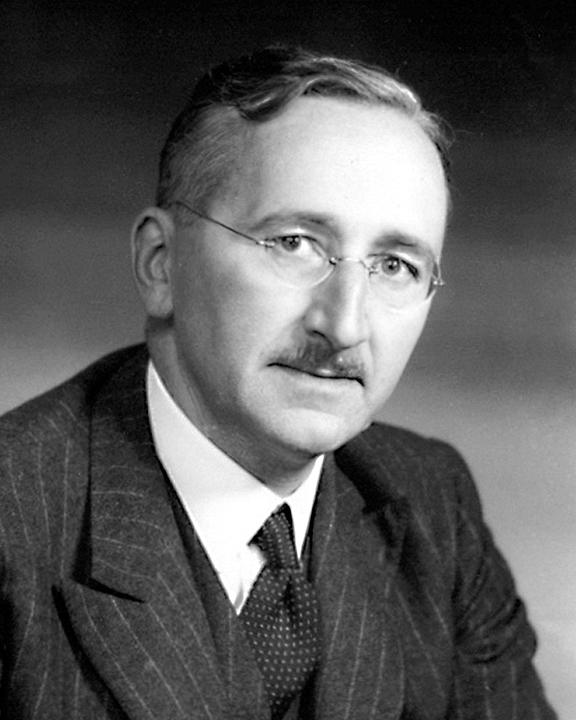
Friedrich Hayek, economist and philosopher

Arkansas alumni have made contributions to the business world and academia. These include Dallas Cowboys owner Jerry Jones. Other Arkansas business alumni include executives of major corporations like S. Robson Walton of Wal-Mart, Scott T. Ford of Alltel, and Ed Wilson of Fox Broadcasting Company & Tribune Broadcasting. Other Arkansas alumni have held chancellor and president positions at numerous universities, including John Tyler Caldwell, who served as the chancellor of North Carolina State University, and Ray Thornton, who served as president of Arkansas State University.

Arkansas alumni have also made contributions to professional sports. Arkansas Razorbacks have moved on to play in the NFL, NBA, WNBA, and MLB. Notable alumni in the world of sports include MLB Cy Young Award winning pitcher Cliff Lee and seven-time NBA All Star Joe Johnson. Others former Razorbacks include 10 Olympians who have won 14 Olympic medals including Mike Conley, Sr. who won Olympics medals at the 1984 and 1992 Olympics. Eight Pro Football Hall of Famers including Dan Hampton attended the University of Arkansas.

== Gallery ==
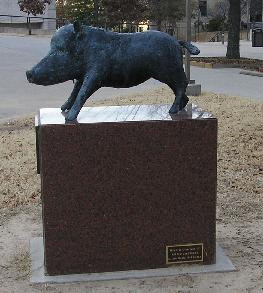
Bronze Razorback donated by Alpha Delta Pi sorority

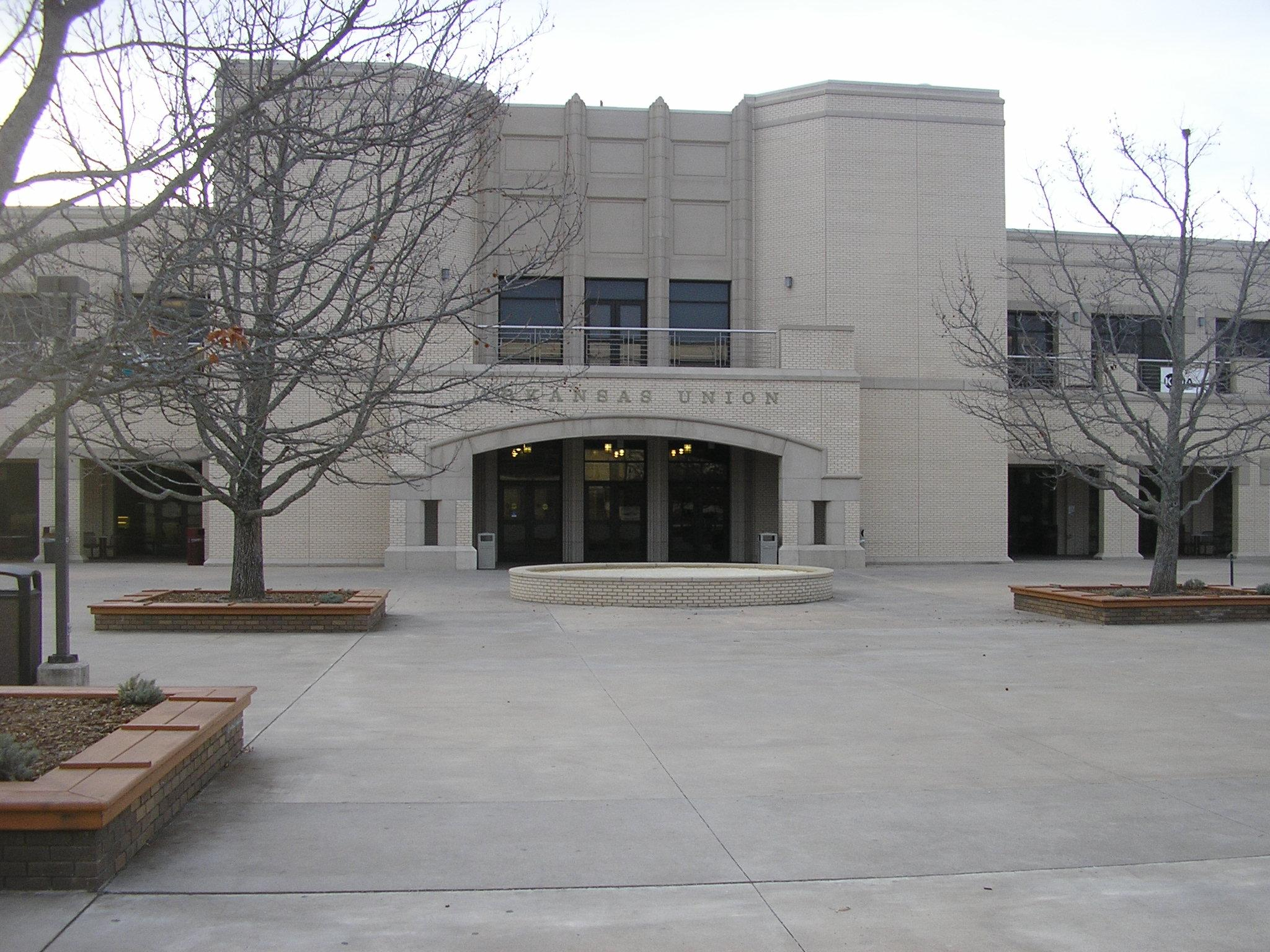
The Arkansas Union

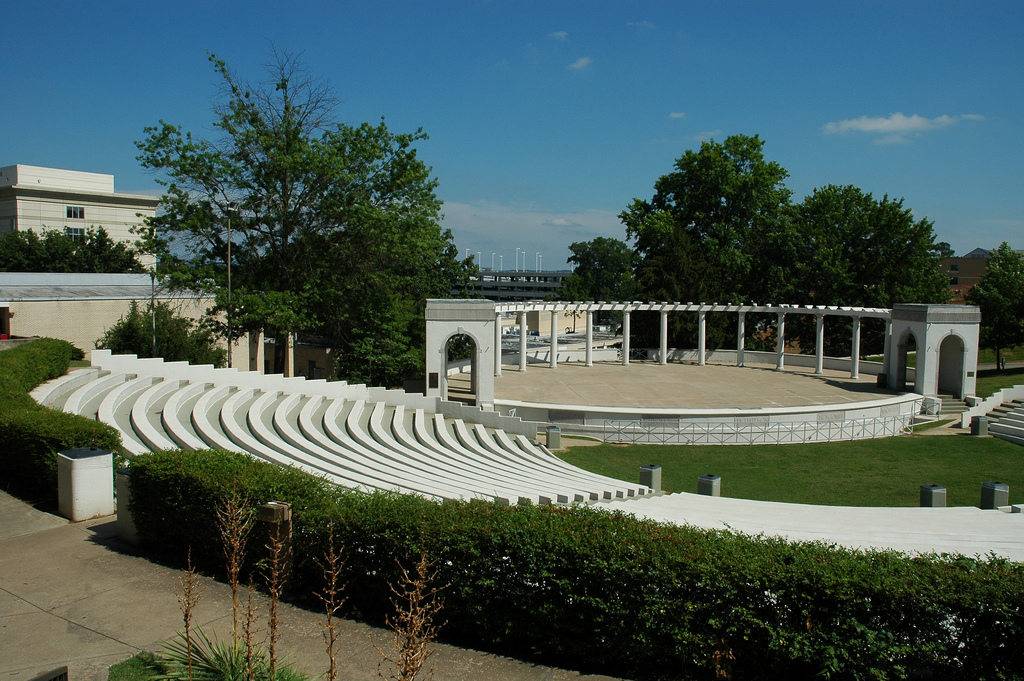
Chi Omega Greek Theater

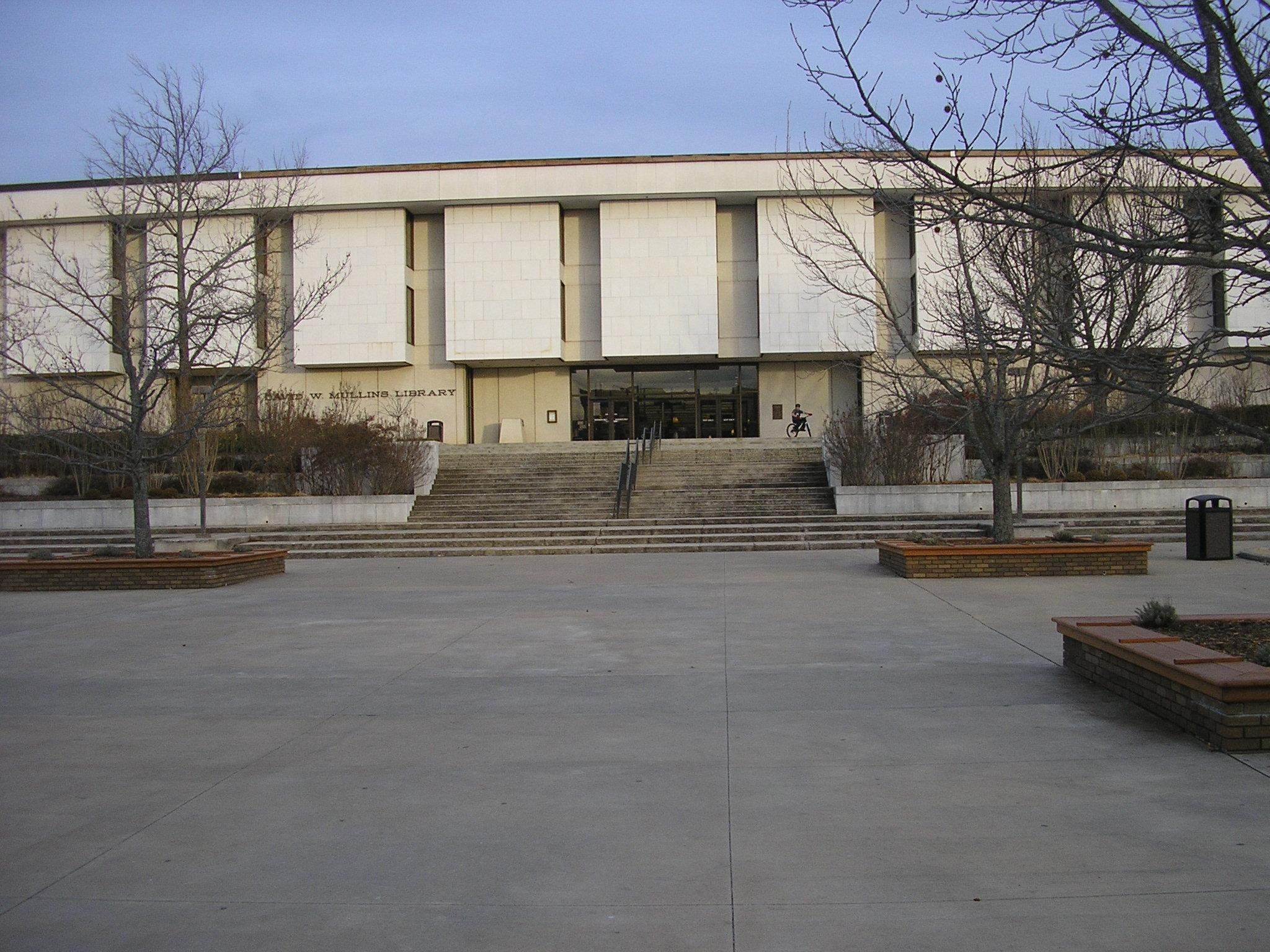
Mullins Library

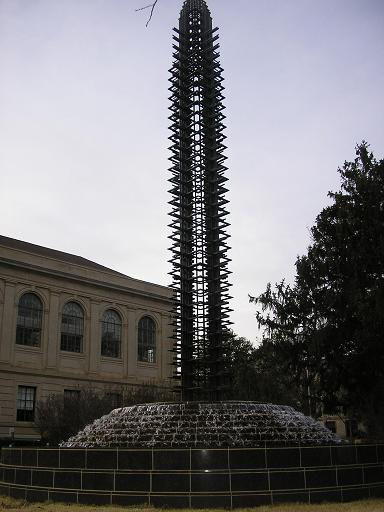
The Fulbright Peace Fountain

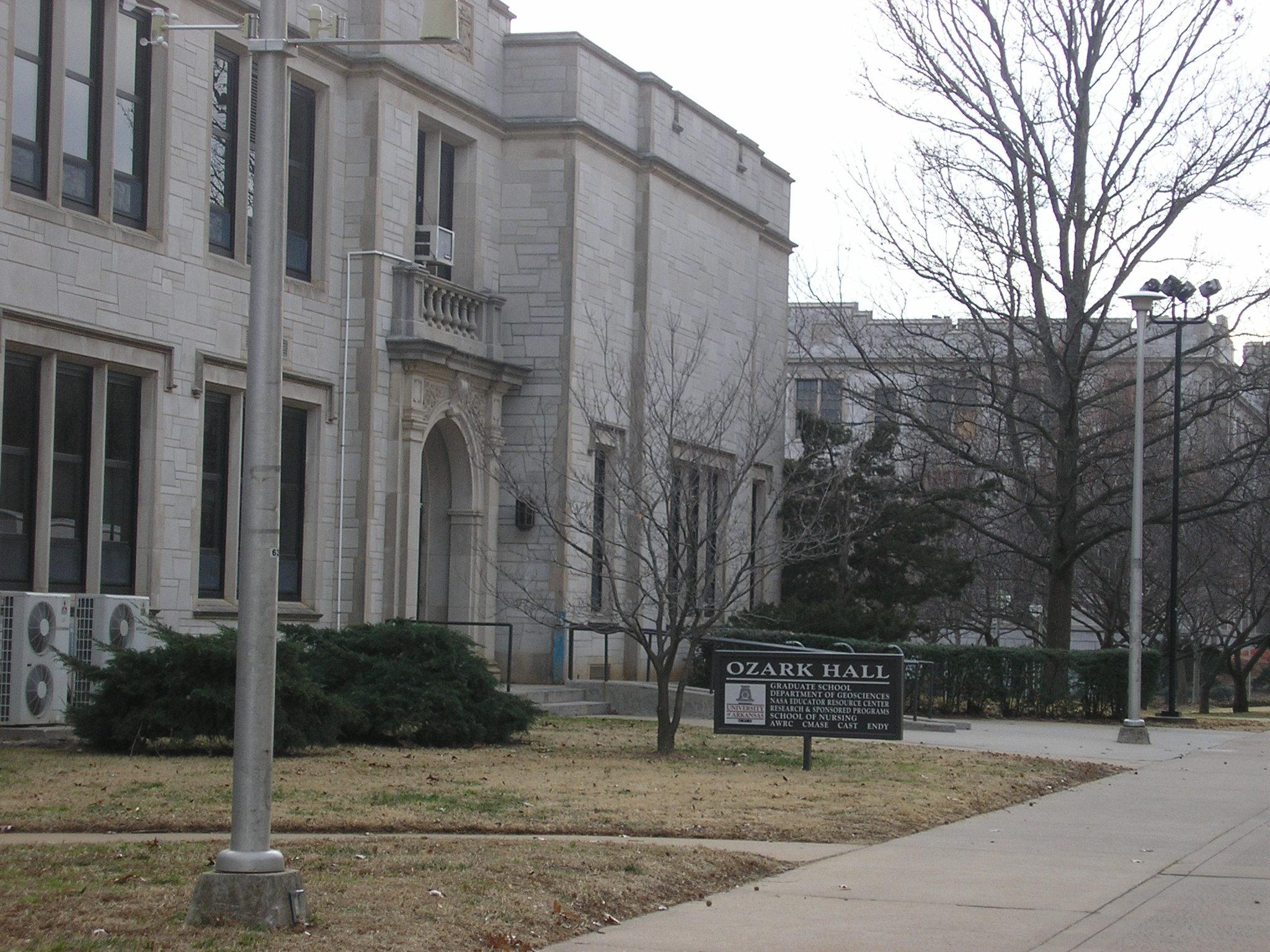
Gearhart Hall (formerly Ozark Hall)

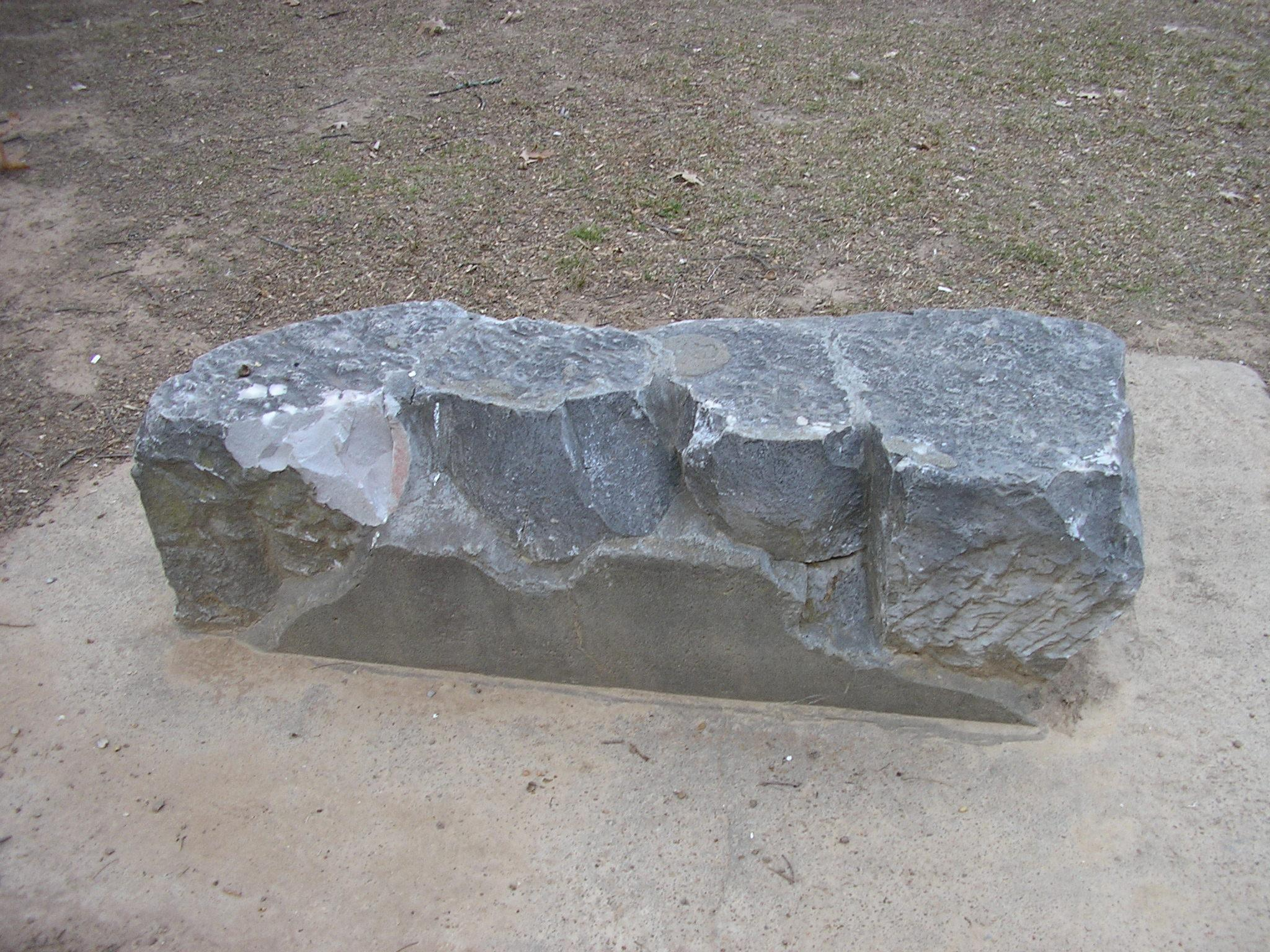
Spoofer's Stone

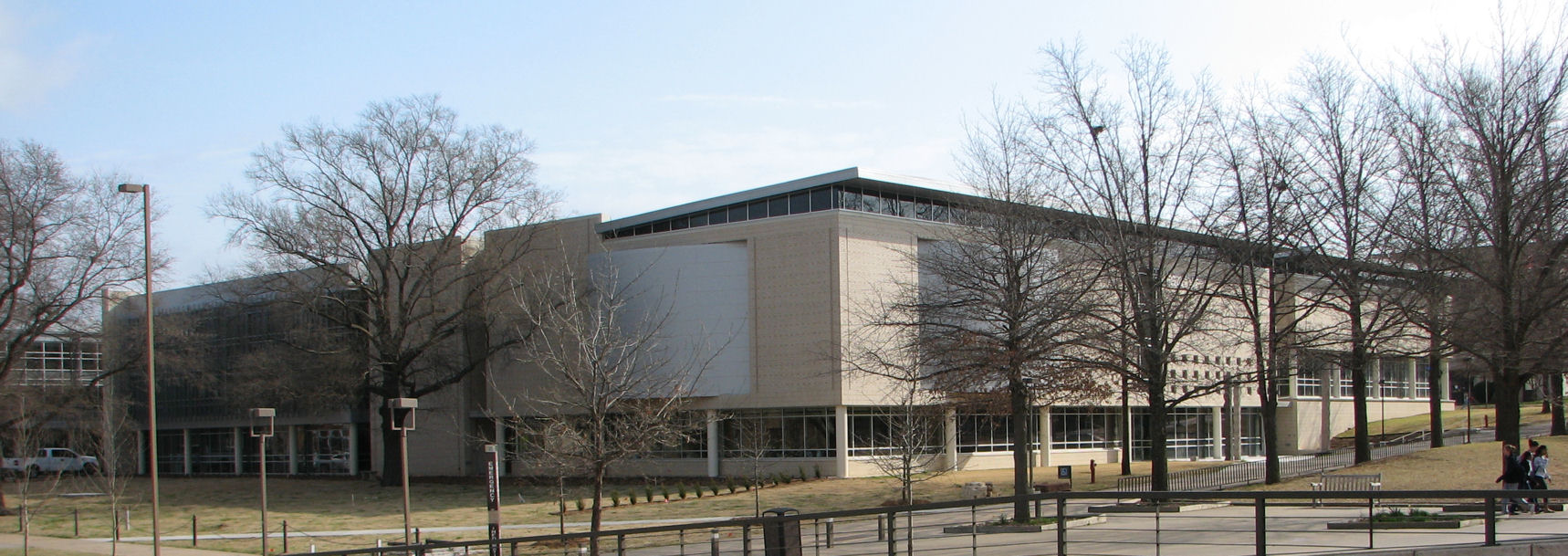
Leflar Law Center

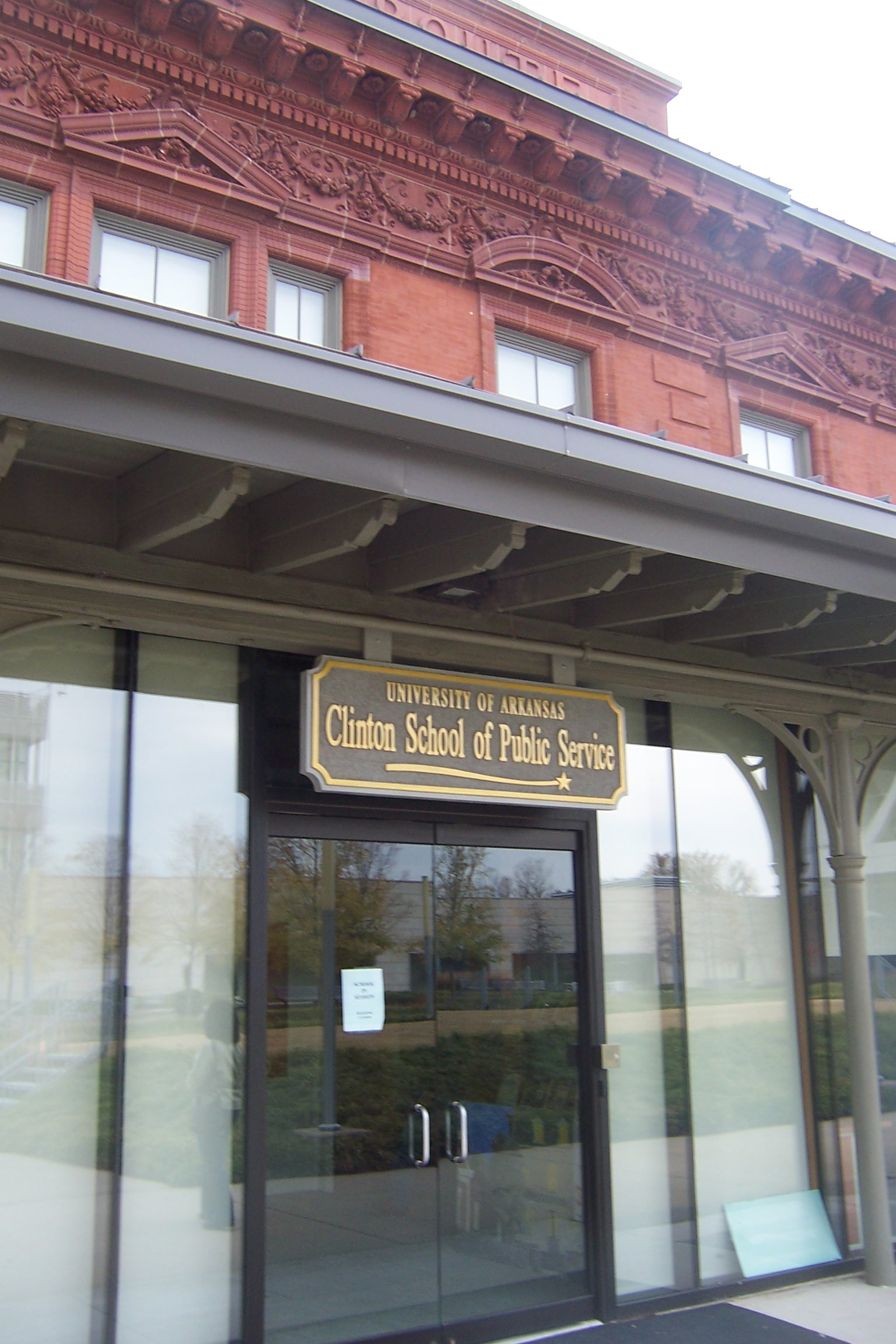
Clinton School of Public Service

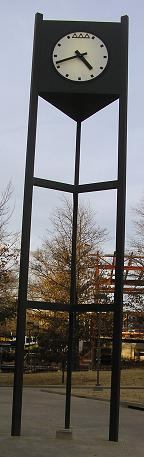
Tri Delta Clock

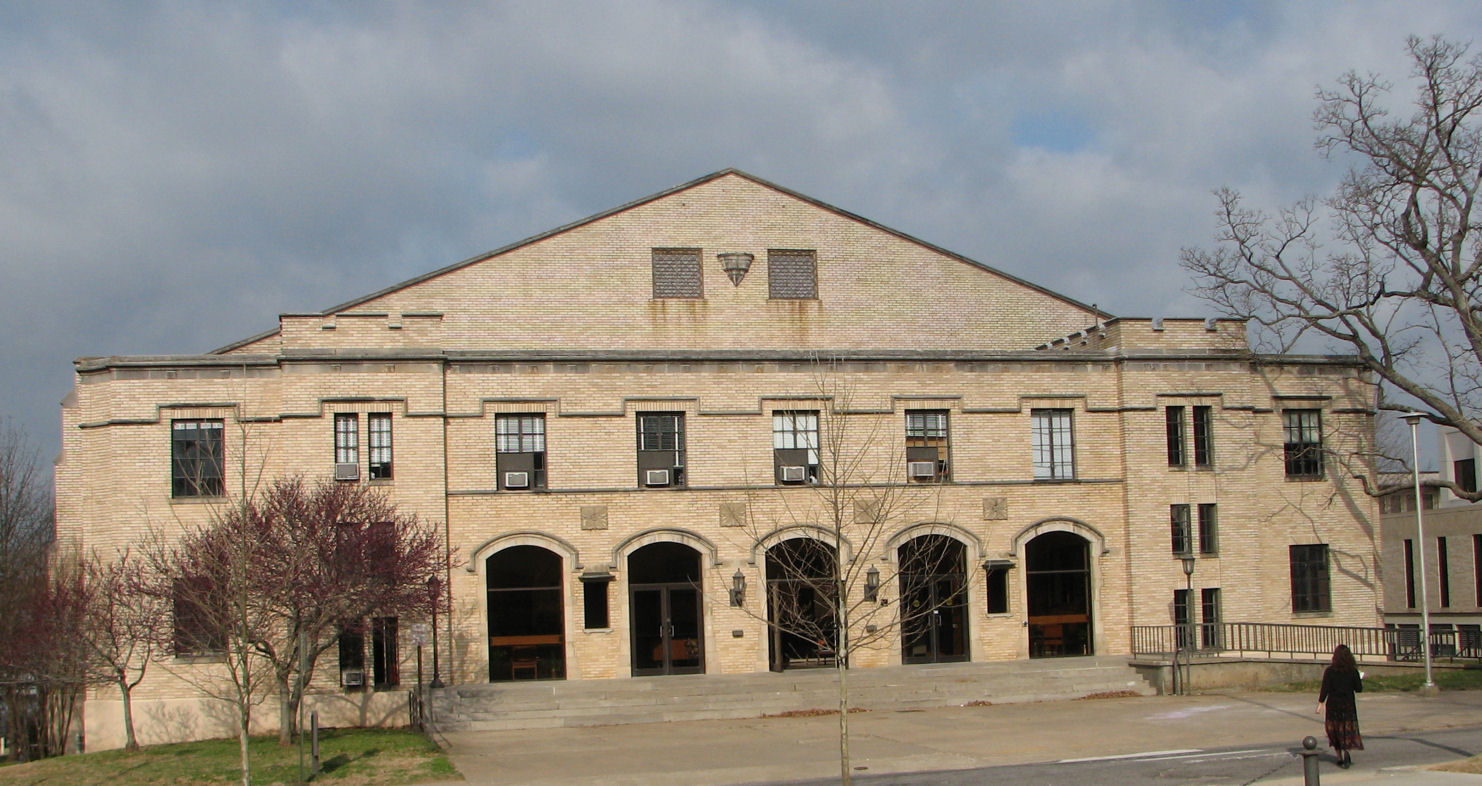
Faulkner Center for the Performing Arts

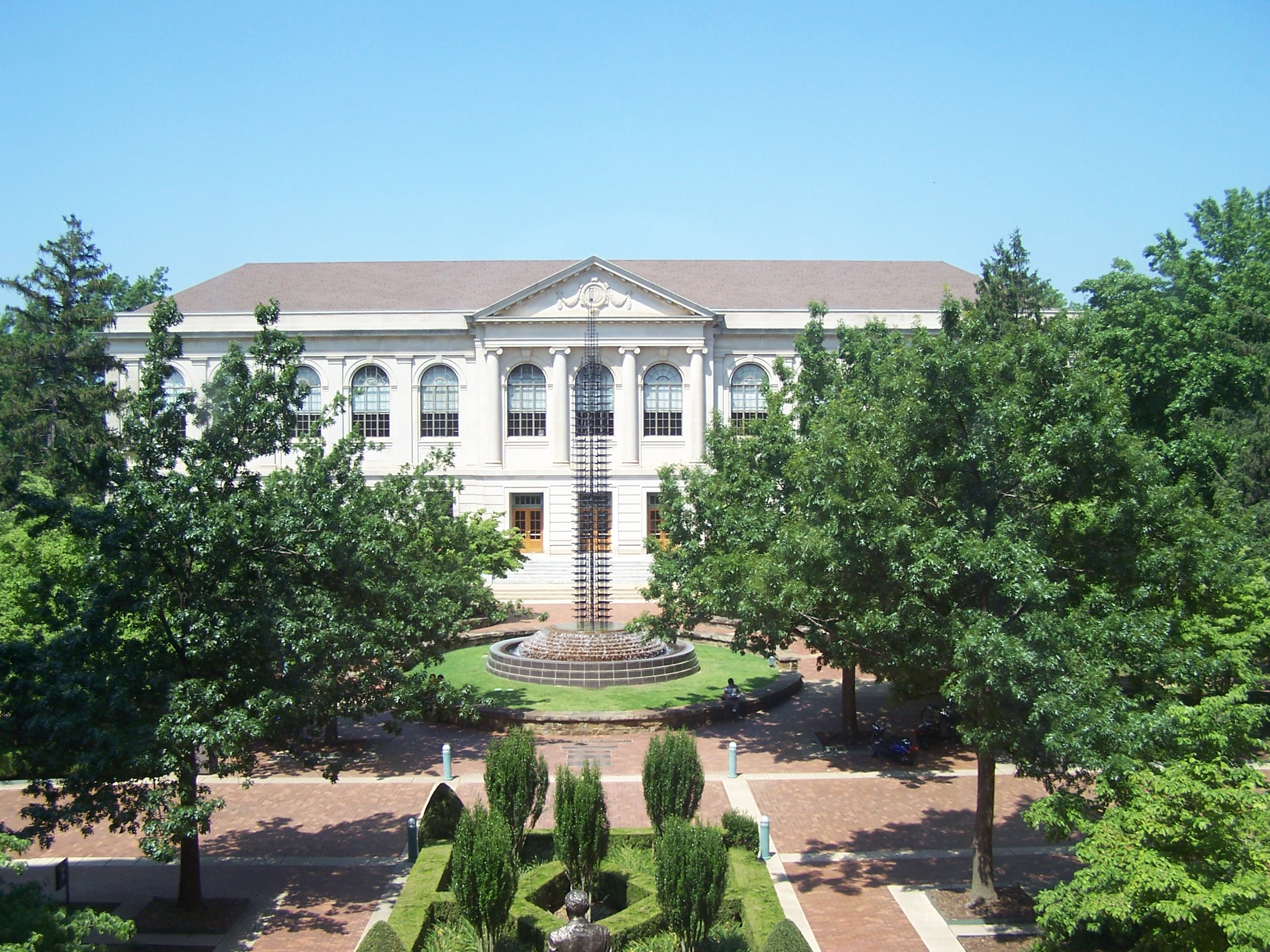
Vol Walker Hall

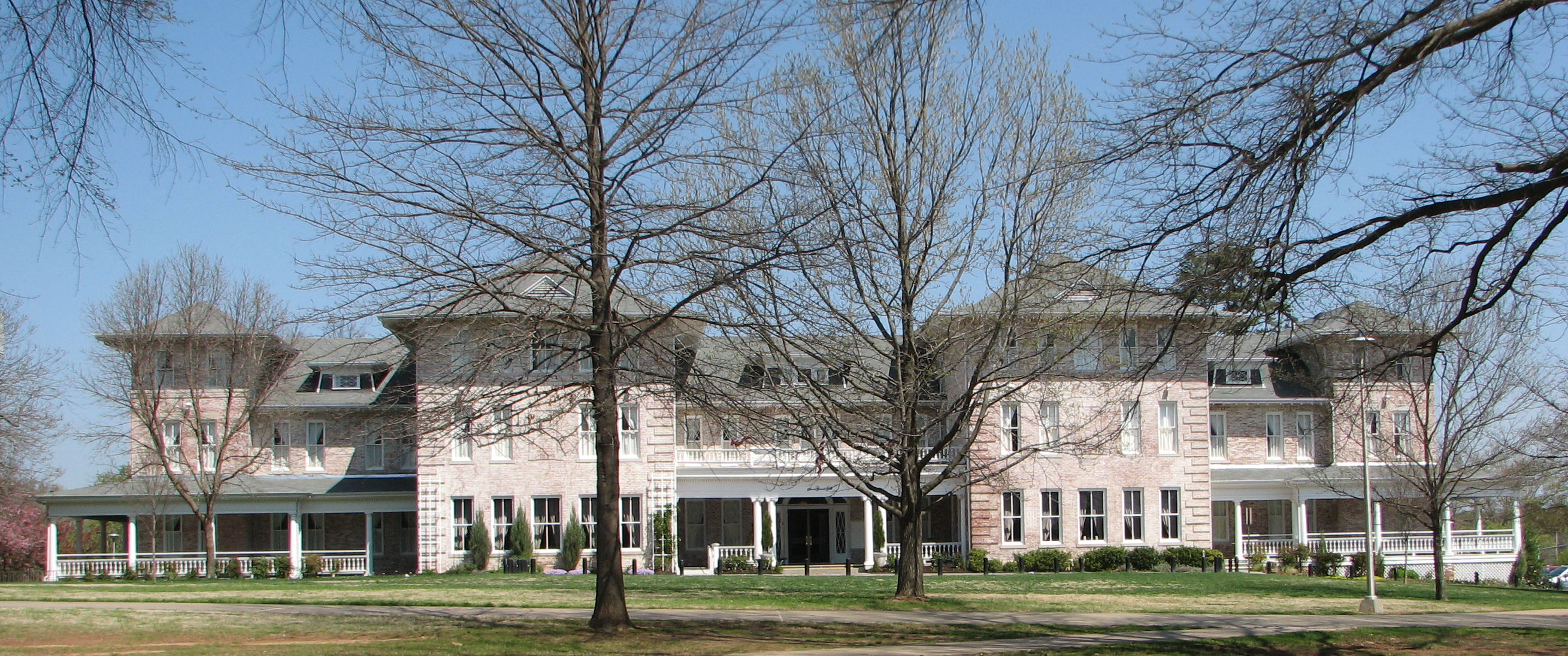
Carnall Hall

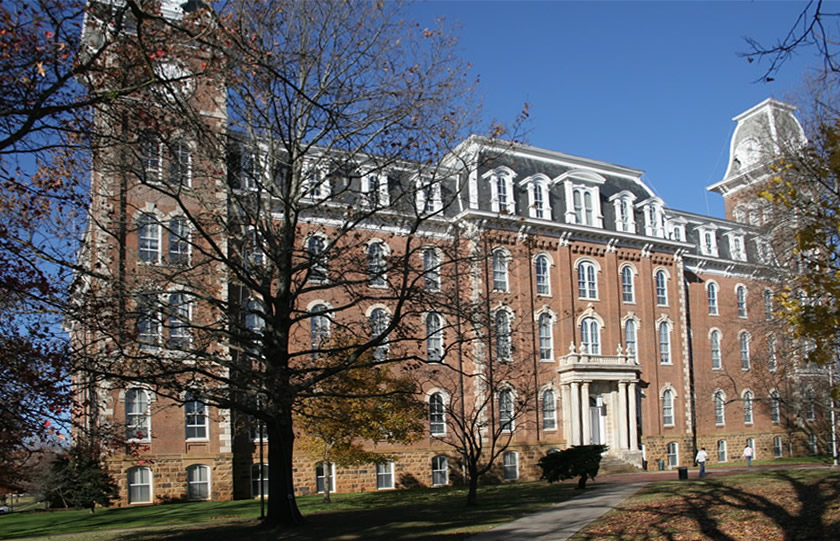
Old Main, original building at UA

== See also ==
- List of forestry universities and colleges
- 2000 University of Arkansas shooting
