= University of Arkansas Campus Historic District =

Historic district in Arkansas, United States

- U.S. National Register of Historic Places
- U.S. Historic district
- Location within Arkansas Location within the United States
- Location: Roughly bounded by Garland Ave., Maple St., Arkansas Ave. & Dickson St., Fayetteville, Arkansas
- Coordinates: 36°04′05″N 94°10′19″W
- Area: 71 acres (29 ha)
- NRHP reference No.: 09000745
- Added to NRHP: September 23, 2009

The University of Arkansas Campus Historic District is a historic district that was listed on the National Register of Historic Places on September 23, 2009. The district covers the historic core of the University of Arkansas campus, including 25 buildings.

The district was added to the National Register of Historic Places (NRHP) on September 23, 2009, and the listing was announced as the featured listing in the National Park Service's weekly list of October 2, 2009. The Inn at Carnall Hall is a member of Historic Hotels of America, the official program of the National Trust for Historic Preservation.

The historical core of campus was built in many phases, coincident with when funding was available to build. Beginning with the construction of Old Main in 1879, buildings were built haphazardly around campus. This was changed when the architecture firm Jamieson & Spearl designed the 1925 master plan, which includes many of the Collegiate Gothic style buildings (such as the Agriculture Building). The plan allowed for more structure and a better layout. However, funding ran dry and the master plan came to a halt. Building resumed following many Public Works Administration grants after World War II.

One feature of the campus is Campus Walk. Formerly a through street, Campus Drive was converted to a footpath that runs from Maple Street on the north, through the Pi Beta Phi Memorial Gate, and follows the street's path across the campus core and through the Bell Engineering Center to the street's former intersection with Dickson Street.

== Listings ==
=== Old Main ===
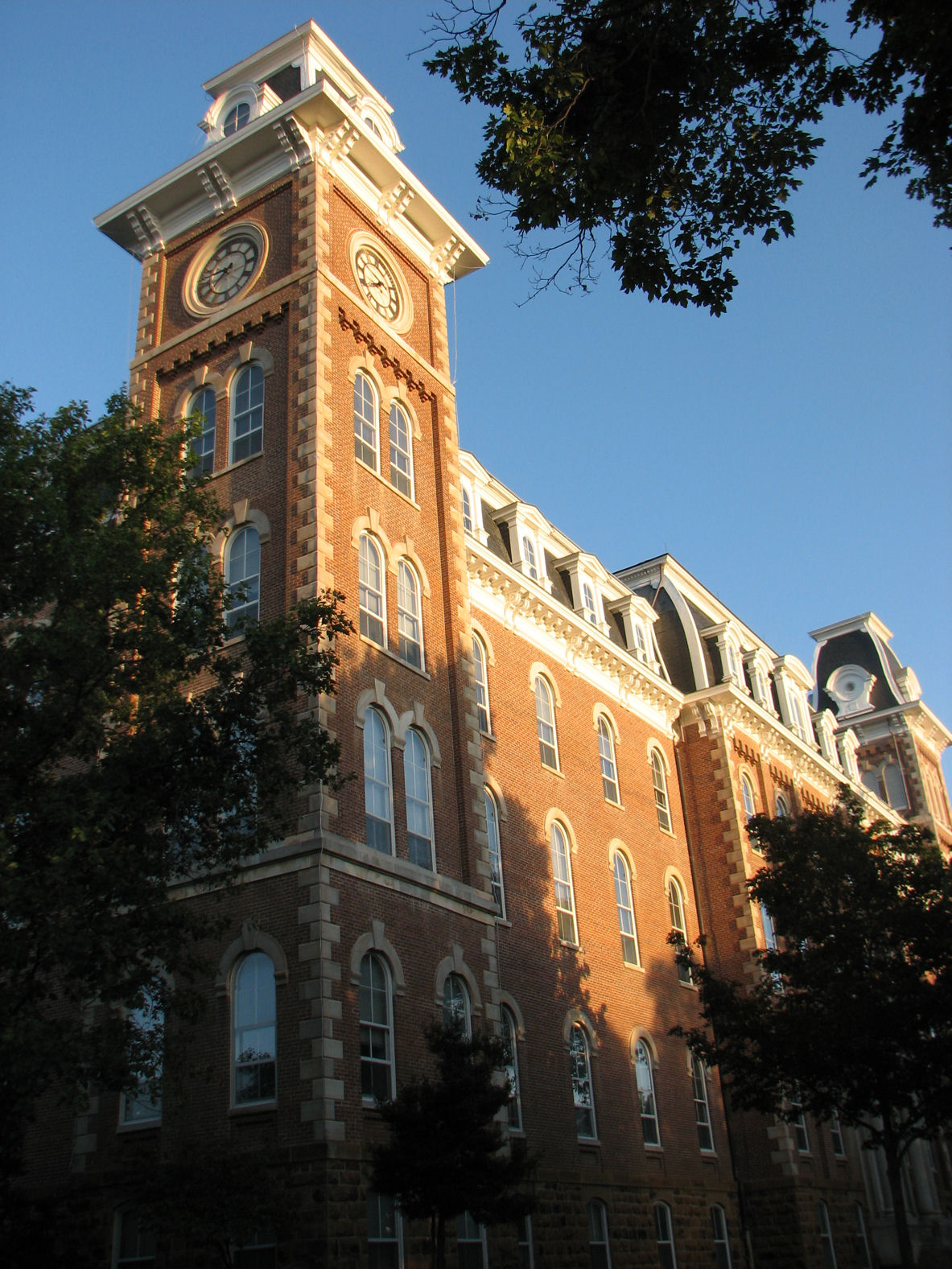
Old Main, the oldest and most recognizable building on campus

Old Main, originally University Hall, is the university's signature building and appears on its seal. The building was constructed between 1873 and 1875 as part of a land grant for the state of Arkansas. The building was designed in Second Empire architectural style. The exterior walls are made of local red brick, and the foundation uses local sandstone. John Mills Van Osdel's original plan called for a clock, but one was not installed until 2005. Old Main currently houses the offices of the J. William Fulbright College of Arts and Sciences, its honors program and five academic departments, as well as classrooms and meeting spaces.

Old Main was added to the National Register of Historic Places in 1970.

=== Old Main Lawn ===
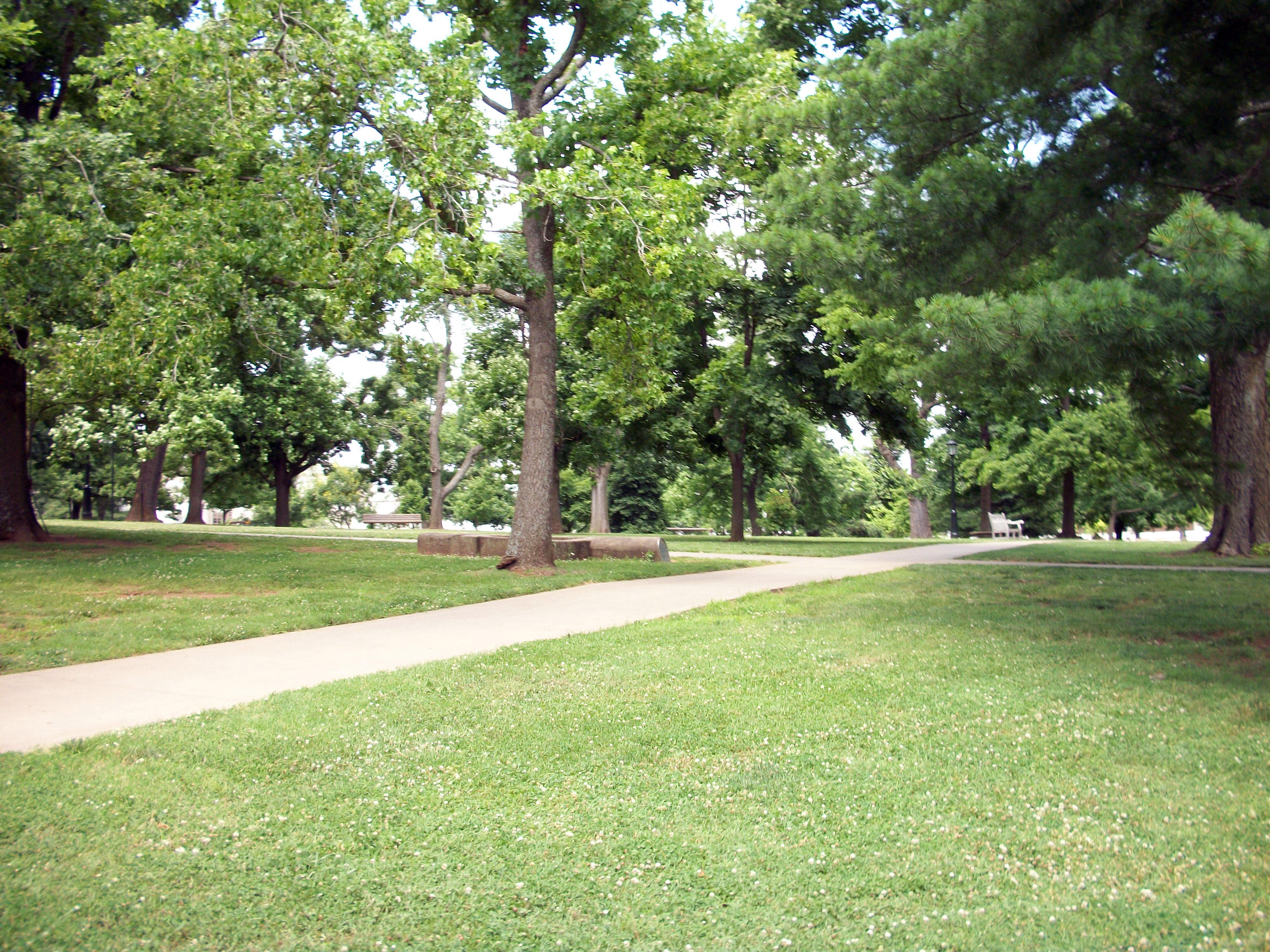
Old Main Lawn near Ozark Hall

Old Main Lawn is an area surrounding Old Main on the University of Arkansas campus. Prior to 1872, the land was known as the McIlroy Farm. It was purchased for use as a university campus because of its prominence (the campus is still referred to as "The Hill"). In the late 1890s, part of the lawn was used as the university's first football field. Sheep were grazed on part of it. Agricultural students planted an oatfield on part of it. The Lawn contains the earliest segments of Senior Walk, a concrete walking path that runs throughout the entire campus and contains the name of university graduates from every class since 1875. The lawn also contains the Spoofer's Stone, a piece of limestone that the builders of Old Main left in place after it fell out of an oxcart and broke. The stone was used as a meeting place for males and females during the 1880s when students of opposite sexes weren't allowed to mix. The campus arboretum contains every tree found in the state of Arkansas. The Old Main Lawn area was enclosed by sandstone blocks in early 1900.

=== Senior Walk ===
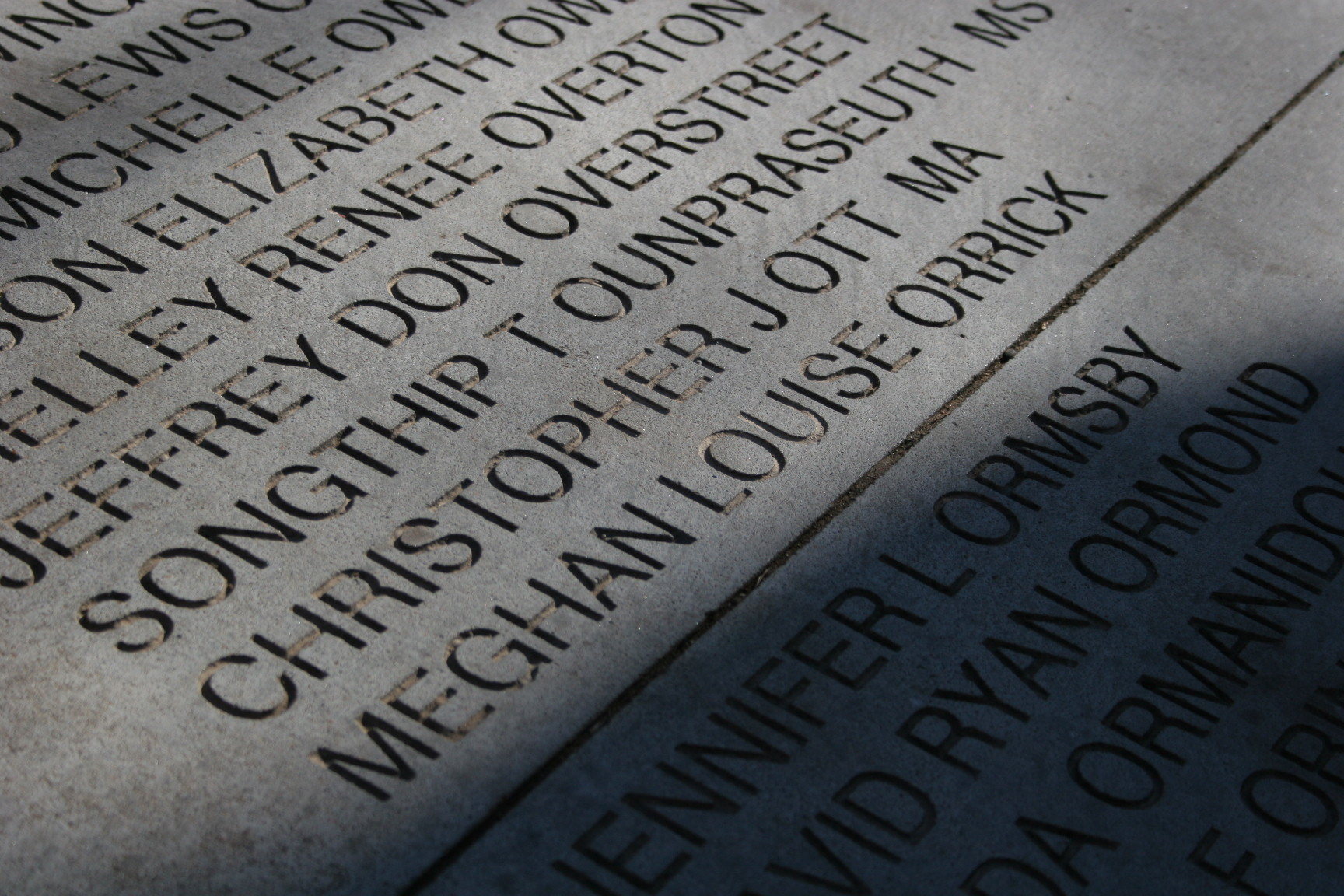
A sample of class of 2001 graduates

Senior Walk is a concrete footpath of over 3.5 miles (5.6 km) started in 1905 that contains the name of University of Arkansas graduates. The idea is unique to the University of Arkansas. Initially, sections of the walk were created by a representative of the graduating class who simply wrote the students' names in the wet concrete; the university began using brass letter stamps to imprint the names in wet concrete in the 1920s and continued that process until the late 1970s. The graduating classes prior to 1905 were added retroactively. Larger graduating classes led the university's staff to create the "Senior Sand Hog", which sandblasts the names into the concrete walks after the concrete has cured. For many years, according to university lore, freshmen at the university were counseled by upperclass students to not step on the sidewalk bearing the class of 1900, because the members of the 1900 class had all met untimely and tragic deaths. In truth, the members of the class of 1900 lived long, productive lives.

The university has designated future sidewalks to continue Senior Walk through at least 2030.

=== Agriculture Annex ===
Agriculture Hall was built in 1906 using funding from the Arkansas Legislature. It was one of six other buildings built at the same time. The new Agriculture Building was built in 1927, and the old Agriculture Annex became the university infirmary in 1940. The infirmary moved upon construction of the Pat Walker Health Center. Today, the Agriculture Annex building contains a computer lab for agriculture students in addition to an agriculture statistics lab and offices for graduate students.

=== Ella Carnall Hall ===
- Ella Carnall Hall
- U.S. National Register of Historic Places
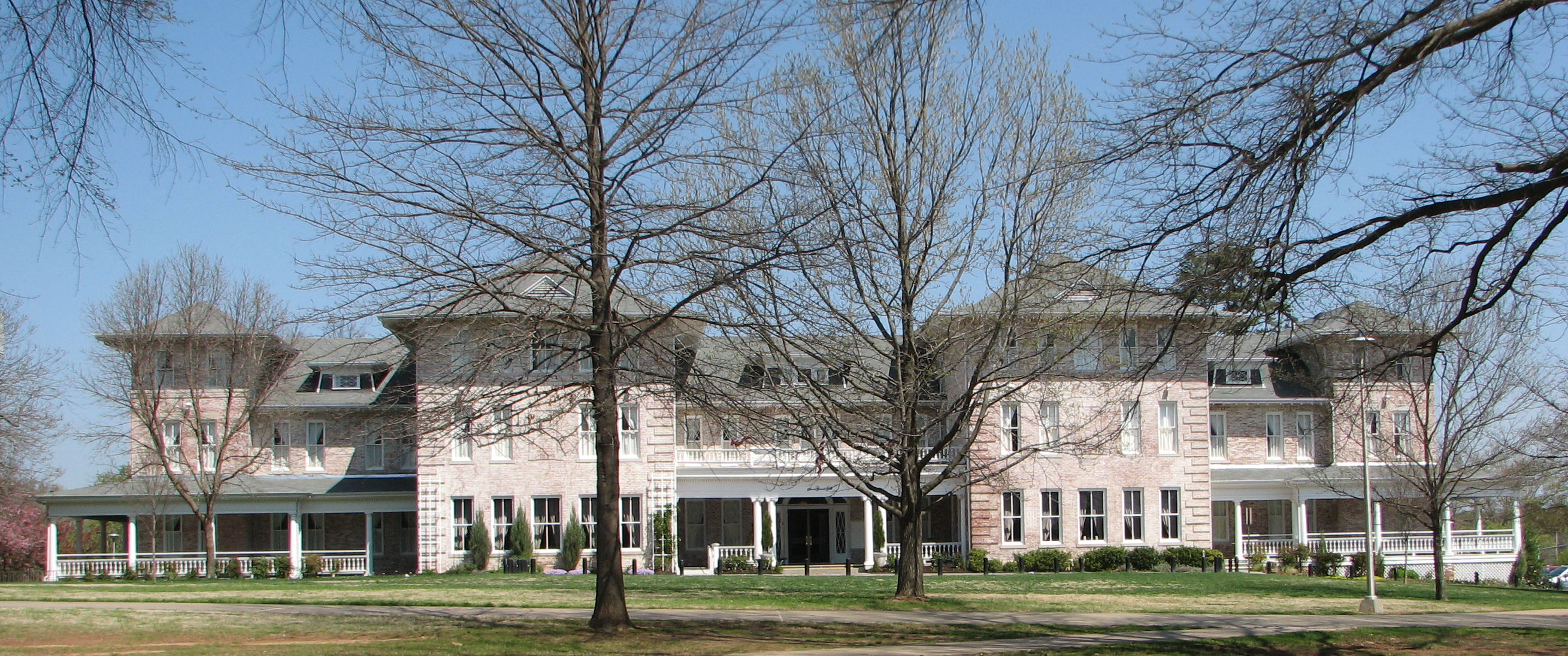
- Location: Arkansas Ave. and Maple St., Fayetteville, Arkansas
- Coordinates: 36°4′10″N 94°10′8″W
- Area: Less than one acre
- Built: 1900 or 1905
- Architect: Thompson, Charles L. (original); James Lambeth (1990s renovation)
- Architectural style: Colonial Revival
- MPS: Thompson, Charles L., Design Collection TR
- NRHP reference No.: 82000943
- Added to NRHP: December 22, 1982

The Inn at Carnall Hall and Ella's Restaurant are the university's own on-campus 50-room historic inn and five-star restaurant. This facility also serves the Hospitality and Restaurant Management academic program. Carnall Hall was built in 1905 as the university's first women's residence hall. The building was named after Ella Carnall, a noted teacher and role model for young women, and one of the campus’ first female faculty members. It was designed by Charles L. Thompson. The structure was added to the National Register of Historic Places in 1982. In the 1990s it was renovated into an inn and restaurant, with lead architect James Lambeth.

==== Construction ====
The Arkansas Legislature funded six buildings for the university in 1905, one of which was designated to be the first women's dormitory in the state. It was completed by 1906 and named for Miss Ella Howison Carnall, who was a prominent professor of English and modern languages from 1881 to 1894 at the university. The Hall was built on the far northeast corner of campus in keeping with the university's strict rules against fraternization between the sexes.

==== Uses ====
The building was used as a women's dormitory until 1967, and then housed the Phi Gamma Delta fraternity until 1977. Subsequently, the Hall was used for academics until the renovation of Old Main. Despite being listed on the National Register of Historic Places in 1982, the building fell into disrepair, and closed in 1991. However, due to the hard work of preservationists, the building has been refurbished and today operates as a hotel. It contains 49 rooms and is very popular during Arkansas Razorbacks sporting events.

=== Original Chemistry Building ===
Chemistry Building
- Interactive map of the Chemistry Building area

General information
- Architectural style: Mission/Spanish
- Location: Campus of the University of Arkansas, Fayetteville, Arkansas, US
- Completed: 1906
- Owner: University of Arkansas

Design and construction
- Architecture firm: C. L. Thompson & O. L. Gates
- Main contractor: Donaghey & McIlRoy

The Chemistry Building was built in 1906 as the original chemistry building on campus. A small, three-story brick building in the Spanish architecture style, it was outgrown and replaced by the new Chemistry Building in 1935. Today this building serves as the School of Social Work.

==== Construction ====
The Arkansas Legislature funded six buildings for the university in 1905, one of which was designated to be the university's first chemistry building. It was completed by 1906. Like many of the brick buildings, it was painted white in the 1930s to blend with the newer limestone-clad collegiate gothic-style buildings.

==== Uses ====
The building served as a chemistry building until 1935, when the new Chemistry Building was erected. The building then became home to the School of Law and was the site at which Silas Herbert Hunt enrolled at the university in 1948, becoming the first African American to integrate a southern university without threat of litigation. It later was home to the departments of Psychology and Geography, and is now used by the School of Social Work.

=== Peabody Hall ===
Peabody Hall was built in 1913 using a $40,000 donation from the George Peabody Fund. It was the first on-campus building built using private funds. It was built for use by the teacher education department and has been used by that department continuously since completion. Peabody Hall was completely renovated, inside and out, in 2011, garnering an award from the Historic Preservation Alliance of Arkansas.

=== Army ROTC Building ===
Originally a Women's Gymnasium, it was completed in 1925 by the campus Department of Buildings and Grounds with help from the engineering students. The floor was 60 feet (18 m) by 90 feet (27 m), and could hold two basketball courts or four volleyball courts. It also has a full basement. Today, the building is used by the Army ROTC with the Gym converted into a Drill hall with classrooms and the basement into offices and a lounge for cadets.

=== Engineering Hall ===
John A. White, Jr. Engineering Hall
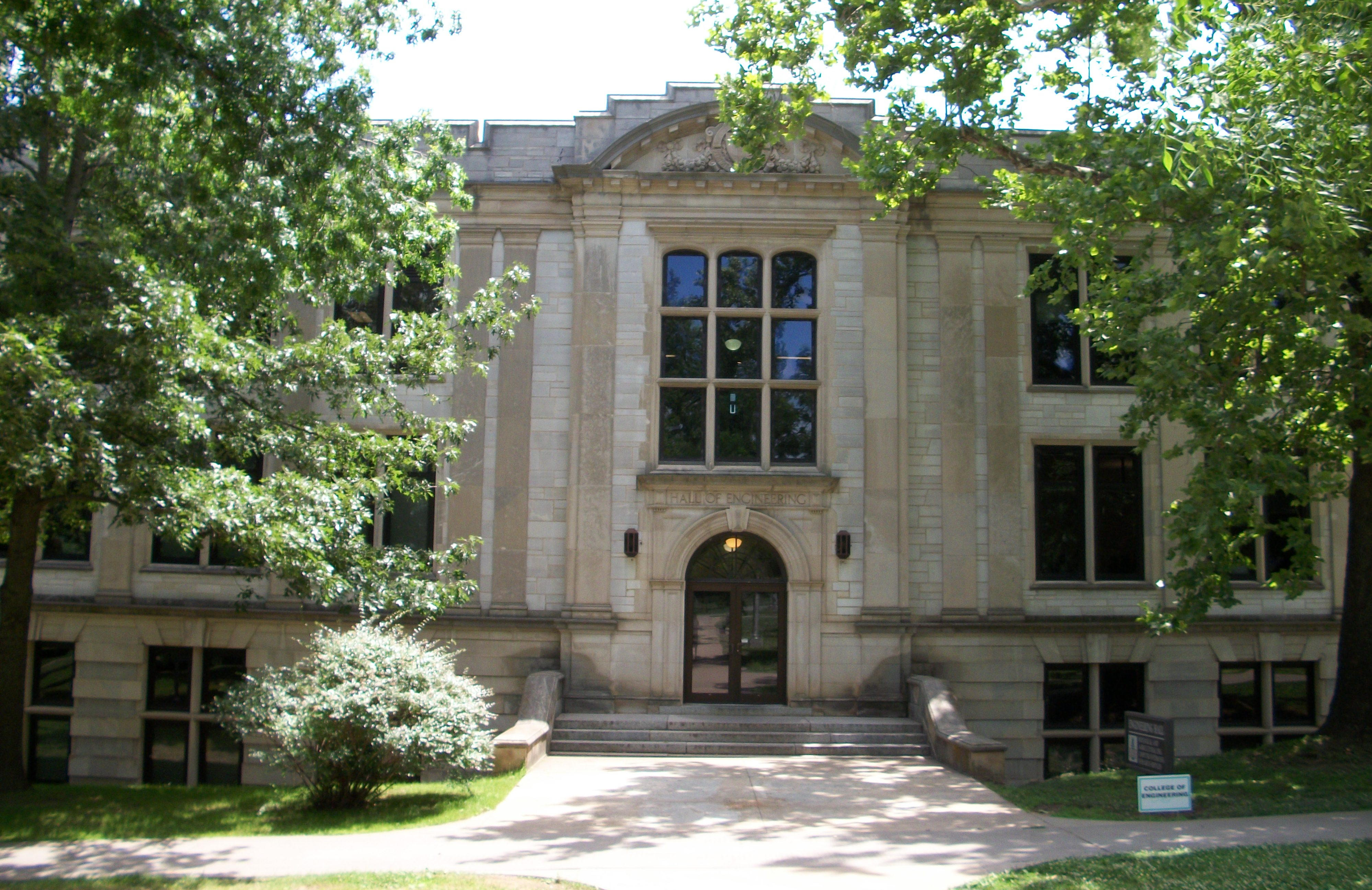
- North entrance
- Interactive map of the John A. White, Jr. Engineering Hall area

General information
- Type: Engineering education
- Architectural style: Collegiate Gothic
- Location: Campus of the University of Arkansas, Dickson Street; Fayetteville, Arkansas 72701
- Completed: 1927
- Renovated: 2013
- Owner: University of Arkansas

Design and construction
- Architect: H. Ray Burkes
- Architecture firm: Jamieson and Spearl

John A. White, Jr. Engineering Hall was completed in the collegiate gothic style in 1927. The building was built similar to the Agriculture Building, and was completed at around the same time. Using limestone from Batesville, Arkansas, the building holds an auditorium, library, classrooms, labs, studios, a blueprint room, and a tool room. Following the construction of Bell Engineering Center in 1987, the original Engineering Hall is now used primarily for small classes. The building was renamed "John A. White Jr. Engineering Hall" in 2012 in honor of former chancellor John A. White.

=== Agriculture Building ===
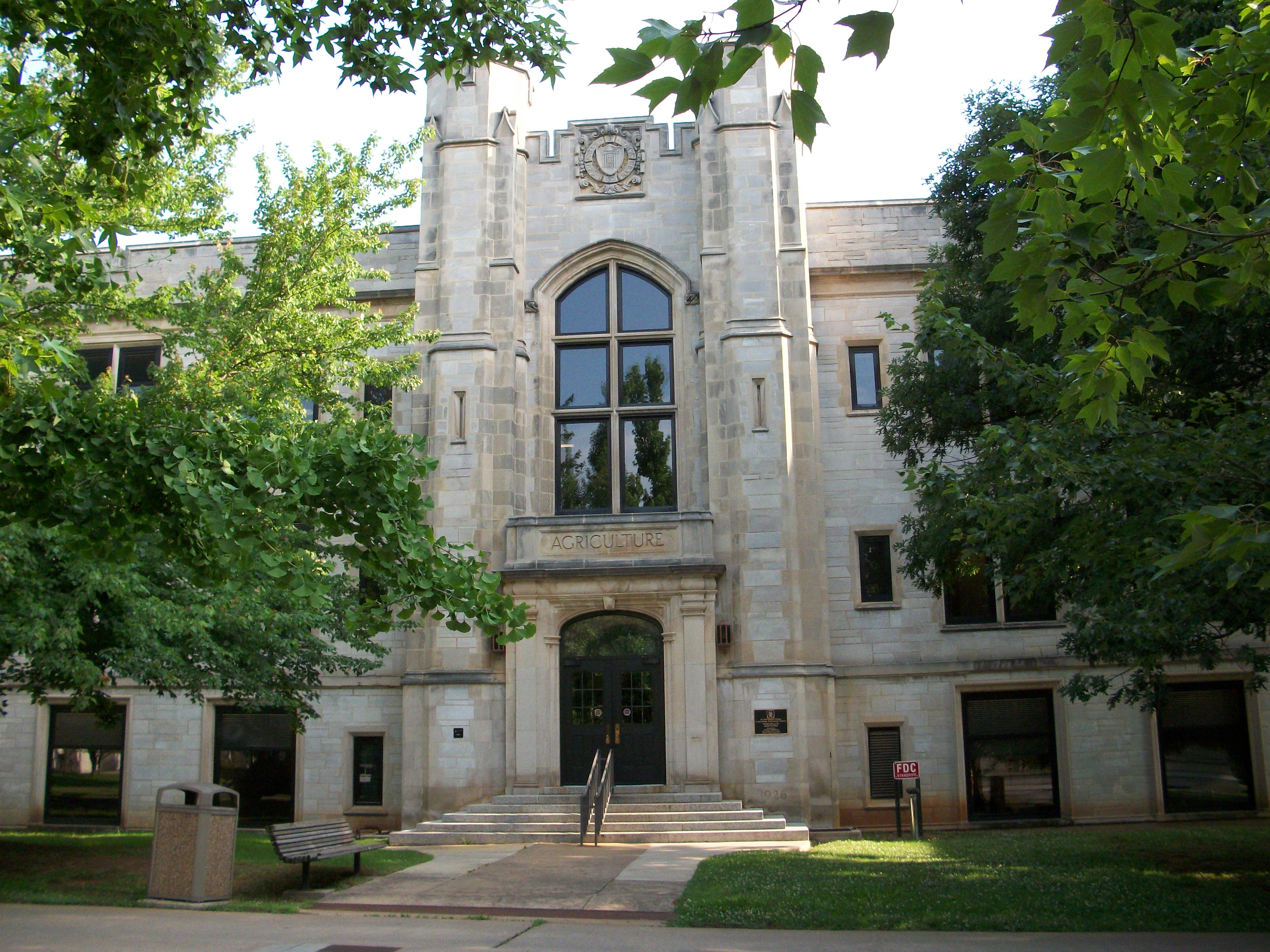
The Agriculture Building was completed in 1927 as part of the 1925 master plan.

The Agriculture Building at the University of Arkansas was completed in 1927 in the collegiate gothic style. The building at first hosted six departments, a library, and offices. The Agriculture Building and Engineering Hall were built at the same time in the same style, as part of the 1925 master plan. Upon completion of the new Plant Sciences building, the original Agriculture Building currently houses the agribusiness and economics, agricultural and extension education, agricultural communications, and entomology departments.

=== Chi Omega Greek Theatre ===
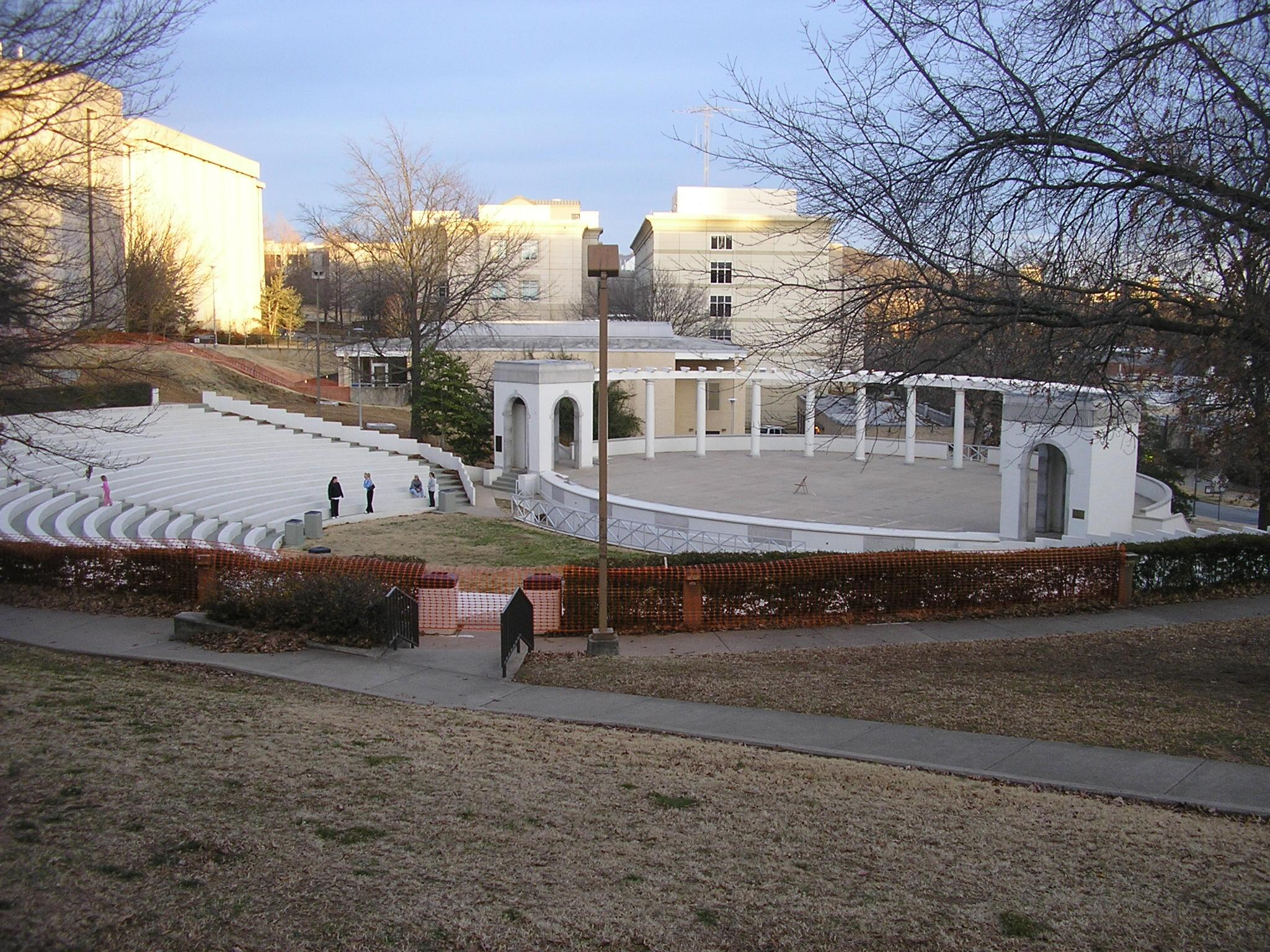
The Chi Omega Greek Theatre was completed in 1930.

The Chi Omega Greek Theatre is a multipurpose semi-circular amphitheatre, designed with the Theatre of Dionysus as an inspiration. Chi Omega donated the theatre to the university, and president John C. Futrall accepted the gift on June 28, 1930, in accordance with the 1925 Jamieson and Spearl master plan. Chi Omega was founded at Arkansas in 1895. It has served host for concerts, pep rallies, commencements, and classes.

==== Chi Omega Greek Theatre Landscape ====
The landscape around the Chi Omega Greek Theatre includes shade trees, hedges, and scenic lawns. From the lawn, downtown Fayetteville is visible. The Theatre and Landscape augment each other, together making a historic landscape.

=== Vol Walker Hall ===
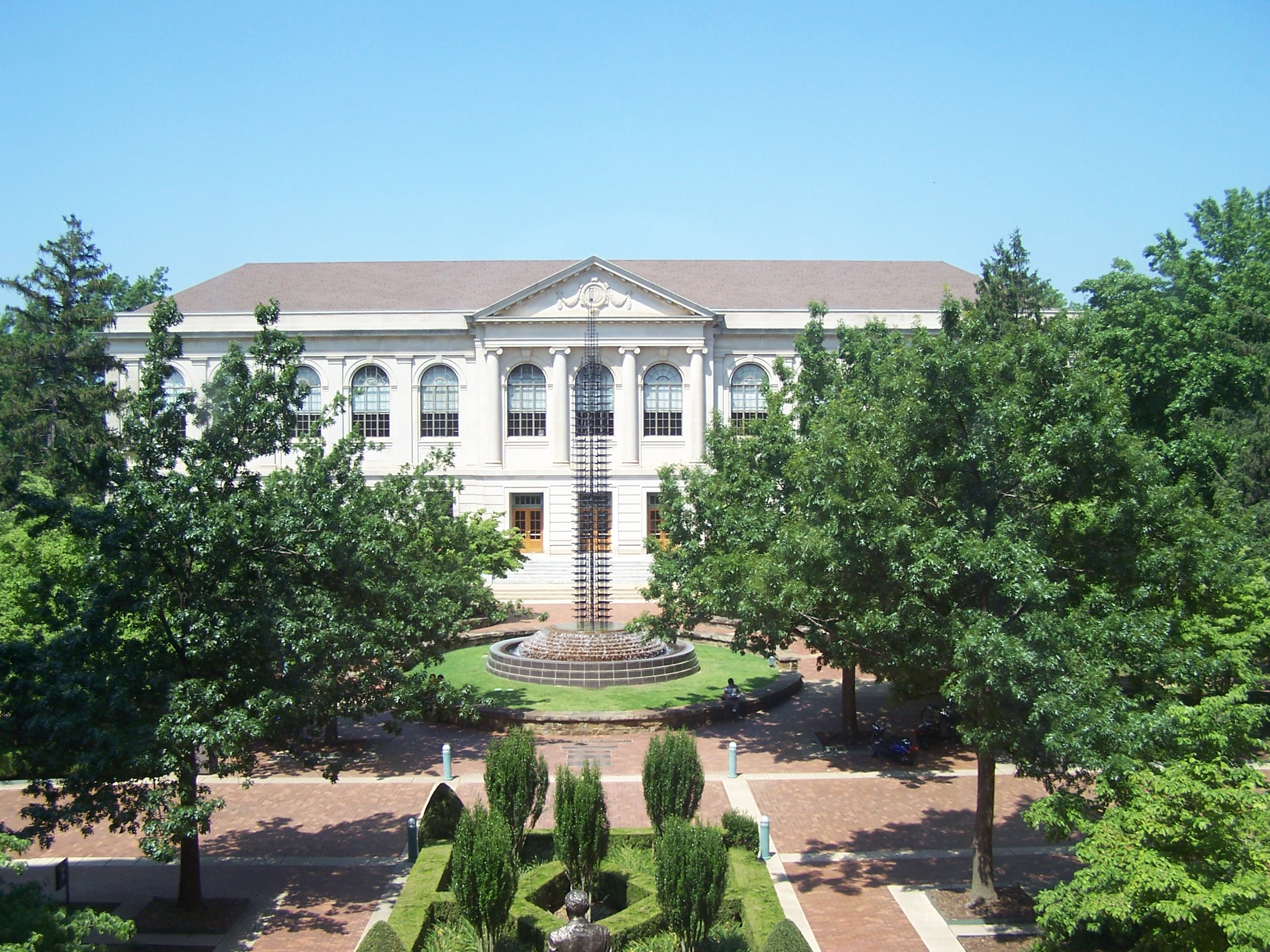
Vol Walker Hall as viewed from Old Main

Vol Walker Hall, originally Vol Walker Library, was the library on the University of Arkansas campus. Modeled after Rush Rhees Library at the University of Rochester, the University of Arkansas obtained Public Works Administration funding to build the building in the Classic Revival form. The building has also housed the School of Architecture since the construction of Mullins Library in 1968. The building was renovated from 2011 to 2013, and a 30,000-square-foot addition, the Steven L. Anderson Design Center, allowed all three of the school's departments—architecture, landscape architecture and interior design—to share a single building.

=== Chemistry Building ===
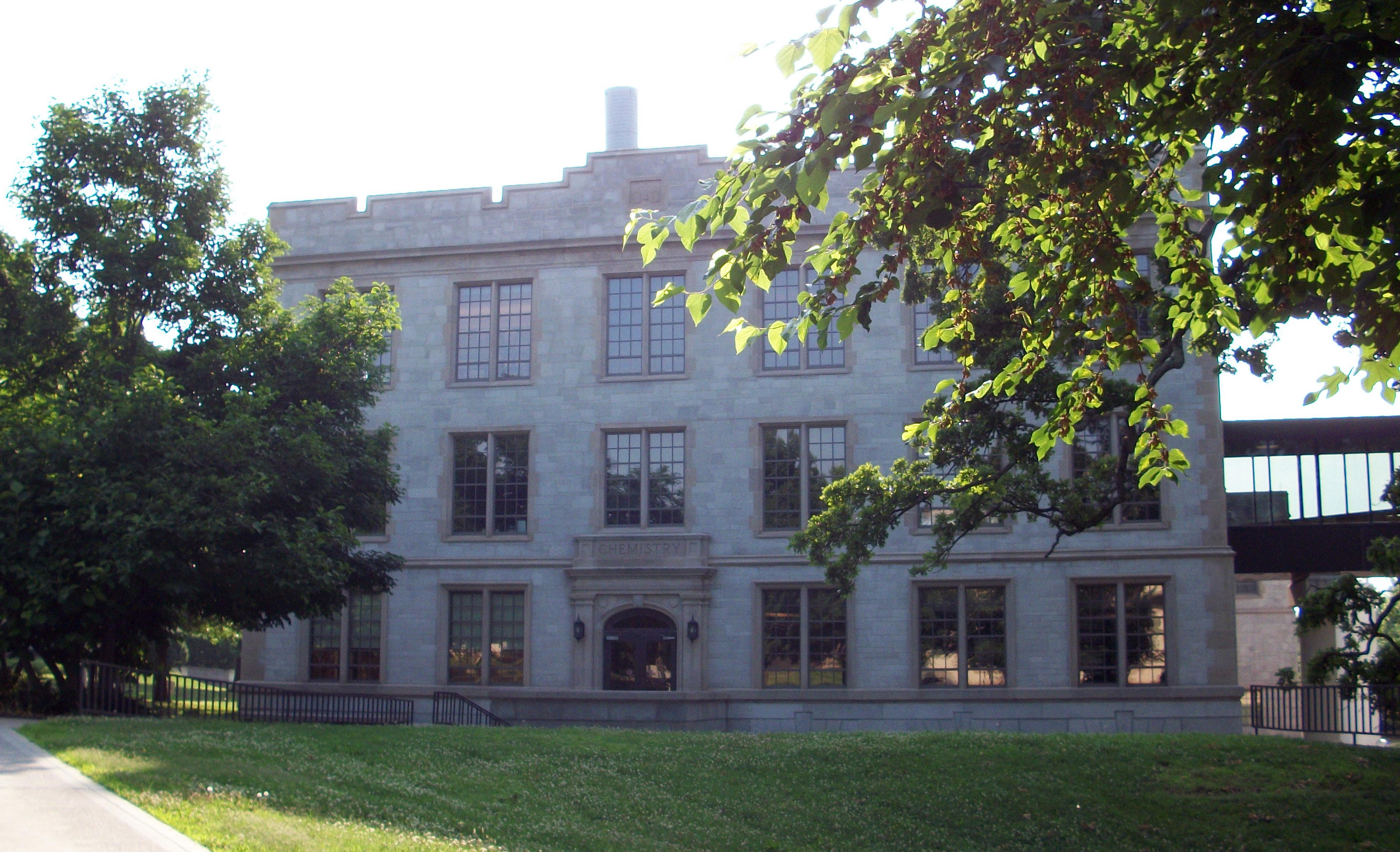
The Chemistry Building's west entrance

The Chemistry Building was built in 1935 to replace a smaller chemistry building. It was constructed using Public Works Administration funding in conjunction with Vol Walker Library as part of the 1925 master plan. The university also outgrew this Chemistry Building, and a new building was added by skywalk in 1992.

=== Gibson Hall ===
Gibson Hall
- Interactive map of the Gibson Hall area

General information
- Type: men's dormitory
- Architectural style: Collegiate Gothic
- Location: Dickson St., and Garland Ave., Fayetteville, Arkansas, US
- Completed: 1937
- Renovated: 1963, 2007
- Cost: $165,000

Design and construction
- Architect: Wittenberg & Delony
- Architecture firm: Jamieson & Spearl

Gibson Hall, originally Razorback Hall, is a women's residence hall on the University of Arkansas campus. Gibson Hall was originally a men's residence hall, and the three-story brick building was named Razorback Hall. Following a 1963 remodeling, the building became an upper-tier women's dormitory. In 1981, it was renamed posthumously for James L. Gibson, the late University housing director.

=== Gibson Annex ===
The Gibson Annex is the accompanying dining hall for Gibson Hall. Originally named Razorback Dining Hall, it was renamed Gibson Annex when the hall was renamed. The dining hall was constructed in the Collegiate Gothic style by Wittenberg & Delony of Little Rock, completed in 1937.

=== Former Men's Gymnasium ===
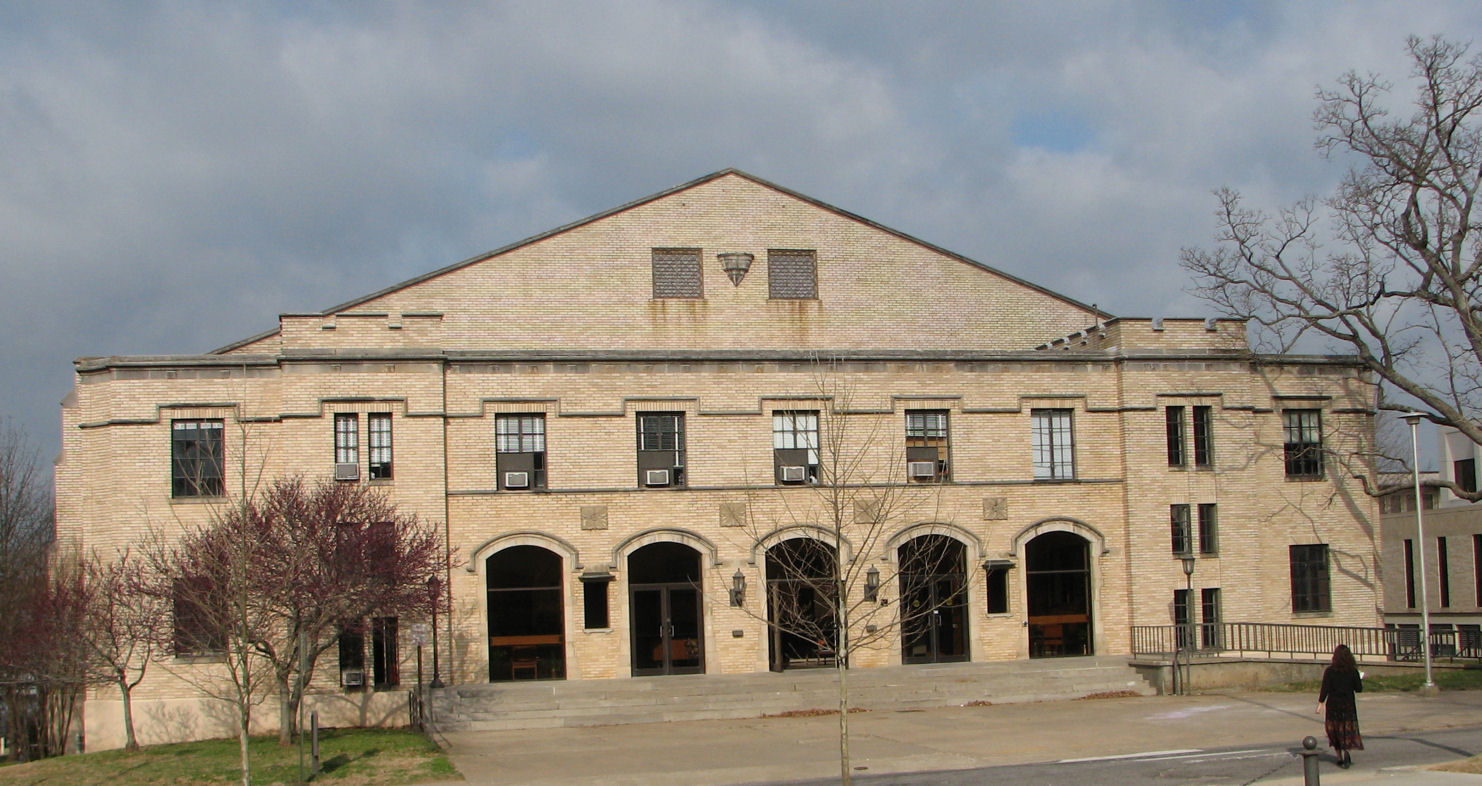
Old fieldhouse at the university

The Men's Gymnasium was built in 1937 using PWA funds by Haralson & Nelson. Using light brick and limestone, the building was built in the Collegiate Gothic style. It could hold 3,500 patrons as a stadium and 7,500 as an auditorium. It housed Arkansas Razorbacks basketball until the construction of Barnhill Arena in 1954, the physical education department until 1982, and the university museum until 2003. It now contains the Arkansas Center for Space and Planetary Sciences.

=== Memorial Hall ===
- Memorial Hall
- U.S. National Register of Historic Places
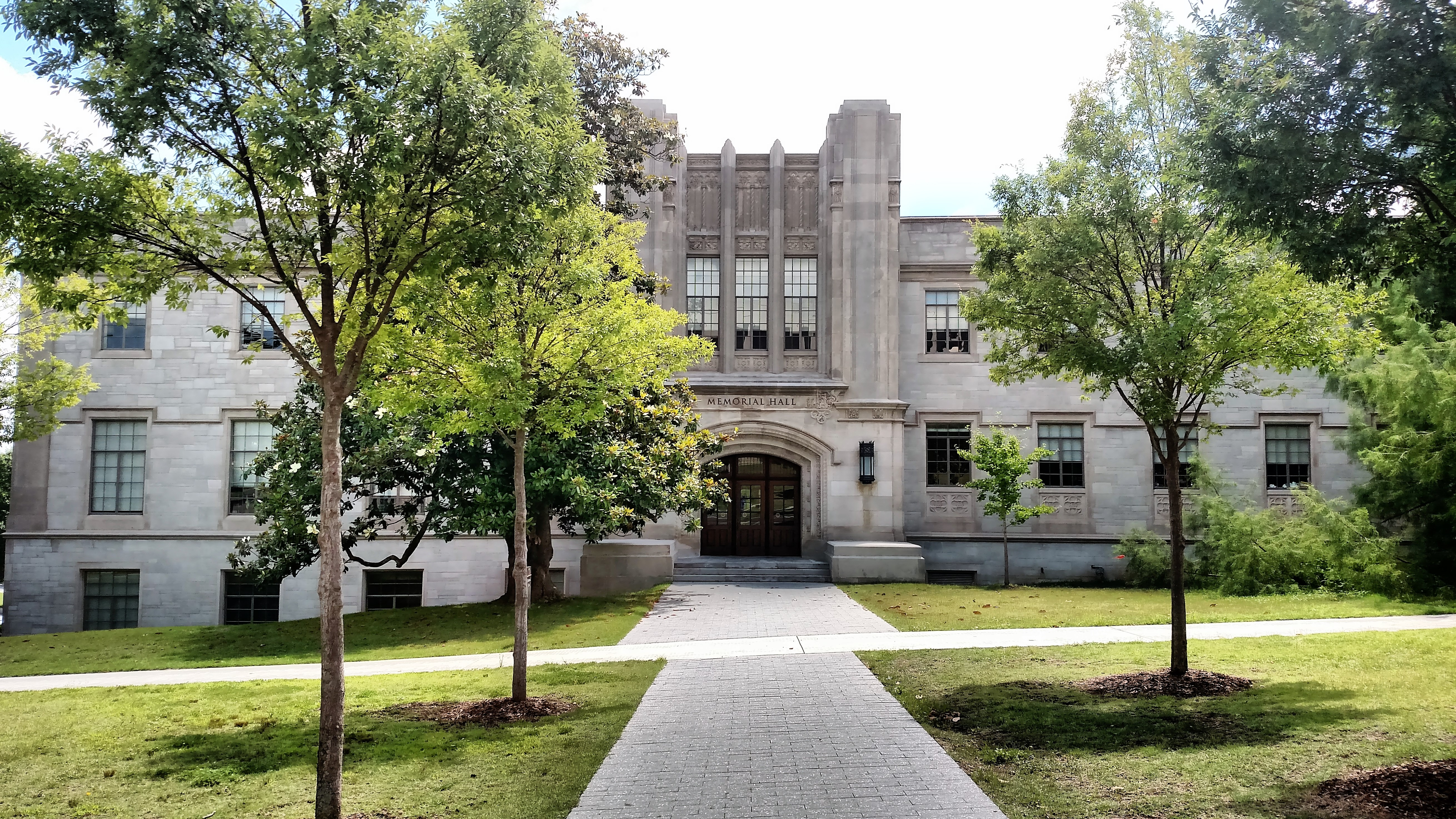
- Location: 480 Campus Drive; Fayetteville, Arkansas
- Coordinates: 36°4′11″N 94°10′15″W
- Area: 58,000 square feet (5,400 m^{2})
- Built: 1940
- Architectural style: Collegiate Gothic (front), Gothic and Classical Revival (remainder)
- MPS: Public Schools in the Ozarks
- NRHP reference No.: 92001104
- Added to NRHP: September 1992

Futrall Memorial Hall, usually just Memorial Hall, originally Student Union at the University of Arkansas is a building on the university's campus in Fayetteville, Arkansas. The building was added to the National Register of Historic Places in September 1992 as Student Union Building-University of Arkansas, Fayetteville.

==== History ====
President John C. Futrall identified a need for a student union on campus and began charging students a $2 "student union fee" on their bill. That fee, coupled with Public Works Administration funding, resulted in the construction of Memorial Hall, which at the time was named Student Union. On September 12, 1939, Futrall was killed in an automobile accident, and the Board of Trustees passed a resolution to change the name to Futrall Memorial Hall. The building was still referred to as the Student Union, despite the motion.

The grand building was opened in March 1940, and featured a bookstore, restaurant, post office, confectionery, and a large ballroom with bandshell. The second floor had offices for The Arkansas Traveler (the student publication). The building remained as it was for ten years, until a large three-story addition was finished to provide better food services. Upon completion of the Arkansas Union in 1973, Memorial Hall became home to the psychology department, and many of the rooms were converted to classrooms. It also gained the Landscape Architecture and Air Force ROTC departments.

The Board of Trustees again changed the name to Memorial Hall in 1973, which is how it is known today. The building still houses the three listed departments to this day.

==== Features ====
Memorial Hall's interior contains many art deco features from the period of construction, including large lights near the steps of the north entrance and many sleek lines. The floors feature repeating patterns typical of art deco construction and the staircases appear streamlined and modern. At the west entrance to the building stand two large, mature trees. One is a Bald Cypress and the other a southern magnolia. Both trees date to the time of Memorial Hall's construction.

=== Gearhart Hall ===
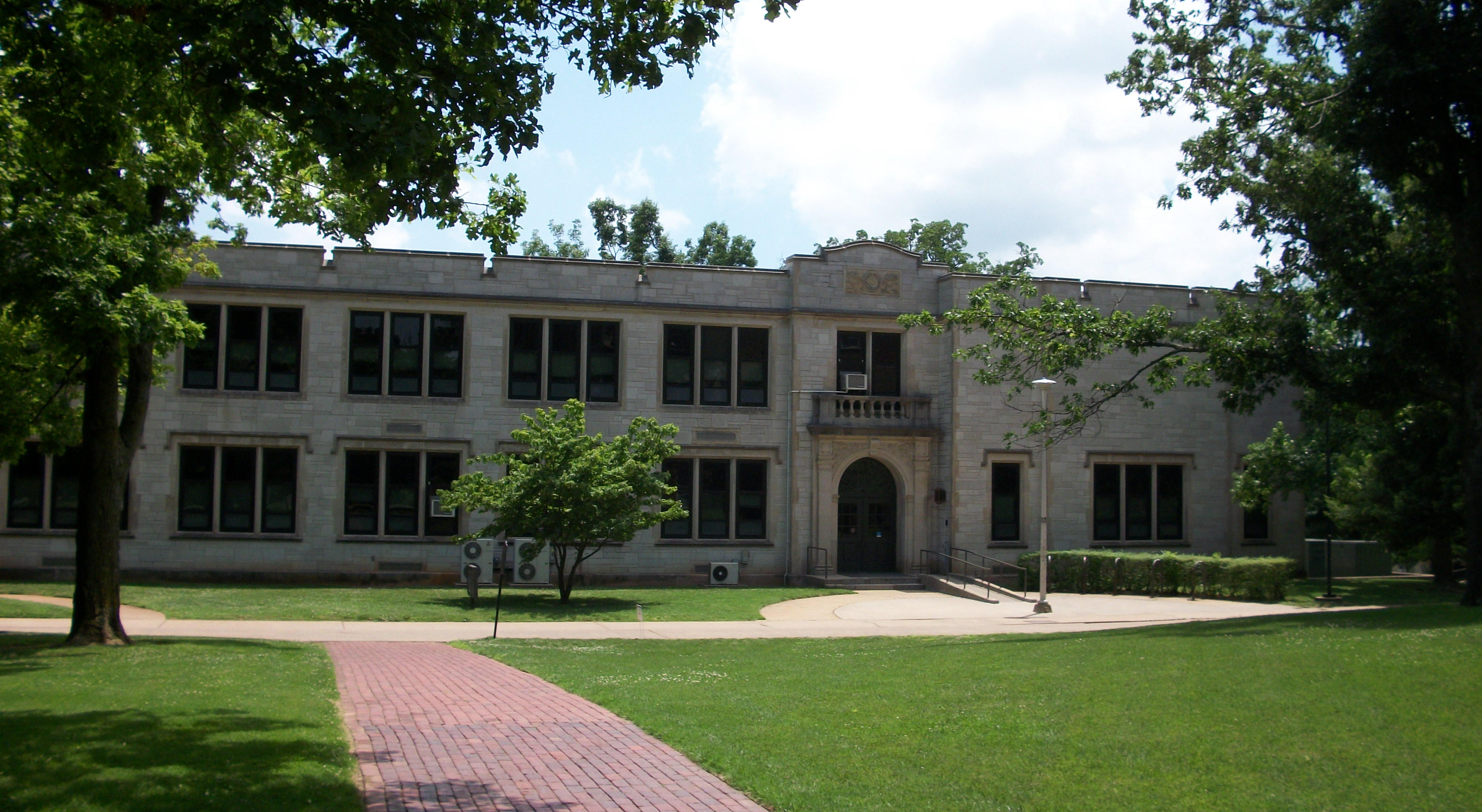
Gearhart Hall now houses offices for the Graduate School.

Gearhart Hall (formerly known as Ozark Hall) is one of the older buildings on campus. It is home to several of the physical science departments. The building was formerly attached to the Commerce Building, and together the structure was known as the Business Administration Building. The Business Administration department moved out in 1978, and the Commerce Building was razed in 1987. The building is located directly to the south of Old Main.

=== Home Economics Building ===
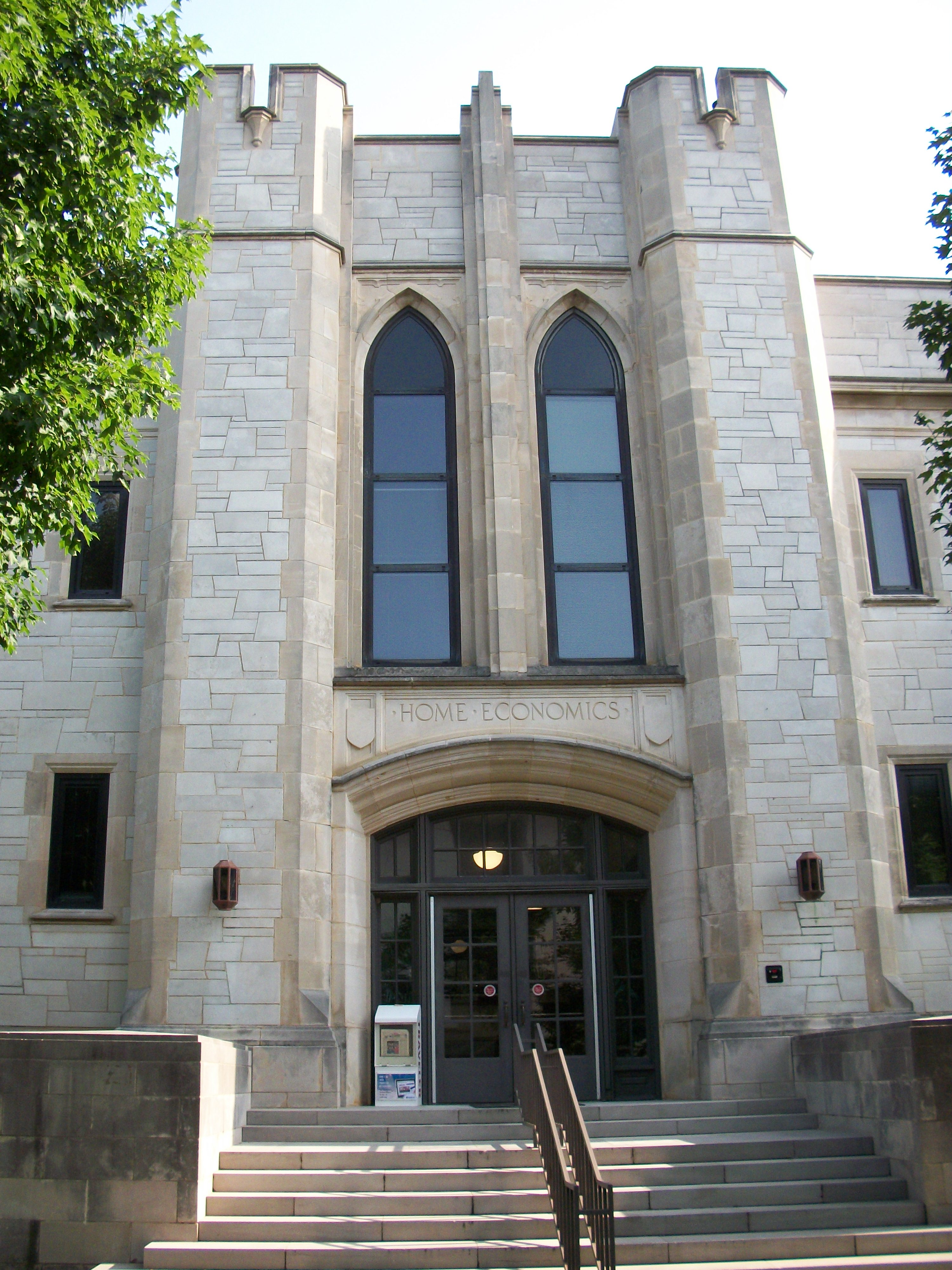

The Home Economics Building is a two-story Collegiate Gothic classroom building, built in 1939. Its walls are cut stone, and are topped by a crenellated parapet, which obscures the tar roof. A tall entrance tower rises at the center, with a multipane lancet window at the second level and a recessed entrance at the first.

== See also ==
- Campus of the University of Arkansas - lists the thirteen non-contributing buildings on campus and some on-campus monuments.
- History of the University of Arkansas - a complete history of the U of A
- University of Arkansas
- John C. Futrall - University president responsible for the construction of many of the early buildings
- David Mullins - University president responsible for many of the newer buildings listed above
- National Register of Historic Places listings in Washington County, Arkansas - the list this district is listed on
