= John C. Futrall =

American football coach and college administrator

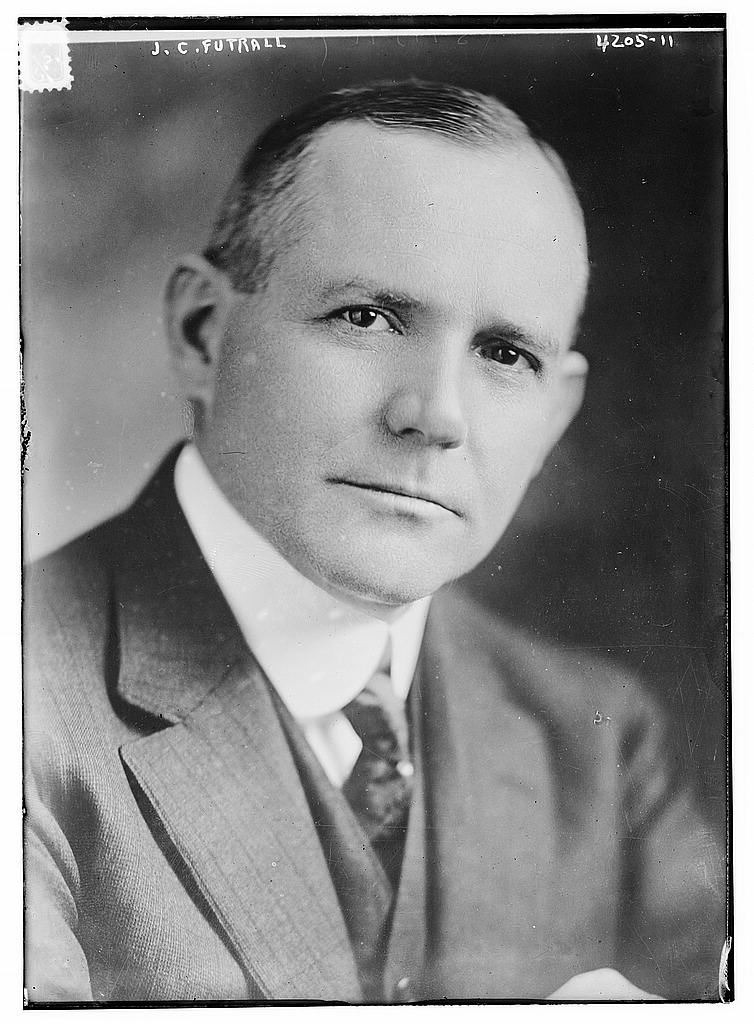
- Futrall in 1917

Biographical details
- Born: March 9, 1873 near Jackson, Tennessee, U.S.
- Died: September 12, 1939 (aged 66) near West Fork, Arkansas, U.S.

Coaching career (HC unless noted)
- 1894–1896: Arkansas Industrial

Head coaching record
- Overall: 5–2

John Clinton Futrall (March 9, 1873 – September 12, 1939) was an American football coach and college administrator. An alumnus of the Arkansas Industrial University, later renamed the University of Arkansas, he was the first head coach of the Arkansas Razorbacks football program, serving from 1894 to 1896, while the school's mascot was still the Cardinal. Futrall later served as president of the University of Arkansas from 1913 to 1939. He was killed in an auto accident in 1939. The first student union on the University of Arkansas campus was named Futrall Memorial Hall in his honor when it opened later that year.

== Presidency at the University of Arkansas ==
After two tenuous years of temporary presidents and a nationwide search, the board of directors of the university selected John Clinton Futrall as the university president in 1914. Futrall was not a candidate from afar, but had been a professor of Latin and Greek since 1895. Inherited from his predecessor's administration was a dire financial crisis, severe enough that the school had to borrow money to pay for student labor. Futrall quickly sought to correct the situation by lowering salaries, decreasing services, and firings. His goal of fiscal solidity for the university was joined by Governor Charles H. Brough, who pushed through legislation guaranteeing the school a percentage of the state property tax.

Futrall's administration remains to the present the longest of any University of Arkansas president, spanning twenty-five years and ending only with his death in 1939. In this time period, Futrall successfully defended against the relocation of the university to Little Rock, the official accreditation of the college in the North Central Association of Colleges and Schools, survived two revolts, one by students and another by bankers, and oversaw the construction of most of the collegiate Gothic buildings on campus. The funding for the new buildings was made possible by a bonds from the state and resulted in the construction of the engineering and agricultural buildings in 1926 and 1927, respectively. The issue of money also lead Futrall to actively deciding to limit the post-graduate studies at the school. While the Graduate School was established in 1927, Futrall's decision to limit its cost, lead to no doctoral programs until after his death.

The Bankers Agricultural revolt had its origin in 1919 when the Profitable Farming Bureau (PFB), an agency established by bankers in Little Rock, to promote further investment in agriculture, began to pressure Futrall and the Board of Directors on the issue of the university's College of Agriculture and extension services. In effect, the PFB sought to place an individual educated in modern agricultural practices of the day, as well loyal to its purposes and aims, in charge of the department and its extension services; something that Futrall absolutely refused to consider. Under the growing stress placed on the university by the PFB, the financially tight Futrall and board, undertook the purchase of 423 acres (1.71 km^{2}) of farm land at $123 an acre. Futrall ultimately fended off the attempt by PFB to gain de facto control of the university's agricultural program by choosing a new dean who meet all the requirements that the PFB wanted, but one who was loyal to Futrall and not the agency.

Not long after the conclusion of this battle, a new one ensued, this time concerning the removal of the university from Northwest Arkansas. It began with the introduction of a bill in the Arkansas House of Representatives, by a representative from Pope County, to break away the Colleges of Agriculture and Engineering and place them in Russellville. As part of the attempt, the proponents from Pope County had gained the support of individuals from Pulaski County, in exchange for assisting later with any attempts to move the school or parts of it to Little Rock. Both the university and Fayetteville fought the move, and the bill was successfully beaten back in a vote of 52 to 37. Despite the setback, new bills were submitted to time a statewide referendum on the matter with the holding of the 1924 Democrat primary. Proponents of the move went so far as to establish the Arkansas University Removal Association to lobby for a more successful result. Among the chief defenders of the university was Vol Walker and former governor Brough, and after hours and days of speeches for and against the move, the issue was silenced when the Arkansas Senate voted to indefinitely postpone any vote upon the bill urging the school's removal.

By 1938, the growing university needed a student union building, and Futrall began charging a $2 per year "student union" fee. The result was Memorial Hall, one of three buildings funded by the Public Works Administration. The Home Economics Building and Classroom Building (part of what is now Ozark Hall) were also added. The Jackson, Tennessee native would never see the final fruits of his labor, however, as Futrall died on September 12, 1939, in an automobile accident on his way back from Little Rock. In addition to the aforementioned events of his time as president, he oversaw the creation of a student government, the expansion of student extracurricular activities, and the founding of the School of Law, amid other significant moments in the history of the school. The Board of Trustees passed a resolution to posthumously name the new student union building "Futrall Memorial Hall" in the president's honor.

== Head coaching record ==
Year	Team	Overall	Conference	Standing	Bowl/playoffs
Arkansas Industrial Cardinals (Independent) (1894–1896)
1894	Arkansas Industrial	2–1			
1895	Arkansas Industrial	1–0			
1896	Arkansas Industrial	2–1			
Arkansas Industrial:		5–2			
Total:		5–2			
