= Charles Minor (educator) =

American academic (1835–1903)

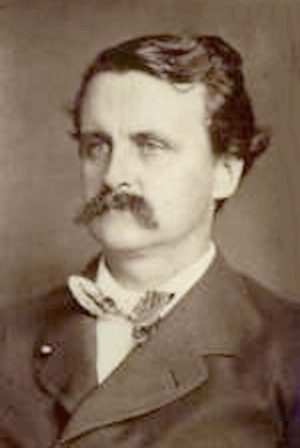

1st President of Virginia Agriculture and Mechanical College
- In office August 14, 1872 – December 10, 1879
- Preceded by: Position Created
- Succeeded by: John Lee Buchanan

Personal details
- Born: December 3, 1835 Hanover County, Virginia, U.S.
- Died: July 13, 1903 (aged 67) Albemarle County, Virginia, U.S.
- Education: University of Virginia

Military service
- Allegiance: Confederate States of America
- Branch/service: Confederate States Army

Charles Landon Carter Minor (December 3, 1835 – July 13, 1903) was an American educator. He served as the first president of the Virginia Agricultural and Mechanical College (now known as Virginia Tech), Virginia's new land-grant institution.

== Biography ==
Minor, a native of Hanover County, Virginia, held a master's degree from the University of Virginia and had served as combat and staff officer in the Confederate Army. During the Civil War, Minor served under General Stonewall Jackson and saw action at Manassas and in battles around Richmond.

Prior to his appointment as president of VAMC he taught at Sewanee Episcopal Seminary in Tennessee. Minor had previously spent a year as president of the Maryland Agricultural College (now the University of Maryland) from 1867 to 1868.

Minor opened the doors to the new college on October 1, 1872, with three faculty members, not one of them a professor of agriculture or mechanics. By the end of the first week 29 students were enrolled. By the end of the first year 132 students were enrolled, exceeding expectations. During his presidency, Minor petitioned for, and money was appropriated for the expansion of the campus beyond the one building it had at the time, the Preston and Olin building. Minor also established a library during his term.

During a faculty meeting, the generally easygoing Minor and hot-headed Gen. James H. Lane, the professor of mathematics and foreign languages with responsibility for military training, got into a fistfight. Both were convicted of disorderly conduct. Ultimately, Minor was removed from office due to the erosion of confidence in his administration.

After his dismissal from VAMC, Minor taught at St. Paul's in Baltimore, Maryland., and Episcopal High School in Alexandria, and bought Shenandoah Valley Academy, a military school in Winchester.

Charles Minor was a descendant of Colonial Governor of Virginia, Robert Carter I and a great-grandson of Virginia Governor John Page. He married Frances Ansley Cazenove, of Alexandria, Virginia, in 1860. Together they had two children. He died July 13, 1903, in Albemarle County, Virginia, at age 67.

Preceded by George Washington Custis Lee	President of the Maryland Agricultural College; 1867 – 1868	Succeeded by Franklin Buchanan
Preceded by No one	President of the Virginia Agricultural and Mechanical College; 1872 – 1879	Succeeded by John Lee Buchanan
