= John Lee Buchanan =

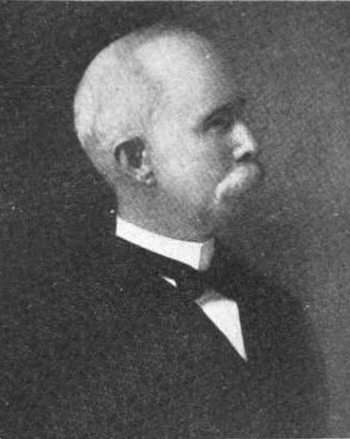

2nd President of Virginia Agricultural and Mechanical College
- In office March 1, 1880 – January 17, 1882
- Preceded by: Charles Minor
- Succeeded by: Thomas Nelson Conrad

6th President of University of Arkansas
- In office 1894–1902
- Preceded by: Edward H. Murfee
- Succeeded by: Henry S. Hartzog

Personal details
- Born: June 19, 1831 Rich Valley, Virginia, U.S.
- Died: January 19, 1922 (aged 90) Rich Valley, Virginia, U.S.
- Education: Emory and Henry College

John Lee Buchanan (June 19, 1831 – January 19, 1922) was the second president of Virginia Tech (then Virginia Agricultural and Mechanical College) and the sixth president of the University of Arkansas.

== Biography ==
Buchanan was born to Patrick C. and Margaret Graham Buchanan in Rich Valley, Smyth County, Virginia. He received an A.B. in 1856 and an M.A. in 1858 or 1860, both from Emory and Henry College, where he was a member of the faculty until 1878 with the exception of the Civil War years when he served the Confederate States in the mining department. In 1879 he became the Latin chair at Vanderbilt University and later served as president of Emory and Henry College before being appointed VAMC president in 1880. The state legislature replaced the Board of Visitors, who in turn removed all university officials and faculty in June 1880. Buchanan re-assumed the presidency of VAMC in August 1881, but was removed for the second and final time in January 1882.

At this time, Buchanan began teaching at Martha Washington College in Abingdon, Virginia, later becoming president there. In 1884 he served on a state committee that established the State Normal Female School in Farmville (now Longwood University). From 1885 to 1889 he served as state superintendent of public instruction (hence was ex officio member of the VAMC Board of Visitors). He began teaching at Randolph-Macon College in 1889, later becoming president. He resigned the presidency of Randolph-Macon in 1894 to assume presidency of what was then Arkansas Industrial University before he renamed it to University of Arkansas and where he remained until retiring in 1902.

Buchanan died January 19, 1922, in Rich Valley, Virginia, at age 90.

== Honors ==
Two residence halls at the University of Arkansas were named after Buchanan, including the Buchanan-Droke residence hall.

== Personal life ==
Buchanan married Frances Elizabeth Wiley, with whom he had nine children.
