= Old Main (University of Arkansas) =

- Old Main, University of Arkansas
- U.S. National Register of Historic Places
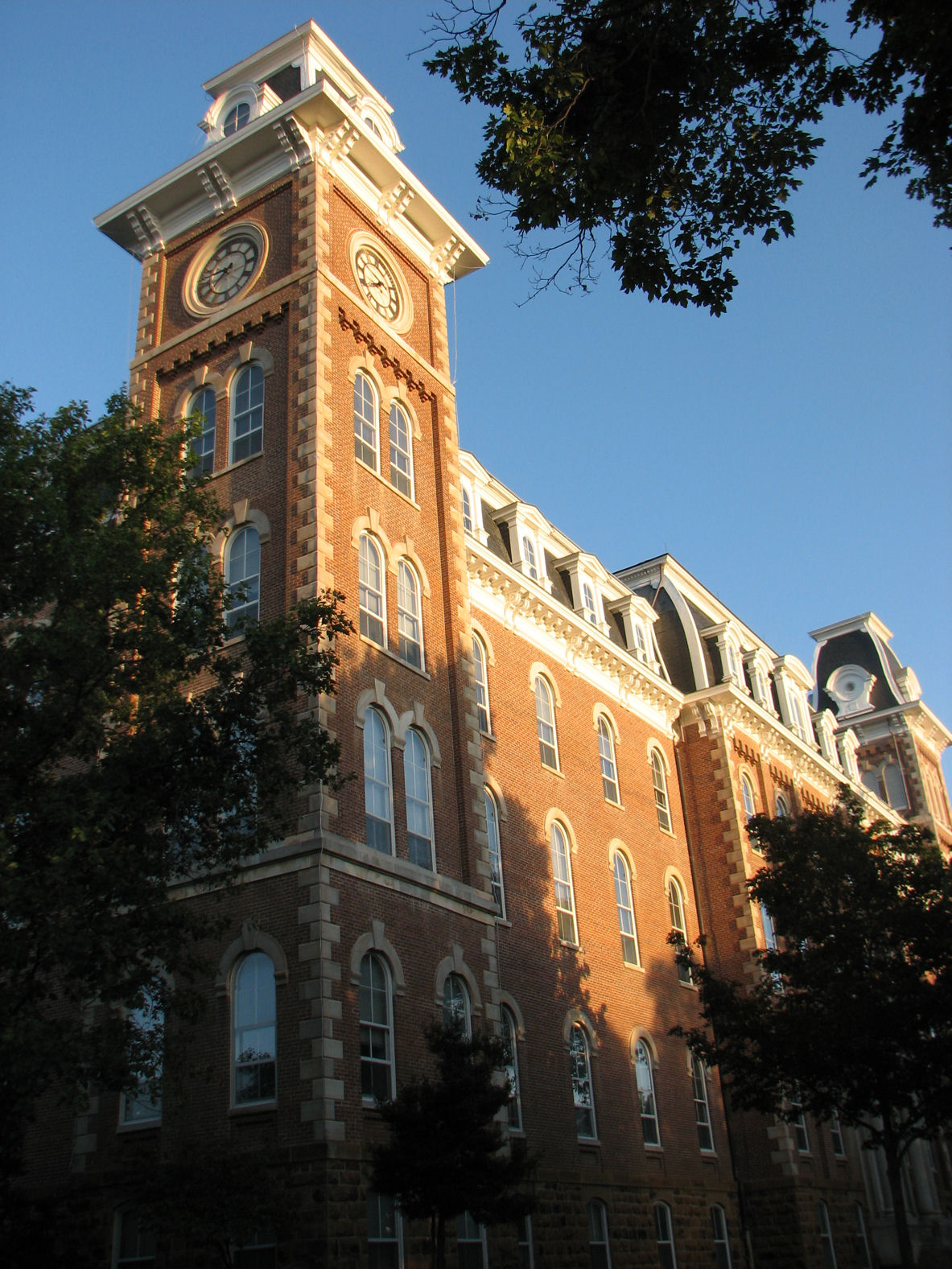
- Old Main in 2007, with the recently added south tower clock face
- Location: Fayetteville, Arkansas
- Coordinates: 36°04′07″N 94°10′18″W
- Built: 1875
- Architect: John Mills Van Osdel
- Architectural style: Second Empire
- NRHP reference No.: 70000131
- Added to NRHP: June 15, 1970

Old Main is the oldest building on the University of Arkansas campus in Fayetteville, Arkansas. It is one of the most recognizable symbols of the university (especially to alumni and residents of the state of Arkansas), and of higher education in general in Arkansas.

== History ==
Old Main was constructed between 1873 and 1875 as part of a land grant for the state of Arkansas. At this time it was known as University Hall. It was designed by Chicago architect John Mills Van Osdel, and construction was carried out by William Mayes of the firm of Mayes and Oliver. G. N. Wright was one of the contractors. In 1873, the University of Arkansas purchased Van Osdel's plans for the University Hall at the University of Illinois at Urbana-Champaign (demolished in 1938) and erected an identical structure.

The contract to construct the Hall was signed by the superintendent of public instruction, Joseph Carter Corbin, who was the highest elected African American official in Arkansas during Reconstruction.

Most of the building materials used in Old Main came from local areas, because the nearest river port was 60 miles away and the nearest railroad was 150 miles away. 136 miles of lumber came by oxen-drawn wagons from the Peter Van Winkle Sawmill near historic War Eagle Mill in Benton County. The red exterior bricks were made from clay dug on campus and fired in kilns built west of Old Main. The brown sandstone used for the foundation and basement was also quarried from near the building site. The five-story building contained 2,600,000 bricks when originally constructed.

After nearly a hundred years of use, Old Main had fallen into disrepair, and in 1981 the building was closed for safety reasons. After a considerable period of debate over whether to restore the old building or tear it down, restoration work began in the summer of 1989 and Old Main was renovated extensively. The renovation proceeded ahead of schedule, and it was finished during the spring semester of 1991 at a cost of $10 million. It was rededicated during the Fall of 1991. The architects of the renovation were Mott, Mobley, McGowan & Griffin of Fort Smith, with preservation architect John K. Mott as the partner in charge.

Prior to the extensive restoration of 1986–1991, the building was fondly remembered for its large, open, and decorative central stairwell. However, this stairwell effectively formed a chimney which violated any number of building codes to which the renovated building would have to conform. To preserve the stairwell's appearance and function while still conforming to modern safety standards, an innovative automated fire protection system was installed which would slide out and close protective fire doors from concealed storage areas on each floor, effectively sealing the stairwell off.

In the original building, stairwells were also sited at either end of the central "shotgun" hallway. These were closed off during the 1986–1991 restoration. Additional stairwells were sited at the ends of the wings, again to conform to building codes.

The original 19th century Corinthian iron columns, featured prominently in almost all photographs of Old Main's wings, remain in place to this day. To conform to building codes, all but one floor's worth have been reinforced with welded steel and encased in fireproof boxes.

The original columns in Giffels Auditorium were preserved in the renovation process. In order to preserve these columns while still conforming to building codes, they needed to be rendered non-structural. The north wing of the building was therefore completely reconstructed such that loads are carried by the walls instead of the columns. The distinctive "inset" look of the windows of the modern Giffels auditorium are a result of this restructuring and reinforcement.

In 2005 the building underwent another round of renovations. At that time, it received a new roof, aging mortar was replaced, and a clock face was installed in the south tower.

During its history, Old Main has housed many different departments and served many different administrative functions. It currently houses the offices of the J. William Fulbright College of Arts and Sciences, its honors program and five academic departments, as well as classrooms and meeting spaces.

== Architectural features ==
The north tower stands 130 feet tall and the south tower stands 123 feet tall. The front doors of the building still retain their original hinges. The cornerstone of the building lists its original cost in 1871 dollars, $186,000. The sweeping stairwell leading to the attic of the building found at the center of the top floor is original to the structure. The walls of the rooms in the central "shotgun" hallway are structural and largely conform to the plan of the original building. The cast-iron sides of the seats in the Giffels auditorium are supposedly cast from original molds.

=== Arboretum ===
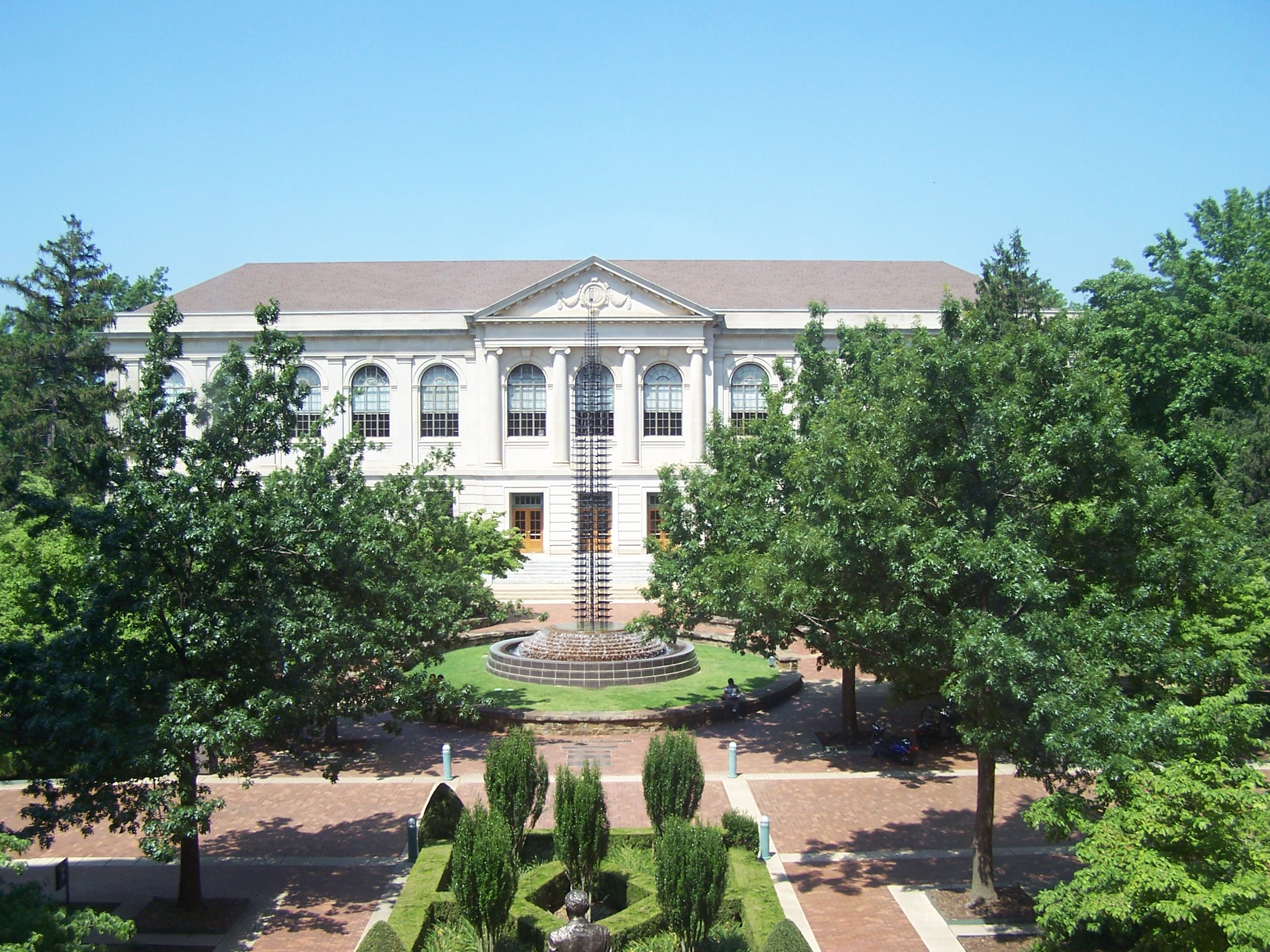
View from top floor of Old Main, looking at the J. William Fulbright Peace Fountain in front of Vol Walker Hall.

The arboretum (the large lawn area in front of Old Main) is a home to several of Arkansas's native trees and once used to be a training ground for military officers when military tactics were taught at the university. It also served as a place where the band would march and play. Today, the band practices in Baum East (a parking lot on campus), and the arboretum is simply a green space where students can study, play games, or simply stroll through and enjoy.

=== James William Fulbright statue ===
In 2002, a statue of former student, law faculty member, president of the university, congressman, senator, and namesake of the college housed in Old Main, J. William Fulbright, was erected in the rear courtyard of the building. President Bill Clinton gave a much-anticipated speech at the dedication ceremony.

=== Bells ===
In 1879, the first official bell for Old Main was installed. That bell still exists today, but is no longer in regular use. The last two times it was used was when it rang 10 times in 1985 to mark the $10 million received through donations for the restoration process and in July 1989 to mark the beginning of renovation. Electronic bells were installed during 1949, and dedicated to those students lost in any war. These bells wore out and were replaced with a computerized bell device. It plays the Westminster Chimes every hour from 8 am - 8 pm and the alma mater every day at six A.M. and again at five P.M.

=== Senior Walk ===
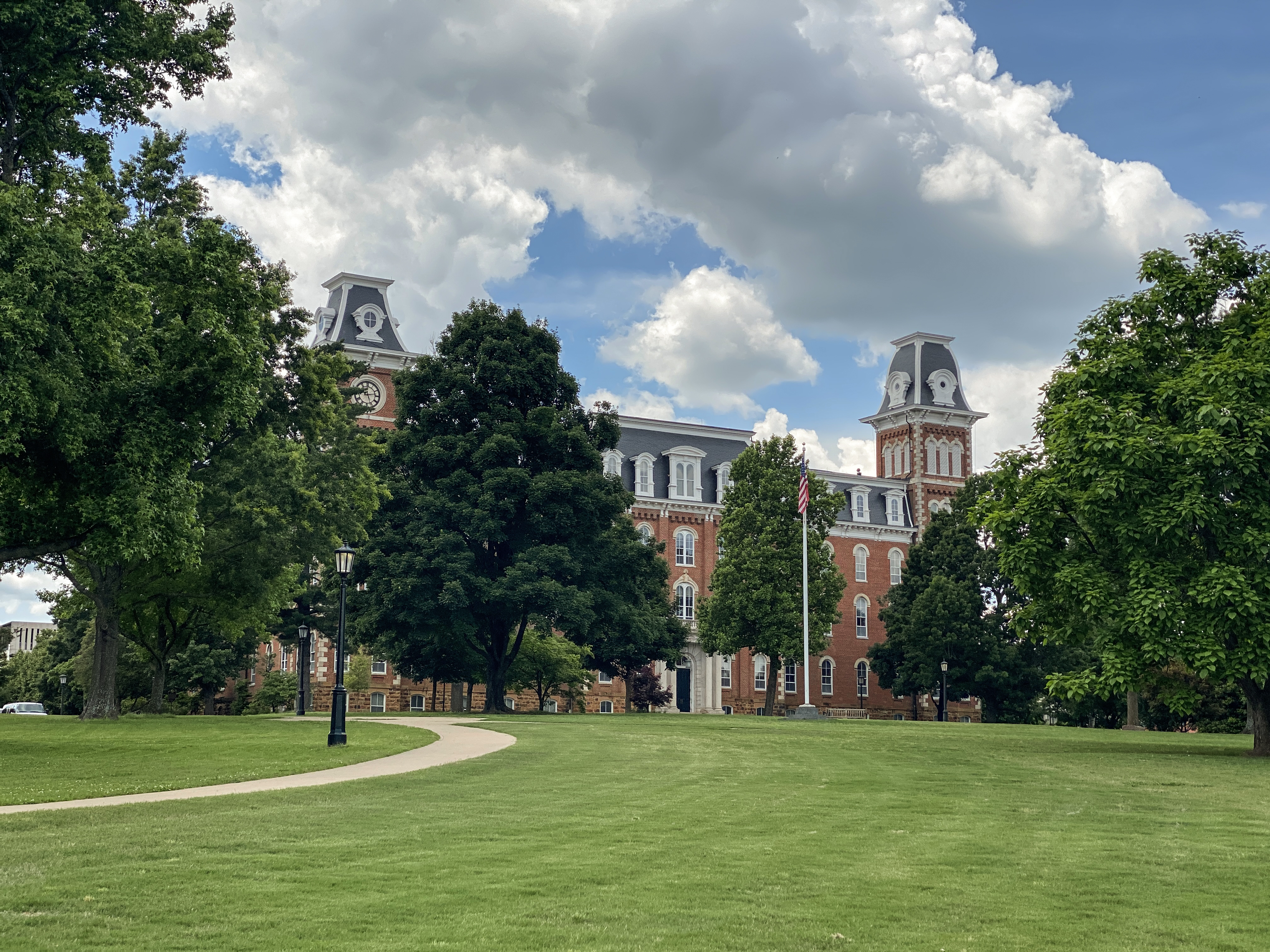
Old Main from the front side where Senior Walk begins.

Senior Walk is a tradition unique to the University of Arkansas. Senior Walk was established in 1905 by president John Tillman. Each year, all graduates have their name carved into the sidewalk that circles, and cuts through campus. The walk begins directly in front of Old Main with the first graduating class, of 1876.

=== Clock ===
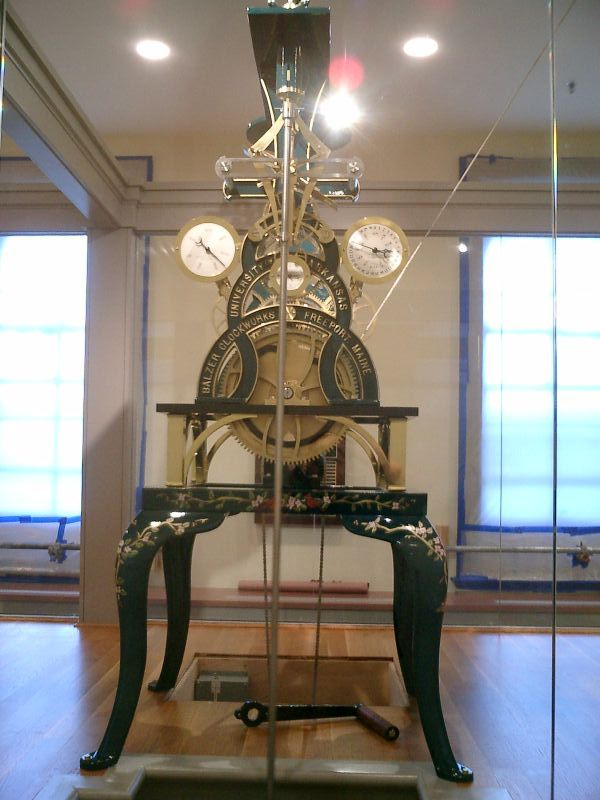
Clock Mechanism on display on Fourth floor of Old Main

The south tower was originally designed to have a clock, however, one was not installed until the 2005 renovation. Although there was no clock face, the building did have a bell in the opposite tower that rang every hour and half-hour and could be heard all over campus, as well as most of downtown Fayetteville and surrounding areas. When President Bill Clinton gave a much-anticipated speech at the J. William Fulbright statue dedication ceremony, Clinton asked Chancellor John A. White, "Where is the clock?" Three years later, Old Main received a clock face.

On October 27, 2005, after more than 130 years without a functioning clock face, a specially constructed clock was completed and dedicated on the South Tower. This was in celebration of reaching a "Campaign for Twenty-First Century" campaign goal of $1 billion and also included the replacement of aging mortar between bricks, replacing the roof, and other minor aesthetic improvements to the building.
