= John A. White =

Chancellor of the University of Arkansas

John A. White Jr.
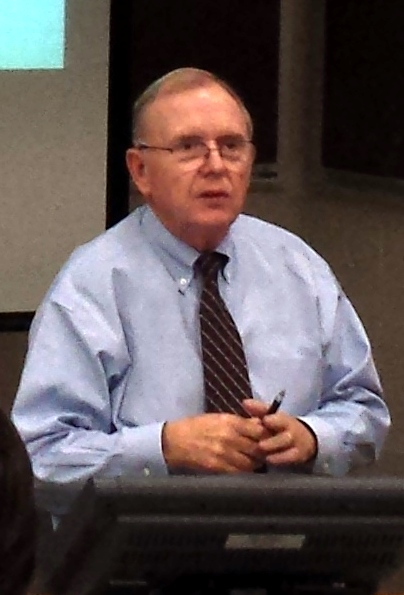
- John White at the University of Arkansas

4th Chancellor of the University of Arkansas
- In office 1997–2008
- Preceded by: Daniel E. Ferritor
- Succeeded by: G. David Gearhart

Personal details
- Born: December 5, 1939 (age 86) Portland, Arkansas, U.S.
- Spouse: Mary Elizabeth Quarles White
- Children: 2
- Education: University of Arkansas; Virginia Tech; Ohio State University
- Profession: Distinguished professor of industrial engineering and chancellor emeritus, University of Arkansas

John Austin White Jr. (born December 5, 1939) is an American academic who was the fourth chancellor of the University of Arkansas. He succeeded Daniel Ferritor in 1997 after previously serving as the dean of Georgia Institute of Technology's College of Engineering. As chancellor, White transformed the University of Arkansas; including the $1 billion "Campaign for the 21st Century" capital campaign, which created the University of Arkansas Honors College, endowed the University of Arkansas Graduate School and UA Libraries, added 132 tenured faculty, 1738 scholarships and fellowships, funded millions of dollars of brick and mortar improvements, and grew the university by almost every academic statistic. Since his departure from the chancellor's office in 2008, White has remained at the university, teaching in the industrial engineering department.

== University of Arkansas ==
"In the future, I believe historians will identify this day as a defining moment, an inflection point, a turning point, for the University of Arkansas. Today, we send a message, loud and clear, to the nation’s best universities: move over! The University of Arkansas is joining your ranks; it will stand equally, shoulder to shoulder, with the best universities this nation has to offer!"

— John White, announcing the Campaign for the 21st Century on October 26, 2001

White left his job as dean of Georgia Institute of Technology's College of Engineering in order to become chancellor at his alma mater, the University of Arkansas in 1997. Promising to be an agent of change, White worked to shift the focus of the institution onto academics, including research and knowledge-based careers the state would need to compete in the global economy. Under his leadership, the university embarked on the "Campaign for the 21st Century", an ambitious capital campaign initially set for a goal of $500 million, despite having a total endowment of only $119 million in 1997.

The Campaign for the Twenty-First Century allowed for the creation of the University of Arkansas Honors College, while endowing University Libraries and the University of Arkansas Graduate School. In the classroom, 132 faculty positions were endowed and 1,738 scholarships and fellowships were added. New donors accounted for a significant portion of the Campaign, with 41,600 of 72,641 total donors giving to UA academics for their first time. Benefactors made 304,328 individual gifts and pledges by the campaign's end in 2005. The largest gift was $300 million, pledged by the Walton Family Charitable Support Foundation, the largest gift in the history of public education philanthropy at the time. White and his wife contributed $1.5 million to endow a systems integration chair in industrial engineering department.

== Honors ==
In 1987, White was elected a member of the National Academy of Engineering for "the creative development of engineering principles and computational procedures used in the design and analysis of material handling systems".

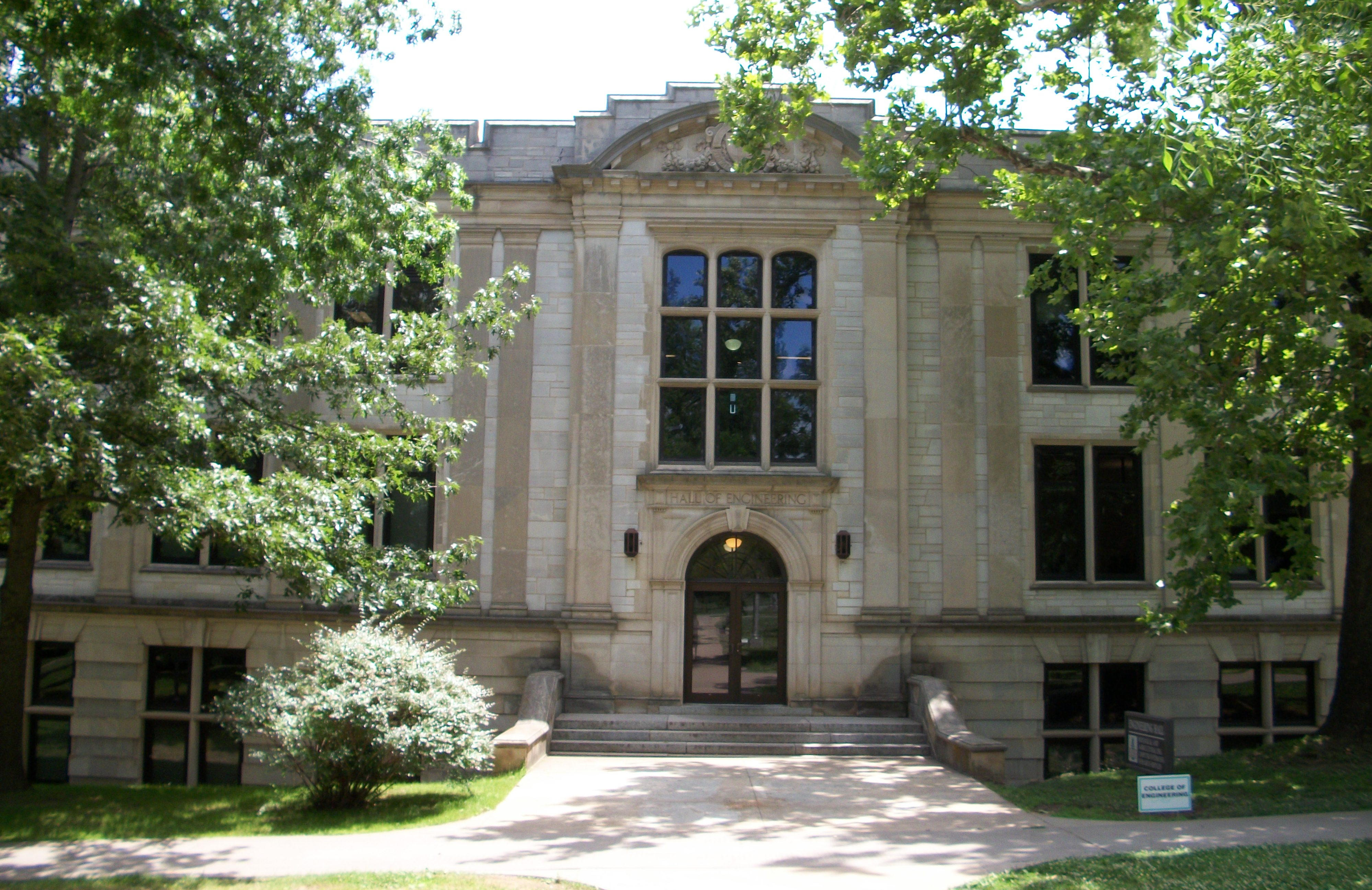
John A. White Jr. Engineering Hall on the University of Arkansas campus

White was elected to the 2002 class of Fellows of the Institute for Operations Research and the Management Sciences. He was named to the Virginia Tech Academy of Engineering Excellence in 2011.

In 2012, Engineering Hall was renamed "John A. White Jr. Engineering Hall" in honor of White. The collegiate gothic structure was originally completed in 1925 and is listed on the National Register of Historic Places as a contributing property in the University of Arkansas Campus Historic District.

He was given honorary doctorates by George Washington University and the Katholieke Universiteit Leuven.

== Personal ==
Born in Portland, Arkansas on December 5, 1939, and a 1957 high school graduate of Harrison, Arkansas, White is married to the former Mary Elizabeth Quarles, whom he married in 1963. They have two children and four grandchildren. His son, John A. White III, is president and CEO of a facility logistics company.

== Education ==
He received his Bachelor of Science in Industrial Engineering (B.S.I.E.) in 1962 from the University of Arkansas, Fayetteville, Arkansas, received his Master of Science in Industrial Engineering, (M.S.I.E.) in 1966 from Virginia Tech, Blacksburg, Virginia, and his Doctor of Philosophy (Ph.D.) in 1969 from The Ohio State University, Columbus, Ohio.

== See also ==
- John A. White Jr. Engineering Hall
- List of University of Arkansas people
