= University of Arkansas Chemistry Building =

Historic chemistry building at University of Arkansas

- Chemistry Building-University of Arkansas, Fayetteville
- U.S. National Register of Historic Places
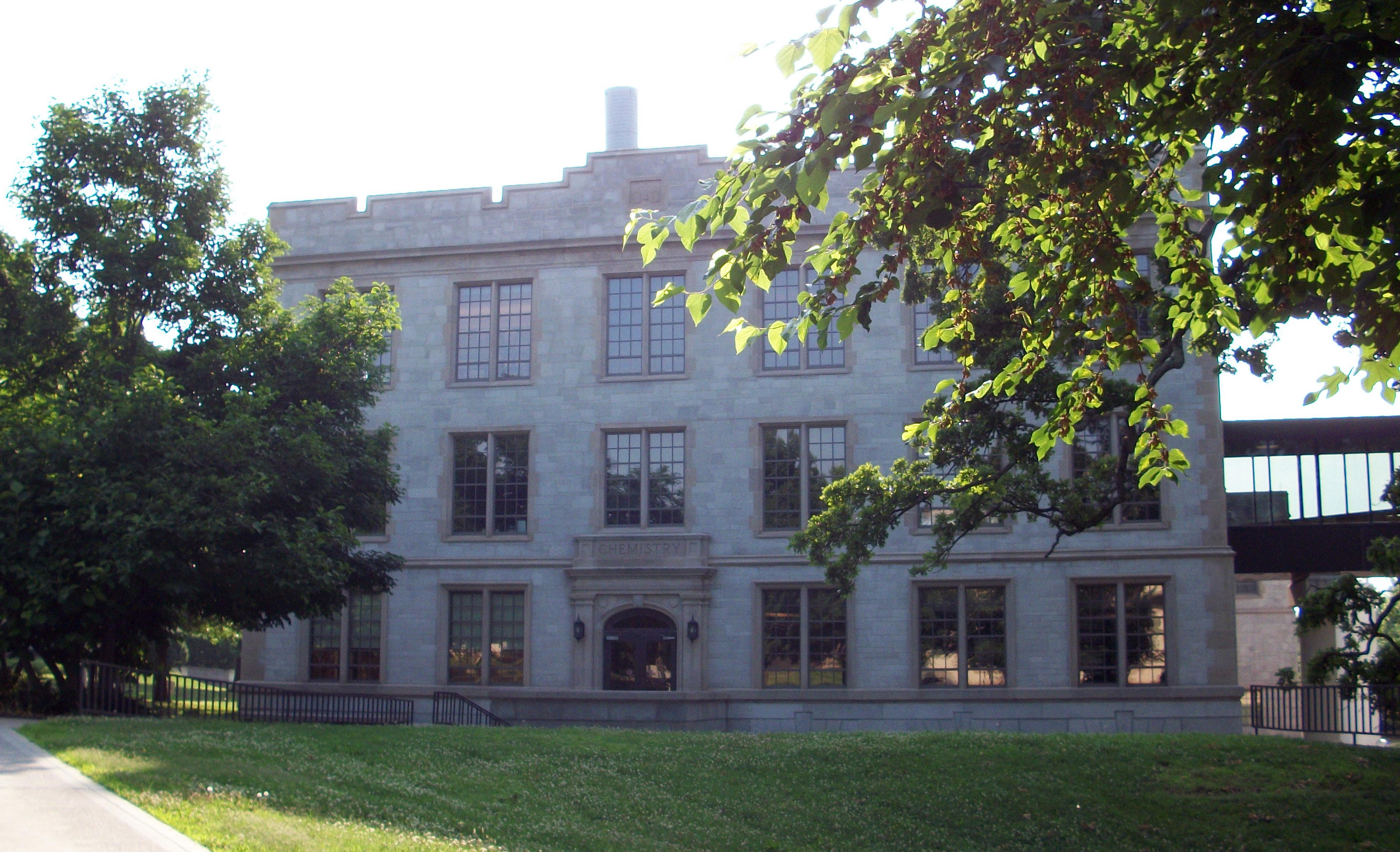
- West entrance of the building. It is connected to a new wing by a skywalk (on the right side of the image.)

- Location within Arkansas Location within the United States
- Location: Campus Dr., Fayetteville, Arkansas
- Coordinates: 36°4′4″N 94°10′22″W
- Area: 1.8 acres (0.73 ha)
- Built: 1935
- Architect: Wittenberg & Delony
- Architectural style: Collegiate Gothic
- MPS: Public Schools in the Ozarks MPS
- NRHP reference No.: 92001100
- Added to NRHP: September, 1992

The Chemistry Building at the University of Arkansas is a building on the University's campus in Fayetteville, Arkansas. The building was added to the National Register of Historic Places in 1992.

== History ==
Although there was already a chemistry building on campus, by 1925 it had become too small. There were plans to build a new building by the Arkansas General Assembly in 1927, and it was scheduled to be built in 1931. However, the Great Depression delayed these plans.

In January 1934, $1,165,000 was made available for the construction of both a new chemistry building and the Vol Walker Library. These funds came from the Public Works Administration, and not the Arkansas legislature.

Opened in December 1935, the building housed the chemistry, zoology, geology, philosophy, and psychology departments. Eventually, the growing University forced all of these departments elsewhere except for chemistry. In 1992, the University added another chemistry building adjacent to this one, connected with a skywalk.

== See also ==
- National Register of Historic Places listings in Washington County, Arkansas
