= Gearhart Hall =

- Business Administration Building-University of Arkansas, Fayetteville
- U.S. National Register of Historic Places
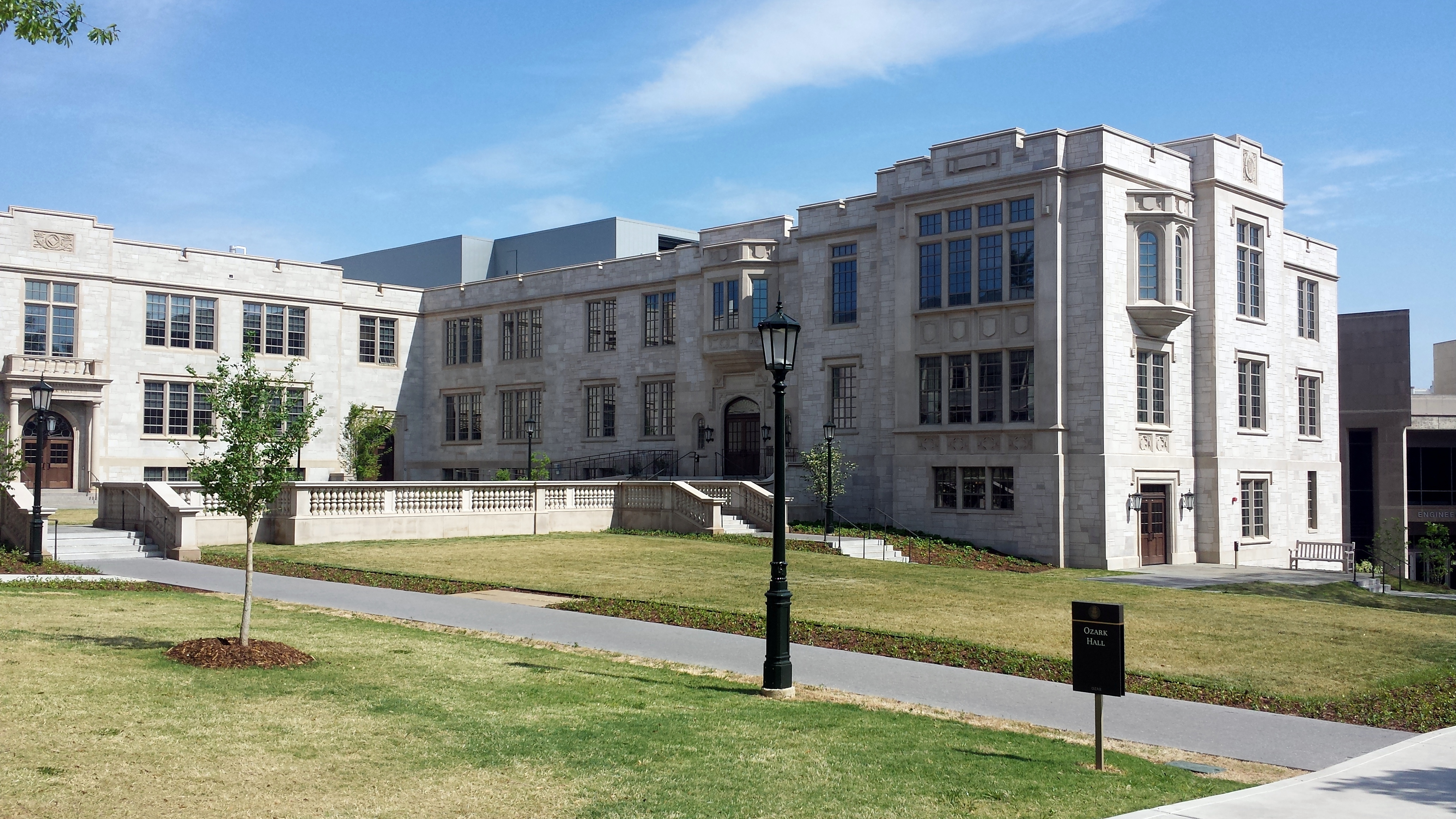

- Location within Arkansas Location within the United States
- Location: Campus Dr., Fayetteville, Arkansas
- Coordinates: 36°4′3″N 94°10′15″W
- Area: 1.8 acres (0.73 ha)
- Built: 1940
- Architect: Haralson & Mott, Mann & Wanger
- Architectural style: Collegiate Gothic
- MPS: Public Schools in the Ozarks MPS
- NRHP reference No.: 92001099
- Added to NRHP: September 4, 1992

Gearhart Hall at the University of Arkansas is a building on the university's campus in Fayetteville, Arkansas. The building was added to the National Register of Historic Places in 1992.

== History ==
Gearhart Hall was built in 1935 as "Classroom Building" with two other structures: the Home Economics Building and the old Student Union. Using Indiana Limestone, the building was finished in 1940 by the Manhattan Construction Company of Muskogee, OK. It initially held faculty only. The Commerce Building was finished in 1947, and the two buildings were connected. It was at this time that the structure was named the Business Administration Building. Five other departments were also housed in this building until the namesake moved out in 1978 to a new Business Building on Ozark Avenue. It was then renamed Ozark Hall, which it remained named until 2015. In 1987, the Commerce Building-portion was razed. The building then came to house the Graduate School, the department of geosciences, and the nursing program. In December 2015, Ozark Hall was renamed Gearhart Hall to honor G. David Gearhart, the fifth and former chancellor of the university.

== Renovation project ==
Gearhart Hall was expanded over the approximate location of the old Commerce Building. The three-year project, designed by Robert A.M. Stern Architects was completed in 2014. The new wing houses the Honors College and a few classrooms. As part of the expansion, the remaining classrooms also received restoration and updating.

== See also ==
- National Register of Historic Places listings in Washington County, Arkansas
