= University of Arkansas Agriculture Building =

- Agriculture Building-University of Arkansas, Fayetteville
- U.S. National Register of Historic Places
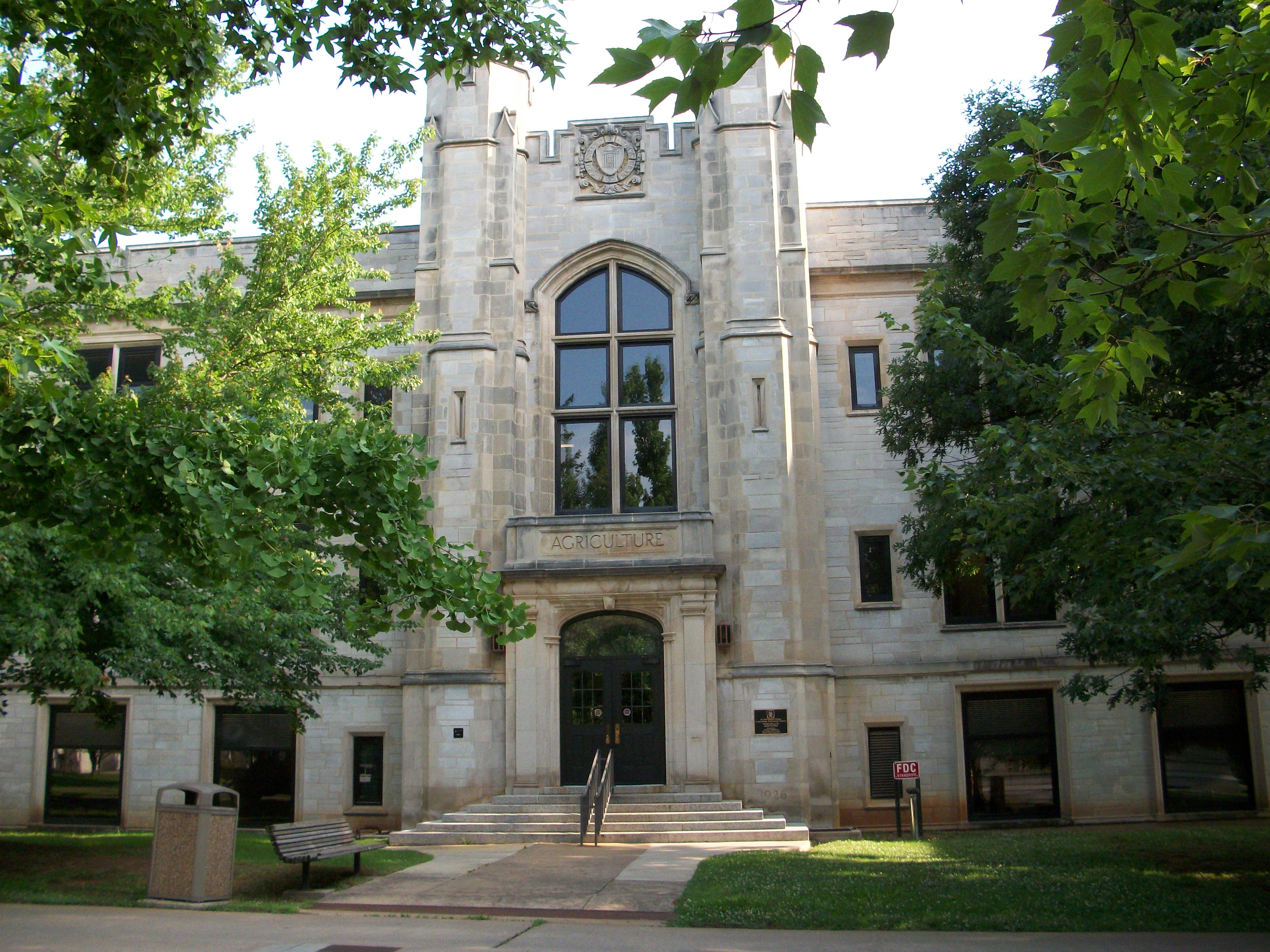

- Location within Arkansas Location within the United States
- Location: Campus Dr., Fayetteville, Arkansas
- Coordinates: 36°4′9″N 94°10′22″W
- Area: 1.8 acres (0.73 ha)
- Built: 1927
- Architect: Jamieson & Spearl, H. Ray Burks
- Architectural style: Collegiate Gothic
- MPS: Public Schools in the Ozarks MPS
- NRHP reference No.: 92001098
- Added to NRHP: September, 1992

The Agriculture Building at the University of Arkansas is a building on the university's campus in Fayetteville, Arkansas. The building was added to the National Register of Historic Places in 1992.

== History ==
The Agriculture Building and Engineering Building were both built using the same funding from the Arkansas Legislature. Completed in 1927, the Agriculture Building hosted a library, the agronomy, horticulture, plant pathology, rural economics and sociology, and entomology departments, in addition to offices. A new Plant Pathology building was built in 1978, taking some of the aforementioned departments. The two buildings are connected by a skywalk. It now contains the agribusiness and economics, agricultural and extension education, agricultural communications, and entomology departments.

== See also ==
- National Register of Historic Places listings in Washington County, Arkansas
