= University of Arkansas Graduate School and International Education =

Graduate program at the University of Arkansas

University of Arkansas Graduate School
- Type: graduate school
- Established: 1927
- Parent institution: University of Arkansas
- Dean: Patricia R. Koski
- Postgraduates: 4354(Fall 2020)
- Other students: 1211 (International Students, Fall 2020)
- Location: Fayetteville, Arkansas, U.S.
- Campus: University of Arkansas
- Website: grad.uark.edu

The Graduate School at the University of Arkansas is a center for postgraduate education at that University. It offers over 140 programs through six of the colleges at the University of Arkansas. The University of Arkansas Graduate School is a member of the Conference of Southern Graduate Schools, Council of Graduate Schools, and Arkansas Department of Higher Education.
