= Razorback Transit =

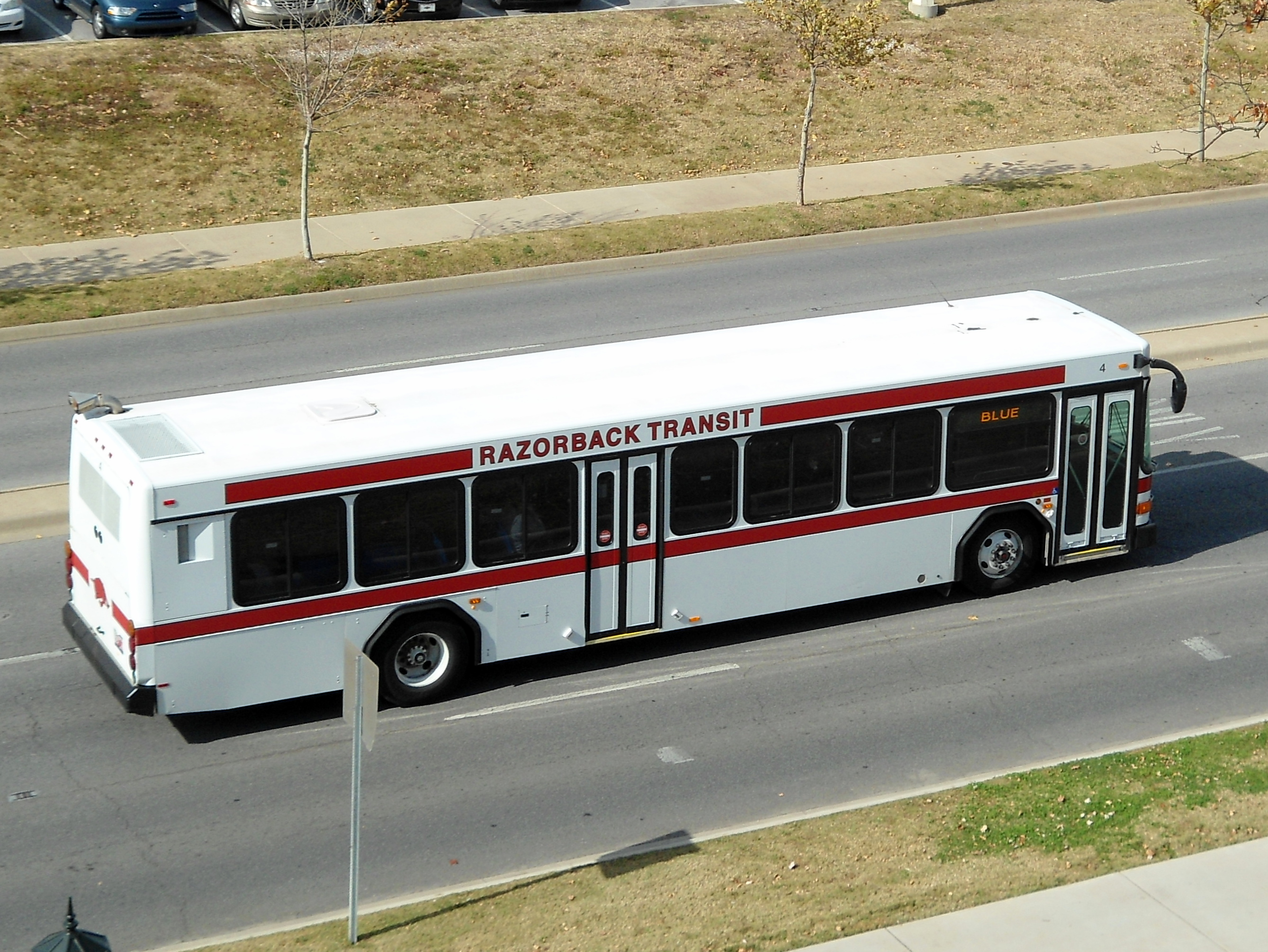
- A Razorback Transit bus in service, November 2012
- Parent: Arkansas Department of Transportation
- Founded: 1980 (University of Arkansas Transit); 1989 (Razorback Transit)
- Headquarters: 155 Razorback Road; Fayetteville, AR 72701
- Locale: Fayetteville, Arkansas
- Service area: Washington County, Arkansas
- Service type: Fixed route bus, paratransit
- Routes: 19 (11 standard, 6 reduced, 2 special)
- Destinations: Donald W. Reynolds Razorback Stadium, Northwest Arkansas Mall, Dickson Street, residence halls, educational buildings
- Stations: Union Station
- Fleet: 24 buses, 6 cutaway vans
- Annual ridership: 953,241 (2022)
- Fuel type: Diesel fuel
- Associate Director: Adam Waddell
- Website: Razorback Transit

The University of Arkansas Razorback Transit System operates 19 routes (11 standard fixed routes, 6 reduced routes, 2 Razorback football gameday routes) on the campus and vicinity of the University. Razorback Transit provides both fixed route bus and paratransit service. All service is free. Standard service includes eleven fixed routes serving the campus of the University of Arkansas in addition to other destinations within Fayetteville, Arkansas.

== History ==
The first bus system serving on the University of Arkansas campus was a private operation called the University-City Bus Service. It ran a bus between campus and the Fayetteville Square on a fixed schedule during the early 1950s. In 1966, the university's Associated Student Government appointed a transit committee to make recommendations regarding an on-campus transit system. Growth in the number of students living off-campus meant more students were driving to campus, but new parking lots to serve them were further away from the central academic buildings. The committee surveyed students and found that 70 percent said they would use a transit system. The chair of the committee, "Mack" McLarty, became president of the student government during the 1967-68 school year, and he launched a trial transit system using shuttles.

The shuttle vehicles were traded for repurposed school buses by the mid-1970s that primarily provided rides from outlying parking lots to the center of campus. In 1980, the Facilities Management office overseeing the transit operation acquired five more buses and established five fixed routes. This system was named the University of Arkansas Transit and almost fell victim to budget cuts in 1988. The system asked for federal assistance and was reborn as Razorback Transit in 1989. An $8 student transit fee was assessed beginning during the 1999-2000 school year to fund the campus routes. The federal assistance allowed Razorback Transit to extend its routes beyond campus to serve Fayetteville, especially parts of town with higher density of college students living in apartments.

== Service ==
Service is provided Monday through Friday from 7:00 am to 6:00 pm on all class days during fall and spring semesters. Reduced service is provided from 6:00 pm to 10:30 pm during these days. Bus service is provided from 7:00 am to 10:30 pm on Saturday, with no Sunday service during the fall and spring semesters. No normal bus routes are run on home football game weekends (all buses are used for Gold and Silver routes to/from Donald W. Reynolds Razorback Stadium) and all services are closed on official University holidays.

Reduced service is offered during the summer from 7:00 am to 6:00 pm.

=== Buses ===
All buses in the Razorback Transit system are air-conditioned and possess wheelchair lifts. Razorback Transit began replacing its fleet in 2010 when it purchased three 2010 40 feet (12 m) Orion International low floor buses, with four low floor models ordered from the Gillig Corporation to be delivered in the following years. The new buses are usually used for the longer routes, such as the Red, Blue, and Tan routes.

=== Union Station ===
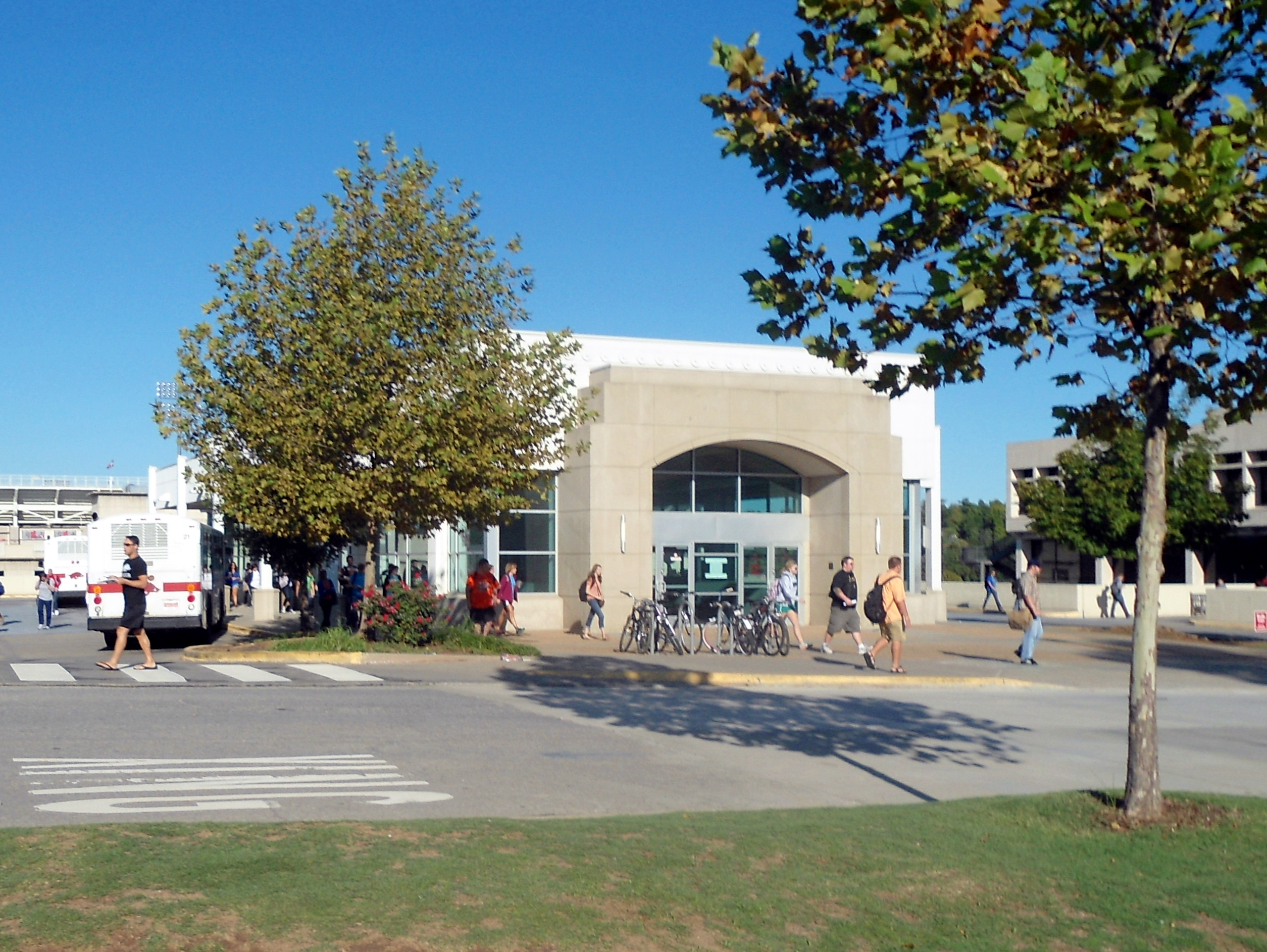
Union Station, September 2012

Almost all bus routes begin and end at Union Station, which is located atop the Stadium Drive Parking Garage. This garage is attached to The Arkansas Union by a short walkway. Union Station contains an indoor area for users to wait for buses, view maps of the bus system, or access vending machines. Elevators provide access to the four floors of parking underneath the station.

Access to Union Station is restricted by gates on Garland Avenue which restrict traffic from entering the heart of campus. Only buses and officially authorized personnel are able to open the gates using a radio transmitter.

== Standard service ==
All Razorback Transit buses are equipped with live GPS tracking equipment that is accessible to the public via https://campusmap.uark.edu

=== Blue route ===
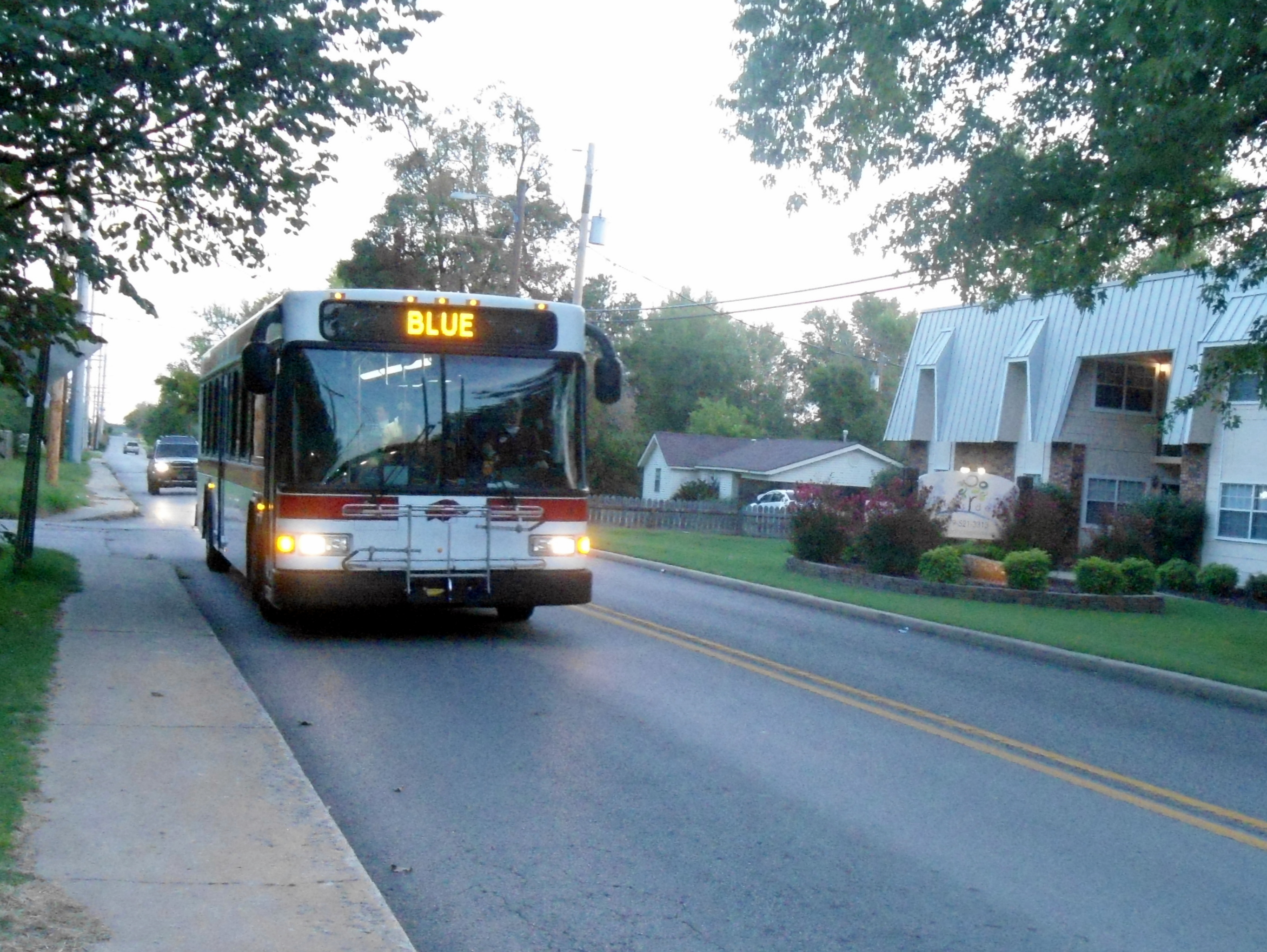
A Blue bus stops at North Creekside Apartments

Station Street traveled	Direction	Connections
Union Station	Southbound terminus, northbound station	Razorback Transit: Brown, Green, Orange, Purple, Red, Remote Express, Tan
Plant Sciences Maple Street	Northbound	
Leverett and Maple	Southbound	
South Creekside Leverett Avenue	Bidirectional	
Colonial Arms Leverett Avenue	Bidirectional	
Noble Oaks	Bidirectional	
North Creekside	Bidirectional	Razorback Transit: Red
Leverett and Melmar	Bidirectional	Razorback Transit: Red
Garland Heights Melmar Drive	Bidirectional	
Crafton Place Garland Avenue	Northbound	
Abernathy Drive	Northbound	
Food Science	Northbound	
Fair Park	Southbound	
Biomass	Southbound	Ozark Regional Transit: Route 490
Notes: 1. The route loops around the University of Arkansas Agricultural Extension campus bus stops and returns to Union Station on the same route.

=== Brown route ===
Station Street traveled	Direction	Connections
Union Station	Westbound terminus, eastbound station	Razorback Transit: Blue, Green, Orange, Purple, Red, Remote Express, Tan
Plant Sciences Maple Street	Eastbound	Razorback Transit: Blue
Leverett and Maple	Westbound	Razorback Transit: Blue
Graduate Education Maple Street	Eastbound	
Maple/West	Bidirectional	
Walton Arts Center West Avenue	Bidirectional	Razorback Transit: Downtown, Route 13; Ozark Regional Transit: Route 4
Hillcrest Towers/Housing Authority School Ave	Bidirectional	Razorback Transit: Downtown; Ozark Regional Transit: Routes 1, 2, 4
Fayetteville Public Library School Ave	Eastbound	Razorback Transit: Downtown; Ozark Regional Transit: Routes 1, 2
Downtown Square Mountain Street	Eastbound	Razorback Transit: Downtown; Ozark Regional Transit: Routes 1, 2
Notes: 1. The route loops around the Fayetteville Library and Downtown Square bus stop and returns to Union Station on the same route.

=== Gray route ===
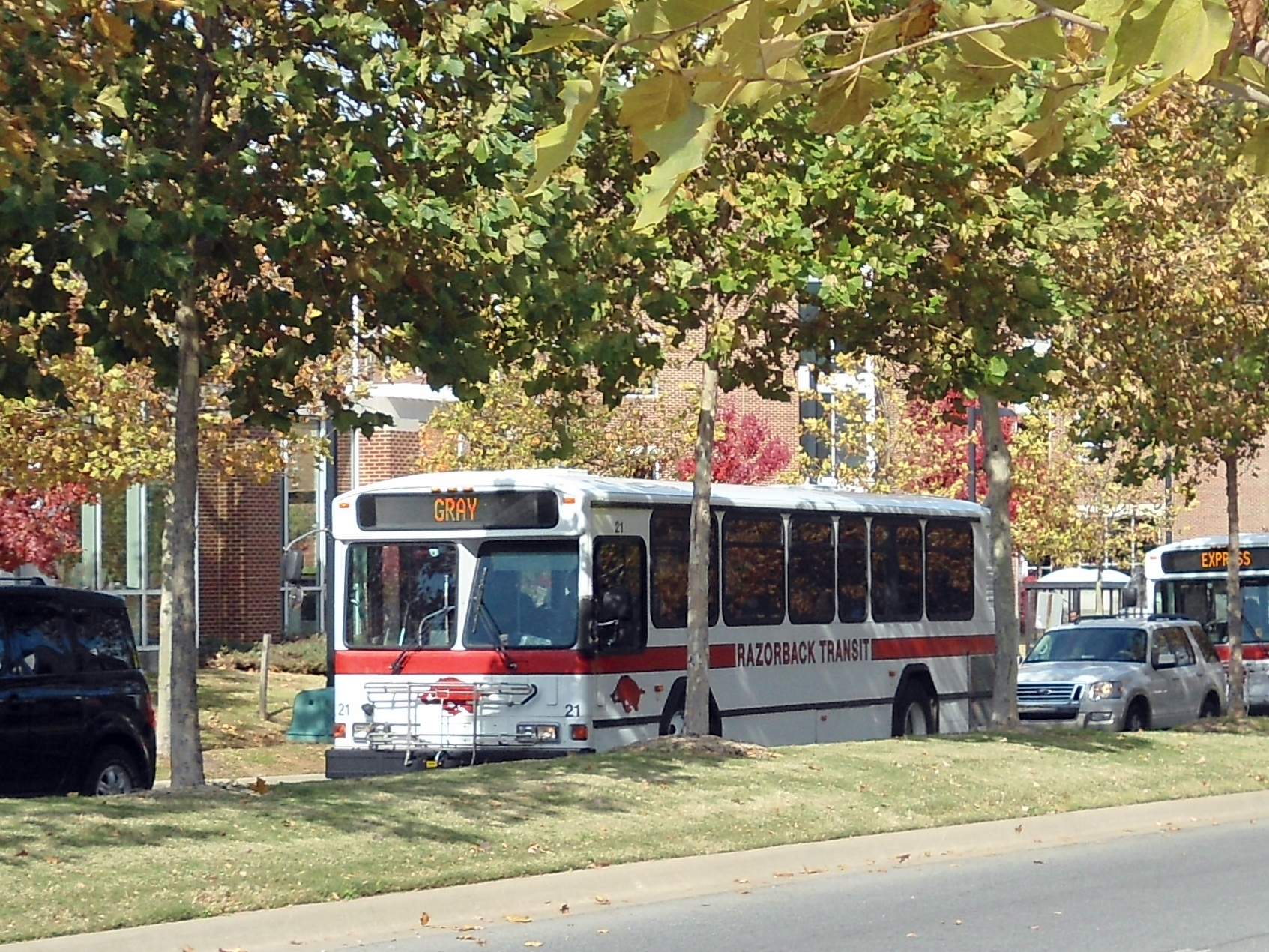
The Gray route returns to Union Station via Garland Avenue

The Gray route begins at Union Station and runs north along Garland Avenue to stop at Oak Plaza and further north the Crafton Place Apartments. It continues along Arkansas Highway 112 before turning onto Cassatt Street to stop at the Food Science research center. The route now returns, stopping at the Abernathy Center (the biological and agricultural engineering research center) before returning to AR 112 northbound. It briefly runs on Drake Street before stopping at the Fair Park Apartments, the Biomass research center, and the Archeological survey center. Now traveling south on Highway 112 (Garland) the Gray route picks up the last half of the Blue route starting at Maria H. and continuing south on Leverett Ave. before reaching campus and terminating at Union Station.

=== Green route ===
The Green bus exits Union Station to the south, stopping first at Brough Commons before descending the hill. At Pomfret Hall the route stops again before winding along Clinton Street. The route makes two stops at Lot 56 before turning onto Razorback Road heading north. The Green route makes stops at John McDonnell Field and Donald W. Reynolds Razorback Stadium before returning to Union Station along Maple Street.

=== Purple route ===
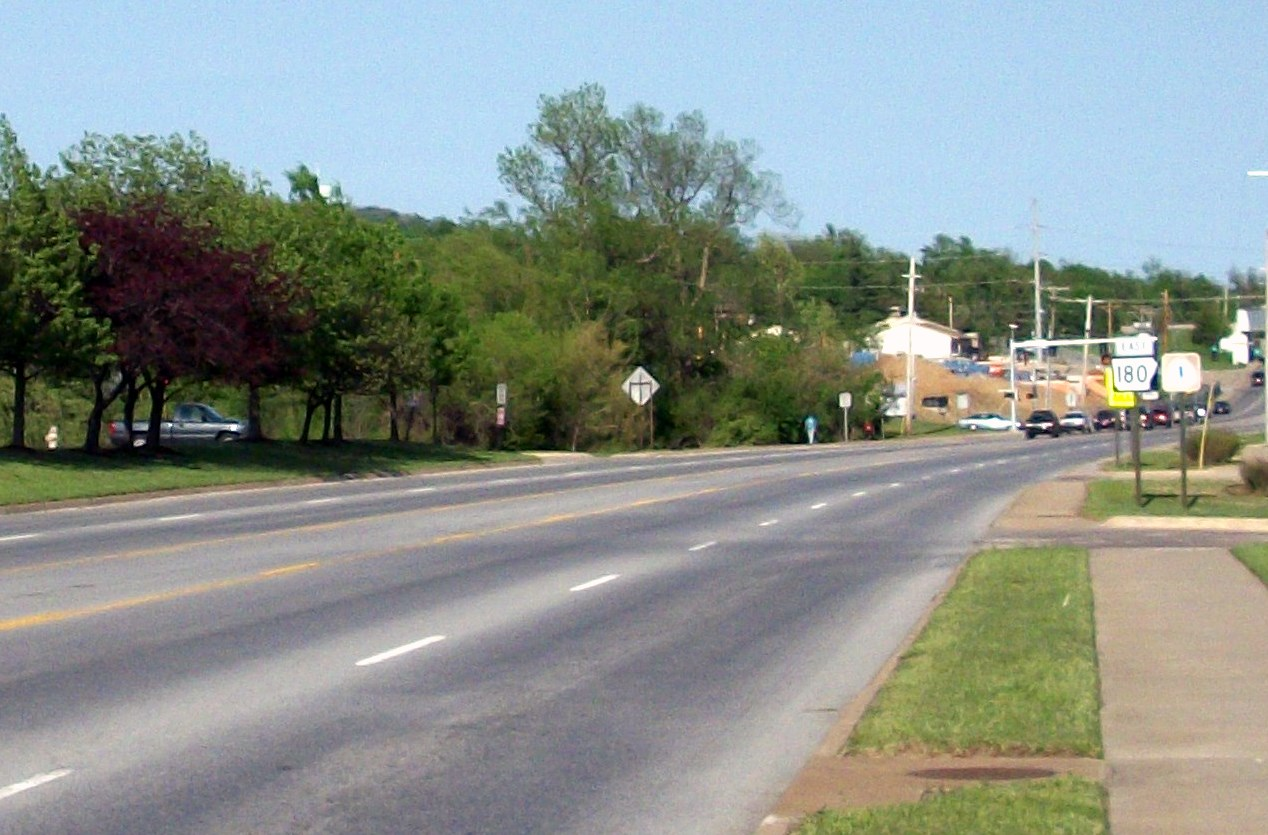
Many of Razorback Transit's routes utilize Martin Luther King Jr. Boulevard (Arkansas Highway 180), a main east–west artery in Fayetteville, Arkansas.

The Purple route exits the Union Station to the north and turns left onto Maple Street. It turns south onto Razorback Road to cross MLK Boulevard. Further south of this intersection the bus makes its first stop at the Stadium Apartments/Arkansas Revenue Office. The bus continues briefly south before stopping at Baum Stadium near the Randal Tyson Track Center. It continues south before turning west to stop at the southern side of Baum Stadium and the Tyson Track Center. The next stop is the Spectrum Apartments before the Purple turns north onto Futrall Drive and begins to parallel Interstate 49/US Route 71. After again crossing MLK Boulevard, the route turns right onto Stone Street. The bus stops next at the Southern View Apartments, the Red Roof Inn, Ramay Junior High School, and the intersection of Old Farmington Road/Sang Avenue. The route continues east onto MLK Boulevard towards campus, entering campus on Razorback Road. Continuing north, the route stops at John McDonnell Field before returning to the station.

=== Red route ===
The Red bus route is the longest in the system, taking one hour to complete each cycle. The bus begins its route at Union Station and departs north along Garland Avenue. It first stops at Oak Plaza/EZ Mart before stopping at the intersection of Garland Avenue and Sycamore Street. Further north on Garland Avenue the Red route stops at the Crafton Place Apartments before stopping at Fair Park apartments and then briefly running on Interstate 540/US 71. After exiting at exit 67, the route serves the Washington Regional Medical Center, the Washington County Health Department, and Collier Drug Store.

Further along its route the Red bus stops at the intersection of Millsap Road and Plainview Avenue before turning left onto College Avenue (U.S. Route 71B) and makes a stop at Uptown Campus as it travels towards the northern edge of Fayetteville. The route passes Joyce Boulevard and turns onto Zion Road, the penultimate cross street before entering Springdale. Now facing east, the Red routes stops at Toys "R" Us/Chick-fil-A before turning onto Frontage Road. After stopping at the Department of Human Services office the bus retraces its steps along College Avenue to enter the Northwest Arkansas Mall. After stopping at the mall for three minutes, the bus continues along its route to the south to stop at the Mall Avenue Walmart.

The Red bus now turns onto Shiloh Drive to stop at Target before turning south on Gregg Avenue. The bus next turns onto Appleby Road to stop at the Appleby Apartments. The next stops are at intersections with Bob Yonkin Drive and Country Lane. Prior to turning onto College Avenue southbound the bus stops at Aldi and the Fiesta Square Shopping Center. Now running south the bus turns on to Sunbridge Drive heading west, making stops at Villa Boulevard and Keystone Crossing. Returning briefly on Gregg Avenue the bus runs south before turning onto Poplar Street to stop at the Chestnut Apartments. The bus continues west to meet Leverett Street, which it follows south. The twentieth stop is at the intersection of Leverett and Melmar near the North Creekside Apartments. Passing townhouses the bus continues south along Leverett Street, stopping at Lawson Street before meeting Maple Street and returning to Union Station.

== Former routes ==
=== Maple Hill Express (Discontinued Summer 2013) ===
The Maple Hill Express is a short route with minimal stops created in 2010. The route begins at Union Station and runs north along Garland Avenue to stop at the Garland Avenue Parking Garage before turning left onto Cleveland Street. After turning around, the bus serves Reid Hall, Maple Hill, and Hotz Hall before turning south onto Garland Avenue. Its final stop is at the Pat Walker Health Center (thus giving access to the Northwest Quad) before returning to the station.

=== Pomfret Express (Discontinued Summer 2013) ===
The Pomfret Express begins at Union Station and runs south to stop at Brough Commons before descending a steep hill. After passing the Phi Gamma Delta house the Pomfret Express stops at Pomfret Honors Quarters. The route then runs along Stadium Drive before turning onto Meadow Street and serving the HPER Complex. Further east, the route stops at the corner of Meadow Street and Razorback Road near the John McDonnell Field. The bus next turns north onto Razorback Road and passes Razorback Stadium, turns right onto Maple Street and returns to Union Station. Pomfret Hall is the farthest south of all residence halls at the bottom of the hill upon which the University of Arkansas was built. This route provides relief to residents who do not want to climb the steep hill of approximately 100 feet (30 m). As an express route the Pomfret Express runs continuously from 6:00 am to 7:00 pm.

=== Route 56 ===
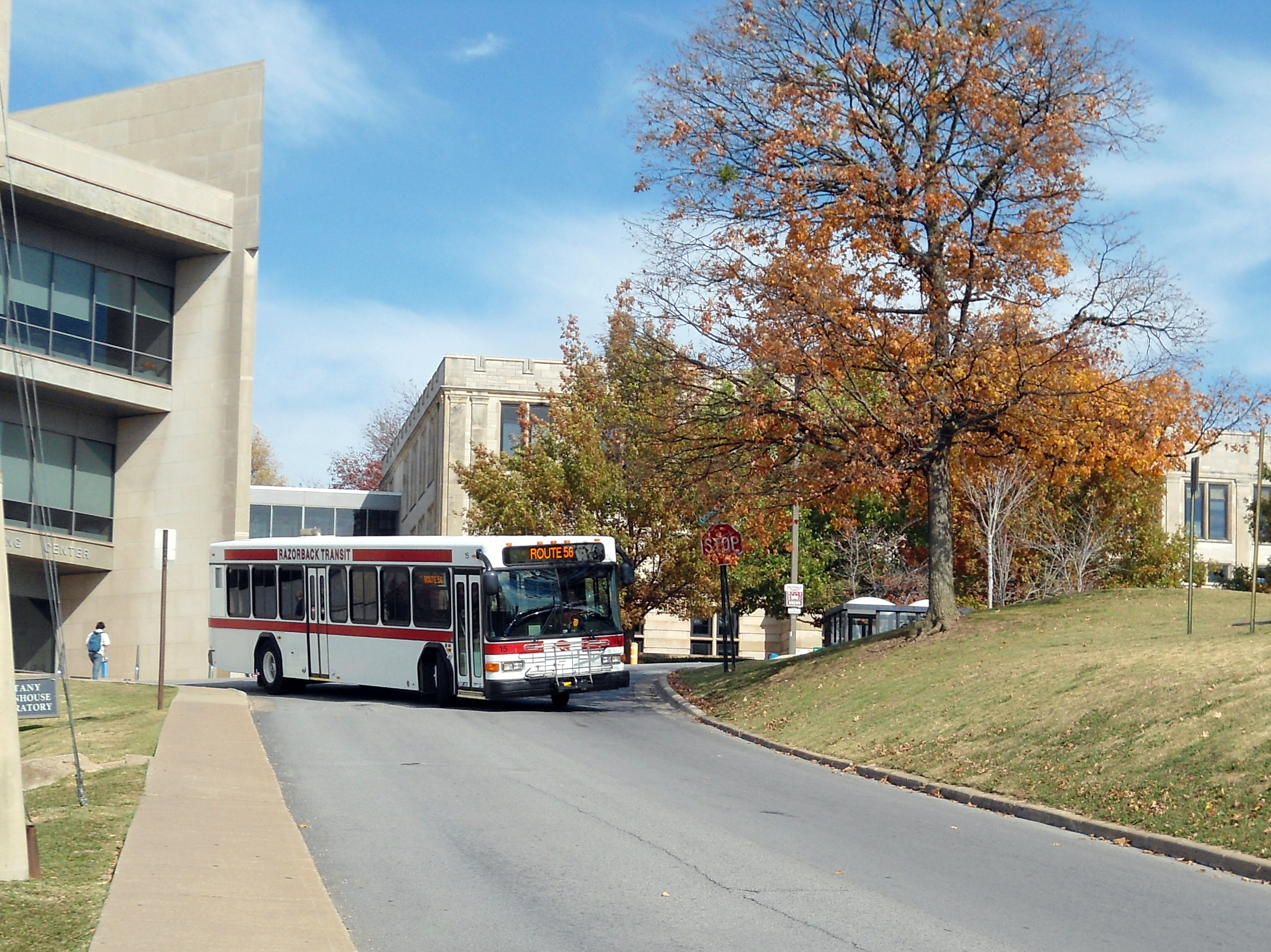
Route 56 turns down Duncan Avenue near Bell Engineering Center

Route 56 is the only standard service route that does not stop at Union Station. It instead begins at student parking lot 56, which is one of the lots in which University of Arkansas students can park daily with the cheapest available parking pass. The bus departs lot 56 and turns north along Razorback Road. It turns east onto Meadow Street to stop near the HPER prior to stopping at Pomfret Hall. The route now turns east onto Clinton Boulevard past the historic Clinton House and north onto Harmon Avenue. Route 56 stops at the Harmon Avenue Garage, and near Science Engineering Auditorium before it turns onto Dickson Street. A stop at the intersection of Dickson Street and Duncan Avenue near Bell Engineering Center is followed by stops at the Duncan Avenue Apartments, Glendale Apartments, and the Stone Street intersection. Continuing south on Hill Avenue the route stops at the intersection of Hill Avenue and MLK Boulevard. The route follows MLK Boulevard west to re-enter lot 56. The bus stops on the east side of lot 56 before continuing and stopping near the Lady'Backs soccer stadium. Route 56 then ends where it began, in the west part of lot 56 near the entrance to the Razorback Gardens.

=== Tan route ===
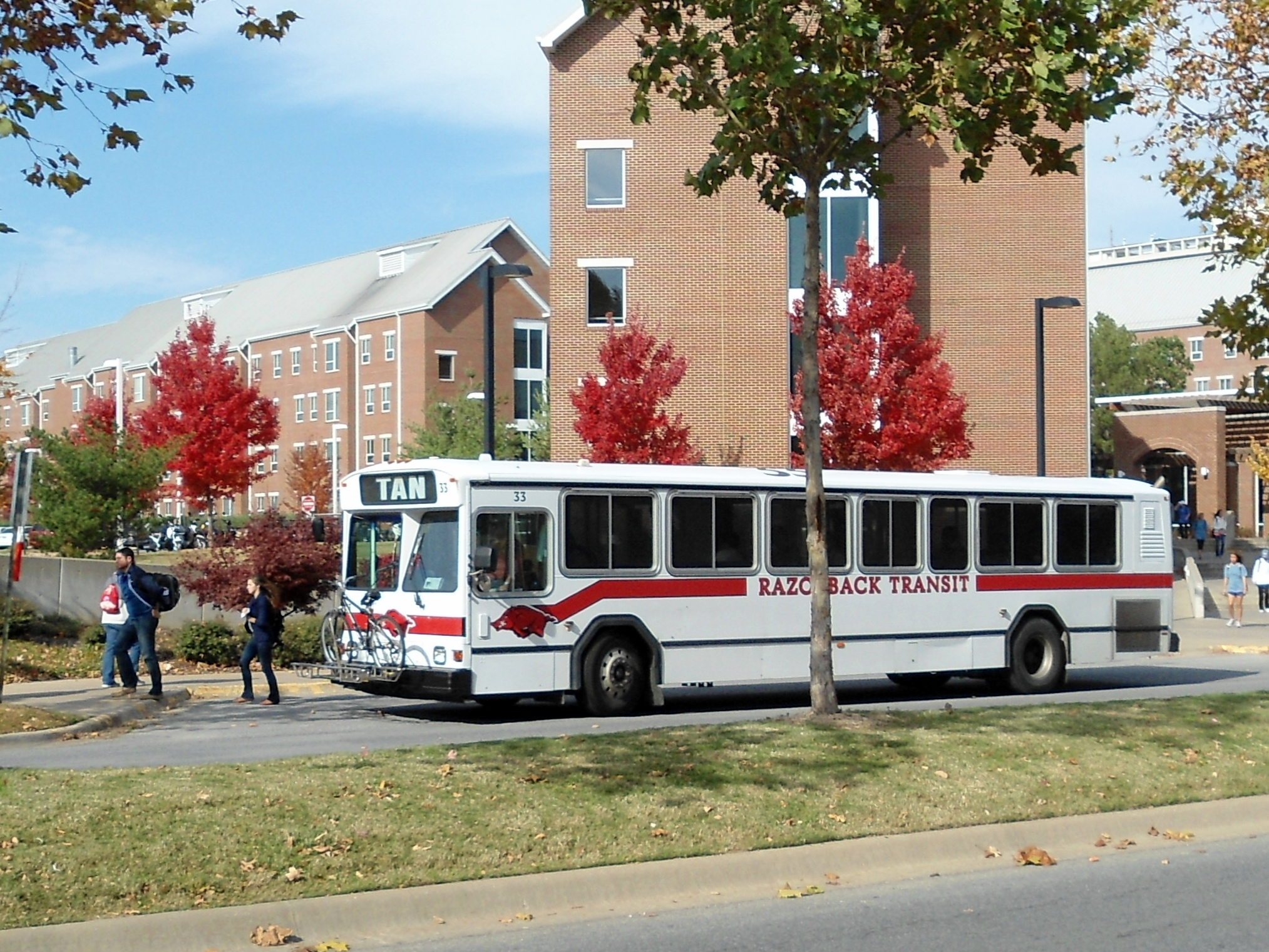
A Tan route bus stops at the Northwest Quads/Pat Walker Health Center

The route begins at Union Station and departs north on Garland Avenue. It runs past the Garland Avenue Garage and turns left onto Wedington Drive (AR 112S). The bus stops at the intersection with Sang Avenue and Porter Road intersection before crossing I-540/US 71 and continuing into west Fayetteville. The next stop is at the Maple Manor Apartments, followed by Chamberland Square. The route stops at the intersection of Persimmon Street and Betty Jo Drive before turning onto Betty Jo Drive, followed by a stop at Jewell Road. Next, the Tan bus stops at Betty Jo Corner before returning to Wedington Drive heading east. The bus crosses I-540/US 71 and turns left onto Porter Road, after which it stops at the Cornerstone Apartments and the Lifestyle Apartments. Now turning right onto Deane Street the bus stops at the Shamblin Apartments and makes a stop at the Lewis Soccer Complex. A third stop for the Tan route on Deane Street is at the Washington Plaza Apartments/The Pines Apartments. It then turns onto Lewis Street and then Mt. Comfort Road, where it stops at Stephens Street and, further east, the Garden Park Apartments. The final stop is at Harps on Garland Avenue before the Tan bus returns to Union Station.

=== Yellow route ===
The Yellow route begins at Union Station and runs south to stop ar Brough Commons. The bus next descends the steep hill and stops at Pomfret Hall. It follows Stadium Drive before turning left onto Meadow Street and making stops at the HPER and at the Razorback Road intersection. The Yellow route follows Razorback Road north, stopping at Lot 44/Razorback Stadium and before entering the Reid Hall parking lot. The yellow bus makes stops at Reid Hall and Hotz Hall before turning right onto Garland Avenue heading south. It makes its final stop at the Pat Walker Health Center before returning to Union Station.

== Special routes ==
Two special routes, Gold and Silver, are run on Razorbacks football home gamedays. Both routes serve to connect fans who park in the scholarship lots to Razorback Stadium. These buses are allowed to run along the main streets of campus prior to the game which are blocked to ordinary traffic.

== Fixed route ridership ==
The ridership statistics shown here are of fixed route services only and do not include demand response services.

== See also ==
- List of bus transit systems in the United States
- Ozark Regional Transit
