= University of Arkansas College of Education & Health Professions =

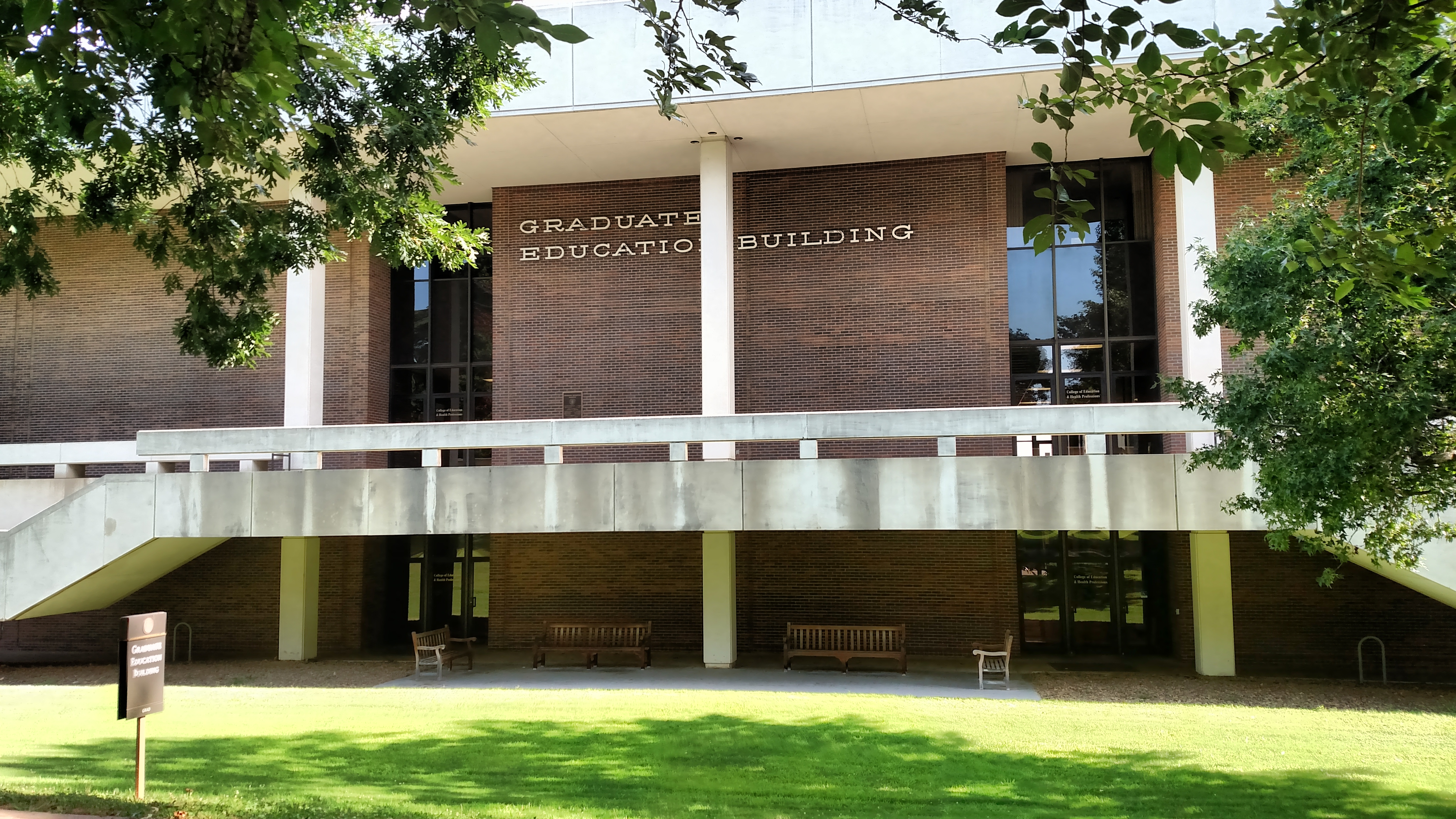
- Graduate Education Building, home to the college's offices
- Type: Public
- Affiliations: University of Arkansas
- Dean: Kate Mamiseishvili
- Students: 4,992 (Spring 2015)
- Undergraduates: 3,822 (2015)
- Postgraduates: 1,170 (2015)
- Location: Fayetteville, Arkansas, United States; 36.0696°N 94.1700°W
- Campus: Campus
- Website: coehp.uark.edu

The College of Education & Health Professions is the University of Arkansas's college for students with interest in the education and health professions. The college has five departments, and an honors program through the Honors College. In 2015, Fulbright College awarded the second-most undergraduate degrees of the eight colleges at the University of Arkansas.

== Departments ==
- Curriculum and Instruction
- Education Reform
- Eleanor Mann School of Nursing
- Health, Human Performance and Recreation
- Rehabilitation, Human Resources and Communication Disorders
- The College of Education and Health Professions' Honors Program

== Mann School of Nursing ==
Two degrees are offered by the School of Nursing, the Bachelor of Science in Nursing, and a cohort-based Master of Science in Nursing Online Clinical Program, which will take a full-time student 2½ years to complete.

== Facilities ==
A gallery shows the facilities of the college, with years used in parentheses.

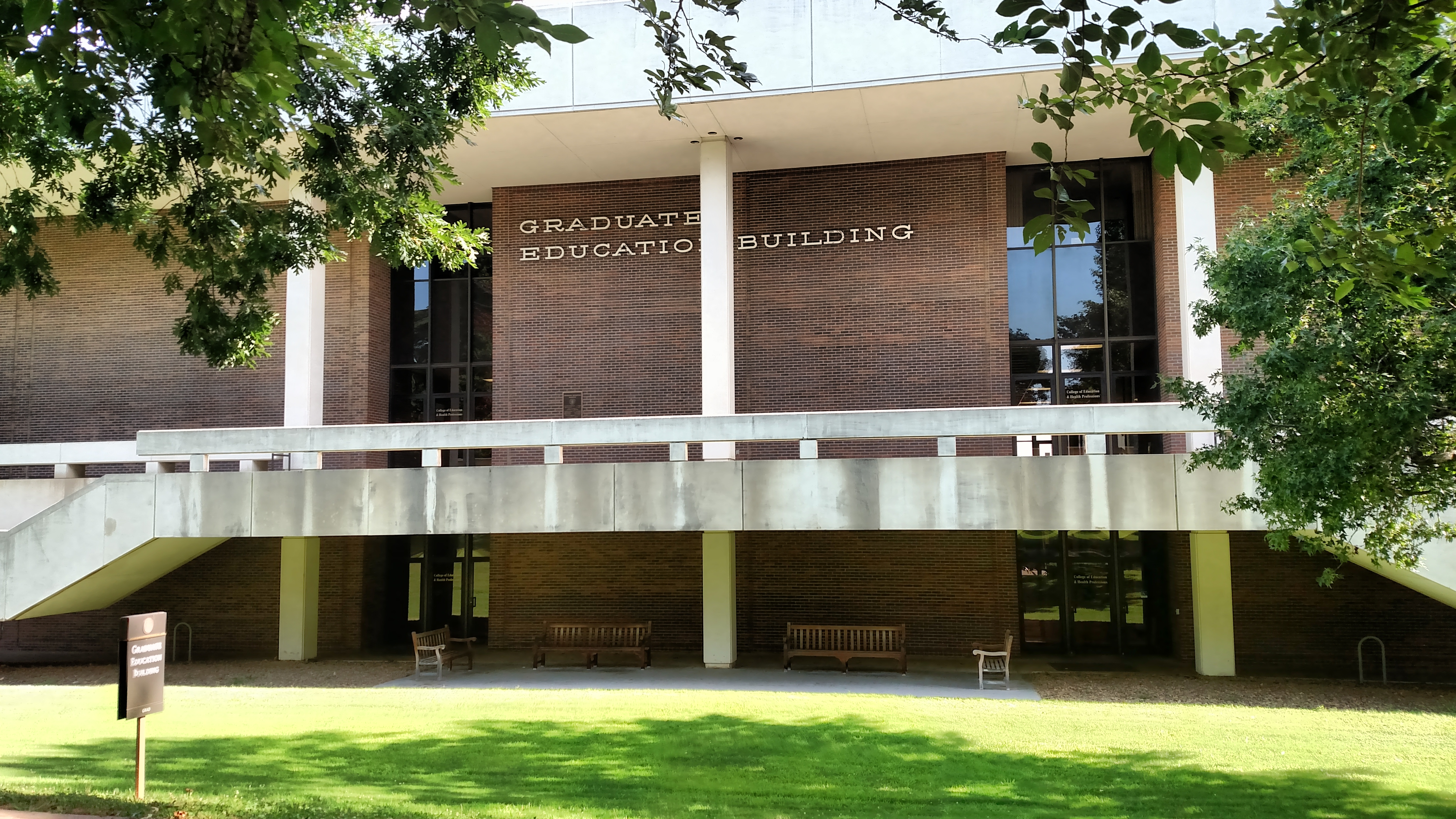
Graduate Education Building, home to the Dean and Administrative Offices

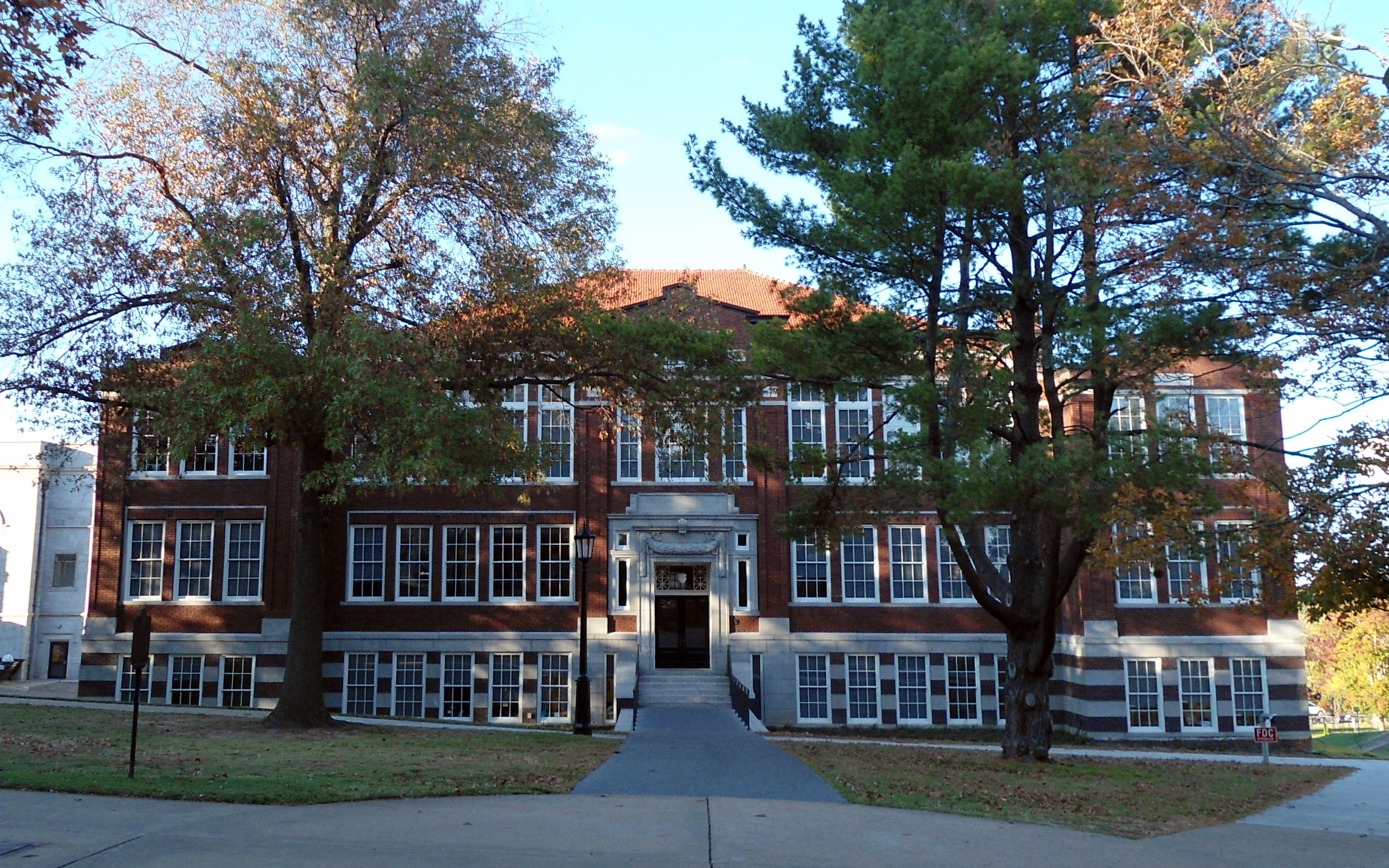
Peabody Hall (1913-Present)
