= Peabody Hall =

Peabody Hall may refer to:

- Peabody Hall (University of Arkansas), in the University of Arkansas Campus Historic District
- Peabody Hall (Gainesville, Florida), at the University of Florida
- Peabody Hall (University of Mississippi), listed as a one of Mississippi's Landmarks
- Peabody Hall (Miami University, Ohio)
