= Ozark Regional Transit =

Provider of bus transportation in Northwest Arkansas

- Parent: Arkansas Department of Transportation (ArDOT)
- Founded: 1982
- Headquarters: 2423 East Robinson Ave
- Locale: Springdale, Arkansas
- Service area: Washington County, Arkansas; Benton County, Arkansas
- Service type: Bus service
- Routes: 13
- Stations: 1
- Daily ridership: 1,157 (2014)
- Annual ridership: 202,060 (2022)
- Fuel type: Diesel
- Website: ozark.org

Ozark Regional Transit is the provider of mass transportation in the Northwest Arkansas region, including Fayetteville, Springdale, Rogers, and Bentonville.

== History ==
The roots of the organization are in a 1974 project by the Economic Opportunity Agency of Washington County to provide rural transportation. By 1978, two fixed routes had been established and, in 1982, after being designated as an urban area, northwestern Arkansas formed Ozark Regional Transit and acquired federal funding. Currently, 5 local routes serve the interconnected Fayetteville and Springdale communities and two routes travel through the Rogers-Bentonville area. A commuter route travels once per day in each direction to provide a peak connection between Fayetteville and rural Washington County, while another commuter route travels all day between the four major cities.

=== Fire ===
In January 2017, an explosion and subsequent fire destroyed 20 ORT buses, leaving only six functional buses in the fleet. In the subsequent weeks, transit services from around the country donated buses to ORT to restore their fleet, including Dallas Area Rapid Transit, Key West Transit, Port Authority of Allegheny County, Razorback Transit, and Rural Transit Enterprises Coordinated, with many other lending buses until the fleet could be restored.

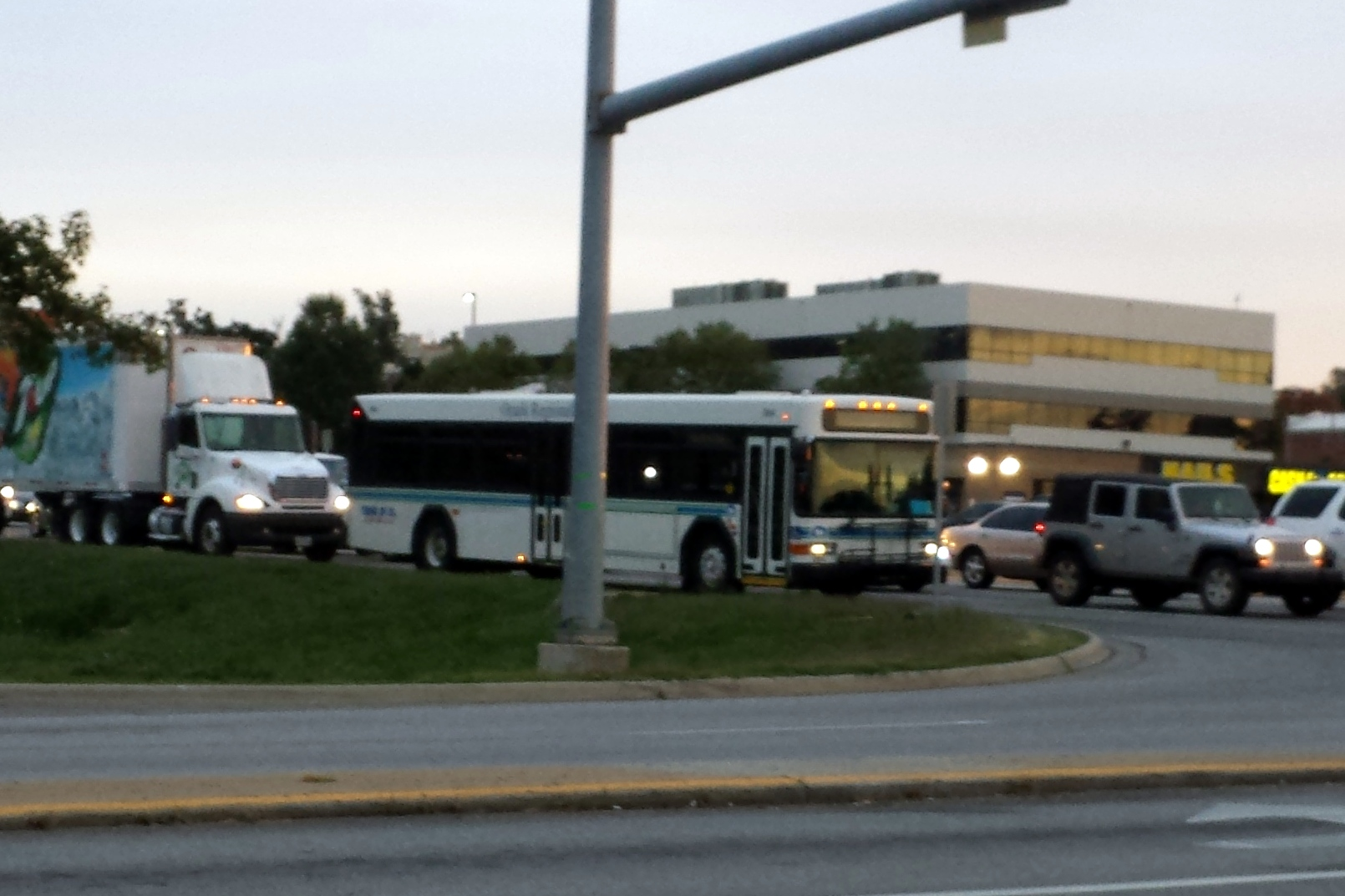
ORT Bus formerly of Duluth Transit Authority

== Routes ==
- Route 1 - Fayetteville
- Route 2 - Fayetteville
- Route 3 - Fayetteville/Johnson
- Route 4 - Fayetteville
- Route 11 - Bentonville
- Route 51 - Rogers
- Route 52 - Rogers
- Route 61 - Springdale
- Route 62 - Springdale
- Route 63 - Springdale/Johnson
- Route 64 - Springdale
- Route 490 - I-49 Express
- Commuter Express - Arkansas Archaeological Survey to Walmart Home Office, Bentonville, Arkansas

== Fixed route ridership ==
The ridership statistics shown here are of fixed route services only and do not include demand response services.

== See also ==
- List of bus transit systems in the United States
- Razorback Transit
