= David W. Mullins Library =

Research library at the University of Arkansas

Coordinates: 36.06873°N 94.17385°W

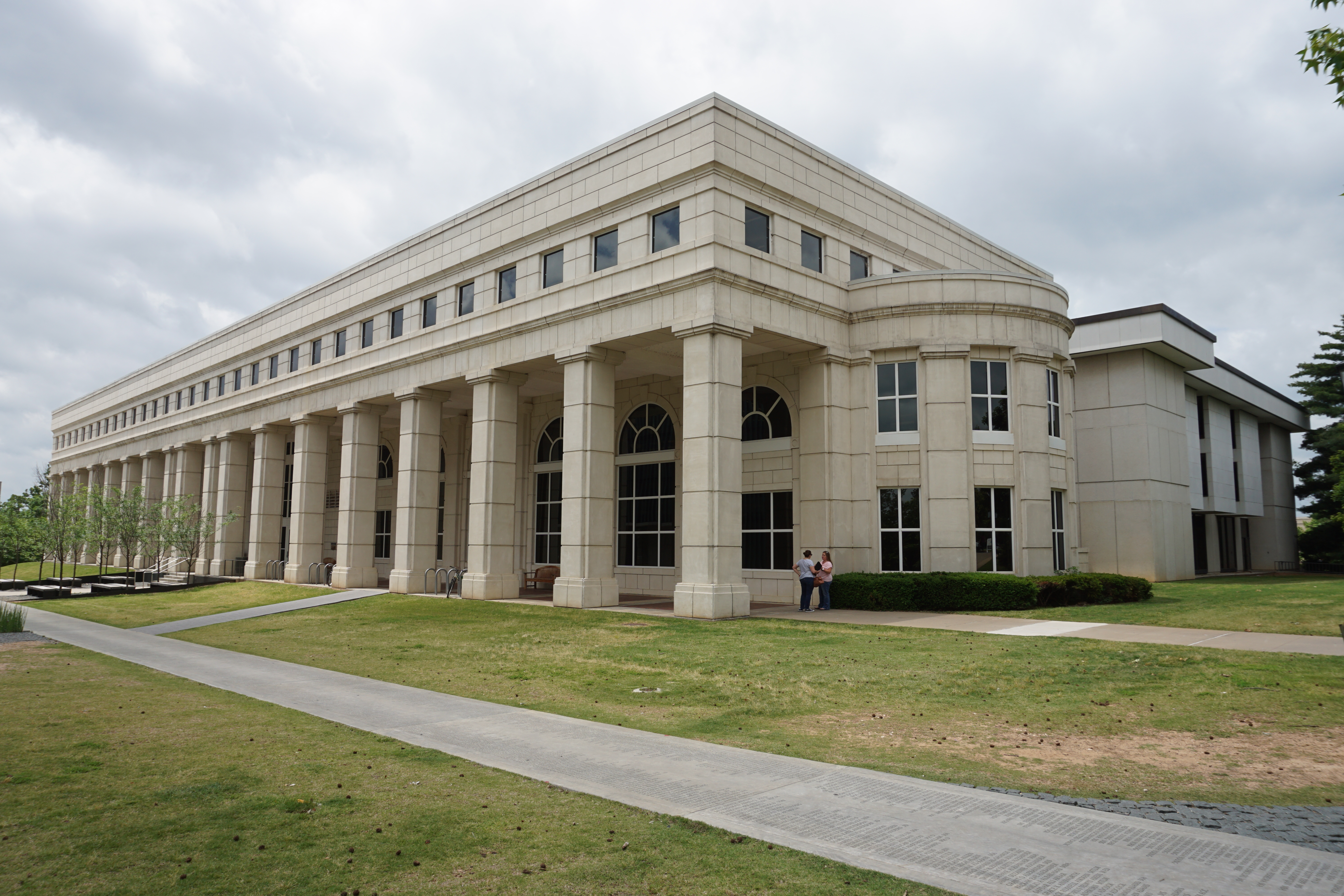
Mullins Library East Facade

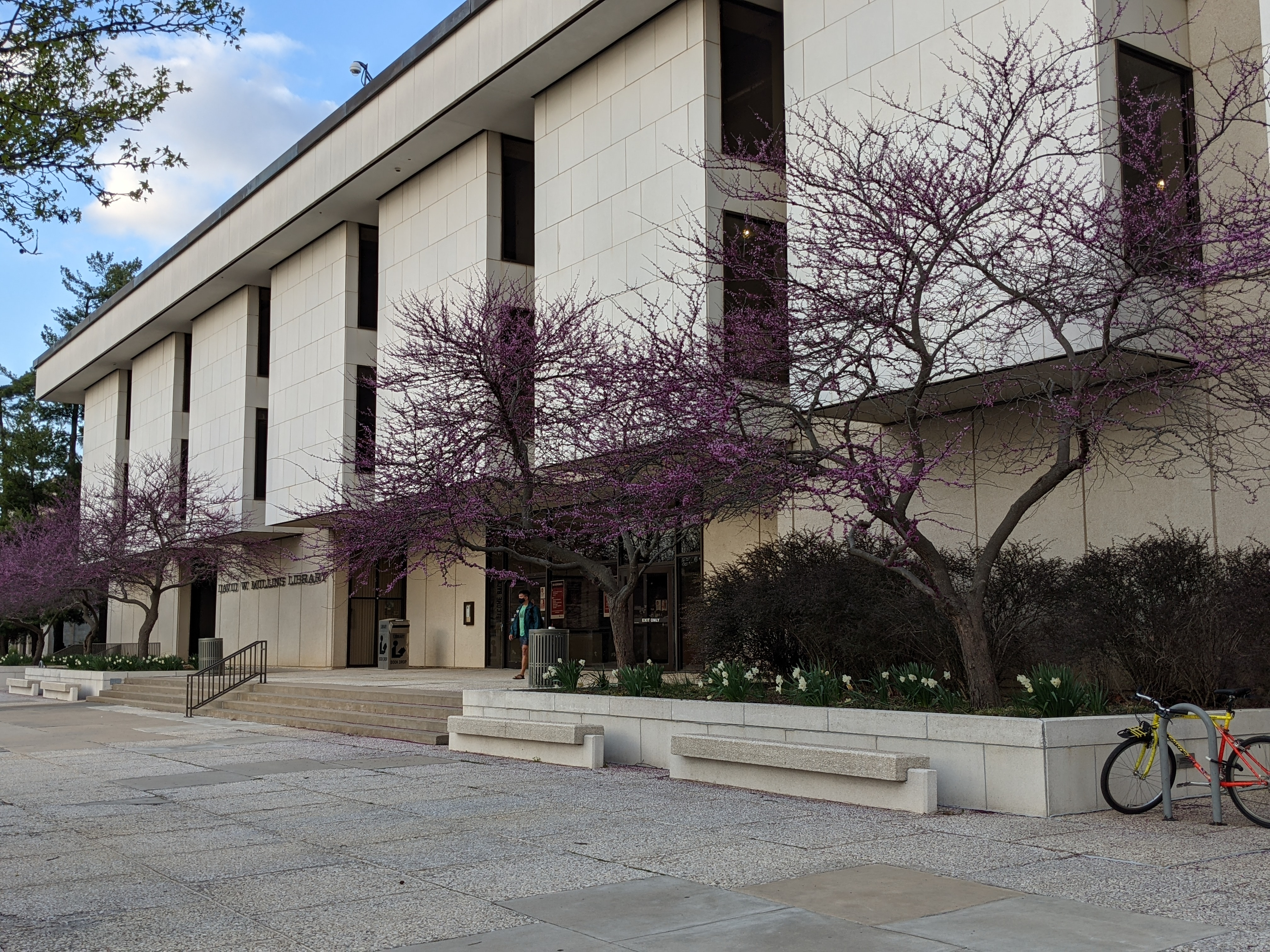
Mullins Library west side

The David W. Mullins Library is the main research library of the University of Arkansas. The University Libraries also include the Robert A. and Vivian Young Law Library, the Fine Arts Library, the Chemistry and Biochemistry Library, and the Physics Library.

Named for University President David Wiley Mullins, Mullins Library was built in 1968 to replace Vol Walker Hall as the main University Library. Mullins Library was renovated and expanded in 1997 and again in 2025.

The University Libraries' combined holdings total more than 2.4 million volumes of books and periodicals, 5.5 million microforms, and 92,600 journal titles. Other resources include 144,000 maps, 21,000 linear feet of manuscripts, 43,000 audio and video recordings, and thousands of music scores. The Libraries' Special Collections acquires and preserves access to historical manuscripts, University Archives, Arkansas Collection, rare books, historical maps, and the Arkansas Architectural Archives. Select items from these collections are digitized for the online Digital Collections.

== See also ==
- Campus of the University of Arkansas
