= University of Arkansas College of Engineering =

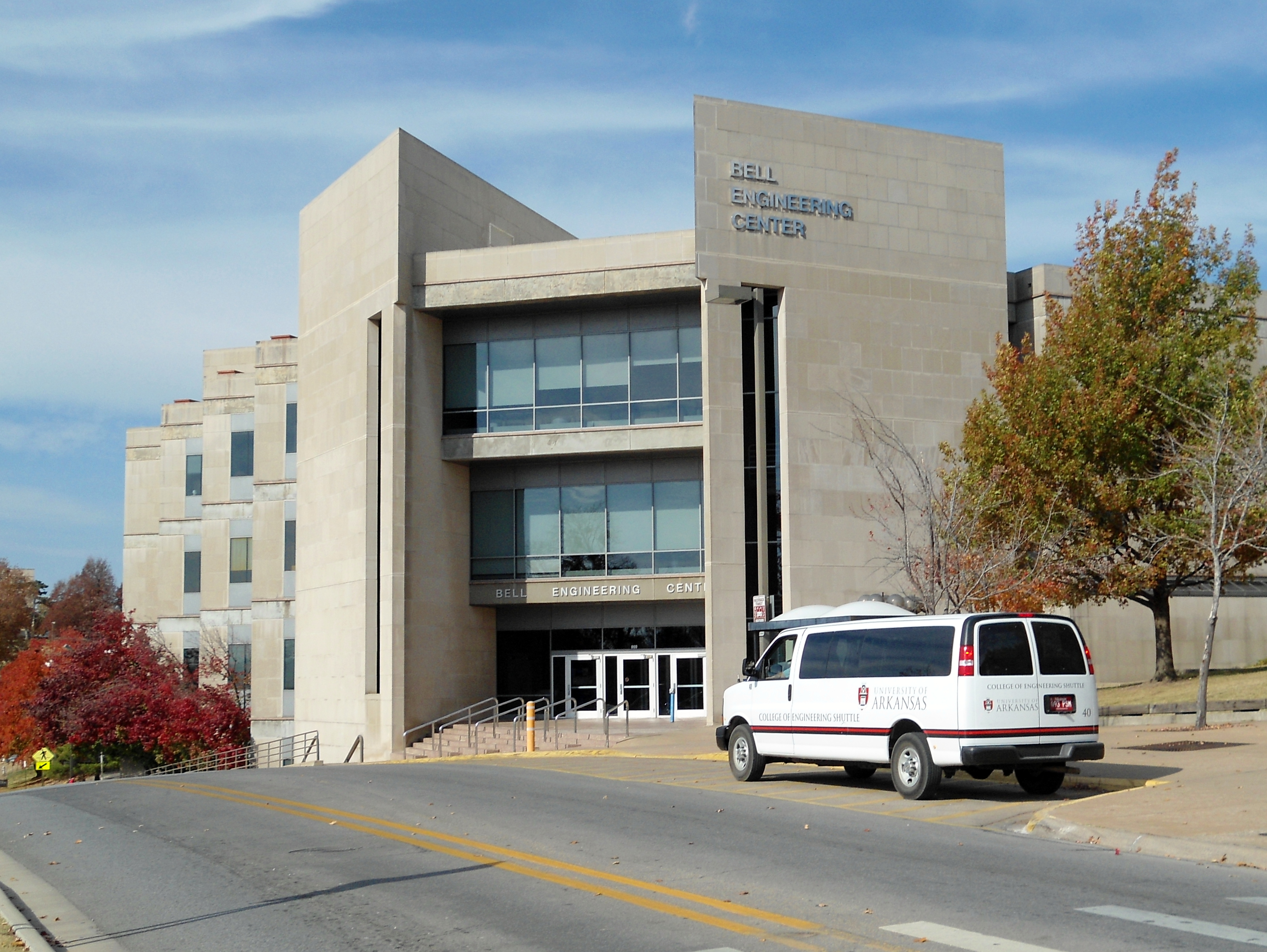
- Type: Public
- Established: 1913
- Dean: Kim Needy
- Faculty: 103
- Students: 4,285 (Fall 2016)
- Undergraduates: 3,335 (Fall 2016)
- Postgraduates: 950 (Fall 2016)
- Location: 800 West Dickson, Fayetteville, Arkansas, U.S. 36°04′01″N 94°10′17″W
- Campus: University of Arkansas
- Website: www.engr.uark.edu

The College of Engineering is the University of Arkansas' college for engineering students.

== History ==
The first engineering degree awarded by the university was in civil engineering in 1888. At the time, it was known as Arkansas Industrial University, and did not have a separate engineering college. The College of Engineering was established in 1913.

In 2006, a solar boat built by University of Arkansas mechanical engineering students and electrical engineering students won the Collegiate World Championships.

In 2023, it was announced that the Department of Electrical Engineering and the Department of Computer Science and Computer Engineering were to merge into one department, the Department of Electrical Engineering and Computer Science.

== Description ==
There are eight different undergraduate degree programs, with 31 graduate degree programs, currently offered.

== Departments ==
- Department of Biological and Agricultural Engineering
- Department of Biomedical Engineering
- Department of Civil Engineering
- Department of Data Science
- Department of Electrical Engineering and Computer Science
- Department of Industrial Engineering
- Department of Mechanical Engineering
- Ralph E. Martin Department of Chemical Engineering

== Honors ==
Academic rankings

National
- Forbes: 283
- U.S. News & World Report: 135 (tie)
- Washington Monthly: 208
- WSJ/College Pulse: 444

Global
- QS: 801 (tie)
- THE: 501 (tie)
- U.S. News & World Report: 650 (tie)

The Industrial Engineering graduate program ranked 26th in the nation, and the Engineering program as a whole finished 98th, and is one of the "best values" for Arkansas students nationally.

== Facilities ==
Prior to the establishment of a separate engineering college, education was conducted in Old Main. Engineering Hall, now known as the John A. White Jr. Engineering Hall became the primary engineering facility upon completion in 1927. In 1964, Mechanical Engineering and Electrical Engineering moved to the new Mechanical Engineering Building and Science Engineering Hall, respectively. Mechanical Engineering remains the only department separated from the others, located one block west at 845 West Dickson. The Department of Electrical Engineering moved with the remaining departments to Bell Engineering Center at 800 West Dickson upon its completion in 1987. Science Engineering Hall, at 850 West Dickson, continues to be used for classroom space by the various engineering departments.

A closed factory in south Fayetteville was purchased in 1983, now known as the Engineering Research Center at 600 West Research Center Boulevard. The Nanoscale Material Science and Engineering Building (known as the Nano Building), housing the microelectronics-photonics (MicroEP) program opened September 2011 at 731 West Dickson. The program is coordinated between several engineering departments, science departments, physics department, poultry science department, and the University of Arkansas Graduate School.

A gallery, with dates used by the College of Engineering in parentheses, shows the facilities used throughout the years.

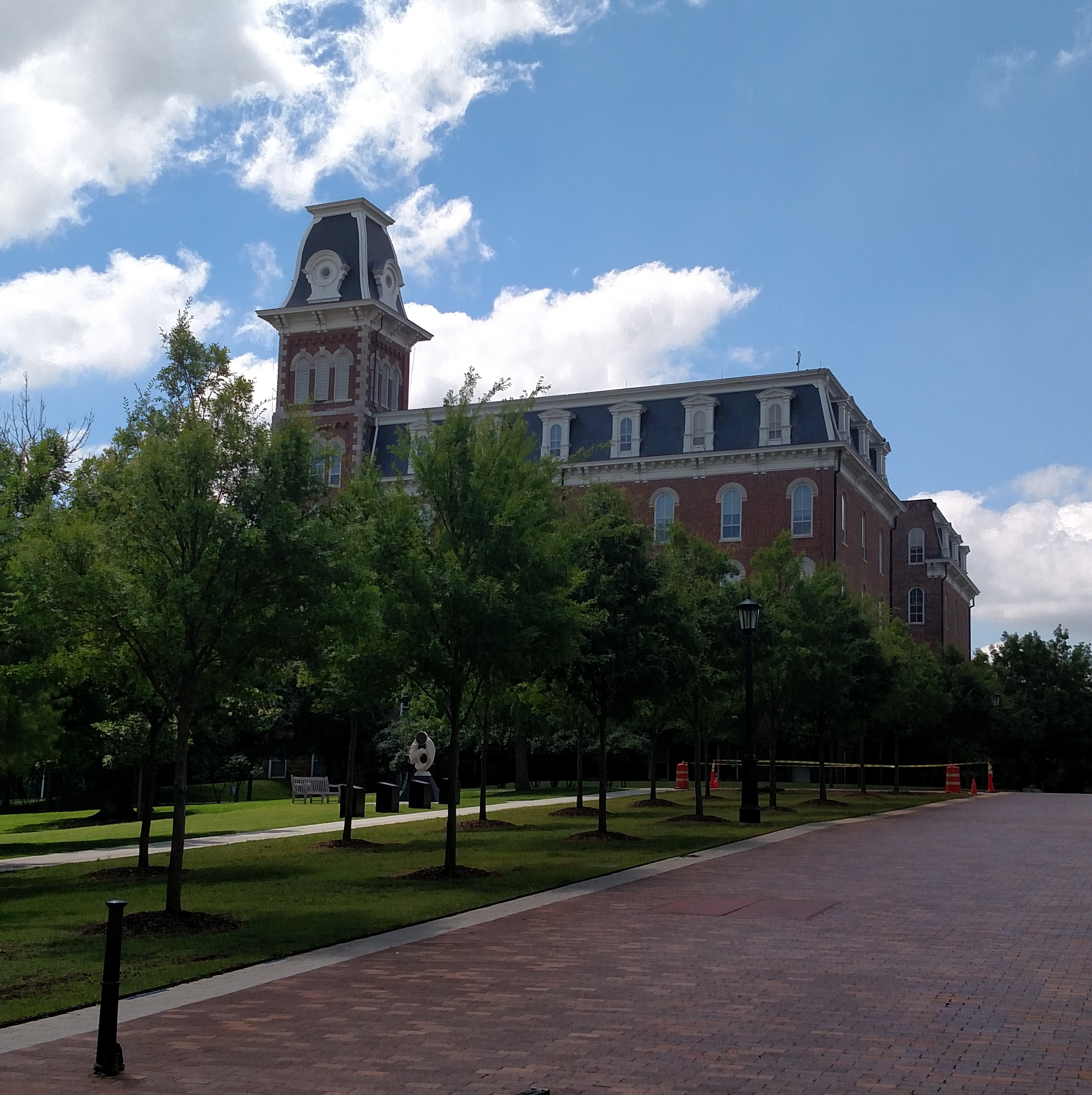
Old Main (1873-1927)

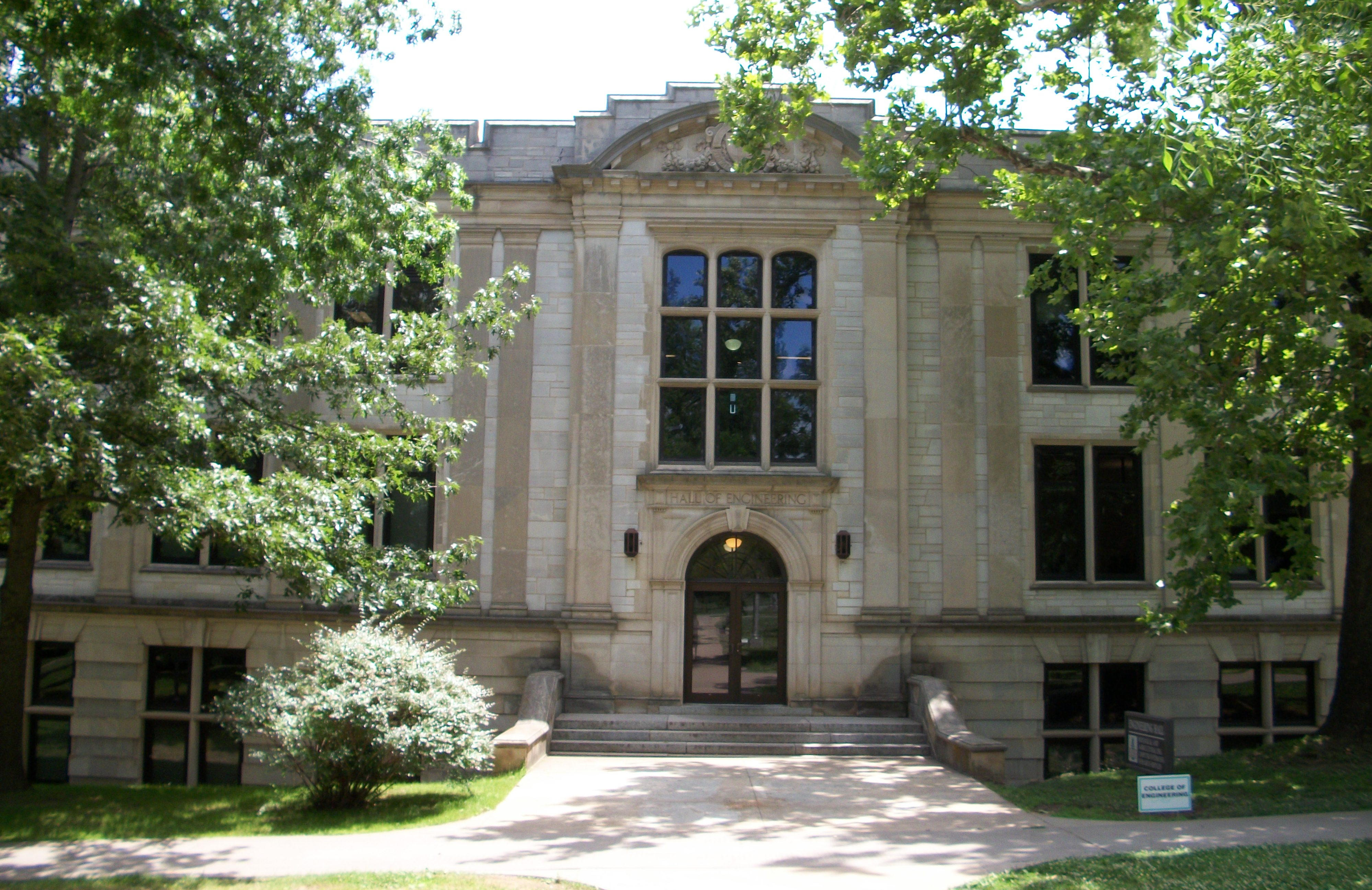
John A. White Jr. Engineering Hall (1927–Present)

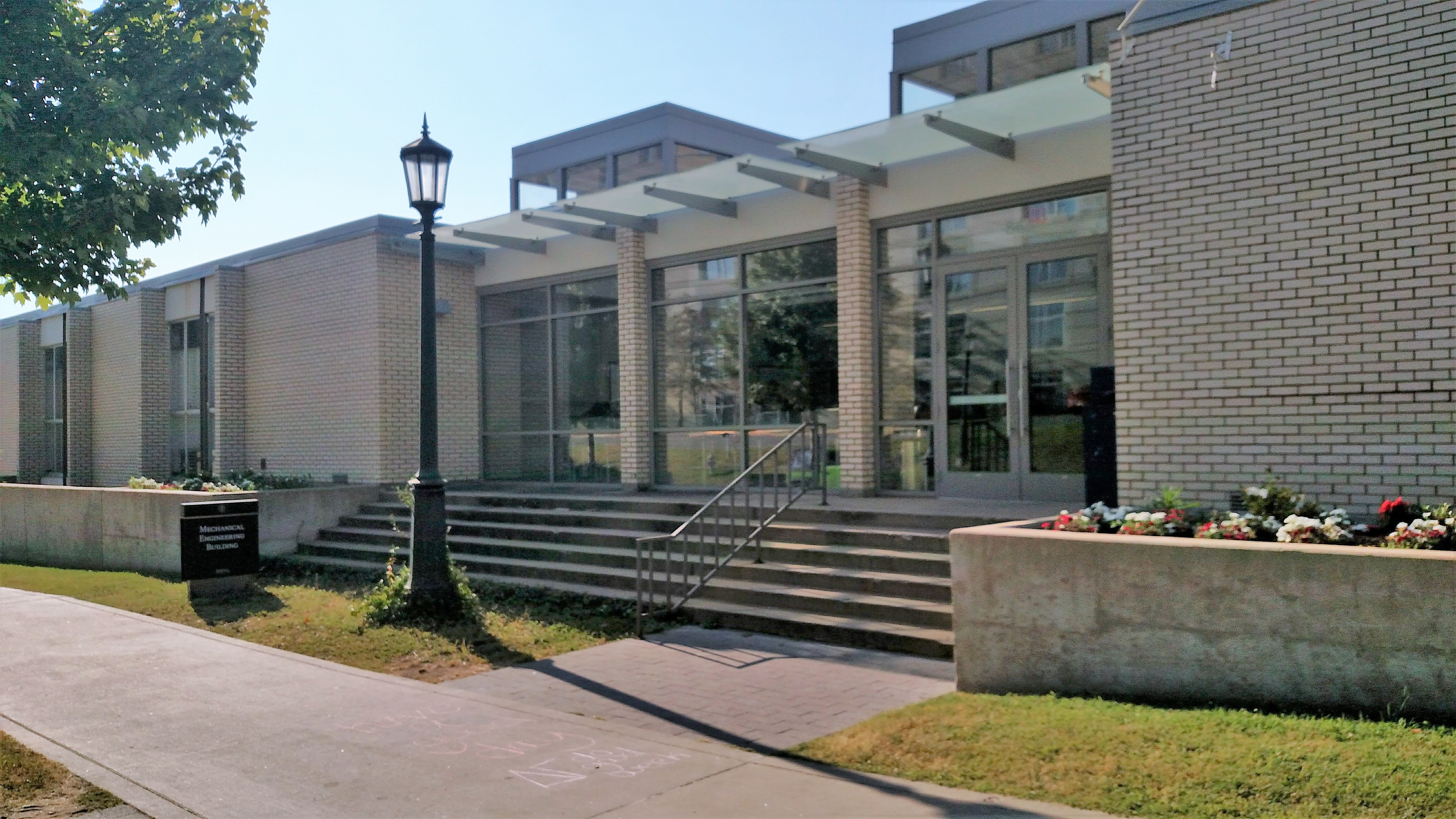
Mechanical Engineering Building (1964–Present)

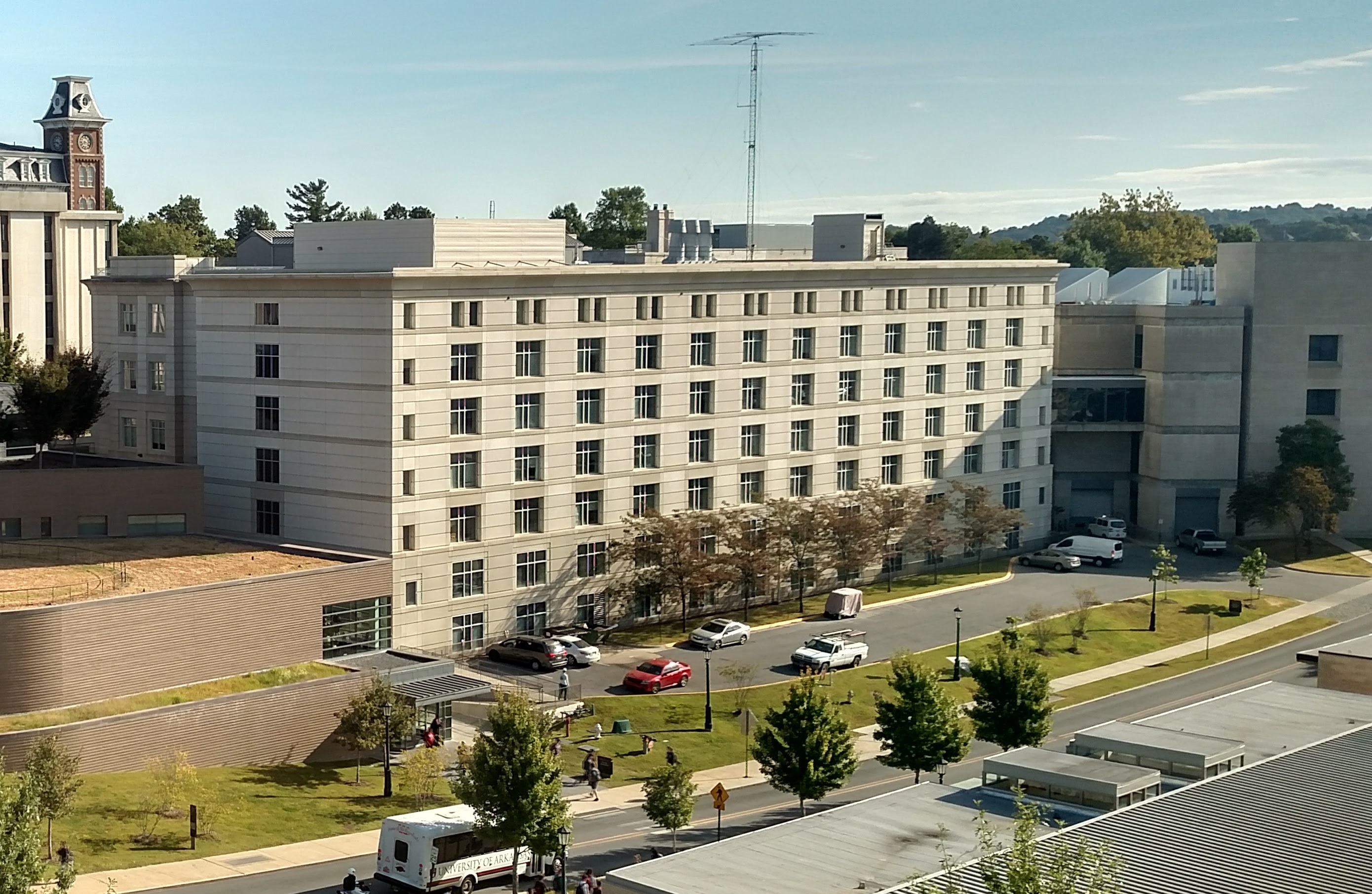
Science Engineering Hall (Electrical Engineering, 1964–1987)

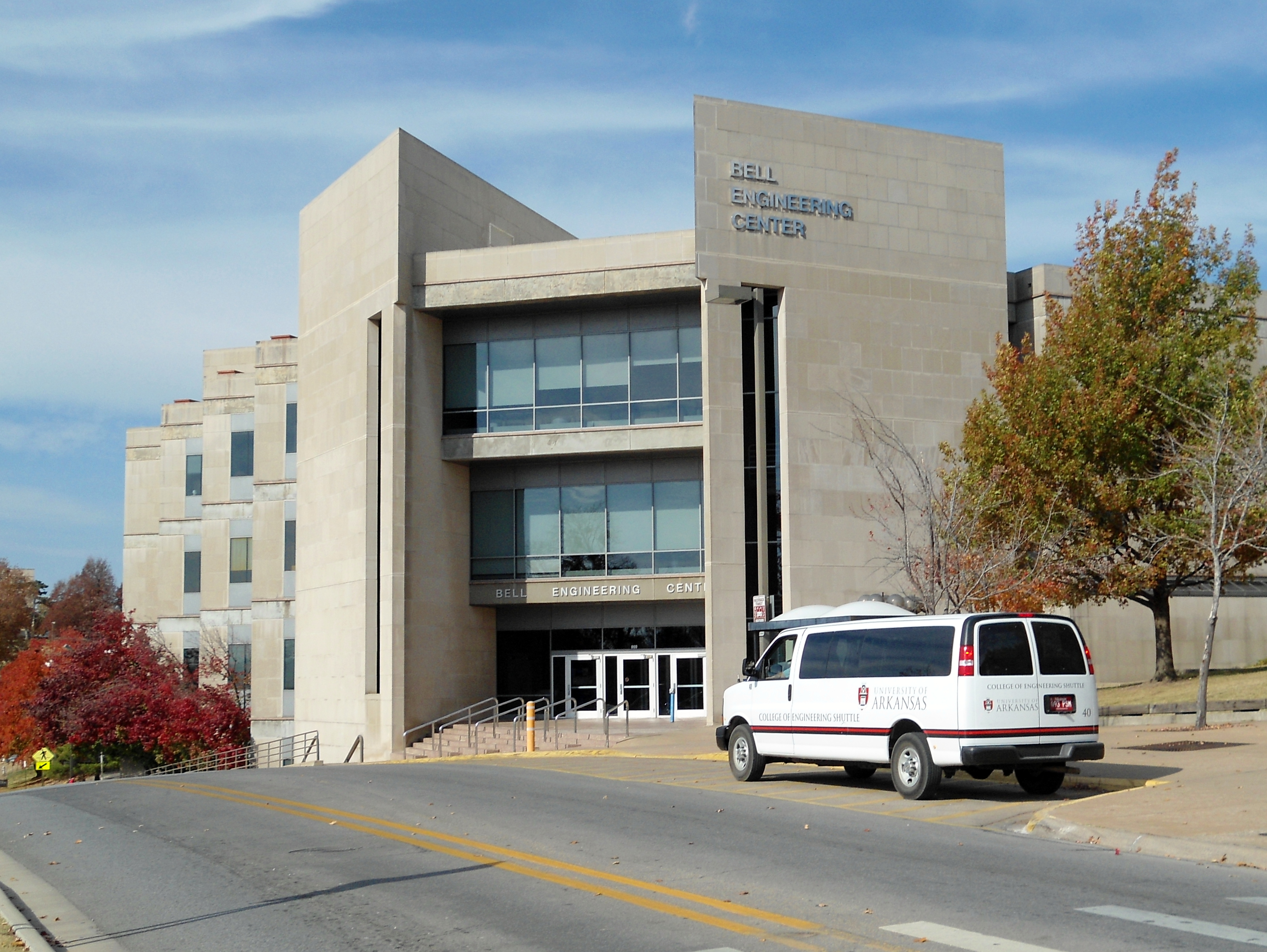
Bell Engineering Center (1987–Present)

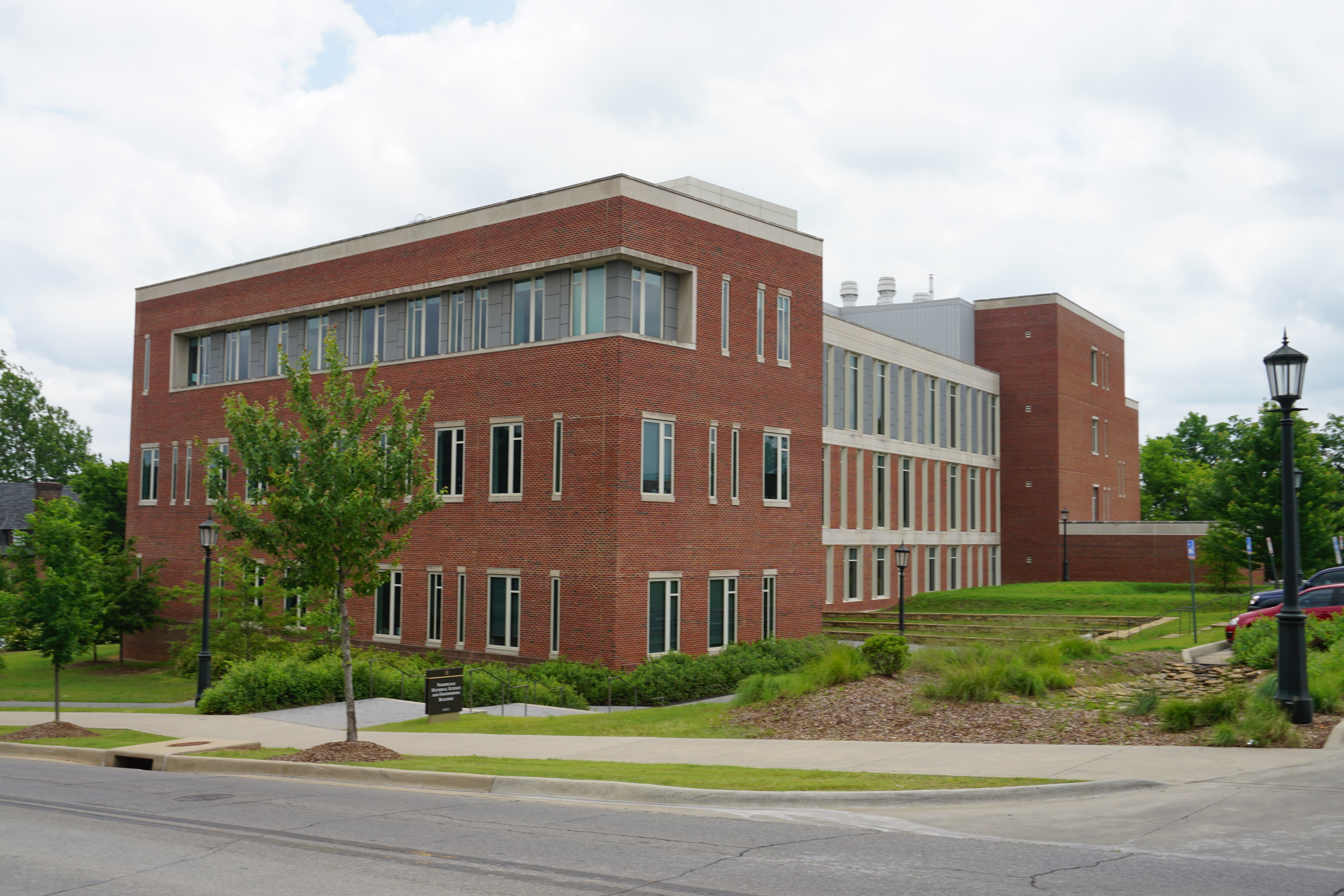
Nanoscale Material Science and Engineering Building, (2011–Present)

== Notable alumni ==
- Morris S. Arnold, lawyer, historian, and judge on the United States Court of Appeals for the Eighth Circuit
- John Burkhalter, business owner and politician
- Jana Della Rosa, politician representing the Rogers area in the Arkansas House of Representatives
- Andy Davis, represented a district of Little Rock in the Arkansas House of Representatives from 2013 to 2020
- Jim Hendren, politician representing western Benton County in the Arkansas Senate
- Kim Hendren, politician representing western Benton County in the Arkansas House of Representatives
- Johnny Key, business owner and politician, represented Bull Shoals Lake area in the Arkansas House of Representatives and Arkansas Senate, 2003–2015, Arkansas Secretary of Education from 2015–2023
- Jack Ladyman
- Lynn Lowe
- Mark Martin, Secretary of State of Arkansas and former member of the Arkansas House of Representatives, representing western Washington County
- Reginald Murdock, politician in the Arkansas General Assembly since 2011
- Bruce Westerman, politician representing Arkansas's 4th congressional district in the U.S. House of Representatives
- John A. White, former University of Arkansas chancellor and dean of Georgia Institute of Technology College of Engineering
