= Arkansas Union =

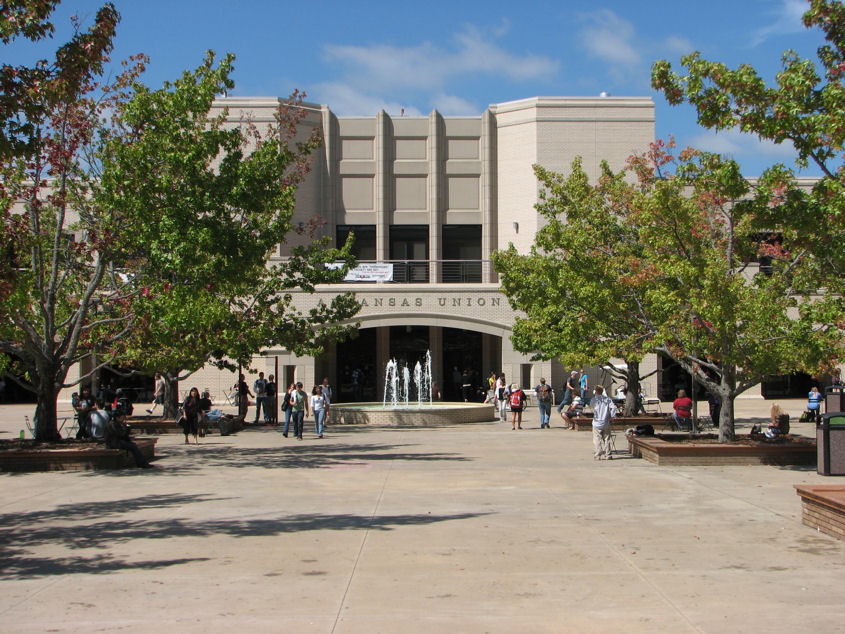
- The University of Arkansas Union

- Location within Arkansas Location within the United States
- Alternative names: The Union or Student Union

General information
- Type: Student union
- Location: Campus of the University of Arkansas, 435 N. Garland Avenue, Fayetteville, Arkansas, USA
- Coordinates: 36°4′6″N 94°10′30″W
- Completed: 1973
- Owner: University of Arkansas

Website
- union.uark.edu

The Arkansas Union at the University of Arkansas is a Student union central building on the university's campus in Fayetteville, Arkansas. Originally constructed in the early 1970s and opened in 1973, the facility was expanded in 2000 to meet the growing needs of the campus community.

== Uses ==
Arkansas Union was opened in 1973 to replace the old Student Union. It houses offices and information centers for numerous on- and off-campus organizations, in addition to a student-accessible computer lab and places to eat. The Union is frequented as a meeting place for students, and hosts thousands of meetings, events, and activities annually.
