= Peabody Hall (University of Arkansas) =

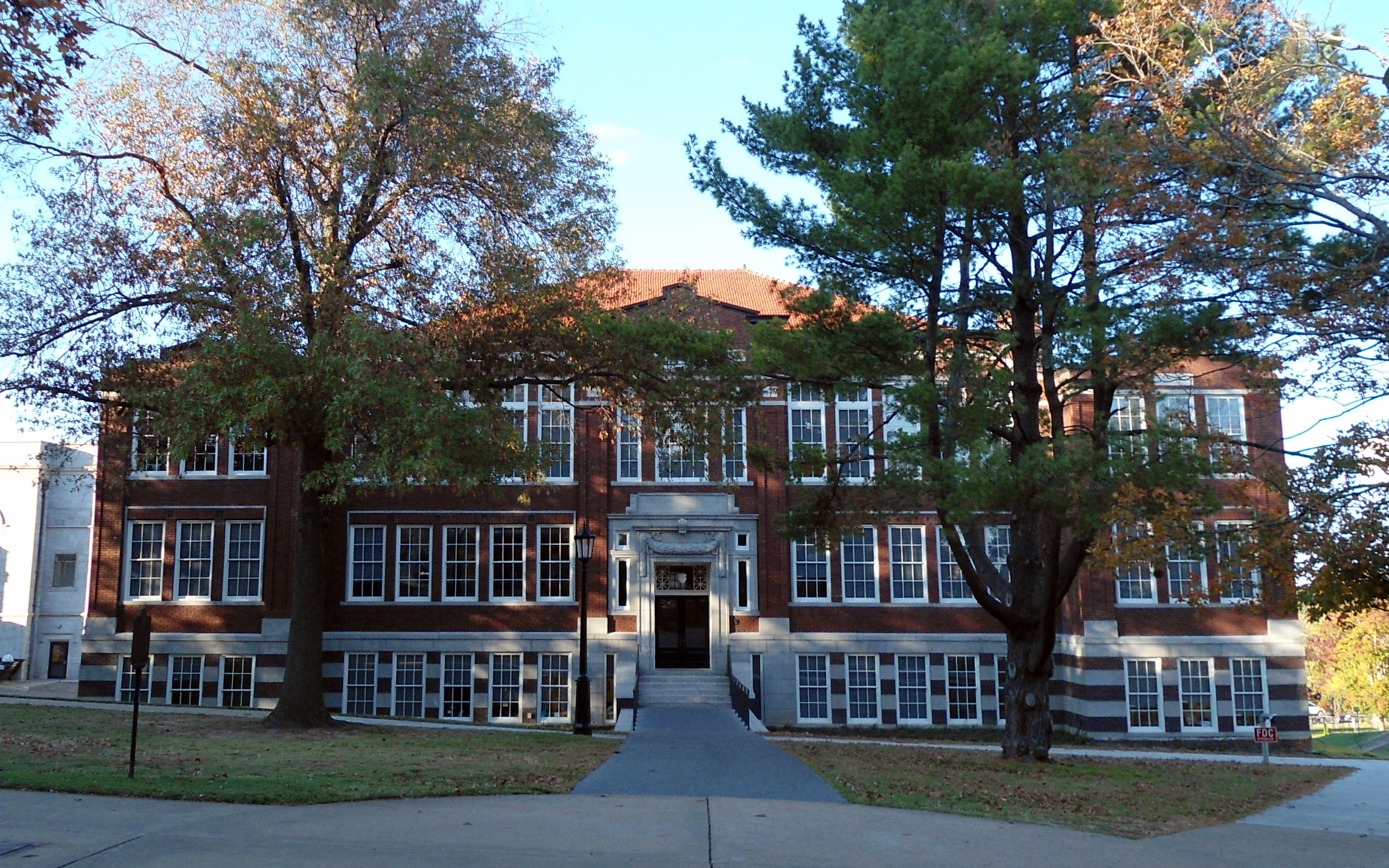
- Interactive map of the Peabody Hall area

General information
- Type: Education
- Architectural style: Classic Revival with Mission influence
- Location: Campus of the University of Arkansas, Peabody Hall; University of Arkansas; Fayetteville, AR 72701
- Coordinates: 36.069691°N 94.170709°W
- Completed: 1913
- Renovated: 1943, 2011
- Cost: $40,000 ($691,600 in 2012 dollars)
- Owner: University of Arkansas

Design and construction
- Architect: L.J. Roberts

Peabody Hall is a building on the University of Arkansas campus in Fayetteville, Arkansas. The 1913 structure is a contributing property to the University of Arkansas Campus Historic District, which is listed on the National Register of Historic Places. Peabody Hall has continuously housed the teacher education department since completion in 1913. Today, the department is part of the University of Arkansas College of Education and Health Professions. It was built using private funds from George Peabody, one of the fathers of modern philanthropy.

== See also ==
- University of Arkansas Campus Historic District
