= David Wiley Mullins =

American academic

16th President of University of Arkansas
- In office 1960–1974
- Preceded by: Storm Whaley (acting)
- Succeeded by: Charles E. Bishop

Personal details
- Born: August 11, 1906 Ash Flat, Arkansas, U.S.
- Died: September 22, 1987 (aged 81)
- Spouse: Eula Elizabeth Harrell(deceased)
- Children: 3, including David W. Mullins, Jr.
- Education: University of Arkansas; University of Colorado; Columbia University
- Profession: Educator
- Nickname: Hunkasauras Rex

David Wiley Mullins (born August 11, 1906 in Ash Flat, Arkansas, died September 22, 1987) was an American academic. He was the president of University of Arkansas in Fayetteville, Arkansas from 1960 to 1974, the second longest serving president.

== Early life and education ==
Mullins was born August 11, 1906, in Ash Flat, Arkansas, to Roscoe C. and Emma Matilda Mullins. He attended University of Arkansas, graduating cum laude in 1931. In 1934, he earned a master's degree from the University of Colorado. He received his doctoral degree from Columbia University in 1941.

== Career ==
Began his teaching career during the Great Depression as a high school teacher in the small rural town of Lepanto, Arkansas, where he also as the superintendent of schools. He later became the chair of the department of educational administration for Alabama Polytechnic Institute, which would later become Auburn University. However, he served as a lieutenant in the U.S. Navy during World War II.

After the war, Mullins returned to Alabama Polytechnic Institute as a vice president, serving from 1949 to 1960. However, his alma mater would soon need a new president. In 1959, John Tyler Caldwell left the Arkansas to become chancellor of North Carolina State University. The university search committee named Storm Whaley as acting president. In 1960, Mullins was named the president.

During his presidency, the campus had tremendous growth. The student enrollment more than doubled, which lead to a massive construction phase. The university built new a student union, library, and communications building along with new residence halls. Among the new residence halls were Yocum, Humphreys, Fulbright, Hotz and Carlson Terrace. Much of the building was funded by private gifts to the university. However, similar to most college campuses during the 1960s, Mullins also presided over the tumultuous period that included the Vietnam War protests.

Additionally, Mullins helped create the University of Arkansas System, brokering a series of mergers. First came Little Rock University in 1969, which became University of Arkansas at Little Rock, along with Arkansas A&M in 1971, which would be renamed University of Arkansas at Monticello, and Arkansas Agricultural, Mechanical & Normal (AM&N), eventually renamed the University of Arkansas at Pine Bluff in 1972.

== Personal life ==
In August 1935, he married Eula Elizabeth Harrell. They had three children, Carolyn, David Jr., and Gary. His son, David W. Mullins, Jr., would go on to become the Vice Chairman of the Federal Reserve from 1991 to 1994.

In 1965, he was awarded an honorary Doctor of Laws degree from Hendrix College. In 1969, the Arkansas Democrat named Mullins Man of the Year in Arkansas. In 1983, the University of Arkansas awarded him an honorary Doctor of Laws degree.

He died on September 22, 1987, at age 81.

The main research library at the University of Arkansas was named the David W. Mullins Library in his honor.
