= Campus of the University of Arkansas =

College campus in Fayetteville, Arkansas, US

Coordinates: 36°04′05″N 94°10′19″W

There are many buildings on the campus of the University of Arkansas. Most of the historic structures are part of the University of Arkansas Campus Historic District on the National Register of Historic Places. This article focuses on the non-listed buildings.

== Buildings ==
=== Graduate Education Building ===
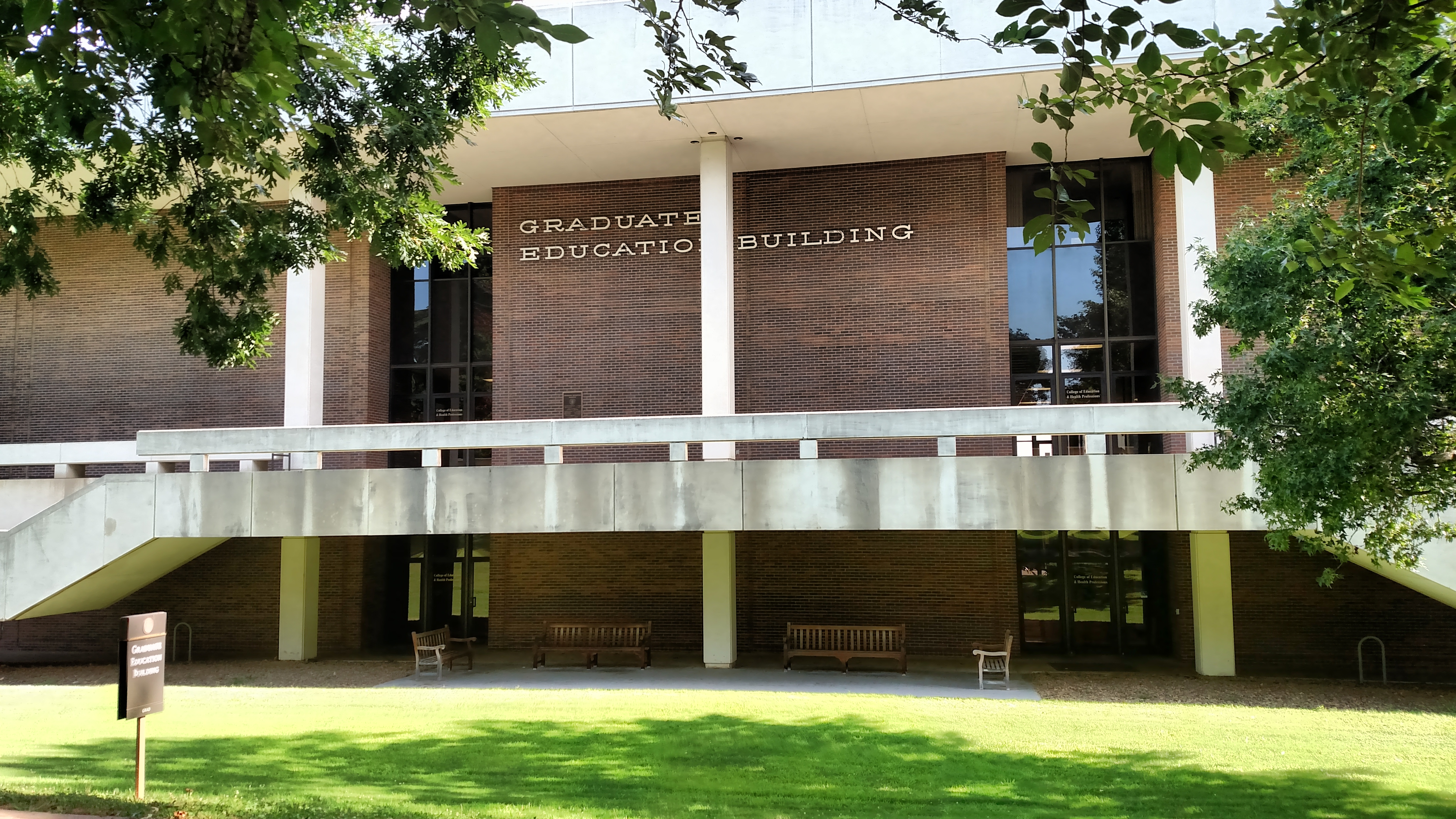
Graduate Education Building

=== J. B. Hunt Center for Academic Excellence ===
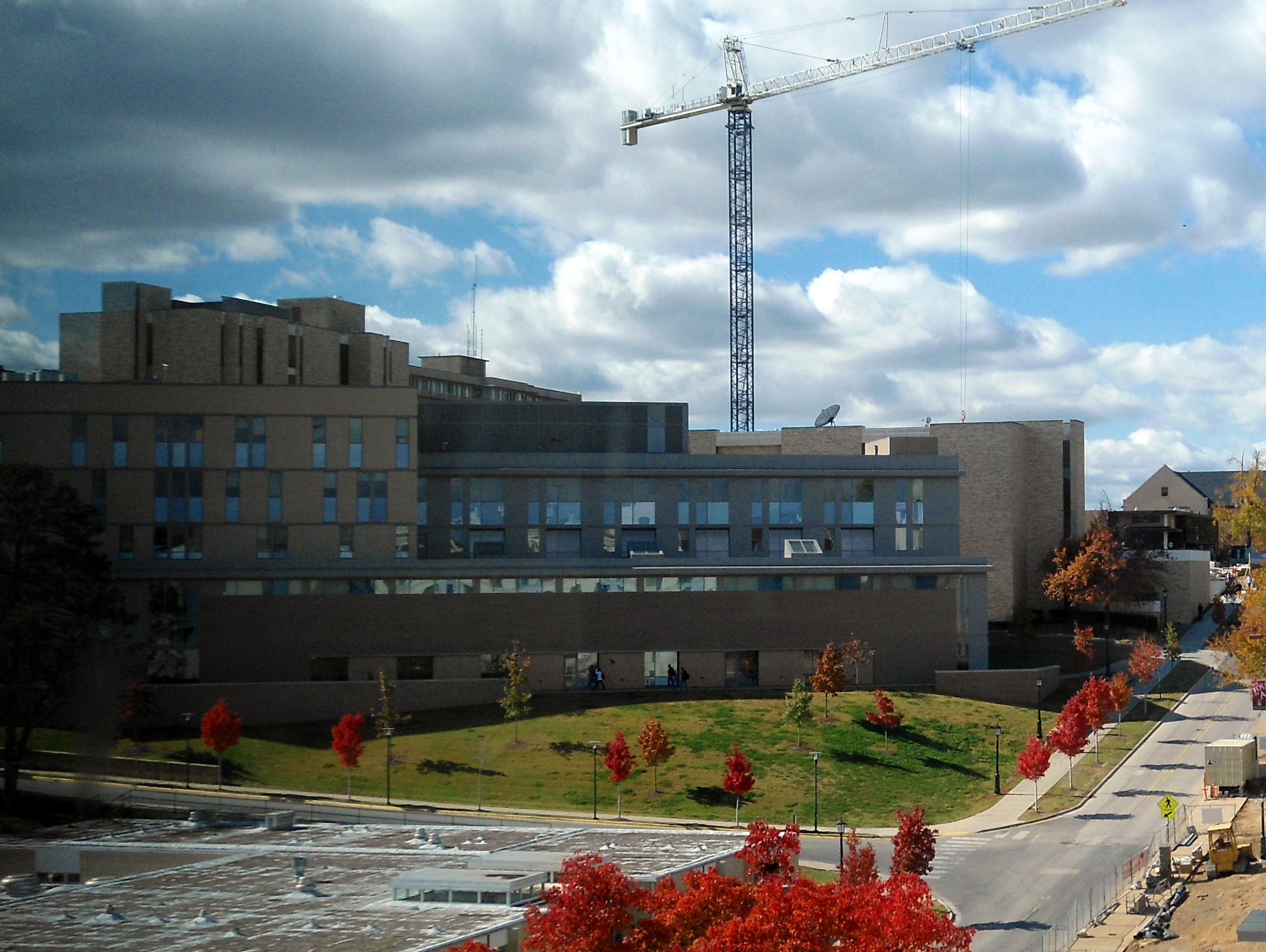
JB Hunt Center for Academic Excellence, November 2012

=== Mullins Library ===
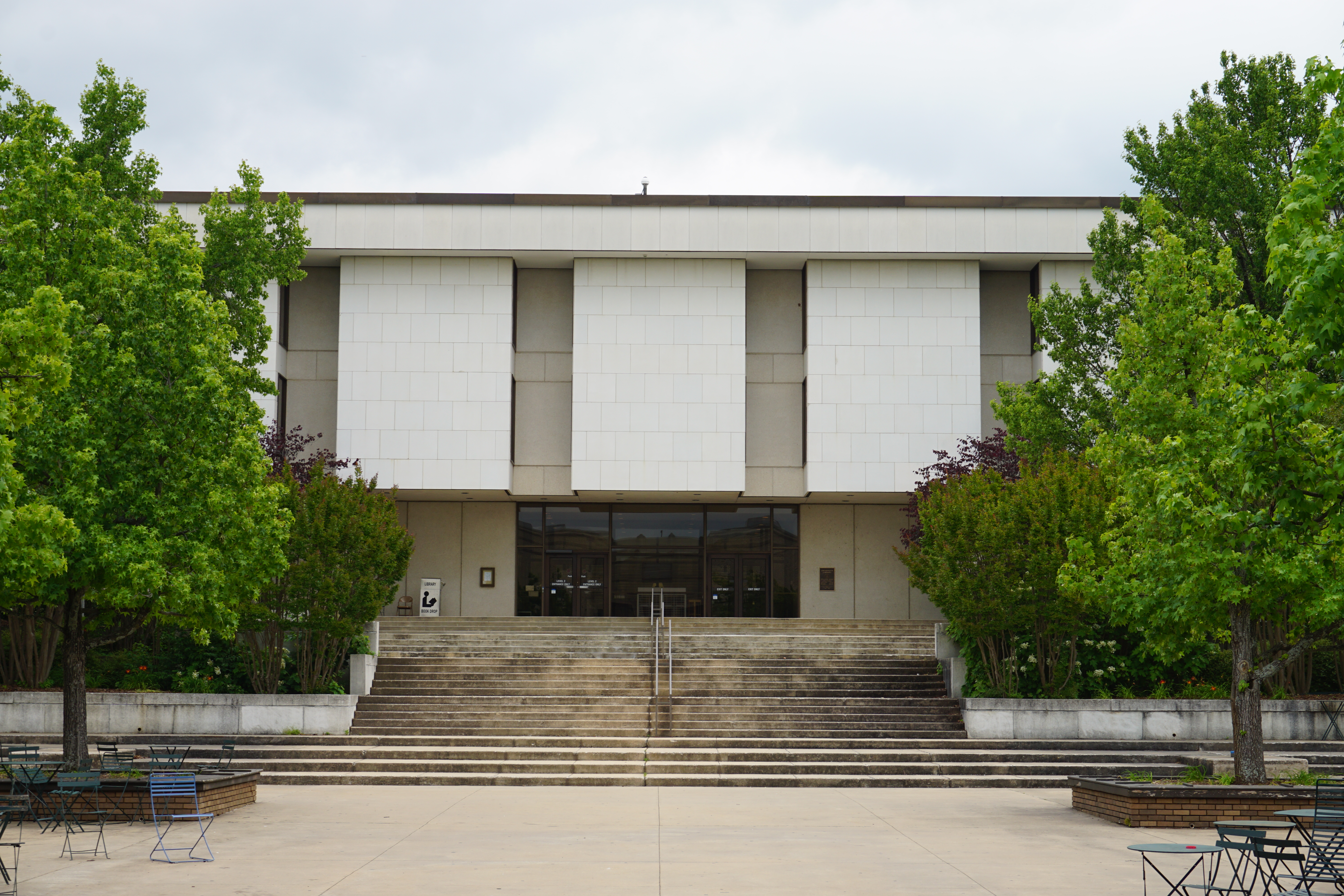
David W. Mullins Library

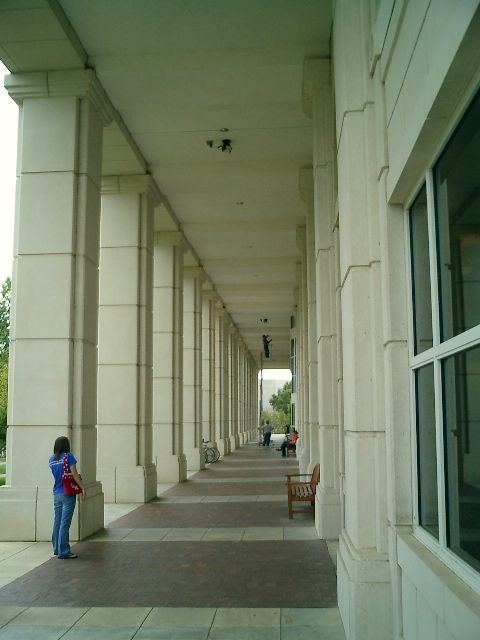
East Entrance to Mullins

David W. Mullins Library is located in the center of campus. It is the second largest library in the state of Arkansas next to the Clinton Presidential Library. It contains 4 floors of information in almost every kind of modern medium. This includes several special archives related to Arkansas history. It is named after David Wiley Mullins, who was the president of the university from 1960 to 1974 (its second longest serving president), and helped create the University of Arkansas System, brokering a series of mergers.

=== Arkansas Union ===
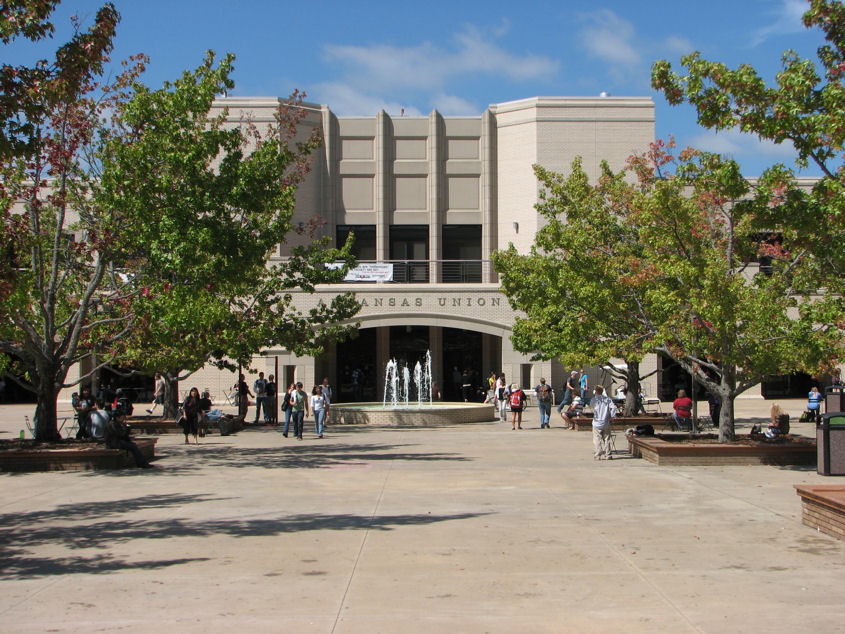
Arkansas Union

The Arkansas Union (sometimes referred to simply as the union) is at the center of campus and student life. It contains a large computer lab with over 70 computers, a coffee shop (Hill Coffee Co.), the campus multicultural center, movie theater, auditorium, ballroom, food court, bus station, post office, offices for student government and student organizations, a satellite campus recreation center, and several other small stores and offices. The entire building has wireless internet access and a student technology center that loans laptops out to students, free of charge.

=== George and Boyce Billingsly Music Building ===
This building serves as the home for the music department and contains faculty studios, music classrooms, rehearsal and practice spaces, and administrative offices. It was constructed in 1976 as an addition to the Fine Arts Building which was designed by Edward Durell Stone in 1950. The existing music building was renamed in 2000 by the University of Arkansas Board of Trustees in honor for George and Boyce Billingsley, of Bella Vista Arkansas, for the establishment of the Billingsley Music Fund to support programs within the department.

=== Daniel E. Ferritor Hall ===
Ferritor Hall is the current home of 31 research laboratories (30 in biological sciences, 1 in geosciences) and nine environmental rooms supporting the study of biological, chemistry and biochemistry. Construction began in 1997 and the facility opened in August 2000. The official dedication ceremony was held March 2, 2001. The building is dedicated to Daniel E. Ferritor, sociology professor and Chancellor Emeritus of the University of Arkansas.

=== Bell Engineering Center ===
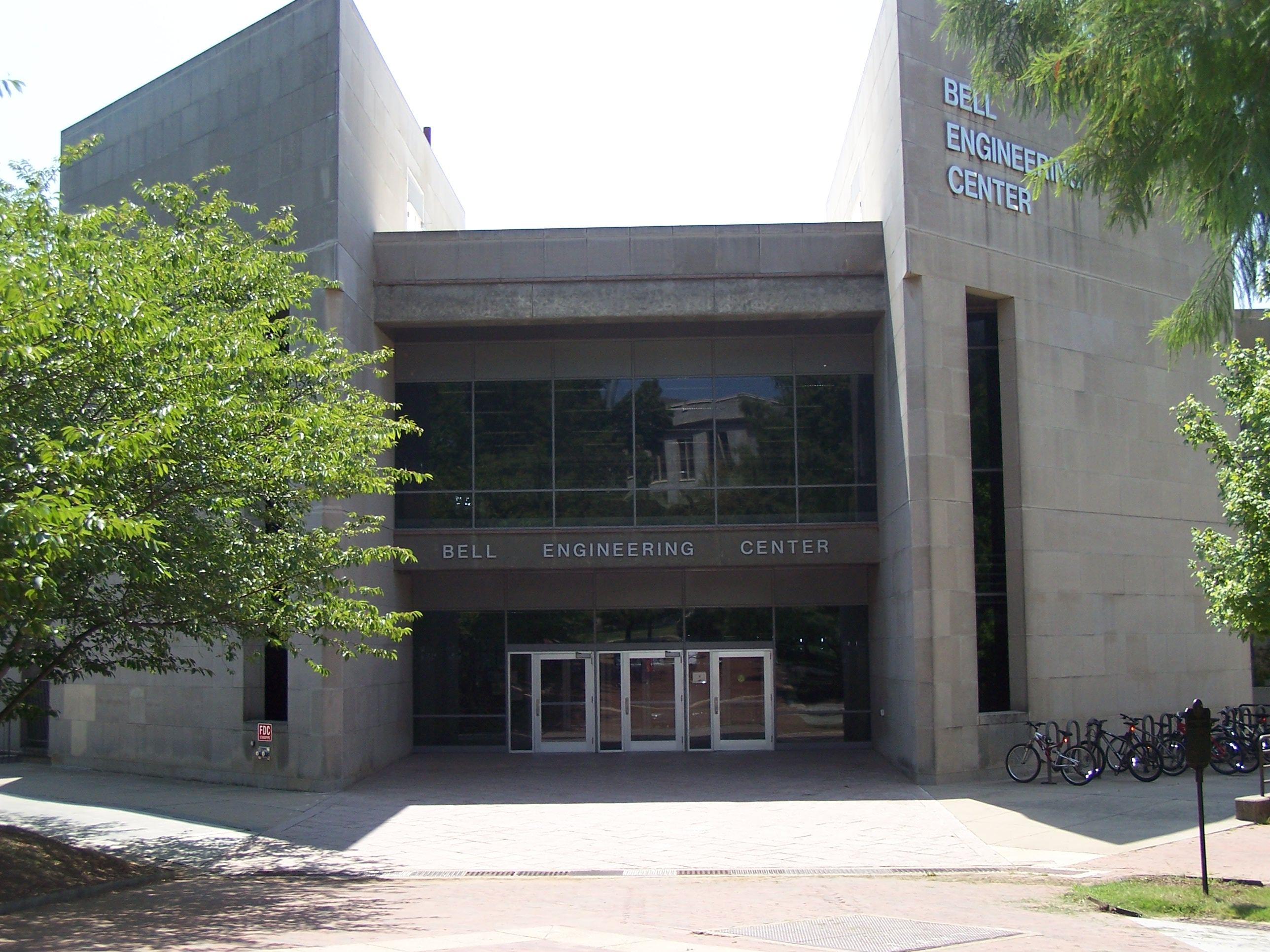
Bell Engineering houses the College of Engineering.

Bell Engineering Center was built in 1987 when the university outgrew Engineering Hall.

=== Razorback Stadium ===
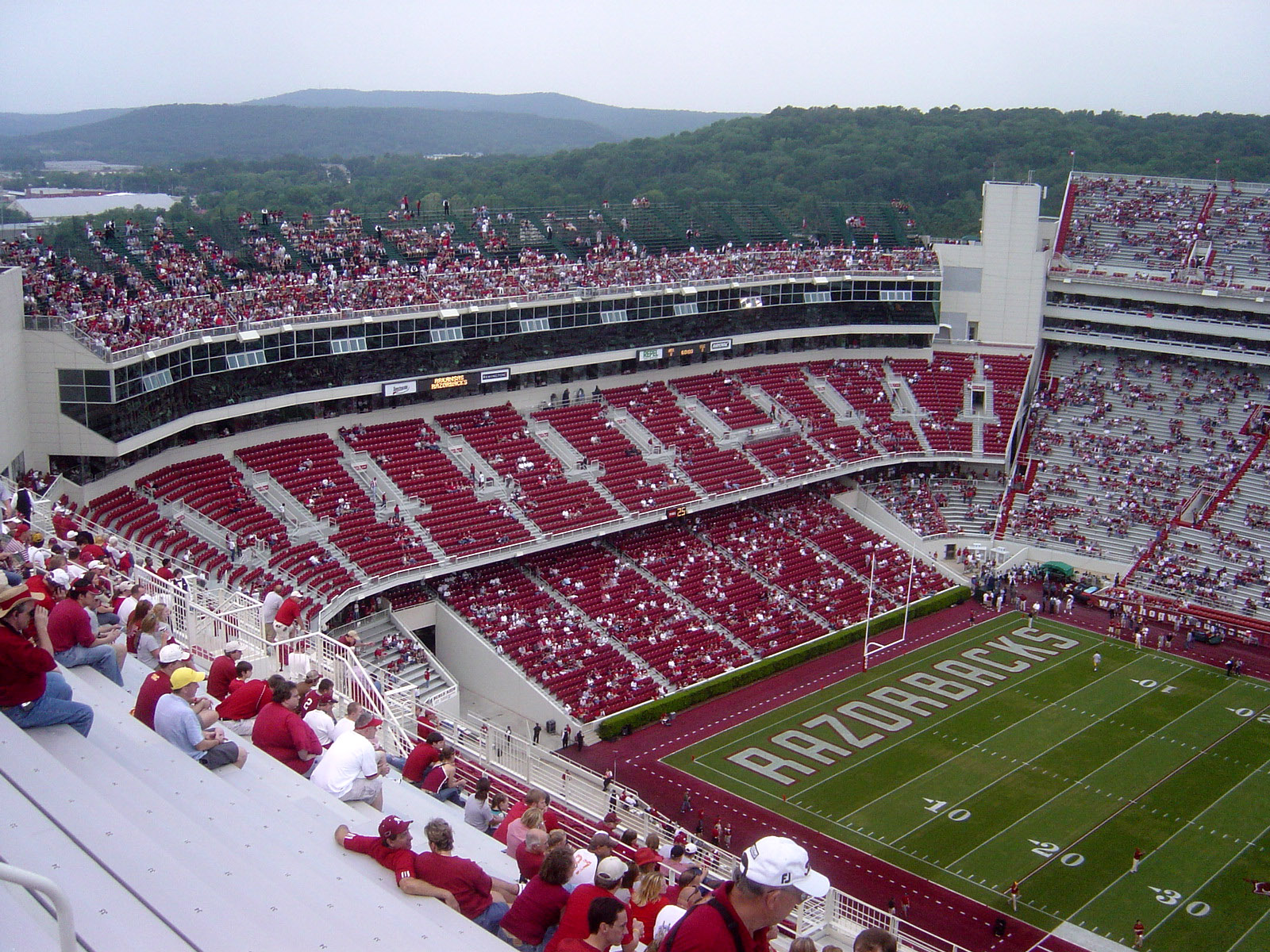
Inside of Razorback Stadium

Donald W. Reynolds Stadium is the main home field of the Arkansas Razorbacks football team (the secondary "home" field being War Memorial Stadium in Little Rock). The actual field of play is officially named "Frank Broyles Field". (The field was dedicated to Frank Broyles on November 3, 2007.) The stadium has an approximate seating capacity of 76,000.

The Frank Broyles Athletics Center, home to the Razorback Athletic Department and named after Frank Broyles, was located at the north end of the Stadium; the Center was built in 1975, renovated in 1994, and demolished in 2016. It featured the Jerry Jones/Jim Lindsey Hall of Champions, a museum to University of Arkansas sports.

=== Bev Lewis Center ===
The Bev Lewis Center for Women's Athletics was partially funded with a gift from Bob and Marilyn Bogle, and named for the University's longtime coach and Women's AD Bev Lewis. The facility was opened in 2003.

=== Bud Walton Arena ===
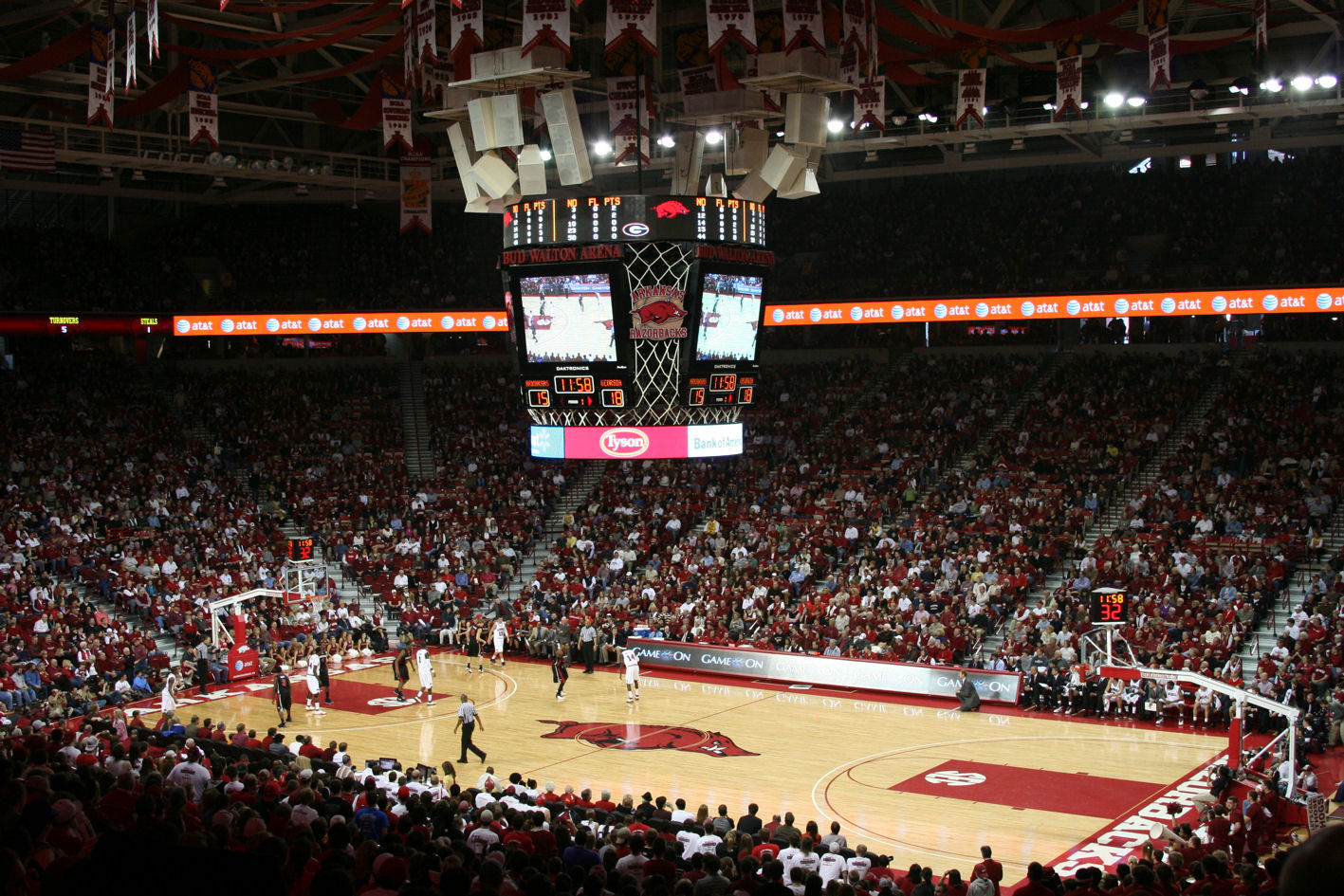
"The Bud" is sometimes called the "Basketball Palace of Mid-America."

Bud Walton Arena is the home of the Arkansas Razorbacks and Lady'Backs basketball teams. It is located in the far west of the campus. The arena seats 19,368 patrons, making it the fifth-largest on-campus arena in college basketball. It is named for James "Bud" Walton, co-founder of Wal-Mart, who donated half of the 30 million price tag for the construction of the arena. The 1993–94 Arkansas Razorbacks men's basketball team won the national championship in the arena's first year.

== Monuments and statues ==
=== Fulbright statue ===
After an international search that produced more than 100 applicants, the University of Arkansas commissioned sculptor Gretta Bader to create a statue of Senator J. William Fulbright to be displayed outside Old Main, home of the J. William Fulbright School of Arts and Sciences. The 7-foot-3 statue faces the Fulbright Peace Fountain and was dedicated in 2002. Former United States President and University of Arkansas faculty member Bill Clinton, Chancellor John White, poet Miller Williams, Fulbright College Dean Donald Bobbitt, and Harriet Fulbright, widow of the late senator all spoke at the dedication ceremony.

=== Fulbright Peace Fountain ===
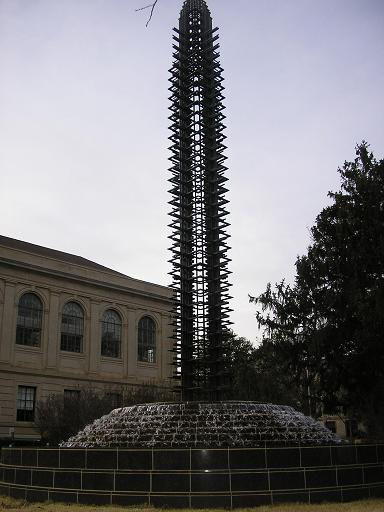
Fulbright Peace Fountatin

The Fulbright Peace Fountain is located between Vol Walker Hall and Old Main. It was completed in 1998, and dedicated on October 24, 1998. It was constructed in honor of J. William Fulbright, and his belief that "education, particularly study abroad, has the power to promote tolerance and understanding among nations." Originally the fountain had water coming up through the middle.

=== Spoofer's Stone ===
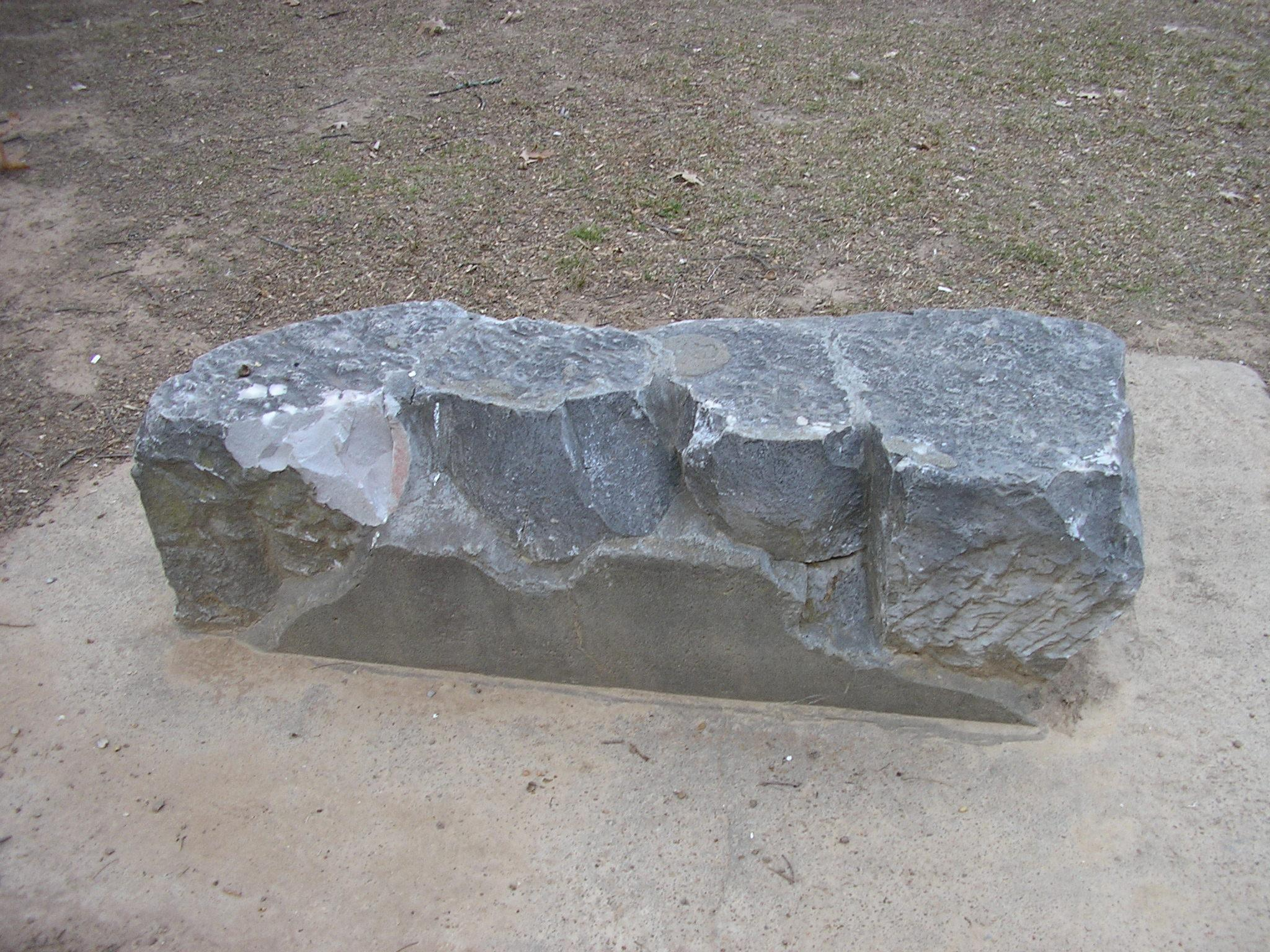
Spoofer's Stone

Spoofer's Stone, according to legend, was to be used for construction of the oldest building on campus, Old Main, which was under construction from 1873 to 1875. Limestone was used for the lintels over windows, among other places. One of the large pieces of limestone being hauled by oxcart to the building site of Old Main slipped off the cart, landing on the ground in front of the building site, and it was left there after cleanup. During the 1880s, the university's authorities forbade the male and female students from being together at most times, requiring them to sit on opposite sides of a classroom, line up on opposite sides of the hallways and avoid each other in social situations. The Spoofer's Stone became a location for lovers to leave notes for one another. Later it became a popular location for men to propose marriage to women. The stone's ragged appearance is due to the tradition of breaking off a piece of the stone after a proposal, a practice which has been forbidden. The origin of the name "Spoofer" or who Spoofer was, is unknown. On Tuesday February 25, 2020 the stone was heavily damaged in a construction related accident. In the accident the stone was broken into several pieces. The University of Arkansas announced the damage on Facebook, but also stated that the plaque on the stone and a large portion that the plaque was attached to remain intact. The University said at the time that plans were already being discussed to restore the monument.

=== Courage to Lead ===
Courage to Lead is a bronze statue depicting Native Americans by Potawatomi sculptor Denny Haskew donated by Don Marr and James Kunzelmann to the J. William Fulbright College of Arts and Sciences. It is located to the north of the Fulbright Peace Fountain and is six feet, four inches tall. The piece depicts a traditional Native American story of warriors shooting arrows into the night sky while standing amongst their falling arrows to show bravery and courage. It was dedicated in 2003.

=== Tri Delta clock ===
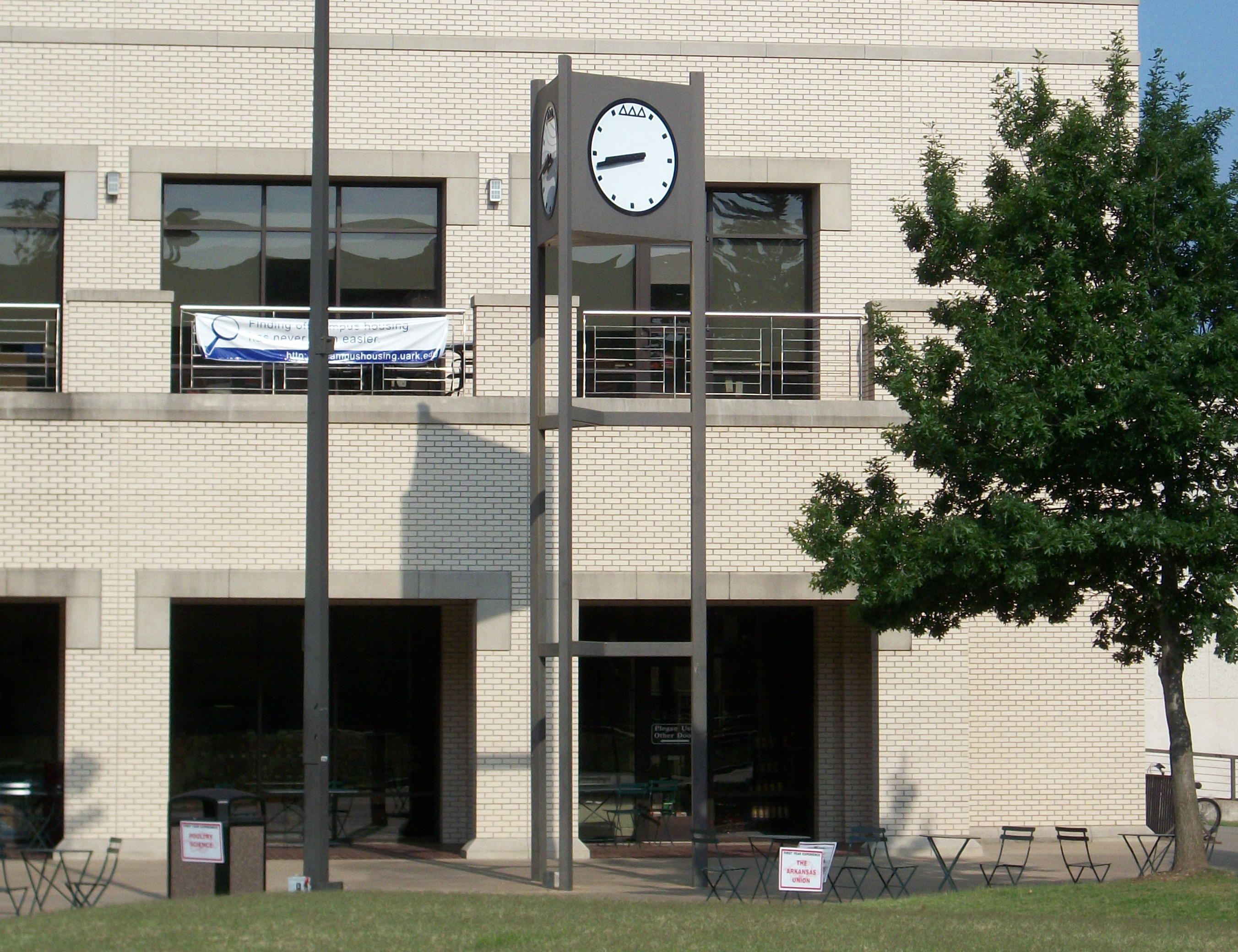
The Tri delta clock in front of the Student Union.

The Tri Delta clock was a gift to the university from the Delta Delta Delta sorority. It is located in front of the Student Union in the center of campus.

== See also ==
- University of Arkansas Campus Historic District
- Spaces and Faces: Namesakes at the University of Arkansas
