= Arkansas Razorbacks =

Sports teams of the University of Arkansas

- University: University of Arkansas
- Nickname: Razorbacks
- NCAA: Division I (FBS)
- Conference: SEC
- Athletic director: Hunter Yurachek
- Location: Fayetteville, Arkansas
- Varsity teams: 19
- Football stadium: Frank Broyles Field at Donald W. Reynolds Razorback Stadium (primary); War Memorial Stadium (secondary)
- Basketball arena: Nolan Richardson Court at Bud Walton Arena
- Baseball stadium: Baum–Walker Stadium at George Cole Field
- Softball stadium: Bogle Park
- Volleyball arena: Barnhill Arena
- Colors: Cardinal and white
- Mascot: Tusk VI & Big Red
- Fight song: Arkansas Fight
- Website: arkansasrazorbacks.com

The Arkansas Razorbacks, also known as the Hogs, are the intercollegiate athletics teams representing the University of Arkansas, located in Fayetteville. The University of Arkansas student body voted to change the name of the school mascot (originally the Cardinals) in 1910 to the Arkansas Razorbacks after a hard-fought battle against LSU in which they were said to play like a "wild band of Razorback hogs" by former coach Hugo Bezdek. The Arkansas Razorbacks are the only major sports team in the U.S. with a porcine nickname, though the Texas A&M–Kingsville Javelinas play in Division II.

The University of Arkansas currently fields 19 total varsity teams (eight men's and 11 women's) in 13 sports, and competes at the National Collegiate Athletic Association (NCAA) Division I (Football Bowl Subdivision in football) level as a member of the Southeastern Conference (SEC).

== History ==
After classes were first held at the university, a contest was held on campus to select school colors. Cardinal (a shade of deep red) was selected over heliotrope, a shade of moderate purple. The first Arkansas football team was formed that same year and was known as the "Arkansas Cardinals". Arkansas merchandise sold at the highest levels in school history during the 2012–13 academic year when royalties through CLC ranked 10th best in the nation.

In 1909, the football team finished a 7–0 season, allowing only 18 points on defense and scoring 186 points on offense. College Football Hall of Fame coach Hugo Bezdek proclaimed his team played "like a wild band of razorback hogs". The name proved so popular that it was changed for the 1910 season. The tradition of calling the hogs, "Woo, Pig! Sooie" was added in the 1920s.

In 1957, Frank Broyles was hired as the head football coach and served in that position for 19 years (1957-1976). Broyles' team was awarded the 1964 National Championship by the Football Writers Association of America and the Helms Athletic Foundation. At the time, the AP Poll and UPI Coaches Poll both awarded their championships before bowl games, and they gave their awards to an undefeated Alabama. However, Alabama lost the 1965 Orange Bowl game to Texas (a team Arkansas defeated in Austin, TX 14-13), while Arkansas won the 1965 Cotton Bowl Classic against Nebraska. The FWAA and HAF both awarded their national championship designations to Arkansas, who was the only team to go undefeated through the bowl games that year. Both the University of Arkansas and the University of Alabama claimed national championships for 1964.

In 1969, Broyles' team was ranked #2 and played the #1-ranked Texas Longhorns, coached by Darrell Royal, in Fayetteville. The game, known as "The Big Shootout" is perhaps the most notable football game in Razorback history. President Richard Nixon was even in attendance. The Razorbacks led 14–0 until the 4th quarter when Texas scored 15 unanswered points and won the game 15-14. Nixon gave Texas the UPI national championship trophy after the game. In the second half, Arkansas missed a field goal attempt, and then turned the ball over inside the Texas 5 yard line on another possession.

After Broyles left coaching to focus on his other job as Athletic Director, he hired Lou Holtz to take over his former position. Holtz served as the head football coach from 1977 through the 1983 season. Under Holtz, the Razorbacks continued their success, beating Oklahoma in the 1978 Orange Bowl to finish the 1977 season 11-1 overall and ranked #3 in the final polls. After finishing the 1978 season 9-2-1 with a tie against UCLA in the 1978 Fiesta Bowl, Arkansas won a share of the Southwest Conference championship in 1979, but lost to Alabama in the 1980 Sugar Bowl to finish 10-2. Holtz's last four teams finished 7-5 in 1980, 8-4 in 1981, 9-2-1 in 1982, and 6-5 in 1983.

In 1971, the women's athletic department was formed. On January 1, 2008, the men's and women's athletic departments merged along with a new athletic director.

The basketball team rose to prominence in the 1970s now under the coaching of Eddie Sutton and with future NBA star Sidney Moncrief along with Marvin Delph and Ron Brewer, three similarly sized Arkansas-bred guards, known as "The Triplets". The team made a Final Four appearance under him, finishing 3rd by defeating Notre Dame on a last-second shot in the now-defunct consolation game.

In the 1980s, the football team was now coached by former Razorback All-American Ken Hatfield (1984-1989), and established itself as a powerful running team. The Razorbacks challenged for the SWC title each year, winning the conference championship in 1988 and 1989, and went to the Cotton Bowl Classic twice. Hatfield's teams established excellent regular-season records, but had difficulty winning bowl games, finishing 1-5 in bowls under Hatfield.

In 1990, Broyles announced that the Razorbacks would leave the Southwest Conference and join the Southeastern Conference beginning in the 1991-92 school year (the football team would play the 1991 season in the SWC while all other sports would compete in the SEC), setting off a major realignment in college football. Now with twelve teams, the SEC broke up into two separate divisions with Arkansas in the West with Alabama, Auburn, Ole Miss, Mississippi State, and LSU. In 1995, the Arkansas Razorbacks won its first SEC Western Division Title in football, but lost to East Division champion Florida in the SEC Championship Game.

In 1994, Nolan Richardson's basketball Razorbacks won the NCAA Tournament. His basketball teams challenged for the SEC and national championships regularly during the 1990s, making three trips to the Final Four (1990, 1994, 1995) and two to the championship game while compiling a record of 389–169 (.697) in his 17 years as the head basketball coach.

On December 10, 1997, Houston Nutt (1998-2007) was hired as head football coach for the Razorbacks to replace Danny Ford, who had been head coach since 1993, and the 1998 season was his first full season. Highly sought after as a Little Rock Central quarterback, Nutt had been the last recruit to sign under Broyles, but transferred to Oklahoma State University because he did not fit Holtz's offensive plans. Nutt would guide the Hogs to 3 SEC West Division title in 1998, 2002, and 2006, plus bowl victories over Texas in the 2000 Cotton Bowl Classic and over Missouri in the 2003 Independence Bowl. Nutt also coached running back Darren McFadden from 2005 to 2007, who would finish his career at Arkansas as the all-time leading rusher in school history, as well as the most decorated player to ever wear a Razorback football uniform. McFadden would be 1st team All-SEC for three years in a row, 1st team All-American in 2006 and 2007, and he would win the Doak Walker Award as the nation's best RB in 2006 and 2007, and the Walter Camp Award in 2007 as the nation's most outstanding player. McFadden would also finish as runner-up for the Heisman Trophy in 2006 and 2007.

Soon after Houston Dale Nutt's departure, two significant things happened. First, AD Broyles retired, and he was replaced by new AD Jeff Long (2008-2017). Second, Long then hired Atlanta Falcons head coach Bobby Petrino (2008-2011), who abruptly departed the NFL to lead the Hogs. After a losing record in his first season, and finishing 8-5 in 2009 after winning the 2010 Liberty Bowl, Petrino led the team to a BCS game in 2010, but lost to Ohio State in the 2011 Sugar Bowl to finish the season 10-3. In 2011 his team would finish 11-2 and ranked #5 in the final polls after beating Kansas State in the 2012 Cotton Bowl Classic, thanks to a heavy passing attack. On April 1, 2012, Petrino drove his motorcycle into a ditch with a passenger aboard. He was fired after it was revealed this passenger was his mistress whom he had hired onto his staff. AD Jeff Long introduced special teams coordinator, and former Michigan State head coach, John L. Smith as the interim coach for the 2012 season in late April.

Smith entered the season as the steward of a preseason Top 10 squad with multiple preseason Heisman hopefuls. He recorded the school's first loss to a Sunbelt team in the program's 100-year history as Louisiana Monroe pulled the upset in Little Rock. In only his second game, he had managed the second-largest drop from the AP ranking narrowly missing the #1 spot held by Michigan after losing the season opener to Appalachian State just five years before.

In 2011, Long hired former Nolan Richardson assistant coach Mike Anderson (2011-2019) as the new men's basketball head coach. Anderson's tenure was an up-and-down roller coaster, featuring highs such as a last second victory over Kentucky in 2015, plus NCAA tournament teams in 2015, 2017, and 2018. But Anderson ultimately failed to take the Razorbacks back to national prominence on a consistent basis, and he was let go by new AD Hunter Yurachek after the 2018-2019 season.

Yurachek then hired Nevada coach Eric Musselman to take over as the new head coach in the 2019-2020 season. Following a 20 win first year, Musselman coached his next two teams to the NCAA's Elite Eight in the 2021 and 2022 tournaments. Both teams finished ranked in the AP Top 20 and the UPI Top 10.

On December 4, 2012, the school named former University of Wisconsin coach Bret Bielema (2013-2017) as head coach for the 2013 season. Coach Bielema rebuilt the team around a power running game and strong defense and led the Hogs back to a winning record in 2014 including back-to-back shutouts over top ten teams, the first time in history such a feat had been accomplished by an unranked team, and a victory over Texas in the 2014 Texas Bowl at the end of the season. Bielema would coach Arkansas to another bowl victory in 2015, beating Kansas State in the 2016 Liberty Bowl. However, his team collapsed in the last couple of games in 2016, and then stumbled to a losing record in 2017. AD Jeff Long had already been let go by the school prior to the end of the 2017 season, and interim AD Julie Cromer fired Bielema after the final game.

Cromer then hired SMU head coach Chad Morris (2018-2019) as the new head coach after the 2017 season. Cromer would then leave Arkansas to become the AD at Ohio University in the summer of 2019 after she was replaced by current Athletics Director Hunter Yurachek in early 2018. Morris' tenure as the head coach of the football team is considered one of the worst in school history. Over one full season, and a shortened second season, Morris never won an SEC game, and both of his teams would finish with abysmal records of 2-10. Yurachek fired Morris with two games left in the 2019 season, and promoted tight ends coach Barry Lunney Jr to interim head coach for the final two games. Lunney left after the season was over, and Yurachek hired Georgia offensive line coach Sam Pittman as Arkansas' new head coach. Pittman had been the Razorbacks offensive line coach under Bielema from 2013 to 2015, and had produced some of the best linemen, and offensive lines, in school history. Several former players signed a petition asking Yurachek to hire Pittman.

In 2020, Arkansas only played ten games (all teams from the SEC) due to the COVID-19 pandemic. Arkansas' last conference victory had been on October 28, 2017 against Ole Miss. On October 3, 2020, Pittman's Razorbacks broke a 20-game SEC losing streak by defeating Mississippi St in Starkville, 21-14. The team would finish the SEC-only season at 3-7, also beating Ole Miss and Tennessee. Pittman's 2021 squad would improve upon the previous season in a big way, going 9-4 overall after beating Penn State in the 2022 Outback Bowl on New Year's Day, and finish ranked in the final AP Top 25 at #21. Pittman would be named the 2021 AFCA Region 2 Coach of the Year.

== Sports sponsored ==
SEC logo in Arkansas' colors

Men's sports	Women's sports
Baseball	
Basketball	Basketball
Cross country	Cross country
Football	
	Gymnastics
Golf	Golf
	Soccer
	Softball
	Swimming & diving
Tennis	Tennis
Track & field^{†}	Track & field^{†}
	Volleyball
† – Track and field includes both indoor and outdoor.

=== Men's sports ===
==== Baseball ====
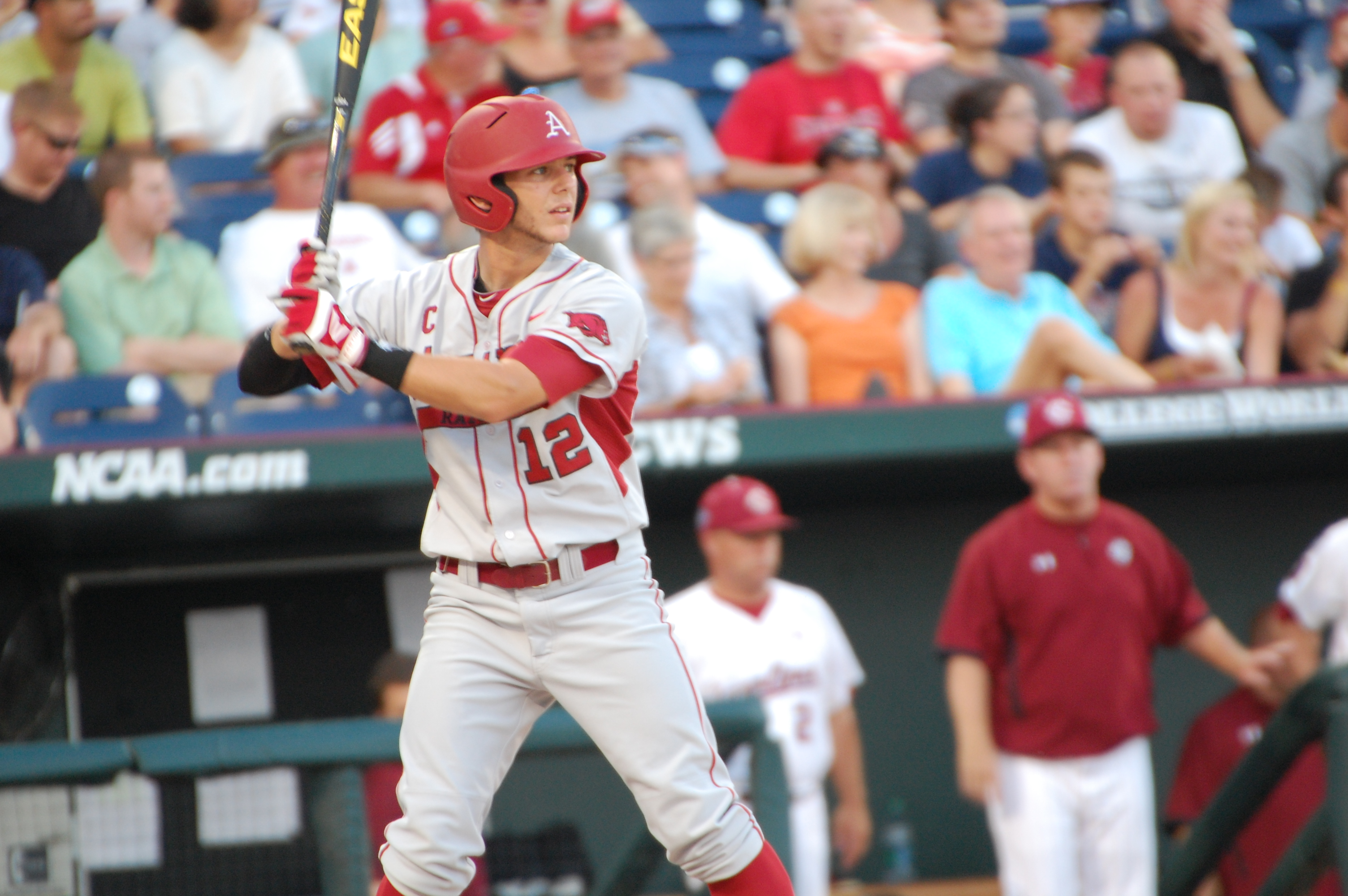
Bo Bigham bats for the Razorbacks at the 2012 College World Series

The baseball team, led by former Razorback Dave Van Horn, has reached the postseason NCAA tournament every year except one (2016) since he began coaching the team in 2003. In 2012, they reached the College World Series compiling a 2–0 record in Omaha before falling in consecutive games to two times defending national champion South Carolina in the championship of Bracket Two. South Carolina was defeated in the National Championship Series by Arizona.

The Razorbacks most recently also reached the 2018 College World Series where they finished runner-up to Oregon State, joining previous appearances in Omaha in 1979 (finished runner-up); 1985; 1987, 1989, 2004, 2009, and 2015. The team plays home games at Baum Stadium, located just south of campus, and which finished several major renovations in 2004 and 2009.

Many Razorbacks players have gone on to the majors, perhaps the most successful is Cliff Lee, the 2008 AL Cy Young Award Winner, with the most recent being Dallas Keuchel of the Houston Astros.

==== Basketball ====
The basketball team plays its home games in Bud Walton Arena on the University of Arkansas campus. One of the top 10 NCAA programs of all time, the Razorbacks were ushered into the modern era on the shoulders of Coach Eddie Sutton (800 game-winner). Under the leadership of Nolan Richardson, the Razorbacks won the NCAA tournament in 1994 defeating Duke University, and appeared in the championship game the following year, but were beaten by UCLA. The Razorbacks have been to NCAA Final Four in 1941, 1945, 1978, 1990, 1994 and 1995, though the first two were achieved before the NCAA gathered the final four teams in one site.

The current head coach for the men's basketball team is John Calipari. Calipari replaced former head coach Eric Musselman who lead Arkansas to two Elite Eights and a Sweet Sixteen appearance. On March 26, 2007, Stan Heath was fired as the head coach of the men's basketball team. John Pelphrey ultimately replaced Heath and made the 2008 NCAA Division I men's basketball tournament, but did not make any subsequent postseason appearances and was fired after the 2010–11 season. Pelphrey compiled a 69–59 overall record and 25–39 SEC conference record while at Arkansas. Mike Anderson was announced as the new men's Basketball head coach on March 23, 2011.

==== Football ====
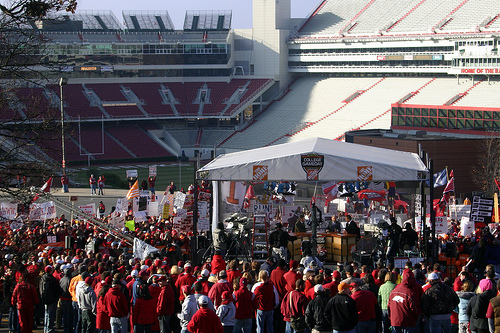
ESPN College Gameday at the University of Arkansas

The football team plays its home games either at Donald W. Reynolds Razorback Stadium, located on the University of Arkansas campus in Fayetteville, or at War Memorial Stadium, located in Little Rock. In 1964, the Razorbacks were the only team to go through the regular season and a bowl game undefeated, and they were awarded the Football Writers Association of America National Championship. The 1969 team, led by quarterback Bill Montgomery, challenged the Texas Longhorns for a national championship in the Game of the Century.

==== Track and field ====
The track and field team was under the direction of John McDonnell for over 25 years (since the 1977–78 academic year). McDonnell's men's teams have won 41 NCAA championships since 1984, including 11 cross country, 20 indoor track and 10 outdoor track along with 37 Southwest Conference championships, and 38 of 40 SEC titles. The Razorbacks, under his direction, won five NCAA National Triple Crowns, achieved by winning NCAA titles in cross country, indoor and outdoor track in the same school year. Arkansas and the University of Texas-El Paso (UTEP) are the only teams to have ever won the National Triple Crown. The track and field Razorbacks men completely dominated the sport during the 1990s, winning 24 of the 30 available titles. From 2008-2025 Coach Chris Bucknam was at the helm, and his teams continued to dominate the NCAA. Bucknam's men's teams won multiple SEC triple crowns along with two NCAA national championships. Now under the direction of coaches Doug Case, Rob Jarvis, Cale Wallace, and Brandon Battle, the men's track and field team continues the tradition. In his first year as head coach, Case's men's team won both the SEC Indoor and Outdoor Titles, as well as both the NCAA Indoor and Outdoor Championships. With the addition of the 2026 titles, that brings the overall total of NCAA championships to 44 for the men's team (11 XC, 22 indoors, and 11 outdoors).

==== Golf ====
The Razorbacks golf teams are based at The Blessings golf course in Fayetteville. From the back tees of the course, the rating is 79.1 and its slope is 153, making it one of the most difficult golf courses in the U.S.

John Daly remains an avid fan of the Razorbacks even after the University of Arkansas misplaced his 1991 PGA Championship trophy that he loaned to them.

The men's golf team has won three conference championships: 1958 Southwest Conference and 1995 and 2019 Southeastern Conference. R. H. Sikes won the NCAA Championship in 1963 and the team place second in 2009.

=== Women's sports ===
==== Basketball ====
Razorback Women during a basketball game.

The Razorback women's basketball team plays home games in Bud Walton Arena, often referred to as the "Basketball Palace of Mid-America". The building is located on the University of Arkansas campus. The women's basketball team completed its 39th season in 2014–15, and has made 21 postseason appearances (from AIAW through the current NCAA era). The Razorbacks' made their first NCAA Women's Final Four appearance in 1998, with the help of team leader Christy Smith.

==== Cross country ====
The cross country track team is led by head coach Chris Johnson. They practice and compete on cross country course at the university's Agricultural Experiment Station north of the main campus. The course is also home to the men's cross country team. Harter is the first Arkansas coach to have his team ranked No. 1 in the nation, and has won more SEC cross country titles than any other member institution. The women's team won its first national championship at the NCAA Women's Division I Cross Country Championship in Terre Haute, Indiana, in November 2019. The win completed a calendar-year sweep after the university's indoor and outdoor track and field teams won their respective championships.

==== Golf ====
The golf team is headed by coach Shauna Estes-Taylor. The team practices both at Blessings course, which is located a few minutes from the University of Arkansas campus in Johnson, Arkansas, and also at the Fred W. and Mary B. Smith Razorback Golf Training Facility—which is also located at Blessings course—which features both indoor and outdoor practice areas. The men's golf team utilizes both areas as well.

==== Gymnastics ====
The gymnastics team is referred to as the GymBacks. They are head coached by former US Olympian Jordyn Wieber. They practice in the Bev Lewis Center for Women's Athletics and compete in Barnhill Arena, both of which are located on the University of Arkansas campus. The Gym'Backs have five NCAA Regional appearances (2004, 2005, 2006, 2007, 2008), advanced two individuals (Dana McQuillin and Casey Jo Magee) to the NCAA Championship and hosted the 2006 NCAA South Central Regional.

At the 2006 Regionals, the Gym'Backs placed second in a six-team field, qualifying them for the NCAA National Championships for the first time. They repeated this feat in 2008.

Also in 2008, team members Michelle Stout and Casey Jo Magee, became the Gym'Backs first All-Americans. Stout reached the first-team status on vault while Magee became a two-time second-team member on vault and uneven bars.

The team is also the only team in the entire NCAA to have a coaching staff composed entirely of olympians.

==== Soccer ====
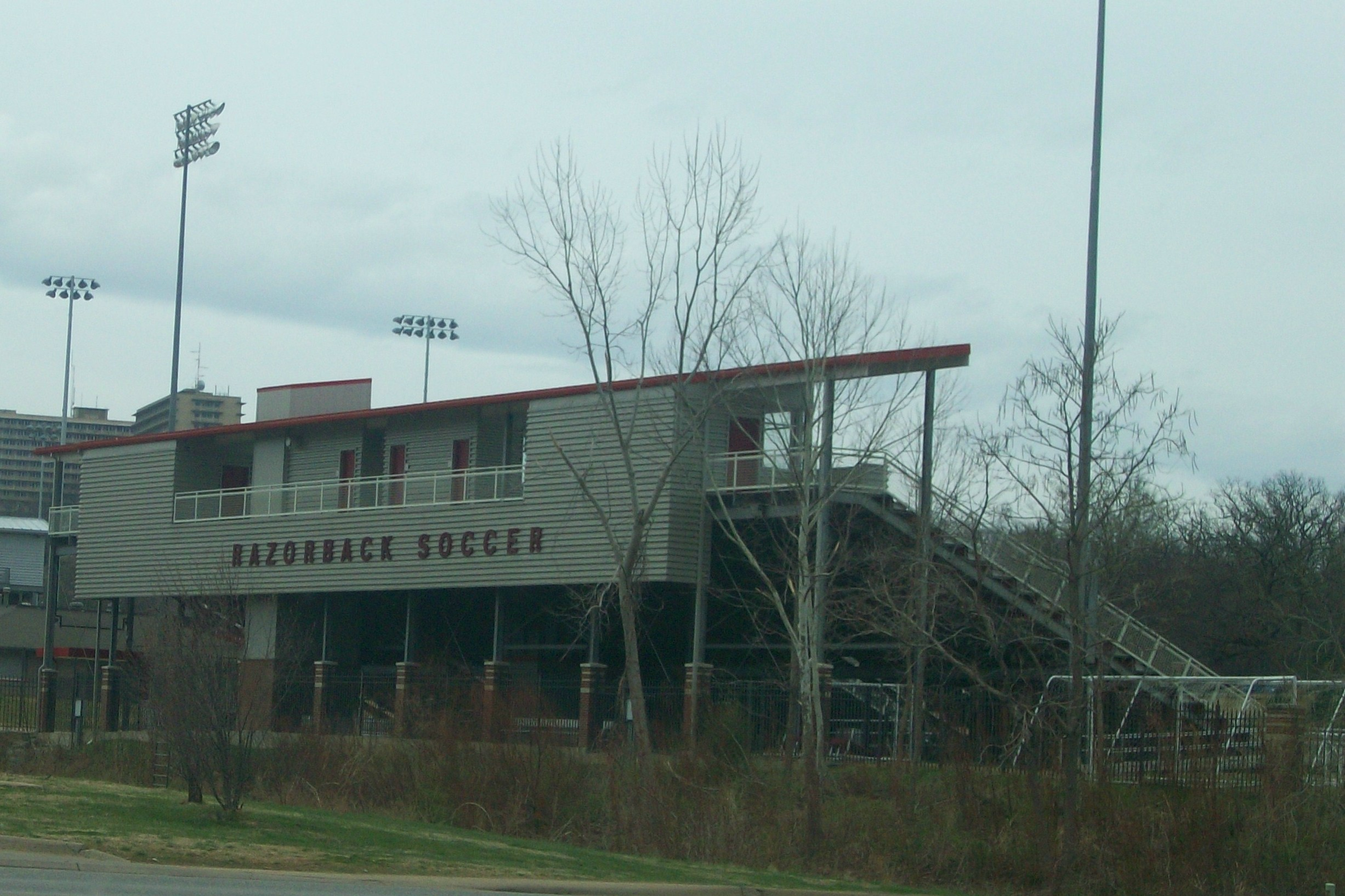
Razorback Soccer Stadium

The soccer team is head coached by Colby Hale, and practice/play on Arkansas Field which is an exclusively soccer field on campus. Arkansas soccer is one of the oldest programs in the Southeastern Conference, competing as a varsity sport since 1986.

==== Softball ====
The softball team is coached by Courtney Deifel. They practice and play at Bogle Park, which opened during the 2008–09 season.

==== Swimming and diving ====
The swimming and diving team is coached by Neil Harper. The team's facilities are the University of Arkansas Natatorium, which is located inside the HPER building (which also is home to student intramural facilities).

==== Tennis ====
The tennis team's head coach is Michael Hegarty. The team's facilities are the Billingsley Center (outdoor) and the adjacent Dills Indoor Tennis Center. Tennis is one of the oldest varsity sports at Arkansas with a continuous history from the first year of the Women's Athletics Department in 1971–1972.

Arkansas announced in April 2026 that it would drop men's and women's tennis after the 2025–26 season, but less than a month later reinstated both teams without interruption.

==== Track and field ====
The track and field team is coached by Chris Johnson, who began in 2023, and has won nine NCAA Division I championships since 2015, five in indoor track and field and three in outdoor track and field and one in cross country. The team also swept the 2019 calendar, winning the indoor, outdoor and cross country national championships.

The team has indoor training and racing facilities at the Randal Tyson Track Center and outdoor facilities at John McDonnell Field. The teams are the most successful in the Southeastern Conference, winning 16 league titles including the first-ever SEC women's triple crown (a sweep of cross country, indoor and outdoor titles in the same season). His program produced numerous NCAA champions and most recently Athens Olympics medalists Veronica Campbell (two gold medals and a bronze for Jamaica in sprints) and Deena (Drossin) Kastor. Kastor is one of America's premier distance runners, earning a marathon bronze medal in Athens and holding numerous distance and marathon records.

==== Volleyball ====
The volleyball team has been coached by Jason Watson since 2016. They practice and play in Barnhill Arena. Robert Pulliza was the previous coach, from 2008 to 2015. Before Pulliza took over for Chris Poole in 2008, Poole's teams had won 11 SEC Western Division from their inaugural season in 1994.

== Notable non-varsity sports ==
=== Rugby ===
Founded in 1971, the University of Arkansas Rugby Club is the longest-tenured sports club on campus. Arkansas plays college rugby in the Division 1 Heart of America conference, a conference composed mostly of Big 12 and SEC teams. The team plays at Walker Park, just south of the Donald W. Reynolds Stadium. Arkansas rugby is led by head coach Warren Fyfe.

Arkansas has consistently been one of the best teams in the Heart of America conference, winning the conference title in the 2009–10 and 2010–11 school years, and finishing second in 2011–12. Arkansas defeated Kansas 28–12 to reach the finals of the 2012 Heart of America 7s tournament, where they lost to Lindenwood.

=== Ice hockey ===
The Razorback hockey program was founded in 2007 as a club team playing in the ACHA's Division III. Playing their first full season in 2008–09, the Hogs posted a 6–6–0 record in the SECHC: since then, the team has yet to record a losing season, with five SECHC titles in their history. This success allowed the first team to move up to ACHA Division I in 2015–16, playing in the WCHL: a second team was added by the club that remains in DIII and the SECHC. Eventually, the teams would merge back into one, play at the Division II level, and move to the MACHA when the SECHC left ACHA for a rival sanctioning body. In 2021, the Ice Hogs reached the ACHA Division II national final but lost to Hope College. Home games are played at the Jones Center Rink in nearby Springdale and attract large crowds, reflecting the growth in popularity of hockey in Northwest Arkansas. The club's biggest rival is Missouri State: the Razorbacks and Ice Bears play an annual home-and-away series, with great attendance at both venues.

=== Cycling ===
The University of Arkansas Cycling Club is one of the fastest-growing sports clubs on campus. For the past five years, Arkansas Cycling Club has hosted its annual cycling event, the Arkansas Classic, which attracts collegiate and non-collegiate cyclists from over 10 states, some from as far as Minnesota and Wisconsin. The club represents the university in the South Central Collegiate Cycling Conference (SCCCC), competing against teams from Texas, Oklahoma and Louisiana. Arkansas Cycling competes in most disciplines of cycling, especially Road and Mountain at the local, state, regional and national levels.

== Rivalries ==
Through the administrations of athletic directors John Barnhill, George Cole, Frank Broyles, and Jeff Long, the University of Arkansas maintained a policy of not competing against other in-state Division I schools. There are four other Division I schools in the state of Arkansas: Arkansas State University in Jonesboro, the University of Arkansas at Little Rock (athletically branded as "Little Rock"), University of Arkansas at Pine Bluff, and the University of Central Arkansas in Conway. ASU is the only school of the three to compete in the Football Bowl Subdivision; Little Rock does not have football, while Arkansas–Pine Bluff and Central Arkansas compete in the Football Championship Subdivision.

Arkansas played its first football game against Arkansas–Pine Bluff in 2021 at War Memorial Stadium in Little Rock; they returned there in 2024. Its first football game against Arkansas State took place on September 5, 2025 at War Memorial Stadium, resulting in an Arkansas win 56-14. It has yet to play Central Arkansas in football, though they did play in basketball in 2024.

Historically, Arkansas' most heated rivalry was with the Longhorns of the University of Texas. However, the rivalry became much less intense since the two teams joined different conferences in the early 1990s; they met infrequently until Texas joined Arkansas in the Southeastern Conference in fall 2024, when their football rivalry resumed. Texas leads the series in football and baseball, while Arkansas holds the series lead in basketball and track & field.

Another rival from the state of Texas is Texas A&M. During their Southwest Conference rivalry days, the two teams played annually in all sports. In 2009, the football rivalry resumed again on an annual basis, played each year at AT&T Stadium (except 2012, 2013 & 2020) thru 2024. The rivalry in all other sports resumed in the fall of 2012 after A&M joined the SEC.

Since joining the Southeastern Conference the Razorbacks have developed a rivalry with Louisiana State University (LSU Tigers) in football. The game between these two teams usually takes place near the end of the season and has sometimes decided the SEC Western Division Championship. The winner of this game takes home the "Golden Boot" which is a gold trophy in the shape of the two states. Arkansas took the Golden Boot home in 2007 with a 50–48 win over the #1 ranked Tigers in Baton Rouge. This was their first time winning the trophy since 2002. Arkansas and LSU have also built a rivalry in baseball, as the two schools have been at the top of the NCAA attendance standings for the past several seasons. In 2001, despite coming into the series in last place in the SEC West, Arkansas swept a three-game series from top-ranked LSU, which won the 2000 College World Series, in Fayetteville. Since the University of Missouri has entered the Southeastern Conference, a new rivalry was created in 2014 called the Battle Line Rivalry that goes back and forth between both school in Football.

In basketball, the primary rival for the Razorbacks in the SEC is the Wildcats of the University of Kentucky. This rivalry developed in the 1990s during the coaching tenures of Rick Pitino at Kentucky and Nolan Richardson at Arkansas when both Kentucky and Arkansas were annually in competition for a national title.

In baseball, the main rivals of the Razorbacks are the LSU Tigers and the Ole Miss Rebels. In 2022, Arkansas and Ole Miss met each other in the College World Series. The Rebels won the first contest while the Razorbacks took the second, but it was Ole Miss who won the third and advanced to the National Championship. Ole Miss defeated Oklahoma to win their first national title in baseball.

== Mascots ==
Tusk, the live mascot for the University of Arkansas.

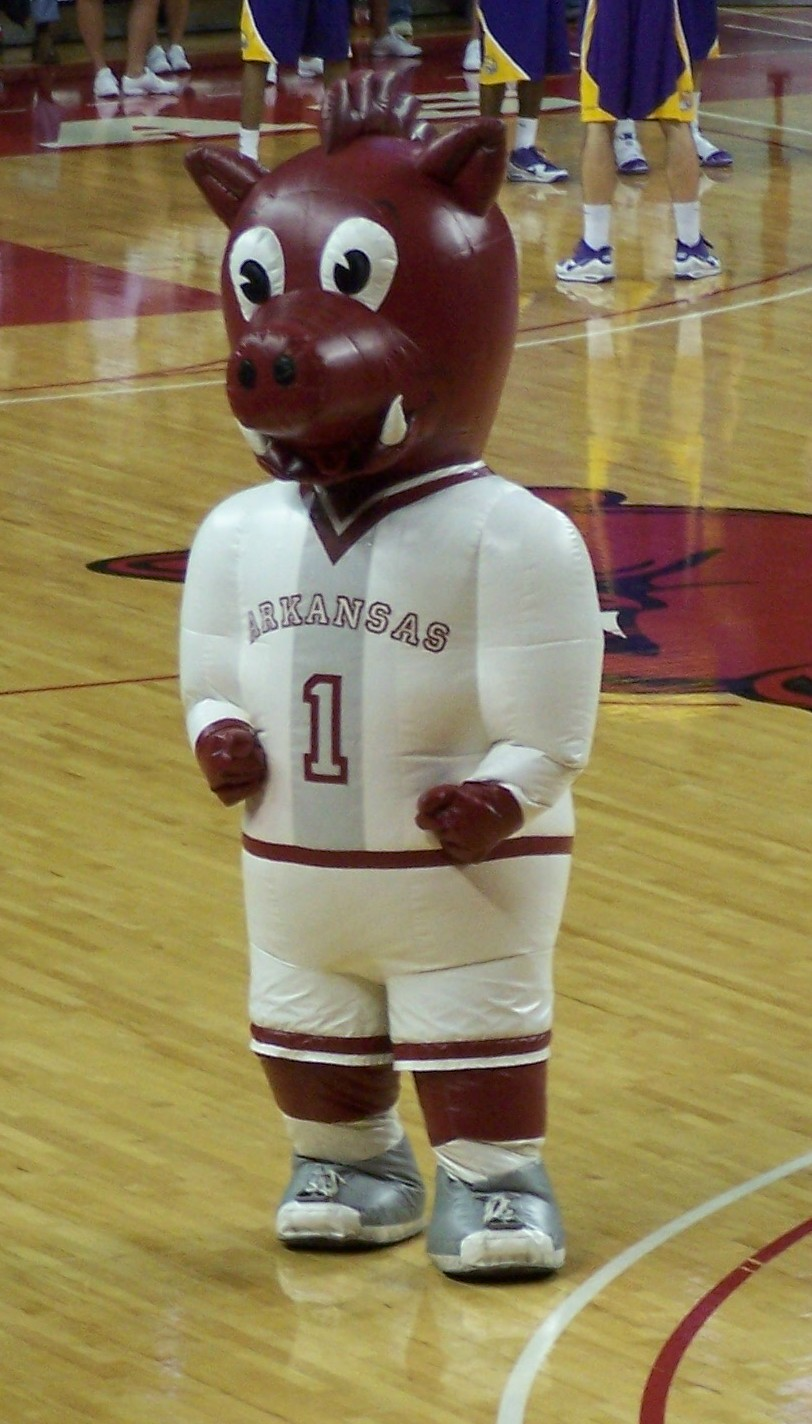
Boss Hog entertains fans at a basketball game in 2010.

The live mascot for the University of Arkansas is named Tusk. He is a Russian boar that weighs in at approximately 400 pounds. Tusk currently resides on the Stokes family farm in Dardanelle, Ark., and makes a two-hour trek up to Northwest Arkansas for every Razorback football game. The current mascot, Tusk VI, is a direct descendant of Tusk I. The live mascot program at Arkansas is supported by the Tusk Fund, which is administered by the Razorback Foundation.

There are a number of costumed mascots for the University of Arkansas Razorbacks that attend most major sporting events. Big Red (aka the "Fighting Razorback") is the traditional mascot for the university and represents the intimidating fighting spirit of the Razorbacks at all athletic events. Sue E., is the female hog and is famous for her costume changes and dancing ability. Pork Chop is the "kid" mascot. Ribby is the baseball team's mascot. Boss Hog, a nine-foot inflatable mascot, joined the mascot family during the 1998–99 football season.

The Razorback was officially adopted as the university's mascot in 1909 after Hugo Bezdek, the coach at the time, stated after a big win that his team played like a "wild band of razorback hogs". Subsequently, the razorback became the mascot for the entire university, replacing the cardinals as the official mascot. The only current athletic logo for the university is the classic or running hog as has been depicted on the program's football helmets. The university has ceased manufacture of memorabilia with any of the other logos in an attempt to re-brand the athletic department.

== National team championships ==
=== NCAA team championships ===
Arkansas has won 54 NCAA team national championships.

- Men's (45)
  - Basketball (1): 1994
  - Cross Country (11): 1984, 1986, 1987, 1990, 1991, 1992, 1993, 1995, 1998, 1999, 2000
  - Indoor Track & Field (22): 1984, 1985, 1986, 1987, 1988, 1989, 1990, 1991, 1992, 1993, 1994, 1995, 1997, 1998, 1999, 2000, 2003, 2005, 2006, 2013, 2023, 2026
  - Outdoor Track & Field (11): 1985, 1992, 1993, 1994, 1995, 1996, 1997, 1998, 1999, 2003, 2004 (vacated), 2005 (vacated), 2026
- Women's (9)
  - Cross Country (1): 2019
  - Indoor Track & Field (5): 2015, 2019, 2021, 2023, 2024
  - Outdoor Track & Field (3): 2016, 2019, 2024
- see also
  - List of NCAA schools with the most NCAA Division I championships
  - SEC NCAA team championships

=== Other national team championships ===
- Men's
  - Football (1): 1964

Arkansas' 1964 football team was recognized contemporaneously as the national champion by the Football Writers Association of America, Helms Athletic Foundation and Poling System, and retroactively by the College Football Researchers Association, Billingsley Report, National Championship Foundation, and Sagarin Ratings. Although the NCAA has never bestowed championships at the highest level of football, the NCAA website lists Arkansas as one of three national champions in 1964 as chosen by selecting organizations, along with Alabama and Notre Dame.

== Notable athletes ==
=== Football ===
- Brandon Burlsworth – went from walk-on in 1995 to All-American offensive lineman in 1998, drafted in the 3rd round by the Indianapolis Colts in 1999, died less than a month after he was drafted in a car accident, subject of the 2016 film Greater (film).
- Joe Adams – All-American returner in 2011, played for the Carolina Panthers.
- Fred Akers – former head coach at University of Texas.
- Lance Alworth – played for the San Diego Chargers, won Super Bowl VI with the Dallas Cowboys. Pro Football Hall of Fame and College Football Hall of Fame member.
- Gary Anderson – USFL and NFL running back.
- Shawn Andrews – 2× All-SEC, 2× All-American in 2002 and 2003, played for the Philadelphia Eagles.
- Steve Atwater – All-American in 1988, eight-time Pro Bowler for the Denver Broncos where won Super Bowls XXXII and XXXIII. Member of the Pro Football Hall of Fame.
- Jim Benton – played for the Cleveland Rams, Chicago Bears, and Los Angeles Rams in the 1930s and 1940s. Member of the NFL 1940s All-Decade Team.
- John Bond – offensive coordinator for the Georgia Tech Yellow Jackets football team.
- William "Bud" Brooks – All American and winner of the Outland Trophy for the nation's best interior lineman in 1954.
- Frank Broyles – played football at Georgia Tech for Coach Bobby Dodd, but as coach found success throughout the 1960s. Under Broyles, Arkansas claimed the 1964 national championship. After retiring from coaching in 1976, has been well known as the Arkansas men's athletic director (1974–2007) and a broadcaster for ABC Sports. Member, College Football Hall of Fame.
- Fred Childress – All SWC in 1988, six-time all-star offensive lineman in the CFL.
- Greg Childs – played for the Minnesota Vikings.
- Butch Davis – NFL and college head coach.
- Knile Davis – An NFL tailback for the Kansas City Chiefs
- Joe Ferguson – starting QB for the Buffalo Bills from the mid-1970s to the early 1980s.
- Barry Foster – played for Pittsburgh Steelers.
- Ken Hamlin – drafted by the Seattle Seahawks, played for the Dallas Cowboys.
- Dan Hampton – All-American in 1978, played for the Chicago Bears where he won Super Bowl XX. Pro Football Hall of Fame member.
- Dave Hanner – member of the Green Bay Packers Hall of Fame.
- Ken Hatfield – member of the 1964 national championship team at Arkansas. He went on to be the head football coach at the Air Force Academy, the University of Arkansas where he won back-to-back SWC championships in 1988 and 1989, Clemson University, and Rice University.
- Wayne Harris – member of the Canadian Football Hall of Fame.
- Hunter Henry - 2015 All-American, won the 2015 Mackey Award given to the nation's top TE, drafted by the Los Angeles Chargers, plays for the New England Patriots.
- Madre Hill – 1st team SEC in 1995, played for the Cleveland Browns, Berlin Thunder (NFL Europe), San Diego Chargers, Oakland Raiders and in Super Bowl XXXVII. Considered one of the greatest running backs to come out of the University of Arkansas.
- Red Hickey – NFL player and head coach; credited with creating the shotgun formation.
- Peyton Hillis – Former NFL Running Back, Madden 12 cover athlete.
- Chris Houston - A starting cornerback for the Detroit Lions and the NFL Interception Return yards leader (2011)
- Jim Lee Howell – NFL player and head coach.
- John Jenkins – head coach for University of Houston and in the Canadian Football League.
- Dennis Johnson – Tail Back for the Houston Texans
- Jimmy Johnson – member of the 1964 national championship team at Arkansas. He went on to be the head football coach at Oklahoma State University, the University of Miami where he won the 1987 national championship, the Dallas Cowboys where he won Super Bowls XXVII and XXVIII, and the Miami Dolphins.
- Felix Jones – All-American kick returner in 2007. 2008 first-round draft pick of the Dallas Cowboys. Played for the Pittsburgh Steelers.
- Jerry Jones – member of the 1964 national championship team at Arkansas. He is the owner of the Dallas Cowboys.
- Matt Jones – best running QB in school history, first-round draft selection of the Jacksonville Jaguars. Jones also played for the Razorbacks in basketball.
- Kenoy Kennedy – played for the Detroit Lions.
- Steve Little – one of top college kicker/punter combos, kicking an NCAA record 67-yard field goal in 1977. Played for St. Louis Cardinals.
- Jonathan Luigs – All American and 2006 winner of the Dave Rimington Trophy given to the most outstanding center in the nation.
- Ryan Mallett – Former backup quarterback for the New England Patriots, Houston Texas, and Baltimore Ravens.
- Darren McFadden – winner of 2006 and 2007 Doak Walker Award given to the nation's best RB, 2006 and 2007 Heisman Trophy runner-up and winner of the 2008 Walter Camp college football player of the year award. 2× All-American, 3× All-SEC. UA all-time leader in most rushing stats. 2008 first-round draft pick of the Oakland Raiders.
- Marcus Monk – played for the Chicago Bears, New York Giants, and Carolina Panthers.
- Bill Montgomery- member of the University of Arkansas Sports Hall of Honor and QB during the 1969 Big Shootout.
- Jerry P. Moore – Arkansas highest drafted player in 1971 (round 4, pick 11, 89 overall) by Chicago Bears; ""Brian Piccolo Award"" recipient. All-Southwest Conference First Team DB 1970; Letterman – 1968, 1969, 1970; Senior Bowl – Mobile, Alabama 1971; All-American Game – Lubbock, Texas 1971; PRO 1971–74: Chicago Bears, New Orleans Saints
- Jason Peters – Starting offensive lineman for the Philadelphia Eagles.
- Loyd Phillips – member of the College Football Hall of Fame and 1966 winner of the Outland Trophy for the best interior linemen in the country.
- Billy Ray Smith Jr. – 2× All-American in 1981 and 1982, first round draft selection in 1983 draft; played for the San Diego Chargers, 1983–1992. Inducted into College Football Hall of Fame.
- Billy Ray Smith Sr. – longtime NFL defensive lineman
- Pat Summerall – played ten years in the NFL, primarily as a kicker; best known as a broadcaster, gaining prominence with his partner John Madden.
- Barry Switzer – assistant coach on the 1964 national championship team at Arkansas, He went on to be the head football coach at the University of Oklahoma where he won 3 national championships and for the Dallas Cowboys where he won Super Bowl XXX.
- Boo Williams – receiver for the New Orleans Saints 2000–06
- Dennis Winston – defensive lineman for the Pittsburgh Steelers and New Orleans Saints.
- Tyler Wilson – 1st team SEC in 2011, an NFL quarterback for the Oakland Raiders
- Jarius Wright – 1st team SEC in 2011, WR for the Minnesota Vikings.

=== Basketball ===
- Darius Acuff Jr. – Consensus first-team All-American, SEC Player of the Year, and Jerry West Award recipient in 2026.
- John Adams – 1941 All-American and one of several individuals credited with inventing the jump shot.
- Corey Beck – a member of the 1994 national championship team, and played for four seasons in the NBA most notably with the Charlotte Hornets
- Patrick Beverley – three-time NBA All-Defensive Team member and current point guard for the Los Angeles Clippers.
- Ron Brewer – drafted by the Portland Trail Blazers in the first round (7th pick) of the 1978 NBA draft. Played eight years in the league for six teams. Played on the 1978 Final Four team as one of the famed "Triplets".
- Ronnie Brewer – son of Ron Brewer. First-round NBA draft choice of the Utah Jazz in 2006.
- Gordon Carpenter – gold medalist at 1948 Summer Olympics
- Shameka Christon – Plays for WNBA's New York Liberty.
- Todd Day – UA all-time leading scorer, All-American in 1992, played on the 1990 Final Four team, played for five NBA teams, most notably Milwaukee Bucks
- Marvin Delph – one of "The Triplets" was drafted but never played in the NBA choosing to play for Athletes in Action, a Christian ministry. Played on the 1978 Final Four team.
- Daniel Gafford - All-SEC Freshman and 2019 All-SEC First Team, current Center for the Dallas Mavericks .
- Scott Hastings – long-time NBA center
- Joe Johnson – drafted by the Boston Celtics 10th overall in 2001. Seven-time NBA All-Star, scored over 20,000 career points in his 18 seasons in the NBA, led Arkansas to the 2000 SEC Tournament championship.
- Joe Kleine – played 15 years in the NBA for the Chicago Bulls and five other teams. Was a gold medalist on the 1984 U.S. Olympic basketball team. Won an NBA championship with the Bulls.
- George Kok – dominant big man of the 1940s
- Lee Mayberry – All-American in 1992, played on the 1990 Final Four team, played seven years in the NBA for both the Milwaukee Bucks and Vancouver Grizzlies.
- Oliver Miller – played for six NBA teams, ending his career with the Minnesota Timberwolves in 2004.
- Sidney Moncrief – Two-time NBA Defensive Player of the Year and franchise great for the Milwaukee Bucks. Five-time NBA All-Star and an inductee to the Naismith Memorial Basketball Hall of Fame. One of the famed "Triplets", played on the 1978 Final Four team, 2× All-American, Arkansas #32 jersey retired.
- Jannero Pargo – long-time backcourt veteran in the NBA and current assistant coach for the Portland Trail Blazers.
- Bobby Portis - fiery big man for Milwaukee Bucks, first-round pick (#22 overall) of Chicago Bulls in 2015 NBA Draft. 1st team SEC in 2015, SEC Player of the Year.
- R. C. Pitts – gold medalist at 1948 Summer Olympics.
- Ike Poole – 1936 Consensus All-American
- Ulysses (U.S.) Reed – hit the half-court buzzer-beating shot to sink defending champion Louisville during the 1981 NCAA tournament.
- Kareem Reid – streetball legend and former player for the Harlem Globetrotters.
- Alvin Robertson – played for San Antonio Spurs. Was a gold medalist on the 1984 men's U.S. Olympic basketball team. Named NBA Defensive Player of the Year and Most Improved Player in 1986.
- Scotty Thurman – key to the 1994 NCAA Championship team and known as the player that hit "The Shot", a three-point basket with approximately 53 seconds left, in the 1994 Championship game versus Duke University.
- Darrell Walker – played for several NBA teams including the champion Chicago Bulls. Formerly head coach for Toronto Raptors and Washington Wizards.
- Sonny Weems – winner of the NCAA slam dunk competition and 2008 NBA draft pick (second round-39th overall) of the Chicago Bulls and then traded to the Denver Nuggets.
- Corliss Williamson aka "Big Nasty" – played for Sacramento Kings, Toronto Raptors, Detroit Pistons (with whom he won the NBA title in 2004), and Philadelphia 76ers. Returned to Sacramento in 2005. Named 2001–2002 NBA Sixth Man of the Year. He led the Hogs to 1994 NCAA Championship, where he was named Most Outstanding Player of the NCAA tournament. 2× All-SEC, 2× All-American, 2× SEC Player of the Year, Arkansas #34 jersey retired.
- Moses Moody- guard-forward for the Golden State Warriors.
- Anthony Black (basketball) point guard for the Orlando Magic.

=== Baseball ===
- Andrew Benintendi - seventh overall pick by Boston Red Sox in 2015 MLB Draft; 2015 Golden Spikes Award and Dick Howser Trophy winner. Member of 2018 World Series Championship Boston Red Sox team.
- Eric Hinske – 2002 American League Rookie of the Year, currently an Arizona Diamondback
- Dallas Keuchel – Currently plays for the Chicago White Sox, Four-time Gold Glove Award and 2015 American League Cy Young Award winner.
- Jeff King – played for the Pittsburgh Pirates and the Kansas City Royals
- Cliff Lee – played for the Texas Rangers and the Philadelphia Phillies, American League Cy Young Award winner and AL Comeback Player of the Year in 2008.
- Tim Lollar – won 47 Major League games pitching for 4 teams over 7 seasons
- Kevin McReynolds – played for New York Mets, Kansas City Royals, and San Diego Padres
- James McCann (baseball) - All-Star catcher currently playing for the New York Mets
- Mel McGaha – former Major League manager; also played in NBA
- Tom Pagnozzi – played for St. Louis Cardinals
- Robert Person – Pitcher for the New York Mets, Toronto Blue Jays, Philadelphia Phillies and Boston Red Sox
- Johnny Ray – 10 year Major League second baseman with Pittsburgh Pirates and Anaheim Angels
- Drew Smyly - Veteran Major League pitcher with stincts with the Detroit Tigers and the Tampa Bay Rays

=== Golf ===
- Miller Barber – top PGA Tour and Senior PGA Tour player
- Austin Cook – golfer
- John Daly – winner of two professional major championships
- Andrew Landry – Web.com Tour winner
- Stacy Lewis – NCAA individual champion, 2007. Won individual and team championship at 2006 World Student Games. Finished 3rd in 2008 Women's U.S. Open, her professional debut.
- David Lingmerth – Web.com Tour winner and PGA tour player
- Brenden Pappas – Nationwide Tour winner
- Deane Pappas – has won on Nationwide Tour and Sunshine Tour
- Tag Ridings – Nationwide Tour winner
- R. H. Sikes – won 1963 NCAA individual title, two PGA Tour events
- Stacy Lewis – LPGA Tour golfer, winner of two professional major championships

=== Track and field ===
- Niall Bruton – Two-time winner of NCAA indoor mile, Irish Olympian.
- Veronica Campbell-Brown – Won three gold medals and a bronze in two Olympic Games competing for Jamaica in sprints. Won 100 meter and second in 200 meter at 2007 World Championships.
- Mike Conley – Olympic silver medalist in 1984 and gold medalist in 1992 in the triple jump. Member of the USA Track and Field Hall of Fame
- Alistair Cragg – Top Irish distance runner.
- Calvin Davis – Won bronze medal in 400 meter hurdles at 1996 Summer Olympics.
- Joe Falcon – US's top miler in 1990.
- Edrick Floreal – Canadian Olympic triple jumper, head coach at Stanford.
- Tyson Gay – Won 100 and 200 meter sprints at 2007 World Championships.
- Matt Hemingway – Silver medalist in high jump in 2004 Olympic Games.
- Robert Howard – Two-time Olympic participant. Won nine NCAA titles in triple and long jumps.
- Deena Kastor – Holder of the US marathon record. Won bronze medal in Olympic marathon in 2004.
- Seneca Lassiter – Among top American milers, winning USATF 1500-meter run twice.
- Jarrion Lawson – 2016 winner of The Bowerman. First since Jesse Owens to sweep the 100, 200, and long jump in the same NCAA championship.
- Daniel Lincoln – US Olympian and American record holder in the steeplechase.
- Omar McLeod – Jamaican Olympic and World Champion in the 110mh.
- Frank O'Mara – Two-time 3000 meter indoor world champion.
- Gi-Gi Miller-Johnson – Top heptathlete in US in 2006.
- Brandon Rock – 800 meter runner; 1996 Summer Olympics, 1995 USATF National Champion, 1995 NCAA Outdoor Championship.
- Jérôme Romain – Top triple jumper who represented Dominica and France, winning the bronze medal at 1995 World Championships. Currently coaching at Brown University.
- Clyde Scott – Silver medalist in 110-meter hurdles at 1948 Olympic Games. Played in NFL.
- Wallace Spearmon, Jr. – 200 meter silver medalist at 2005 World Championships and bronze medalist at 2007 World Championships.
- Erick Walder – 10-time NCAA long jump and triple jump champion. Silver medalist in long jump at 1997 World Championships.
- Brian Wellman – World class triple jumper who represented Bermuda internationally, winning a silver medal at 1995 World Championships.
- Godfrey Siamusiye – Two-time Olympic distance runner and two-time NCAA Cross Country National Champion in 1995 and 1996.
- Graham Hood - Canadian Record holder, Olympian (1992, 1996)
- Yaseen Abdalla - NCAA Champion (2022), Sudanese record holder in the marathon, the indoor mile, and the 3000-meter and 5000-meter

=== Gymnastics ===
- Katherine Grable – 2014 NCAA Champion on Vault and Floor. Second in the All-Around at the NCAA Event Finals.
