= Pork chop (disambiguation) =

A pork chop is a cut of pig meat.

Pork chop may also refer to:

== People ==
- Porkchop Cash (born 1947), American professional wrestler
- Victoria "Porkchop" Parker (born 1970), American drag queen
- Pork Chop, a nickname of American football player Floyd Womack (born 1978)

== Other uses ==
- "The Pork Chop", an episode of RuPaul's Drag Race
- Pork Chop, a sports mascot of the University of Arkansas
- Porkchop, a character from the animated series Doug
- Pork chop bun, a popular snack in Macau
- The Pork Chop Gang, a group of north Florida legislators (1930s to 1960s)
- Porkchop plot, a type of graph used in astrodynamics
- Porkchop, another name for a traffic island as used in a roundabout
- "Pork Chop" is a nickname for officers of the Navy Supply Corps

== See also ==
- The Battle of Pork Chop Hill
- Pork Chop Hill (film), 1959
