= Arkansas Fight =

Fight song at the University of Arkansas

Song
- Written: 1913
- Genre: Fight song
- Composer: Henry D. Tovey
- Lyricist: William Edwin Douglass

The "University of Arkansas Fight Song", commonly abbreviated to "Arkansas Fight", is the primary fight song of the athletics teams of the University of Arkansas. The words and tune to the song were written in 1913 by William Edwin Douglass, a student at the time, and instrumentation and chords were added by Henry D. Tovey, his music professor. The song originated as the "Field Song" and, as can be interpreted from the lyrics, was intended as a football-exclusive song.

== Lyrics ==
The lyrics to "Arkansas Fight" are:

Hit that line! Hit that line!
Keep on going!
Move that ball right down the field! (Note: Alternately, "Take that ball right down the field!")
Give a cheer. Rah! Rah!
Never fear. Rah! Rah! (Note: Alternately, "Give a cheer. Go Hogs! Never Fear. Go Hogs!")
Arkansas will never yield!
On your toes, Razorbacks, to the finish,
Carry on with all your might!
For it's A-A-A-R-K-A-N-S-A-S for Arkansas! (Note: On occasion, the spelling of "Arkansas" will include the initial "A" repeated three times rather than just once (as in, "A-A-A-R-K-A-N-S-A-S"), in order to match the number of beats in the line.)
Fight, fight, fight!

== Other uses ==
The melody of the fight song, albeit with different words, is used by the athletic teams of Wright State University.

The #NeverYield campaign started in 2013 at Arkansas was derived from a line in the fight song: "Arkansas will never yield".
