= Tusk (mascot) =

Mascot for the University of Arkansas Razorbacks

- University: University of Arkansas
- Conference: SEC
- Description: Russian boar
- First seen: 1994
- Related mascot(s): Big Red, Sue E., Pork Chop, Boss Hog, Ribby

The original Tusk I feeding.

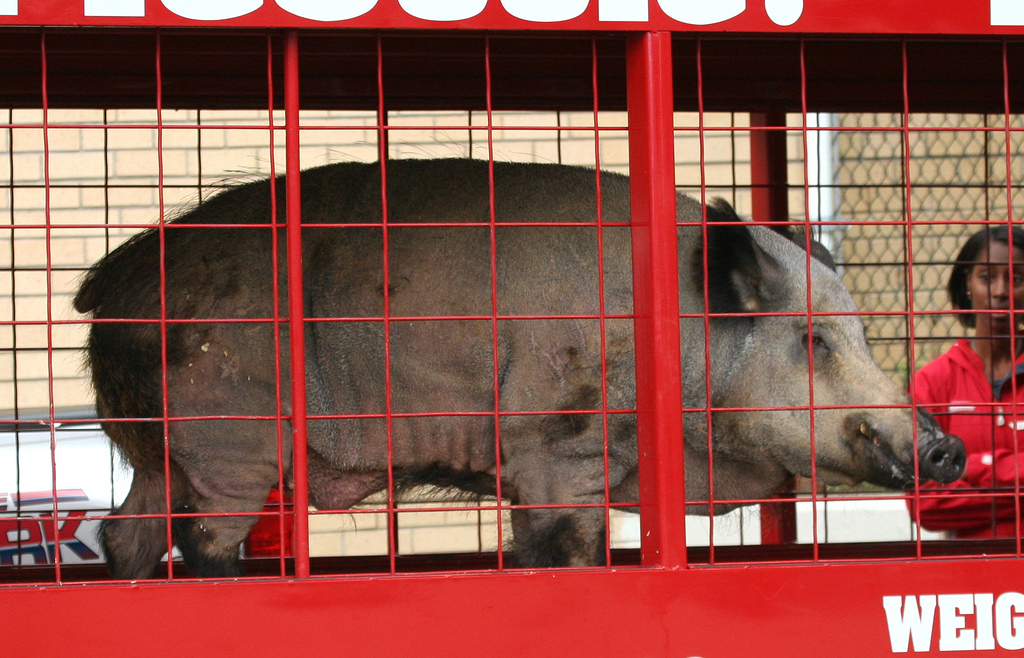
Tusk III

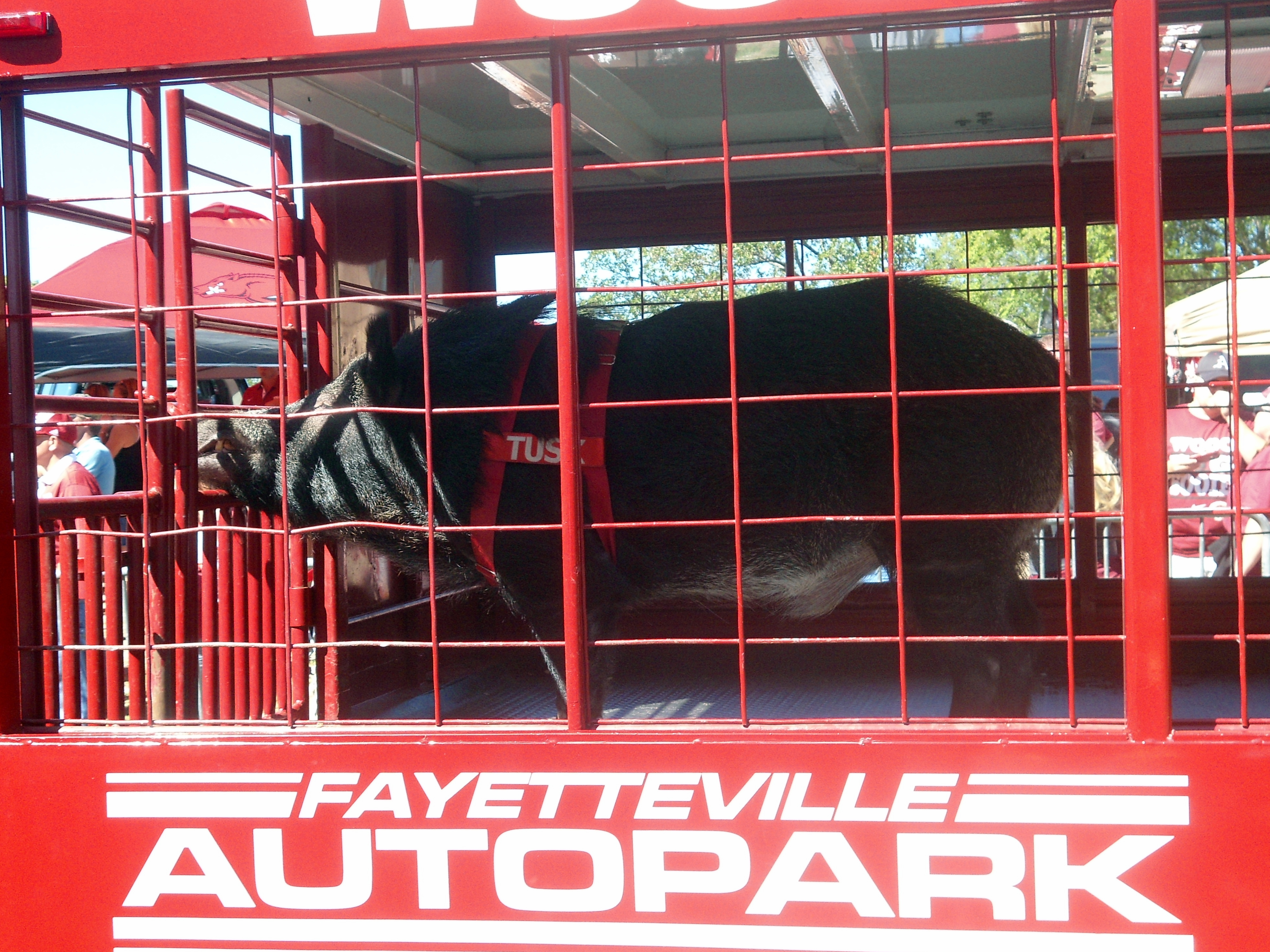
Tusk IV as a new mascot in September 2012.

Tusk is the name of the official live mascot for the University of Arkansas Razorbacks. The current live mascot is Tusk VI. All Tusks so far have been male (female swine do not have tusks) and from the same lineage.

Tusk travels to every home football game at Fayetteville or Little Rock, certain away football games such as the annual Southwest Classic game against Texas A&M in Dallas and some bowl games, occasional home basketball and baseball games, as well as other select events (such as pep rallies). Tusk is put into a spacious cardinal red holding pen which travels through the crowds, with the cheerleaders on the upper level, making him a crowd favorite. During the actual game, Tusk is moved into Donald W. Reynolds Razorback Stadium where he can be seen by the entire crowd. Tusk has been trained to give kisses to people who are brave enough to do so.

Tusk occupies a 9,000-square-foot (840 m^{2}) indoor facility and a 7,000-square-foot (650 m^{2}) fenced outdoor area just outside Dardanelle, Arkansas. He uses the indoor facility to escape the heat and sun, and the outdoor facility provides him the opportunity to slop in several mud holes. One of the first things that Tusk does each day is to go straight to his mud hole for a mud bath. Since Razorbacks are extremely muscular and have very little body fat, the mud keeps him cooler throughout the day and protects him from the sun and insects. Before any official functions he must attend, Tusk is given a shampoo and wash to make sure he looks his best for the public. In 2008, Razorback Athletics created the Tusk Fund to help provide financial assistance for the maintenance and upkeep of the live mascot program.

Tusk is one of several live animal mascots in the SEC, including Uga (Georgia Bulldogs), Mike the Tiger (LSU Tigers), Bully (Mississippi State Bulldogs), Sir Big Spur (South Carolina Gamecocks), Smokey (Tennessee Volunteers), Bevo (Texas Longhorns), and Reveille (Texas A&M Aggies), plus live animals as mascot-like symbols War Eagle (Auburn Tigers) and Boomer and Sooner (Oklahoma Sooners). There are only a few other live animal mascots in the United States.

== History and genealogy of Tusk namesake ==
All of the Russian boars bearing the name of Tusk so far have lived on a rural farm, just outside Dardanelle, Arkansas, and cared for by the Stokes family. All official Tusks so far have come from the same lineage. Tusks II and III were brothers and the offspring of Tusk I which were born August, 2002, to two separate female sows. They were both Russian boars, resembled wild razorback hogs, and weighed in at approximately 475 pounds (215 kg) each.

Tusk I (1997–2004) came about when Keith Stokes, then president of the Arkansas Pork Producers Association, was approached by local Razorback personality David Bazzel to find a wild hog to be the live mascot of the University of Arkansas in 1994. Stokes found a wild hog near Greenbrier, Arkansas, which became Tusk I and started the Tusk lineage beginning in 1997. Tusk I then served as the Razorback mascot for eight years, spending his first four football seasons at the Little Rock Zoo before being moved to the Tyson Foods Farm in Springdale, Arkansas, in 2001. Tusk I fathered Tusk II in 2002, and died in December 2004.

Tusk II (2004–2010) took over after the death of Tusk I in December 2004 and was known to sign autographs. An actual hoof print of Tusk II was taken and applied to an ink stamp that could be used on paper or T-shirts. Kids and Razorback fans could request the stamp where ever Tusk II made an appearance. Russian boars are extremely strong and surprisingly quick and fast for their size. Tusk II repeatedly jumped over a four-foot gate, at a weight of almost 500 pounds (230 kg).

Tusk III (2010–2011) took over upon the death of Tusk II who died on January 5, 2010. Tusk III was the brother of Tusk II (both sons of Tusk I), and took over for the 2010 football season as the interim live Razorback mascot because Tusk IV was still too young to do so.

Tusk IV (2011–2019) is the son of Tusk II and was born February 20, 2010. Tusk IV took over as the official live mascot beginning in the 2011 football season. He was described by his caretakers as the most docile and friendly-to-humans Tusk up to that point, largely as a result of being raised and handled frequently by humans since his birth. Tusk IV made news for such things as sending flowers to retiring Texas mascot Bevo upon a diagnosis of cancer. Tusk died on January 12, 2020.

Tusk V (2019–2022) was born April 19, 2018, and announced as the next in the line to take over from Tusk IV in May 2018. Tusk V took over during the 2019 football season, after his father, Tusk IV, retired. Tusk died on Sunday, January 15, 2023. Tusk V's final appearance at a sporting event was at the 2022 liberty bowl, which the Razorbacks won 55-53 in the third overtime. During his time in the mascot role, the Razorback Football team won two of their three bowl appearances, and the Razorback athletics program won numerous SEC championships. He was the mascot during the two most successful years in program history, with 18 various SEC championships.

Tusk VI (2022–present) is the brother of Tusk V, and son of Tusk IV. He succeeded Tusk V following his death in 2023.

Tusk VII (2026-) is the son of Tusk VI and the heir to the “Hog Throne.” He was born in Dardanelle, Arkansas, on September 17, 2025, at 2 lbs 8 oz and 12” long. Tusk VII will spend the remainder of 2025 and the 2026 offseason growing in preparation to succeed his father, Tusk VI.

== Previous University of Arkansas live mascots ==
In addition to the Tusk lineage, the live mascot tradition dates back to the 1960s and a number of hogs have represented the university through the years. In addition to their presence on the sidelines of sporting events, some have also gained a reputation for some of their activities off the field. The animal mascot was once called "Big Red", but that name is now used exclusively for the costumed human mascot Big Red.

There are several examples of previous animal mascot hijinks, to include an instance where Big Red III escaped from an animal exhibit near Eureka Springs in the summer of 1977 and ravaged the countryside before an irate farmer gunned him down. Ragnar was a wild hog captured in south Arkansas by Leola farmer Bill Robinson and Ragnar was also a reigning mascot that escaped to go on an animal killing spree before eventually dying of unknown causes in 1978. On his spree, he killed a coyote, a 450-pound (200 kg) domestic pig, and seven rattlesnakes.
