= Breathless (2012 film) =

- Directed by: Jesse Baget
- Written by: Jesse Baget; Stefania Moscato
- Produced by: Phillip B. Goldfine; Christine Holder; Mark Holder; Danny Roth
- Starring: Gina Gershon; Kelli Giddish; Wayne Duvall; Val Kilmer; Ray Liotta
- Cinematography: Bill Otto
- Edited by: Peter Basinski
- Music by: Jermaine Stegall
- Distributed by: Anchor Bay Entertainment
- Release date: August 14, 2012
- Running time: 92 minutes
- Country: United States
- Language: English

Breathless is a 2012 American comedy thriller starring Gina Gershon, Kelli Giddish, Wayne Duvall, Val Kilmer and Ray Liotta.

== Plot ==
In Texas in 1981, Lorna (Gina Gershon) invites her friend Tiny (Kelli Giddish) over to talk about the recent bank robbery at the Waldorf Savings & Loan in nearby Red County. Tiny arrives to find Lorna's husband Dale (Val Kilmer) unconscious on the living room floor, Lorna having whacked him over the head with a skillet, and Lorna tells her that she knows that he was the bank robber. Tiny explains that just because Dale used to rob convenience stores doesn't make him fit to be a bank robber, but Lorna insists. As evidence, she shows Tiny the red dirt on Dale's boots and explains that Red County is known as such because of its red soil, and that Dale has no business being in Red County. Furthermore, the robber was reportedly wearing a stocking over his head and escaped with $100,000, and Lorna's only pair of stockings are missing. Lorna contacting Dale's location of employment, where she is informed that Dale had requested a transfer, and she figures that it was to skip town and avoid suspicion.

Lorna and Tiny bind Dale before waking him up and confront him about the robbery, accusing him of being the thief. Initially, he denies knowing what she's talking about, exclaiming that while he admits to a checked past, now he "flies as straight as a duck with two good wings." Lorna brings out a revolver that she found hidden under the floorboards, but Dale claims to have never seen it before and know nothing about either it or the robbery. He maintains his innocence even after she shoots a warning shot, but as she becomes increasingly threatening with the gun, Dale admits to having robbed the bank. He proceeds to elaborate on how he was waiting for the right time to tell her about it and that he had delayed because he didn't want to burden her with the details of the finances because she's a woman. When she asks him where he stashed the loot, he responds that it's in a safe place and that she'll just have to let him go so he can show her where he hid it. Incredulous at his attempt to be freed, Lorna discerns from Dale's constant glancing off the side that, in fact, he hid the money in the trailer, while he denies it in a most unbelievable way. While they argue about how dumb it was to hide the stolen money in their home, Lorna is waving the gun around, and it accidentally goes off, shooting Dale through the head and killing him.

Both Lorna and Tiny are startled and nervous and begin to debate what to do next. Tiny starts dialing the police but Lorna convinces her that there will be no way to claim self defense when there's a man bound up in the middle of the room with a bullet in his head. Tiny tells Lorna that she could be in a lot of trouble, to which Lorna responds that Tiny is in just as much trouble because she was there while the murder was committed. Lorna recalls a story her father told her when she was young about some men who had experienced an industrial mishap and had gotten stuck under some mechanism in the oil fields and that by the second day, the Texas bug had not only killed them but made their bodies unidentifiable. They hatch a plan to bury Dale out in the oil fields where he can suffer the same fate.

Suddenly, they hear a vehicle approaching and it is the local sheriff (Ray Liotta). Lorna opens the door for the sheriff, who, aware of his past run-ins with the law, came to question Dale about the bank robbery. The sheriff sees Dale's station wagon parked by the side of the trailer and asks to come in, but Lorna denies the sheriff request on account of his lack of a warrant, explaining that Dale went for a walk, despite the intense heat. The sheriff walks back to his car, where we see him review his request for retirement form.

Tiny makes quick to get on with the plan, but Lorna explains that now that the sheriff is watching them, they can't very well leave the house carrying a dead body and bury him for the bugs to get to him. Tiny then suggests that they make a run for it, but Lorna explains that that'll just end with the police chasing them down, wherever they may be. Lorna remembers a recent Thanksgiving when she had to carve a 70 lb. turkey, and she takes out her electric carving knife and tells Tiny that her plan is to cut Dale up into tiny pieces in order to dispose of the body.

Lorna and Tiny get to work, dismembering Dale and using rust remover and a blender to destroy and liquify Dale's body, while Lorna mops the floor of blood and vacuums the trailer of remnants of Dale's organs. Getting rid of the body proves to be way more work than either woman bargained for, and so Lorna and Tiny try to burn it in the bathtub. By this time, the trailer is completely soiled with Dale's blood and it appears that there will be no way for them to avoid suspicion.

A man appears and breaks into the trailer through a back window and holds the two women at gunpoint. He is the private investigator that Lorna hired to track Dale, and he not only found out that Dale robbed the bank but also that he had been having an affair with Tiny. Now he's come to get his hands on the money, and he threatens the women to get to the cash. Lorna pretends to think about where the money might be hidden and tricks the private investigator into thinking that the cash might be stashed in the air duct between the walls. Knowing quite well that they had had a rat problem and that Dale had placed spring loaded rat traps in the ducts, Lorna gets the investigator to insert his arm into the air duct and feel around until he snaps a trap on his hand. While he's distracted by the pain, Tiny stabs him in the neck with a meat thermometer, and he dies. Tiny gets his gun and corners Lorna, figuring that Lorna now knew along that Dale had been cheating with her and had never intended to split the money with her. Lorna confirms this and gets Tiny to stand in a particular spot where she is able to bend down and literally pull the rug out from under her, knocking Tiny unconscious. Lorna retrieves the stolen money from a brown paper bag buried underneath her prize daisies in front of the trailer and makes off with the cash rolled up in her hair and covered by a kerchief, but not before cutting off her ring finger and leaving it on the floor with her ring as identification, making it seem like she had been killed as well and that the rest of her body had been similarly mutilated as Dale's had.

The sheriff finally shows up with his deputies and a search warrant and he kicks the door in to gain access when no one responds to his rapping on the door. When he enters, he sees Tiny on the floor near a gun and she begins to stir. After he shoots her dead, the deputies hear the gunfire and run in. The trailer is an absolute mess with blood and guts over every surface and the sheriff and the deputies remark about how gruesome it is and how they'll likely never be able to figure out what happened (this is rural Texas and prior to the advent of advanced crime scene investigation science).

The sheriff is then seen driving away and is met by Lorna, who it appears conspired with him to kill Dale and Tiny and make a getaway with the cash after he retires from the force and everyone else thinks Lorna died in the massacre in the trailer.

== Cast ==
- Gina Gershon as Lorna
- Kelli Giddish as Tiny
- Wayne Duvall as Maurice Doucette, P.I.
- Val Kilmer as Dale
- Ray Liotta as Sheriff Cooley
- Richard Riehle as Deputy Cole
