= Greater (film) =

2016 sports film by David Hunt

- Theatrical release poster
- Directed by: David Hunt
- Written by: David Hunt; Brian Reindl
- Produced by: Brian Reindl
- Starring: Neal McDonough; Leslie Easterbrook; Michael Parks; Nick Searcy
- Cinematography: Gabe Mayhan
- Edited by: David Hunt
- Music by: Stephen Endelman
- Production company: Greater Productions
- Distributed by: Hammond Entertainment
- Release date: August 26, 2016
- Running time: 130 minutes
- Country: United States
- Language: English
- Budget: $9 million
- Box office: $2 million

Greater is a 2016 American biographical sports film directed by David Hunt and starring Christopher Severio as American football player Brandon Burlsworth, a walk-on college player who became an All-American, dying in a car crash 11 days after being drafted high in the 3rd round to the National Football League. The film was released on August 26, 2016. It was the last film featuring Michael Parks to be released within his lifetime.

== Plot ==
The year is 1999 and Marty Burlsworth is awaiting the funeral of his 22-year-old brother, Brandon. While others, including Marty's mother, Barbara, have accepted the loss and put their faith in God, Marty can not do that as he does not understand why God would take away his brother on the cusp of his stardom in the NFL. That doubt is shared by an imaginary stranger, The Farmer, who does what he can to reinforce Marty's anger.

As preparations for the funeral begin, the story goes back to when Brandon was a 12-year-old with big dreams of playing for the University of Arkansas, and then his days playing high school football for Harrison High School football coach Tommy Tice. It is then that Marty and Brandon's long-estranged father, Leo, an alcoholic former musician, tries to get back into their and Barbara's lives. Marty does his best to protect his younger brother, due to being 17 years older than him and often mistaken for being his father.

When Brandon does not get a scholarship to become an Arkansas Razorback as an offensive guard, he is determined to join the team as a walk-on in 1994. Offensive line coach Mike Bender does not believe Brandon will make the team, due to Brandon not being large enough for a Division I-level college lineman. The sight of him is not lost on other players such as Nathan Ward, Anthony Lucas, nor Grant Garrett – the latter of whom is assigned as Brandon's roommate – and they make fun of him relentlessly.

But with hard work, Brandon sheds fat and puts on muscle, eventually proving himself on the field and turning around everyone's opinion of him. By his sophomore season, Arkansas head coach Danny Ford gives him a scholarship, and Brandon earns a starting position at right guard on the offensive line. Inspired by Brandon, the team achieves near greatness in his senior year of 1998, all by working and practicing hard. After the season is over, Brandon is named an All-American, and is then drafted in the 3rd round of the 1999 NFL draft by the Indianapolis Colts. After attending a workout session in Indianapolis, his position coach tells him that he foresees a great career ahead for him.

Eleven days after being drafted, Brandon is killed when he is hit head-on by a tractor trailer. His brother, Marty struggles with the unfairness of his brother's loss as the farmer continues to be the voice of doubt—challenging the love of a God who could allow this to happen. But as Marty leaves the stadium floor where the players have brought in flowers, his despair is obvious. He reaches the top of the stadium and turns to look at the mass of flowers the players brought to the field and sees a very definite statement of Brandon's message to everyone spelled out by the flowers: "We Trust". Marty returns to the scene of a joyful celebration of Brandon's life and message, clearly feeling a new measure of faith for his own life thanks to his brother.

== Production ==
Christopher Severio, an actor from Denham Springs, Louisiana, was cast in the lead role of Brandon Burlsworth. Severio had not followed football before taking the part. Football sequences were filmed at Razorback Stadium in Fayetteville, Arkansas, in May 2013.

== Cast ==
- Christopher Severio as Brandon Burlsworth
- Neal McDonough as Marty Burlsworth
- Leslie Easterbrook as Barbara Burlsworth
- Michael Parks as Leo Burlsworth
- Fredric Lehne as Coach Mike Bender
- Nick Searcy as The Farmer
- Wayne Duvall as Pastor Rick
- Quinton Aaron as Coach Aaron
- Patrick Duff as Howard Mudd
- Texas Battle as Anthony Lucas
- Grant Cook as Grant Garrett
- Josh Emerson as Nathan Ward
- Connor Antico as Clint Stoerner

== Release ==
In August 2016, shortly before the film's release, Severio's home was destroyed in the 2016 Louisiana floods. At the encouragement of producer Brian Reindl, he went ahead with a promotional trip to Charlotte, North Carolina, during which the University of Arkansas and the department store Belk donated clothing to him.

== Reception ==
On Rotten Tomatoes, the film has a review rating of 69%, based on 16 reviews. Some critics categorized the film as primarily a faith-based movie rather than a sports movie, with Nick Schager of Variety magazine describing it as: "An insistent, clunky sermon about triumph through faith, David Hunt's film is so determined to turn its subject into a Christ-like saint that it loses any sense of him as an actual flesh-and-blood man, the result being a third-string sports saga only apt to play to its devout target audience."

Marty Burlsworth, Brandon's older brother, praised Severio's portrayal of Brandon.
