= Brandon Burlsworth =

American football player (1976–1999)

No. 77
- Position: Guard

Personal information
- Born: September 20, 1976; Harrison, Arkansas, U.S.
- Died: April 28, 1999 (aged 22); Alpena, Arkansas, U.S.
- Listed height: 6 ft 4 in (1.93 m)
- Listed weight: 310 lb (141 kg)

Career information
- High school: Harrison (AR)
- College: Arkansas (1994–1998)
- NFL draft: 1999: 3rd round, 63rd overall pick

Career history
- Indianapolis Colts (1999)*
- * Offseason or practice squad member only

Awards and highlights
- First-team All-American (1998); First-team All-SEC (1998); Second-team All-SEC (1997); Arkansas Razorbacks No. 77 retired; Arkansas Sports Hall of Fame

Brandon Vaughn Burlsworth (September 20, 1976 – April 28, 1999) was an American football player who was an offensive lineman of the Arkansas Razorbacks football team from 1995 to 1998. He initially joined the team as a walk-on, eventually earning a scholarship and would later become an All-American.

Burlsworth would later be drafted by the Indianapolis Colts in the third round of the 1999 NFL draft, but would never play for them due to his death in a car accident just eleven days after being drafted.

== American football career ==
Burlsworth graduated in 1994 from Harrison High School, where he was an All-State selection, and volunteered as a walk-on football player to the University of Arkansas, despite having scholarship offers from smaller universities. After his 245-pound self was told by then-Razorbacks offensive line coach Mike Bender that linemen have to be over 300 pounds, he ate extensively and came back over the 300 lb mark in poor shape. Redshirting his first year (1994), he soon slimmed his unathletic 300 lb (140 kg) frame down to a stronger, leaner 260 lb (120 kg), and, over the next two years, built himself up to a bulky 300 lb (140 kg) offensive guard. By his sophomore season in 1996, he had earned a scholarship and a starting position at right guard on the offensive line.

Before his junior season in 1997, he was selected to be one of the team captains. Burlsworth's efforts earned him first-team All-SEC honors in 1997 and 1998, and he was selected for the 1998 College Football All-America Team. He was Arkansas's first All-American player since 1993 and their first player selected to a first-team squad since 1989. He was also named to the All-SEC Academic Honor Roll every year from 1995 to 1998. Burlsworth played on two SEC Western Division championship Razorback football teams (1995, 1998).

Burlsworth graduated in 1998 from the University of Arkansas with a B.A. in business administration. The following year, he completed an MBA. He was the first Razorback football player to complete a master's degree before playing in his final game, the 1999 Citrus Bowl.

After his career with the Razorbacks, Burlsworth was invited to the NFL combine. At the combine, Burlsworth topped all linemen with a 4.88 40-yard dash. He bench-pressed 225 pounds 28 times, weighed 308 pounds, and measured slightly below 6 feet 4 inches.

During the 1999 NFL draft, the Indianapolis Colts selected Burlsworth with the 63rd pick in the third round. After participating in a Colts post draft mini-camp, he impressed the team's then-offensive line coach Howard Mudd and was projected to be a starter for the Colts' 1999 season.

Burlsworth was elected to the Arkansas Sports Hall of Fame in 2002, and the University of Arkansas Letterman's Association Hall of Honor in 2004. In 2013, Bleacher Report named Burlsworth the #1 Greatest Walk-On player of the Bowl Championship Series (BCS) Era.

== Death ==
Eleven days after being drafted, Burlsworth was killed in a car accident near Alpena, Arkansas, on April 28, 1999, on his way back to his hometown of Harrison after a workout in Fayetteville. Burlsworth's vehicle clipped an oncoming 18-wheeler, swerved back into his lane, and then hit another tractor trailer head on. The stretch around Carrollton in which the crash occurred was not particularly rugged. A state police report said that, "for unknown reasons," Burlsworth's car drove left of the center line and hit the left front fender of a tractor trailer. After returning to its lane briefly, the car crossed the center line again and hit a second tractor trailer. Burlsworth was declared dead at the scene.

=== Tributes ===
- The Burlsworth Trophy is named after Brandon and was first awarded in 2010. This trophy is presented each year to college football's most outstanding player who began his career as a walk-on.
- Houston Nutt, Arkansas Razorback head football coach from 1998 through 2007, started the saying, "Do it the Burls Way", which means do it the right way even when no one is looking. This is the motto of the Brandon Burlsworth Foundation.
- Brandon's jersey #77 is retired at the University of Arkansas. It is the second retired football jersey in school history.
- His locker is enclosed in a glass case in the Razorback locker room.
- The Harrison Youth Center in Harrison, Arkansas, was renamed the Brandon Burlsworth Youth Center in May 1999.
- The Indianapolis Colts wore his initials, BB, on their helmets for the 1999 season.
- The Indianapolis Colts honored him by giving each of his family members, as well as the University of Arkansas Athletic Director a $5,000 (USD) check at halftime of the first Colts game after Brandon died in 1999.
- In 2016, a biographical sports film was made about Burlsworth entitled Greater.

== Brandon Burlsworth Foundation ==
After his death, family and friends established the Brandon Burlsworth Foundation in honor of his work ethic and Christian values. The Christian organization's mission is to support the physical and spiritual needs of children, in particular those children who have limited opportunities. The foundation's logo prominently features Burlsworth's signature black-framed glasses. The foundation makes its money via donations and the sale of Burlsworth merchandise. On the foundation's website, one can choose from books and movies about Brandon to shirts and hats to raise money for their cause.

=== Burls Kids ===
Today, through the Burls Kids program, the Burlsworth Foundation provides underprivileged youths with a chance to attend Razorback and Colts football games. Since 2000, the Foundation has bought 30 tickets to each Arkansas Razorbacks home football game. The tickets are distributed through Razorback Clubs across the state. The children are given an official "Burls Kid" T-shirt and replica glasses similar to those Brandon wore on the field.

=== Eyes of a Champion ===
In 2007, the Eyes of a Champion program was started. The Brandon Burlsworth Foundation, in partnership with Walmart/Sam's Optical Department and independent optometrists across Arkansas, provides eye care to thousands of pre-kindergarten through twelfth grade students. Primarily, these students come from working families who cannot afford extras like eye care and do not qualify for state funded programs. Applications must be submitted by school nurses or counselors and are available in English, French, and Spanish.

=== Football Camps ===
The Brandon Burlsworth Football Camps are for children going into third grade through ninth grade. They are held once each summer at F.S. Garrison Stadium in Harrison, Arkansas, and War Memorial Stadium in Little Rock, Arkansas. Children are given a chance to learn from former Razorbacks. Past participants include Anthony Lucas, Clint Stoerner, Joe Dean Davenport, Madre Hill, Grant Garrett, Russ Brown, Barry Lunney Jr., Chad Abernathy, Jeremiah Washburn, Michael Smith, Lucas Miller, and others. The campers learn football skills but, more importantly, they are taught throughout the day about character, attitude, morals, priorities, and the desire to do it "The Burls Way".

=== Scholarship and awards ===
Each year the Brandon Burlsworth Foundation gives out several awards and scholarships at various school levels. Eighteen students at the University of Arkansas who are primarily from smaller towns and who are characterized as academic overachievers receive $5,000 scholarships. Additionally, a Razorback football player who began his career as a walk-on but then earned a football scholarship is honored as the year's Burlsworth Athletic Scholar. The students are selected by the University of Arkansas Scholarship Committee and are recognized in a ceremony in Fayetteville, Arkansas.

High school awards include the Brandon Burlsworth High School Football Awards. Every high school football coach in Arkansas has the opportunity to nominate one player from his team. Those players receive a plaque and a copy of "Through the Eyes of A Champion, the Brandon Burlsworth Story," autographed by Brandon's mother, Barbara Burlsworth.

The Brandon Burlsworth Championship Award is presented at the Arkansas state football championship games to one player from each team for conduct above and beyond expectations. The Burlsworth Character Awards are a national award honoring character and sportsmanship in high school football. Awardees are announced in late spring following the fall football season.

The Brandon Burlsworth Award is given out yearly to one male and one female athlete at Harrison High School and the University of Arkansas who best exemplify the strength of character and work ethic known as "The Burls Way". In 2010, the Burlsworth Trophy was created and named in his honor. The award is given yearly to the most outstanding Division I FBS college football player who began his career as a walk-on.

== Biographies ==
=== Book ===
In 2001, the book Through the Eyes of a Champion: The Brandon Burlsworth Story, written by Jeff Kinley, was released. The book was praised for its authentic and inspirational portrayal of Brandon's story. The book contains a foreword by former University of Arkansas athletic director Frank Broyles and was the inspiration for a movie (see below). The book was re-released in August 2016 as a tie-in with the movie, renamed Greater: The Brandon Burlsworth Story.

=== Movie ===
A screenplay titled Greater: The Brandon Burlsworth Story was written based on the book. Brian Reindl, a former real estate investor and fellow University of Arkansas graduate, spent eight years working on the screenplay. A self-described "walk-on filmmaker", Reindl decided to finance and produce the film.

David Hunt, who also helped Brian write the screenplay, directed the movie, and Gabe Mayhan was director of photography. The score for the film was by Stephen Raynor-Endelman with Andrea Von Foerster as the music supervisor. The production designer was Lucio Seixas, and the costume designer was Keri Lee Doris. Morgan Casting Company was hired to cast the film and began holding open casting calls in March 2013 in Fayetteville, Arkansas; Little Rock, Arkansas; New Orleans, Louisiana; and Canton, Mississippi. The casting director was Stephanie Holbrook, C.S.A. The movie was produced by Brian Reindl with co-producer Tim Duff and executive producers Brian Reindl and Neal McDonough.

Filming began on Monday, May 6, 2013, in Fayetteville, Little Rock, and Farmington, Arkansas, with a six-week production shoot. Greater originally had a U.S. theatrical release date scheduled for January 2016, which was later moved to summer 2016, starring Neal McDonough, Leslie Easterbrook, Michael Parks, Nick Searcy, Quinton Aaron, M. C. Gainey, Fredric Lehne, Texas Battle, Wayne Duvall, and Christopher Severio as Brandon, as well as cameos by author Jeff Kinley and Brandon's brother, Marty Burlsworth.

On January 16, 2016, the Pro Football Hall of Fame in Canton, Ohio, hosted an exclusive screening of Greater. John Randle and Aeneas Williams, both members of the Pro Football Hall of Fame, participated in an interactive roundtable discussion following the screening.

The movie was originally scheduled for a release date of January 29, 2016. However, on January 21, 2016, Hammond Entertainment, LLC announced that the release of Greater would be moved to summer 2016. The press release stated that the change was due to "[o]verwhelming positive response from screening audiences and the desire of a national theater chain to show it in more locations".

The official general release date of August 26, 2016, was announced on Tuesday, August 16, 2016, via the movie's website and official Twitter account. Northwest Arkansas television station Fox 24 (KFTA) ran a story with details about an advance screening which was held on Tuesday, August 23, 2016, at Malco Razorback 16 theater in Fayetteville, Arkansas, with a question and answer session after the movie.

== See also ==
- List of gridiron football players who died during their careers
