= Harrison High School (Arkansas) =

Location
- 925 Goblin Dr; Harrison, Arkansas; United States; 36°14′22″N 93°08′00″W

Information
- School district: Harrison School District
- CEEB code: 041025
- Teaching staff: 129.84 (FTE)
- Grades: 9–12
- Enrollment: 841 (2023-2024)
- Student to teacher ratio: 6.48
- Colors: Blue and gold
- Team name: Golden Goblins
- Website: www.harrisongoblins.com
- Harrison High School
- U.S. National Register of Historic Places
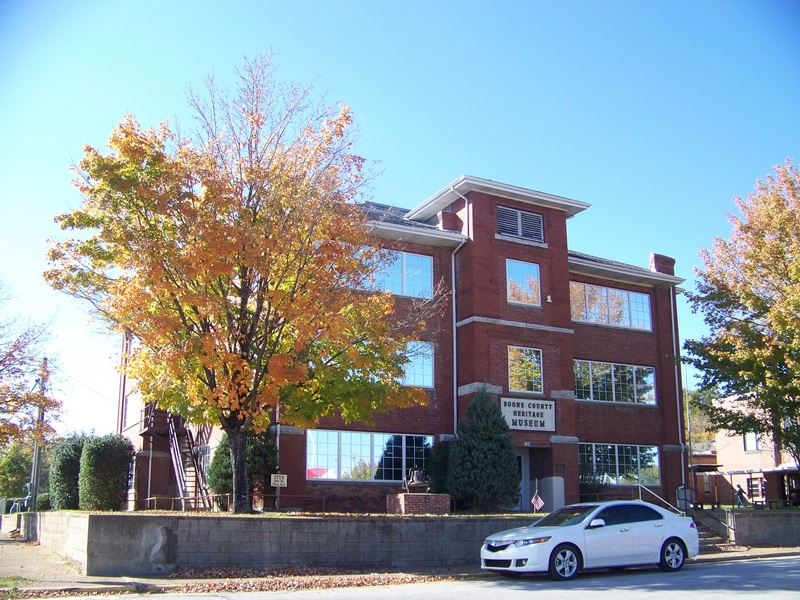
- The former high school building, now a museum

- Location within Arkansas Location within the United States
- Location: 124 S. Cherry St., Harrison, Arkansas
- Coordinates: 36°13′30″N 93°6′38″W
- Area: Less than one acre
- Built: August 17, 1912
- Architect: Harry C. Schwebke, R.D. Pollard
- Architectural style: Prairie School, International Style
- NRHP reference No.: 06001284
- Added to NRHP: January 24, 2007

The Harrison High School is a public high school serving ninth through twelve grade students in Harrison, Arkansas, United States.

The Old Harrison High School was built in 1912 and listed on the National Register of Historic Places in 2007. It was designed by architects Harry C. Schwebke and R.D. Pollard in Prairie School and International Style architecture. The building served as the high school until 1952 before becoming the junior high through 1987. Soon thereafter, the site continues to serve the community as the Boone County Heritage Museum operated by the Boone County Historical and Railroad Society.

== Academics ==
Harrison High School provides a comprehensive education for students in grades nine through twelve, which is accredited by AdvancED and the Arkansas Department of Education (ADE). Students are engaged in regular and Advanced Placement (AP) coursework and exams prior to graduation.

== Extracurricular activities ==
The Harrison High School mascot is the Golden Goblin with blue and gold as its school colors. The Harrison Golden Goblins participate in interscholastic activities In the 5A West Conference under the administration of the Arkansas Activities Association. The Golden Goblins sport teams include baseball, basketball (boys/girls), cheerleading, cross country (boys/girls), debate, football, golf (boys/girls), soccer (boys/girls), softball, speech, tennis (boys/girls), track (boys/girls), and volleyball.

- Cross country: The girls cross country team is one of the state's most successful with nine state championships between 1993 and 2003, including a state record eight consecutive titles (1993–2000).
- Basketball: The girls basketball team captured three consecutive state championships in 2000, 2001, and 2002.
- Baseball: The baseball team won its first state baseball championship in 2008, with head coach Kirk Bock being awarded the District 6 Baseball Coach of the Year by the National High School Baseball Coaches of America.
- Soccer: As of the 2012 season, the boys soccer team is the state's only boys team with six state soccer championships winning 5A classification titles in spring 2002–2006 and 2008. The girls team are 3-time state champions with 5A titles in 2002, 2004 and 2011. Harrison boasts the 2010 NSCAA Arkansas Girls High School Player of the Year award winner.
- Football: Harrison has one state championship in football from the 1999 season, with Tommy Tice as head coach. Former Goblin and Arkansas Razorback All-American Brandon Burlsworth had been killed in a car accident earlier that year after being drafted by the Indianapolis Colts, and the 1999 season was dedicated in his honor.

== Notable alumni ==
- Brandon Burlsworth - Offensive Lineman for the University of Arkansas. Drafted by the Indianapolis Colts with the 63rd pick in the 1999 NFL draft, and killed in an automobile accident near Alpena in April 1999. The Burlsworth Trophy, given to the best football player in the nation who began their college career as a walk-on, is named in his honor.
- Ida Hayman Callery - Teacher, feminist, socialist organizer, and suffragist in Arkansas prior to World War I. Callery traveled extensively in Arkansas, Oklahoma, and Kansas as an organizer for the Socialist Party. Her leadership saw the Socialist Party in Arkansas reach its peak in 1914 when it claimed more than 2,000 members.
- F. Sheridan Garrison - Business Leader, founder of Arkansas Freightways, which became American Freightways and then was acquired by FedEx, becoming FedEx Freight. A Harrison native, Garrison followed his time at HHS by becoming an honors graduate of the University of Arkansas College of Business (now called the Sam M. Walton College of Business.
- John Paul Hammerschmidt - Republican Congressman representing Harrison and northwest Arkansas for 26 years. Hammerschmidt was a Harrison native who grew up on a family farm on Crooked Creek. His record of public service includes distinguished service in the Army Air Corps during World War II. Before seeking public office Hammerschmidt was a lumberman, builder and building supplies businessman. In Congress, Hammerschmidt was the author and initiating sponsor of legislation that added the Buffalo National River to the National Park Service in 1972. He was also the original sponsor of congressional authorization for a Vietnam Veterans Memorial in Washington, D.C.
- C.D. Wright - award-winning poet. Wright's poetry is notable for its experimental variety and rich colloquial sound. She was a National Book Award finalist for her 2010 volume One With Others: [a little book of her days], which won the National Book Critics Circle Award for Poetry that year.
