= Wayne Duvall =

American actor (born 1958)

Wayne Dwyer Duvall (born May 29, 1958) is an American actor known for appearing as Homer Stokes in O Brother, Where Art Thou?, as well recurring roles as the television series Billions, The District, The Leftovers, BrainDead, The Righteous Gemstones.

He has also appeared in films including Apollo 13, Leatherheads, Duplicity, Lincoln, American Animals, Richard Jewell, The Hunt, and The Trial of the Chicago 7, as well as in Broadway theatre productions, most notably the original New York run of 1984.

He was born in Silver Spring, Maryland to Robert Andrew Duvall (1926–1971) and Mary Alida Carlson (1925–1997) and is a second cousin of actor Robert Duvall.

== Filmography ==
=== Film ===
Year	Title	Role	Notes
1991	Final Approach	Doug Slessinger	
1992	Dark Vengeance	Veros	
1993	Falling Down	Paramedic	
1994	Disclosure	Executive #1	
1995	Unstrung Heroes	Mr. Crispi	
1995	Apollo 13	LEM Controller White	
1995	Baja	Husband	
1996	Two Guys Talkin' About Girls	Tow Truck Driver	
1996	The Fan	Detective Baker	
1996	My Fellow Americans	Chet	
1998	Hard Rain	Hank	
1999	The Deep End of the Ocean	McGuire	
1999	Suckers	Randall	
1999	The Last Marshal	Vanmeter	
1999	A Little Inside	Coach Steve	
2000	Tripfall	Alex	
2000	O Brother, Where Art Thou?	Homer Stokes	
2000	A Better Way to Die	Rifkin	
2001	Evolution	Dr. Paulson	
2002	Love Liza	Gas Station Employee	
2002	Emmett's Mark	Richard Wilkes	
2007	In the Valley of Elah	Detective Nugent	
2008	Leatherheads	Coach Ferguson	
2008	Pride and Glory	Bill Avery	
2009	Duplicity	Ned Guston	
2009	Star Crossed	Dr. Lawrence	
2010	Edge of Darkness	Chief of Police	
2010	13	Mr. Taylor	
2010	The Mulberry Tree	Benny	
2012	Breathless	Maurice Doucette	
2012	Lincoln	Benjamin Wade	
2013	West End	Fat Patty O'Hara	
2013	Prisoners	Captain Richard O'Malley	
2014	Hello, My Name Is Frank	Preacher	
2015	Home Run Showdown	Simpson	
2016	Wolves	Coach Ray	
2016	Greater	Pastor Rick	
2018	American Animals	Bill Welton	
2019	The Kitchen	Larry	
2019	Richard Jewell	Richard Rackleff	
2020	The Hunt	Don	
2020	The Trial of the Chicago 7	Detective Deluca	
2021	Werewolves Within	Sam Parker	
2021	A Quiet Place Part II	Roger	Uncredited

=== Television ===
Year	Title	Role	Notes
1991	Matlock	Desk Clerk	Episode: "The Man of the Year"
1991	Stat	Paramedic #1	Episode: "Psychosomatic"
1991	MacGyver	Victor Nesbitt	Episode: "The 'Hood"
1992	L.A. Law	Chris Flanagan	Episode: "Diet, Diet My Darling"
1992	Picket Fences	FBI Agent #2	Episode: "The Green Bay Chopper"
1992	Willing to Kill: The Texas Cheerleader Story	Principal	Television film
1993	Getting By	Agent Branigan	Episode: "Letter to the President"
1993	The X-Files	Agent Jerry Lamana	Episode: "Ghost in the Machine"
1994	Moment of Truth: Cradle of Conspiracy	Officer Banks	Television film
1995	ER	Umpire	Episode: "Love Among the Ruins"
1995	Murder One	Police Officer	Episode: "Chapter Eight"
1995, 2005	JAG	Mayor Wayne Hazlett / Hobbs	2 episodes
1996	Diagnosis: Murder	Mr. Nolan	Episode: "Murder in the Dark"
1997	Skeletons	Irish Sergeant	Television film
1997	Sabrina the Teenage Witch	Linus J. Skeezics	Episode: "The Great Mistake"
1998	Timecop	First Mate Lewis	Episode: "Lost Voyage"
1998	Seven Days	Major Nick Tobias	Episode: "Doppleganger: Part 1"
1999	Nash Bridges	Ferry	Episode: "Shoot the Moon"
1999	Chicago Hope	Kyle Corwin	Episode: "Home Is Where the Heartache Is"
1999	Profiler	Eric Stanley	Episode: "Blind Eye"
2000	Judging Amy	Officer Todd	Episode: "Blast from the Past"
2000	Normal, Ohio	Male Fan	Episode: "A Thanksgiving Episode"
2000–2004	The District	Sgt. Phil Brander	43 episodes
2003	NYPD Blue	Dan Burleigh	Episode: "Porn Free"
2004	The West Wing	Bill Parsons	Episode: "Talking Points"
2004	CSI: Crime Scene Investigation	Walter Beerly	Episode: "What's Eating Gilbert Grissom?"
2004–2010	Law & Order	Various roles	4 episodes
2005	Law & Order: Criminal Intent	Kurt Plumm	Episode: "Stress Position"
2005	Their Eyes Were Watching God	Doctor Gordon	Television film
2005	CSI: NY	John Grimes	Episode: "Trapped"
2006	Strong Medicine	Dixon	Episode: "Dr. Thornton Hears a Who?"
2006	Threshold	Restaurant Owner	Episode: "Alienville"
2007	Law & Order: SVU	Seth Milsted	Episode: "Loophole"
2007	K-Ville	Terrence Deville	Episode: "Cobb's Webb"
2007	Avatar: The Last Airbender	Warden Poon (voice)	3 episodes
2011	Hawaii Five-0	Donald Rutherford	Episode: "Ma Ke Kahakai"
2011	Boardwalk Empire	Edward I. Edwards	Episode: "A Dangerous Maid"
2011	The Good Wife	Detective Harcourt	2 episodes
2012	Person of Interest	Councilman Seth Larsson	Episode: "Firewall"
2012	White Collar	Myrick	Episode: "Ancient History"
2013	Elementary	Duke Landers	Episode: "Dead Man's Switch"
2013	Hell on Wheels	Senator Metcalf	3 episodes
2014	The Leftovers	Det. Louis Vitello	4 episodes
2014	Gotham	Morry Quillan	Episode: "Selina Kyle"
2015	Madam Secretary	FBI Director Neil Hendricks	2 episodes
2015	Fargo	Captain Jeb Cheney	Episode: "The Castle"
2016	BrainDead	Andre Amarant	4 episodes
2017	Sneaky Pete	Charles McGregor	Episode: "Safe"
2018	Suits	Pat McGahan	Episode: "Good-Bye"
2018	One Dollar	Benjamin Walsh	4 episodes
2018	The Finest	Commissioner Callahan	Television film
2019	The Code	Hermes Papademotropoulos	3 episodes
2019	Pearson	Pat McGann	8 episodes
2021	Evil	Louie Wolff	Episode: "C Is for Cop"
2022	The Righteous Gemstones	Glendon Marsh	3 episodes
2022	Billions	Bud Lazzara	6 episodes

=== Video games ===
Year	Title	Role	Notes
2001	Ghost Recon	Additional Voices	Xbox version
2002	Tom Clancy's Ghost Recon: Island Thunder	Additional Voices	Credited as Wayne Duval
2006	Hitman: Blood Money	Joe Netberg, Southern Guards, Wedding Guards	
2012	Max Payne 3	Anders Detling	Motion capture and voice
2018	Red Dead Redemption 2	The Local Pedestrian Population	

=== Theatre ===
Year	Title	Role	Venue	Notes
2022–2024	Swept Away	Captain	Berkeley Repertory Theatre	Regional
2022–2024	Swept Away	Captain	Arena Stage	Regional
2022–2024	Swept Away	Captain	Longacre Theatre	Broadway
