= Big Red (University of Arkansas) =

College mascot

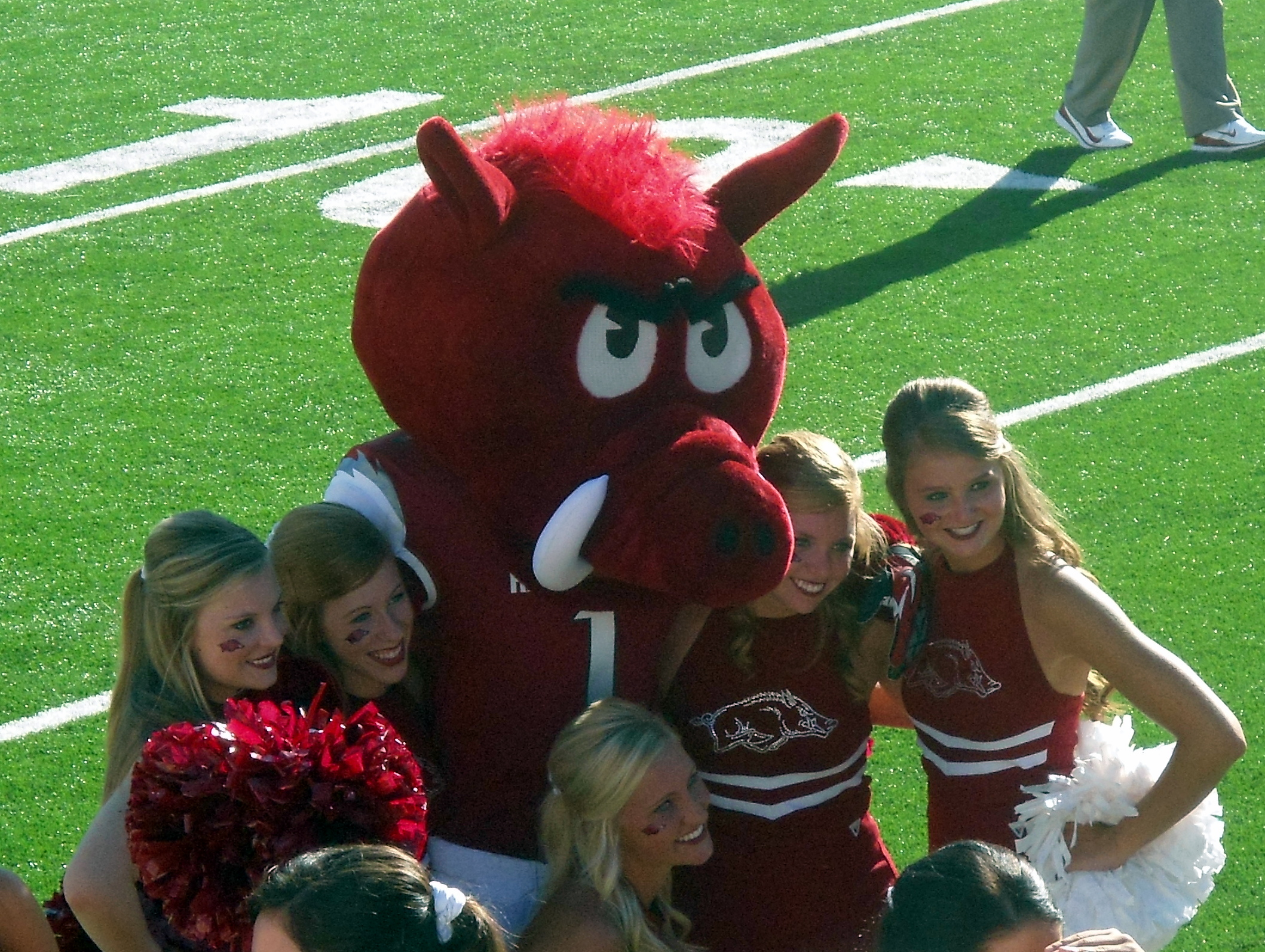
- Big Red poses with Razorback cheerleaders, 2012
- University: University of Arkansas
- Conference: SEC
- Description: Anthropomorphic razorback hog
- First seen: 1964 (live mascot), 1973 (costumed)
- Related mascot(s): Tusk, Sue E., Pork Chop, Boss Hog, Ribby

Big Red is the main costumed mascot of the University of Arkansas in Fayetteville, Arkansas. Since 1910, the mascot is modeled after the wild razorback hog. In 1964, he was named Big Red.

== History ==
In the early twentieth century, wild razorback hogs were a common sight in rural Arkansas. After the team's fifth straight victory, over LSU in Memphis, to open the 1909 football season, coach Hugo Bezdek told a group of fans at the train station upon their return that the team played "like a wild band of razorback hogs." The name stuck, and "Razorbacks" replaced "Cardinals" (still the school color) as the school's nickname. Since the 1960s, live mascots have been kept, the current one being Tusk, a Russian boar which resembles the old razorback hogs; previously, the live mascots were also called "Big Red".

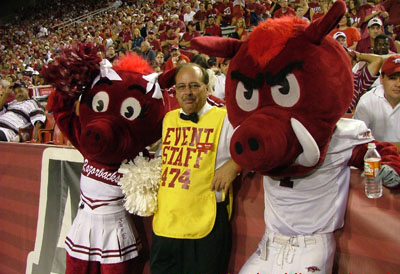
Big Red and Sue E. during a Razorback football game.

There are currently five costumed mascots serving the University of Arkansas Razorbacks. "Big Red" is the original mascot, also nicknamed "the Fighting Razorback." Big Red made his debut during the early 1970s and was also commonly referred to as "the Dancing Razorback" throughout the 1980s. A female Razorback mascot, "Sue E. Pig," performs at all women's events, and is known for her dancing skills and costume changes. There is a child-sized mascot named "Pork Chop," popular with younger fans. Pork Chop has appeared at Razorback games since at least 1998. Since 1999, "Boss Hog" (named for the character from "The Dukes of Hazzard") has served as a 9-foot-tall (2.7 m) inflatable mascot. There is also a baseball-specific razorback mascot named Ribby (a play on the baseball abbreviation "RBI") that attends every Arkansas home baseball game.
