= Crawford Township, Kansas =

Crawford Township, Kansas may refer to:

- Crawford Township, Cherokee County, Kansas
- Crawford Township, Crawford County, Kansas

== See also ==
- List of Kansas townships
- Crawford Township (disambiguation)
