= Wyola, Arkansas =

- Unincorporated community
- Wyola's position in Arkansas. Wyola, Arkansas (the United States)
- Coordinates: 35°52′44″N 94°02′50″W
- Country: United States
- State: Arkansas
- County: Washington
- Township: Crawford
- Elevation: 1,483 ft (452 m)
- Time zone: UTC-6 (Central (CST))
  - Summer (DST): UTC-5 (CDT)
- Area code: 479
- GNIS feature ID: 57241

Wyola, Arkansas is an unincorporated community in Crawford Township, Washington County, Arkansas, United States. It is located on Arkansas Highway 74, south of Arnett and east of Brentwood.
