= Crawford Township, Arkansas =

Crawford Township, Arkansas may refer to:

- Crawford Township, Washington County, Arkansas
- Crawford Township, Yell County, Arkansas

== See also ==
- List of townships in Arkansas
- Crawford Township (disambiguation)
