= Arnett, Texas =

Arnett, Texas may refer to:

- Arnett, Coryell County, Texas
- Arnett, Hockley County, Texas

== See also ==
- Arnett
