= Crawford Township =

Crawford Township may refer to the following places in the United States:

Arkansas

- Crawford Township, Washington County, Arkansas
- Crawford Township, Yell County, Arkansas, in Yell County, Arkansas

Iowa

- Crawford Township, Madison County, Iowa
- Crawford Township, Washington County, Iowa

Kansas

- Crawford Township, Cherokee County, Kansas
- Crawford Township, Crawford County, Kansas

Missouri

- Crawford Township, Buchanan County, Missouri
- Crawford Township, Osage County, Missouri

Nebraska

- Crawford Township, Antelope County, Nebraska

North Carolina

- Crawford Township, Currituck County, North Carolina, in Currituck County, North Carolina

North Dakota

- Crawford Township, Slope County, North Dakota, in Slope County, North Dakota

Ohio

- Crawford Township, Coshocton County, Ohio
- Crawford Township, Wyandot County, Ohio

Pennsylvania

- Crawford Township, Clinton County, Pennsylvania
