= Blue Springs Village, Arkansas =

- Unincorporated community
- Blue Springs Village' position in Arkansas. Blue Springs Village, Arkansas (the United States)
- Coordinates: 36°10′30″N 94°00′56″W
- Country: United States
- State: Arkansas
- County: Washington
- Township: Boston
- Elevation: 1,171 ft (357 m)
- Time zone: UTC-6 (Central (CST))
  - Summer (DST): UTC-5 (CDT)
- Area code: 479
- GNIS feature ID: 65293

Blue Springs Village is an unincorporated community in Brush Creek Township in northeastern Washington County, Arkansas, United States. The community is located east of Springdale, just north of U.S. Route 412 on the west bank of Beaver Lake.
