= Blewford, Arkansas =

- Ghost Town
- Blewford' historical position in Arkansas.
- Coordinates: 36°10′8″N 94°19′53″W
- Country: United States
- State: Arkansas
- County: Washington
- Township: Harmon
- Elevation: 1,198 ft (365 m)
- Time zone: UTC-6 (Central (CST))
  - Summer (DST): UTC-5 (CDT)
- ZIP code: 72704
- Area code: 479
- GNIS feature ID: 65290

Blewford was a community in Harmon Township, Washington County, Arkansas, United States. It is located within the Ozark National Forest approximately one quarter mile east of Litteral Road and the Benton County line. US Route 412 is approximately one mile to the north.

A post office existed from approximately 1899 to 1902.
