= Banyard, Arkansas =

- Unincorporated community
- Banyard's position in Arkansas. Banyard, Arkansas (the United States)
- Coordinates: 35°45′36″N 94°12′25″W
- Country: United States
- State: Arkansas
- County: Washington
- Township: Winslow
- Elevation: 1,982 ft (604 m)
- Time zone: UTC-6 (Central (CST))
  - Summer (DST): UTC-5 (CDT)
- ZIP code: 72701
- Area code: 479
- GNIS feature ID: 72959

Banyard is an unincorporated community in Winslow Township, Washington County, Arkansas, United States. It is located on Bunyard Road near the Crawford County line west of the Bobby Hopper Tunnel.
