= Prairie Township, Washington County, Arkansas =

Township of Prairie
- Township
- Location of Prairie Township in Washington County

- Location of Washington County in Arkansas
- Coordinates: 36°5′10″N 94°8′16″W
- Country: United States
- State: Arkansas
- County: Washington
- Established: 1829

Area
  - Total: 29.8 sq mi (77 km^{2})
  - Land: 29.7 sq mi (77 km^{2})
  - Water: 0.1 sq mi (0.26 km^{2})
- Elevation: 1,335 ft (407 m)

Population (2000)
  - Total: 3,526
  - Density: 119/sq mi (46/km^{2})
- Time zone: UTC-6 (CST)
  - Summer (DST): UTC-5 (CDT)
- Area code: 479
- GNIS feature ID: 69797

Prairie Township is one of 37 townships in Washington County, Arkansas, United States. As of the 2000 census, its total population was 3,526.

== Geography ==
According to the United States Census Bureau, Morrow Township covers an area of 29.8 square miles (77 km^{2}), with 29.7 miles (47.8 km) being land and the remaining 0.1 miles (0.16 km) being water. The township has been fragmented by the expansion of Fayetteville and thus Fayetteville Township. Prairie now consists of two main segments along Fayetteville's eastern edge and three very small segments on Fayetteville's west side.

The township gave part to Reed Township in 1880 and part to Wyman Township between 1890 and 1900.

=== Cities, towns, villages ===
- Habberton

=== Cemeteries ===
The township contains Hester Cemetery and St. Joseph Cemetery.

=== Major routes ===
- Arkansas Highway 45
