= Pitkin Corner, Arkansas =

- Unincorporated community
- Pitkin Corner's position in Arkansas. Pitkin Corner, Arkansas (the United States)
- Coordinates: 35°53′7.3″N 94°10′29.7″W
- Country: United States
- State: Arkansas
- County: Washington
- Township: West Fork
- Elevation: 1,404 ft (428 m)
- Time zone: UTC-6 (Central (CST))
  - Summer (DST): UTC-5 (CDT)
- Area code: 479
- GNIS feature ID: 78023

Pitkin Corner (formerly Pitkin) is an unincorporated community in West Fork Township, Washington County, Arkansas, United States. It is located on Washington County Road 35 west of the Woolsey Bridge.

A variant name was "Pitkin". A post office called Pitkin was established in 1884, and remained in operation until 1928.
