= Sunset, Washington County, Arkansas =

Sunset, Arkansas
- Unincorporated community
- Sunset's position in Arkansas. Sunset, Arkansas (the United States)
- Coordinates: 35°48′37.3″N 94°00′47.7″W
- Country: United States
- State: Arkansas
- County: Washington
- Township: Reed
- Elevation: 2,277 ft (694 m)
- Time zone: UTC-6 (Central (CST))
  - Summer (DST): UTC-5 (CDT)
- ZIP code: 72959
- Area code: 479
- GNIS feature ID: 78505

Sunset (formerly Sun Set) is an unincorporated community in Reed Township, Washington County, Arkansas, United States. It is located at the intersection of Sunset Road (Washington County Road 38 [CR 38]) and CR 110.

== History ==
A post office was established at Summers in 1888, and remained in operation until 1951.
