= Suttle, Arkansas =

- Unincorporated community
- Suttle's position in Arkansas. Suttle, Arkansas (the United States)
- Coordinates: 35°58′34.3″N 94°23′53.8″W
- Country: United States
- State: Arkansas
- County: Washington
- Township: Starr Hill
- Elevation: 1,417 ft (432 m)
- Time zone: UTC-6 (Central (CST))
  - Summer (DST): UTC-5 (CDT)
- ZIP code: 72744
- Area code: 479
- GNIS feature ID: 58718

Suttle is an unincorporated community in Starr Hill Township, in western Washington County, Arkansas, United States. It is located on Washington County Road 33 and on the east bank of Moores Creek. Lincoln lies about two miles to the southwest.
