= Arnett =

Arnett may refer to the following places in the United States:

- Arnett, Arkansas, an unincorporated community
- Arnett, Kentucky, an unincorporated community
- Arnett, Missouri, an unincorporated community
- Arnett, Oklahoma, a town
- Arnett, Harmon County, Oklahoma, an unincorporated community
- Arnett, Raleigh County, West Virginia, an unincorporated community
