= List of lakes of Washington County, Arkansas =

There are at least 22 named / registered lakes and reservoirs in Washington County, Arkansas, United States.

== Lakes ==
- Lake Wilson, 35°59′54″N 094°08′06″W, el. 1,306 feet (398 m)

== Reservoirs ==
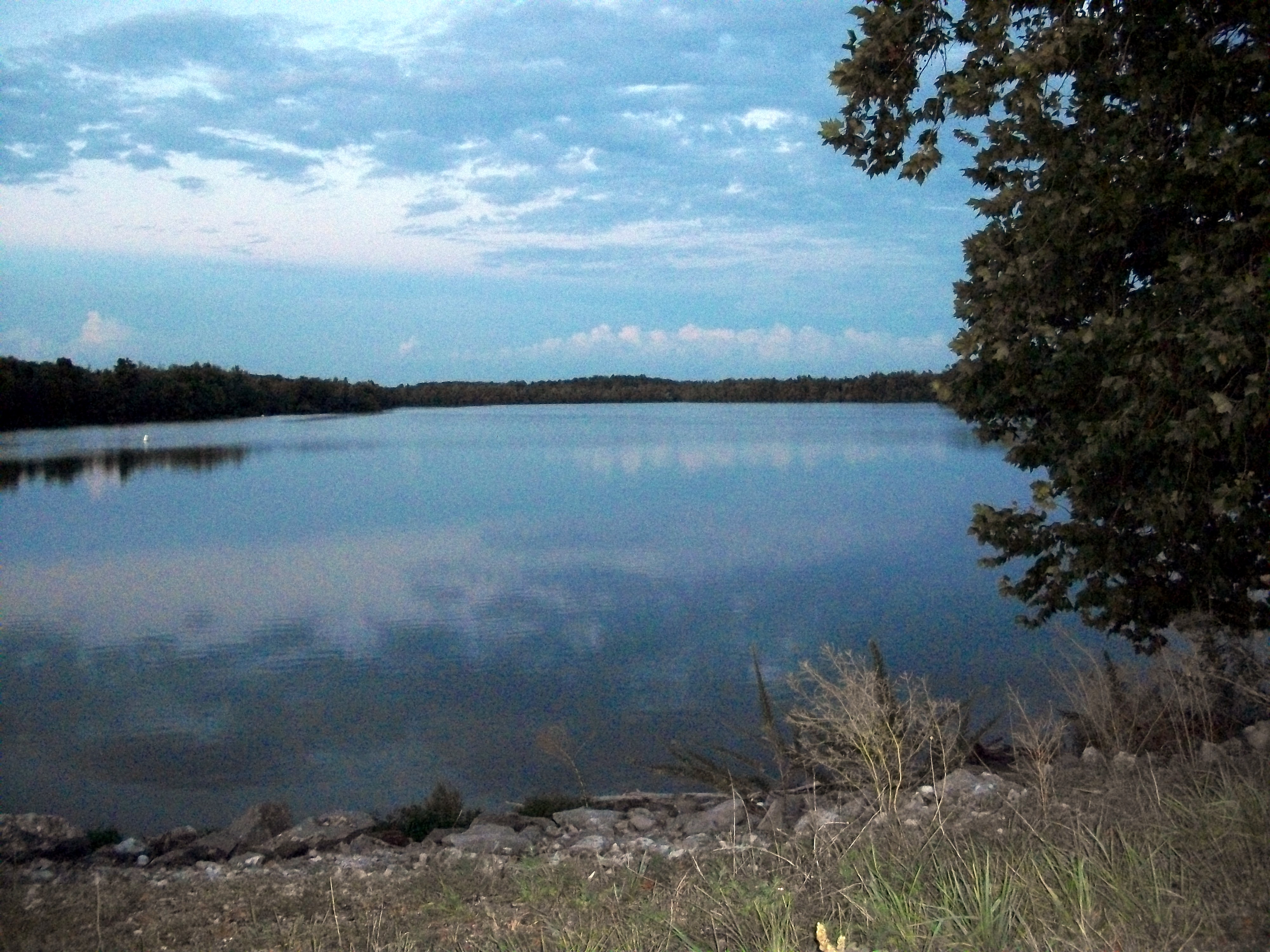
Lake Fayetteville also has a trail running around it maintained by the City of Fayetteville.

- Adams Lake, 36°00′5″N 094°11′02″W, el. 1,286 feet (392 m)
- Arbor Acres Lake, 36°08′5″N 094°14′25″W, el. 1,142 feet (348 m)
- Arkansas Noname 350 Reservoir, 36°00′5″N 094°12′31″W, el. 1,453 feet (443 m)
- Beaver Lake, 36°14′5″N 093°56′34″W, el. 1,122 feet (342 m)
- Broccardo Lake, 36°05′5″N 094°06′35″W, el. 1,388 feet (423 m)
- Budd Kidd Lake, 35°58′5″N 094°21′37″W, el. 1,168 feet (356 m)
- Cantrell Lake, 35°56′5″N 094°25′09″W, el. 1,394 feet (425 m)
- Double Bar Ranch Lake, 36°04′5″N 094°28′07″W, el. 1,027 feet (313 m)
- Heda Lake, 36°12′5″N 094°19′22″W, el. 1,079 feet (329 m)
- Heflin Lake, 35°54′5″N 094°07′27″W, el. 1,867 feet (569 m)
- Kinion Lake, 36°03′5″N 094°22′54″W, el. 1,122 feet (342 m)
- Lake Elmdale, 36°11′5″N 094°12′48″W, el. 1,237 feet (377 m)
- Lake Fayetteville, 36°08′5″N 094°07′51″W, el. 1,240 feet (380 m)
- Lake Lucille, 36°04′5″N 094°09′02″W, el. 1,414 feet (431 m)
- Lake Prairie Grove, 35°55′5″N 094°20′35″W, el. 1,204 feet (367 m)
- Lake Sequoyah, 36°03′5″N 094°03′37″W, el. 1,171 feet (357 m)
- Lake Weddington, 36°05′5″N 094°22′16″W, el. 1,122 feet (342 m)
- Lincoln Lake, 35°59′5″N 094°25′15″W, el. 1,178 feet (359 m)
- Meadows Lake, 36°03′5″N 094°29′44″W, el. 1,047 feet (319 m)
- Rodgers Lake, 35°56′5″N 094°23′36″W, el. 1,447 feet (441 m)
- Tenenbaum Lake, 36°10′5″N 094°03′10″W, el. 1,211 feet (369 m)

== See also ==
- List of lakes in Arkansas
