= Goshen Township, Washington County, Arkansas =

Township of Goshen
- Township
- Location of Goshen Township in Washington County

- Location of Washington County in Arkansas
- Coordinates: 36°5′30″N 93°58′31″W
- Country: United States
- State: Arkansas
- County: Washington
- Established: 1878

Area
  - Total: 30.8 sq mi (80 km^{2})
  - Land: 30.4 sq mi (79 km^{2})
  - Water: 0.4 sq mi (1.0 km^{2}) 0%
- Elevation: 1,227 ft (374 m)

Population (2000)
  - Total: 1,656
  - Density: 54/sq mi (21/km^{2})
- Time zone: UTC-6 (CST)
  - Summer (DST): UTC-5 (CDT)
- Area code: 479
- GNIS feature ID: 69788

Goshen Township is one of thirty-seven townships in Washington County, Arkansas. As of the 2000 census, its total population was 1,656. The township contains the Town of Goshen and some surrounding unincorporated areas. Goshen Township was established in 1878.

== Geography ==
According to the United States Census Bureau, Goshen Township covers an area of 30.8 square miles (80 km^{2}), with 30.4 square miles (79 km^{2}) land and the remaining 0.4 square miles (1.0 km^{2}) water. Goshen Township was formed from parts of Richland Township and Brush Creek Township. Part of Goshen Township was given to Wyman Township near the end of the 19th century.

=== Cities, towns, villages ===
- Goshen
- Mayfield

=== Cemeteries ===
The township contains three cemeteries: Culwell Cemetery, Mayfield Cemetery, and Oxford Bend Cemetery.

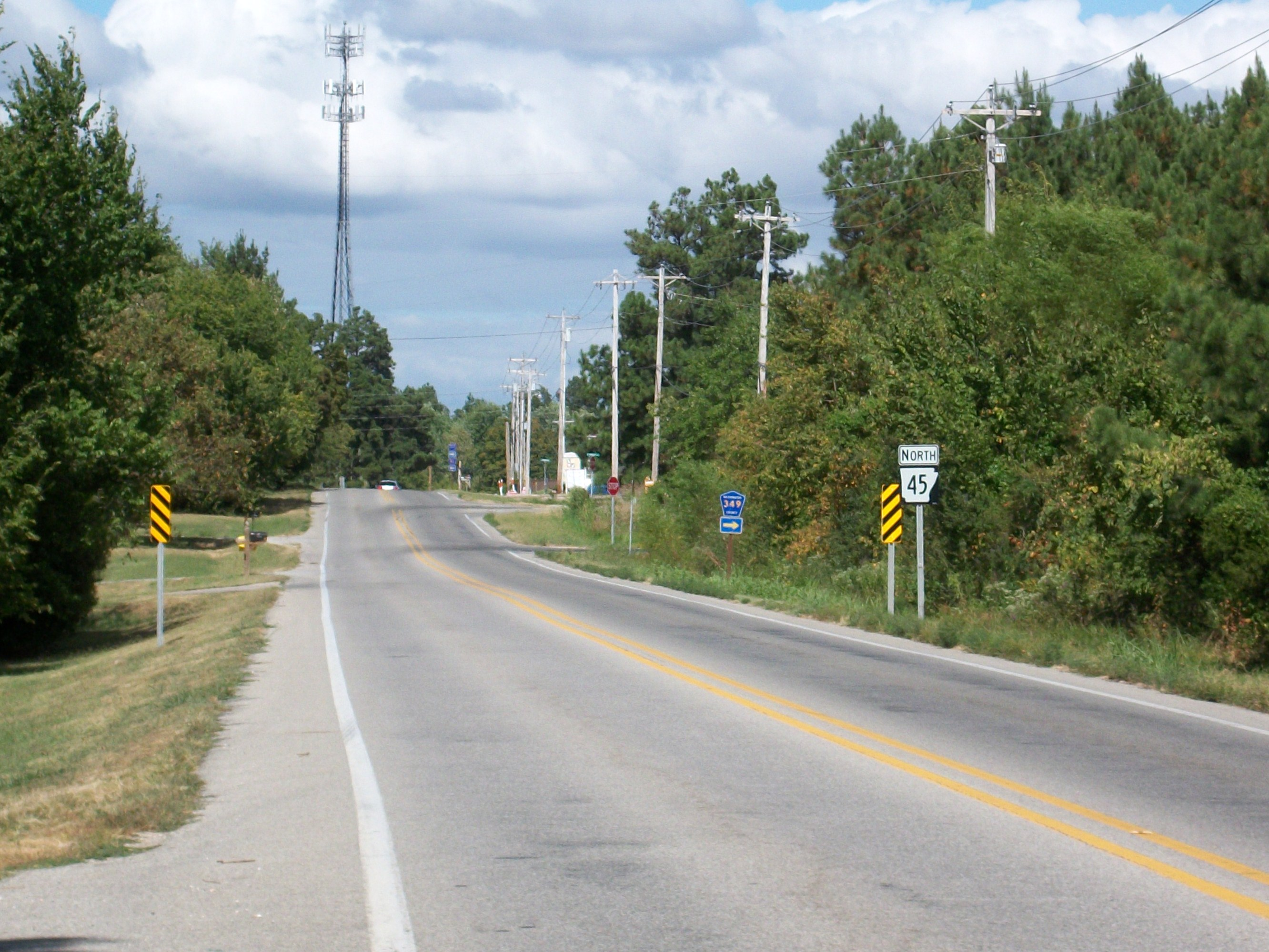
Arkansas Highway 45 runs west from Fayetteville to Goshen.

=== Major routes ===
- Arkansas Highway 45
