= Odell, Arkansas =

Odell
- Unincorporated community
- Location within Arkansas Location within the United States
- Coordinates: 35°46′21″N 94°25′06″W
- Country: United States
- State: Arkansas
- County: Washington
- Township: Boston
- Elevation: 1,644 ft (501 m)
- Time zone: UTC-6 (Central (CST))
  - Summer (DST): UTC-5 (CDT)
- Area code: 479
- GNIS feature ID: 72919

Odell (formerly Stop) is an unincorporated community in Boston Township in southwestern Washington County, Arkansas, United States. The community is one mile north of the county line and the north boundary of the Ozark–St. Francis National Forest. Evansville is four miles west-northwest on Arkansas Highway 59 adjacent to the Arkansas - Oklahoma state line.

Stop first had a postmaster in 1884, one of its co-founders. The community moved from Crawford County north of the county line into Washington County in 1930.
