= Brush Creek Township, Washington County, Arkansas =

Township of Brush Creek
- Township
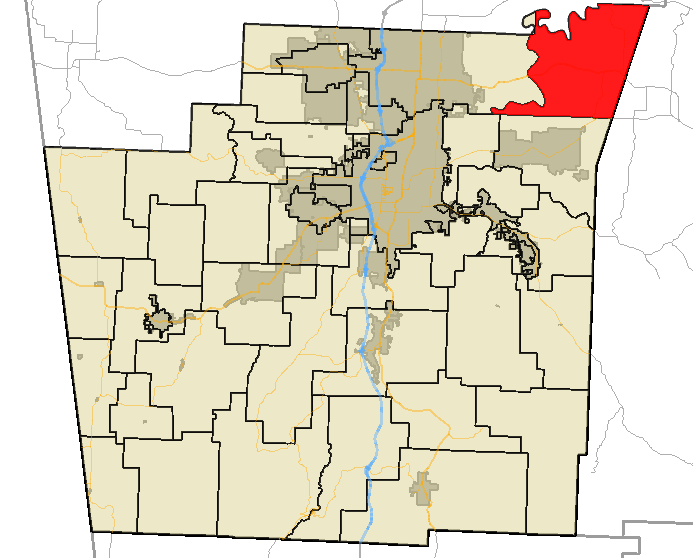
- Brush Creek Township in Washington County, Arkansas
- Coordinates: 36°11′30″N 93°57′46″W
- Country: United States
- State: Arkansas
- County: Washington
- Established: before 1836

Area
  - Total: 39.04 sq mi (101.1 km^{2})
  - Land: 36.96 sq mi (95.7 km^{2})
  - Water: 2.08 sq mi (5.4 km^{2})
- Elevation: 1,316 ft (401 m)

Population (2010)
  - Total: 2,877
  - Density: 77.8/sq mi (30.0/km^{2})
- Time zone: UTC-6 (CST)
  - Summer (DST): UTC-5 (CDT)
- Area code: 479
- GNIS feature ID: 69780

Brush Creek Township is one of 37 townships in Washington County, Arkansas. As of the 2010 census, its unincorporated population was 2,877.

== Geography ==
According to the United States Census Bureau, Brush Creek Township covers an area of 36.96 square miles (95.7 km^{2}) of land and 2.08 square miles (5.4 km^{2}) of water for 39.04 square miles (101.1 km^{2}) in total area. Brush Creek Township gave some area up to Goshen Township in 1879.

=== Cities, towns, villages ===
- Blue Springs Village
- Pilgrim's Rest
- Spring Valley
- War Eagle Cove

=== Cemeteries ===
The township contains Joyce Cemetery and Morriss Cemetery.

=== Major routes ===
- U.S. Route 412
- Arkansas Highway 45 (on township line with Goshen Twp.)
- Arkansas Highway 303
