= Harmon, Washington County, Arkansas =

Harmon, Arkansas
- Unincorporated community
- Harmon's position in Arkansas. Harmon, Arkansas (the United States)
- Coordinates: 36°9′13.3″N 94°16′37.7″W
- Country: United States
- State: Arkansas
- County: Washington
- Township: Harmon
- Elevation: 1,204 ft (367 m)
- Time zone: UTC-6 (Central (CST))
  - Summer (DST): UTC-5 (CDT)
- Area code: 479
- GNIS feature ID: 77120

Harmon (formerly Harman and Wildcat) is an unincorporated community in Harmon Township, Washington County, Arkansas, United States. It is located southwest of Tontitown on Harmon Road.
