= Marrs Hill Township, Washington County, Arkansas =

Township in Arkansas

Township of Marrs Hill
- Township
- Location of Marrs Hill Township in Washington County

- Location of Washington County in Arkansas
- Coordinates: 36°2′15″N 94°20′21″W
- Country: United States
- State: Arkansas
- County: Washington
- Established: before 1850

Area
  - Total: 20.6 sq mi (53 km^{2})
  - Land: 20.6 sq mi (53 km^{2})
  - Water: 0.0 sq mi (0 km^{2}) 0%
- Elevation: 1,106 ft (337 m)

Population (2000)
  - Total: 898
  - Density: 44/sq mi (17/km^{2})
- Time zone: UTC-6 (CST)
  - Summer (DST): UTC-5 (CDT)
- Area code: 479
- GNIS feature ID: 69795

Marrs Hill Township (formerly Mars Hill, Mar Hill, and Marr's Hill) is one of thirty-seven townships in Washington County, Arkansas, United States. As of the 2000 census, its total population was 898.

== Geography ==
According to the United States Census Bureau, Marrs Hill Township covers an area of 20.6 square miles (53 km^{2}); all land.

=== Cities, towns, villages ===
- Jabur (historical)
- Rickert (historical)
- Viney Grove

=== Cemeteries ===
The township contains Bell Cemetery and Rose Cemetery.

=== Major routes ===
The township contains no state highways.
