= Hazel Valley, Arkansas =

- Unincorporated community
- Hazel Valley's position in Arkansas. Hazel Valley, Arkansas (the United States)
- Coordinates: 35°51′40.3″N 93°59′32.7″W
- Country: United States
- State: Arkansas
- County: Washington
- Township: Reed
- Elevation: 1,562 ft (476 m)
- Time zone: UTC-6 (Central (CST))
  - Summer (DST): UTC-5 (CDT)
- ZIP code: 72701
- Area code: 479
- GNIS feature ID: 71952

Hazel Valley is an unincorporated community in Reed Township, Washington County, Arkansas, United States. It is located along County Route 47 (Hazel Valley Road) northeast of Winslow.

A post office was in operation at Hazel Valley from 1875 until 1951.
