= Harmon Township, Washington County, Arkansas =

Township of Harmon
- Township
- Location of Harmon Township in Washington County

- Location of Washington County in Arkansas
- Coordinates: 36°9′30″N 94°15′46″W
- Country: United States
- State: Arkansas
- County: Washington
- Established: 1908

Area
  - Total: 16.5 sq mi (43 km^{2})
  - Land: 16.5 sq mi (43 km^{2})
  - Water: 0.0 sq mi (0 km^{2}) 0%
- Elevation: 1,178 ft (359 m)

Population (2000)
  - Total: 1,394
  - Density: 85/sq mi (33/km^{2})
- Time zone: UTC-6 (CST)
  - Summer (DST): UTC-5 (CDT)
- Area code: 479
- GNIS feature ID: 69790

Harmon Township is one of thirty-seven townships in Washington County, Arkansas, USA. As of the 2000 census, its total population was 1,394.

== Geography ==
According to the United States Census Bureau, Harmon Township covers an area of 16.5 square miles (43 km^{2}), all land. The township was created from Elm Springs Township in 1908.

=== Cities, towns, villages ===
- Harmon
- Blewford (historical)

=== Cemeteries ===
The township contains no cemeteries.

=== Major routes ===
The township contains no state highways.
