= Black Oak, Washington County, Arkansas =

Black Oak, Arkansas
- Unincorporated community
- Black Oak's position in Arkansas. Black Oak, Arkansas (the United States)
- Coordinates: 35°59′00″N 94°04′47″W
- Country: United States
- State: Arkansas
- County: Washington
- Township: White River
- Elevation: 1,286 ft (392 m)

Population
  - Total: 209
- Time zone: UTC-6 (Central (CST))
  - Summer (DST): UTC-5 (CDT)
- Area code: 479
- GNIS feature ID: 56931

Black Oak is a community in White River Township, Washington County, Arkansas, United States. It is located between Greenland and Elkins and lies six miles southeast of Fayetteville.

The community lies along the west bank of the Middle Fork of the White River. The community of Sulphur City lies on the east bank of the river approximately 1.5 miles to the southeast.
