= Gulley, Arkansas =

- Unincorporated community
- Gulley's position in Arkansas. Gulley, Arkansas (the United States)
- Coordinates: 36°8′16″N 94°9′34″W
- Country: United States
- State: Arkansas
- County: Washington
- Township: Johnson
- Elevation: 1,204 ft (367 m)
- Time zone: UTC-6 (Central (CST))
  - Summer (DST): UTC-5 (CDT)
- ZIP code: 72762
- Area code: 479
- GNIS feature ID: 81631

Gulley is an unincorporated community in Johnson Township, Washington County, Arkansas, United States. It is located within Johnson, on Johnson Road along the railroad tracks.
