= Elkins Township, Washington County, Arkansas =

Township of Elkins
- Township
- Location of Elkins Township in Washington County

- Location of Washington County in Arkansas
- Coordinates: 36°01′00.8″N 94°01′32.4″W
- Country: United States
- State: Arkansas
- County: Washington

Area
  - Total: 2.6 sq mi (6.7 km^{2})
  - Land: 2.6 sq mi (6.7 km^{2})
  - Water: 0.0 sq mi (0 km^{2}) 0%
- Elevation: 1,224 ft (373 m)

Population (2000)
  - Total: 1,251
  - Density: 480/sq mi (190/km^{2})
- Time zone: UTC-6 (CST)
  - Summer (DST): UTC-5 (CDT)
- Area code: 479
- GNIS feature ID: 2406950

The Township of Elkins is one of thirty-seven townships in Washington County, Arkansas, USA. As of the 2000 census, its total population was 1,251.

== Geography ==
According to the United States Census Bureau, Elkins Township covers an area of 2.6 square miles (6.7 km^{2}); all land.

=== Cities, towns, villages ===
- Elkins
- Harris

=== Cemeteries ===
The township contains Stokenbury Cemetery.

=== Major routes ===
- Arkansas Highway 16
- Arkansas Highway 74
