= Harris, Arkansas =

- Unincorporated community
- Harris' position in Arkansas. Harris, Arkansas (the United States)
- Coordinates: 36°1′52″N 94°2′52″W
- Country: United States
- State: Arkansas
- County: Washington
- Township: Elkins
- Elevation: 1,198 ft (365 m)
- Time zone: UTC-6 (Central (CST))
  - Summer (DST): UTC-5 (CDT)
- Area code: 479
- GNIS feature ID: 49889

Harris is an unincorporated community in Elkins Township, Washington County, Arkansas, United States. It is located east of Fayetteville and within the city limits of Elkins near Arkansas Highway 16.

A post office was established at Harris in 1888, and remained in operation until 1957.
