= Sulphur City, Arkansas =

- Unincorporated community
- Sulphur City's position in Arkansas. Sulphur City, Arkansas (the United States)
- Coordinates: 35°57′54″N 94°03′2″W
- Country: United States
- State: Arkansas
- County: Washington
- Township: White River
- First post office: 1882
- Elevation: 1,358 ft (414 m)
- Time zone: UTC-6 (Central (CST))
  - Summer (DST): UTC-5 (CDT)
- Area code: 479
- GNIS feature ID: 78490

Sulphur City (formerly Sulphur Springs and Mankins) is an unincorporated community in White River Township, Washington County, Arkansas, United States. It is located at the intersection of Black Oak Road (Washington County Road 57 CR 57) and Whitehouse Road (CR 43). The community is on the east bank of the Middle Fork of the White River. The community of Black Oak lies approximately 1.5 miles to the northwest on the opposite side of the river.

== History ==
The first settler in the area was Peter Mankins Sr., who ran a prosperous livestock business until the outbreak of the Civil War. A post office was built in 1882, first known as Sulphur Springs, but the name was changed to Mankins since another community by that name already existed in Benton County. Shortly after the change, the community was renamed Sulphur City. The post office closed in 1960.
