= Viney Grove, Arkansas =

- Unincorporated community
- Viney Grove's position in Arkansas. Viney Grove, Arkansas (the United States)
- Coordinates: 36°00′30″N 94°19′49″W
- Country: United States
- State: Arkansas
- County: Washington
- Township: Marrs Hill
- Elevation: 1,165 ft (355 m)
- Time zone: UTC-6 (Central (CST))
  - Summer (DST): UTC-5 (CDT)
- ZIP code: 72753
- Area code: 479
- GNIS feature ID: 78661

Viney Grove (formerly Vineygrove) is an unincorporated community in Marrs Hill Township, Washington County, Arkansas, United States. It is located north of Prairie Grove and Prairie Grove Battlefield State Park along County Road 37.

A post office was established at Viney Grove in 1870, and remained in operation until 1905.
