= Mayfield, Arkansas =

- Unincorporated community
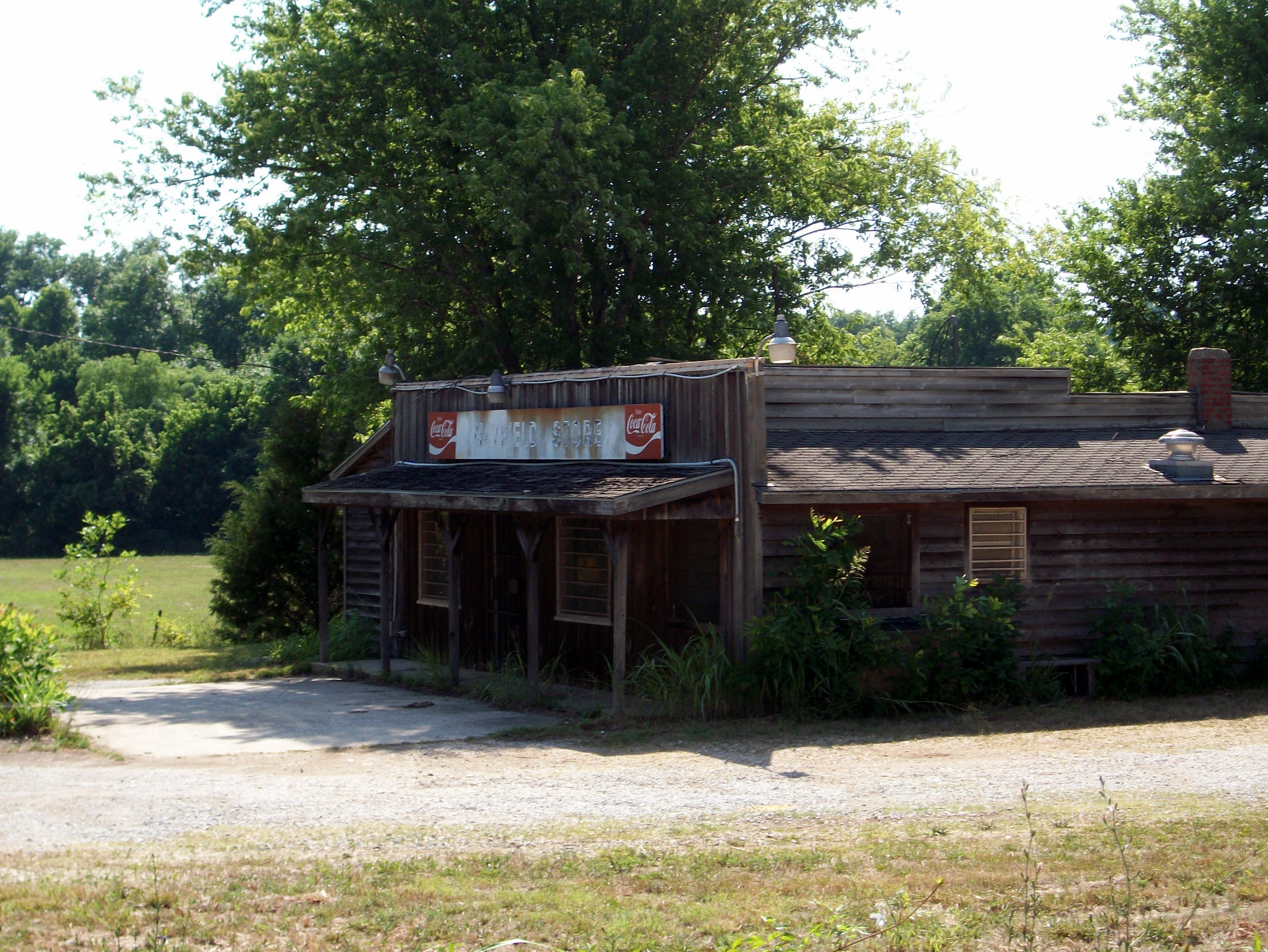
- Mayfield Store in Mayfield

- Mayfield's position in Arkansas. Mayfield, Arkansas (the United States)
- Coordinates: 36°8′1″N 93°56′39″W
- Country: United States
- State: Arkansas
- County: Washington
- Township: Goshen
- Elevation: 1,210 ft (370 m)
- Time zone: UTC-6 (Central (CST))
  - Summer (DST): UTC-5 (CDT)
- Area code: 479
- GNIS feature ID: 57106

Mayfield is an unincorporated community in Goshen Township, Washington County, Arkansas, United States. It is located at the intersection of Arkansas highways 45 and 303.
