= Skylight, Arkansas =

- Unincorporated community
- Skylight's position in Arkansas. Skylight, Arkansas (the United States)
- Coordinates: 35°50′32″N 94°23′40″W
- Country: United States
- State: Arkansas
- County: Washington
- Township: Boston
- Elevation: 1,778 ft (542 m)
- Time zone: UTC-6 (Central (CST))
  - Summer (DST): UTC-5 (CDT)
- Area code: 479
- GNIS feature ID: 73599

Skylight is an unincorporated community in Boston Township, of southwestern Washington County, Arkansas, United States. Skylight lies about one mile west-northwest of Skylight Mountain (elev. 1,880 feet (570 m)).
