= Rochelle Riviera, Arkansas =

- Unincorporated community
- Rochelle Riviera's position in Arkansas Rochelle Riviera, Arkansas (the United States)
- Coordinates: 36°9′15″N 94°1′5″W
- Country: United States
- State: Arkansas
- County: Washington
- Township: Springdale
- Elevation: 1,250 ft (381 m)
- Time zone: UTC-6 (Central (CST))
  - Summer (DST): UTC-5 (CDT)
- ZIP code: 72764
- Area code: 479
- GNIS feature ID: 65427

Rochelle Riviera is an unincorporated community in Springdale Township, Washington County, Arkansas, United States. Per the coordinates it is located south of US 412 east of Springdale on the north bank of the White River.
