= War Eagle Cove, Arkansas =

- Unincorporated community
- War Eagle Cove's position in Arkansas. War Eagle Cove, Arkansas (the United States)
- Coordinates: 36°10′34″N 93°56′06″W
- Country: United States
- State: Arkansas
- County: Washington
- Township: Brush Creek
- Elevation: 1,158 ft (353 m)
- Time zone: UTC-6 (Central (CST))
  - Summer (DST): UTC-5 (CDT)
- Area code: 479
- GNIS feature ID: 65475

War Eagle Cove is an unincorporated community in Brush Creek Township, Washington County, Arkansas, United States. The Cove is located on the War Eagle Creek arm of Beaver Lake.
