= Johnson Township, Washington County, Arkansas =

Township of Illinois
- Township
- Location of Johnson Township in Washington County

- Location of Washington County in Arkansas
- Coordinates: 36°8′0″N 94°10′31″W
- Country: United States
- State: Arkansas
- County: Washington

Area
  - Total: 8.9 sq mi (23 km^{2})
  - Land: 8.9 sq mi (23 km^{2})
  - Water: 0.0 sq mi (0 km^{2}) 0%
- Elevation: 1,240 ft (380 m)

Population (2000)
  - Total: 3,076
  - Density: 347/sq mi (134/km^{2})
- Time zone: UTC-6 (CST)
  - Summer (DST): UTC-5 (CDT)
- Area code: 479
- GNIS feature ID: 69792

Johnson Township is one of thirty-seven townships in Washington County, Arkansas, USA. As of the 2000 census, its total population was 3,076.

== Geography ==
According to the United States Census Bureau, Johnson Township covers an area of 8.9 square miles (23 km^{2}), all land.

=== Cities, towns, villages ===
- Gulley
- Johnson

=== Cemeteries ===
The township contains Stuckey Cemetery.

=== Major routes ===
- Interstate 540/US 71/US 62
- Arkansas Highway 112
