= Pilgrim's Rest, Arkansas =

- Unincorporated community
- Pilgrim's Rest's position in Arkansas. Pilgrim's Rest, Arkansas (the United States)
- Coordinates: 36°11′14″N 93°59′39″W
- Country: United States
- State: Arkansas
- County: Washington
- Township: Brush Creek
- Elevation: 1,398 ft (426 m)
- Time zone: UTC-6 (Central (CST))
  - Summer (DST): UTC-5 (CDT)
- Area code: 479
- GNIS feature ID: 77999

Pilgrim's Rest (also Nob Hill) is an unincorporated community in Brush Creek Township, Washington County, Arkansas, United States.
