= Habberton, Arkansas =

- Unincorporated community
- Habberton' position in Arkansas. Habberton, Arkansas (the United States)
- Coordinates: 36°6′54″N 94°3′6″W
- Country: United States
- State: Arkansas
- County: Washington
- Township: Prairie
- Elevation: 1,283 ft (391 m)
- Time zone: UTC-6 (Central (CST))
  - Summer (DST): UTC-5 (CDT)
- ZIP code: 72704
- Area code: 479
- GNIS feature ID: 77099

Habberton (formerly Haberton) is an unincorporated community in Prairie Township, Washington County, Arkansas, United States. It is located along the city limits of Goshen at the intersection of Habberton Road and Habberton Avenue.
