= Elm Springs Township, Washington County, Arkansas =

Township of Elm Springs
- Township
- Location of Elm Springs Township in Washington County

- Location of Washington County in Arkansas
- Coordinates: 36°16′25.3″N 94°11′41.7″W
- Country: United States
- State: Arkansas
- County: Washington
- Established: 1852

Area
  - Total: 15.0 sq mi (39 km^{2})
  - Land: 14.9 sq mi (39 km^{2})
  - Water: 0.1 sq mi (0.26 km^{2})
- Elevation: 1,175 ft (358 m)

Population (2000)
  - Total: 1,912
  - Density: 128/sq mi (49/km^{2})
- Time zone: UTC-6 (CST)
  - Summer (DST): UTC-5 (CDT)
- Area code: 479
- GNIS feature ID: 69787

The Township of Elm Springs is one of thirty-seven townships in Washington County, Arkansas, US. As of the 2000 census, its total population was 1,912.

== Geography ==
According to the United States Census Bureau, Elm Springs Township covers an area of 15.0 square miles (39 km^{2}); with 14.9 square miles (39 km^{2}) land and the remaining 0.1 square miles (0.26 km^{2}) water. It was cut from Clear Creek Township in 1852. By 1920 Elm Springs Township had given part to Harmon Township and Litteral Township.

=== Cities, towns, villages ===
- Elm Springs

=== Cemeteries ===
- Elm Springs Cemetery

=== Major routes ===
- U.S. Highway 412 (formerly AR 68)
- Highway 112
