= Starr Hill Township, Washington County, Arkansas =

Coordinates: 35.963°N 94.466°W

Starr Hill Township is an inactive township in Washington County, Arkansas, United States.

A variant name was "Star Hill Township". The township was established in 1884.
