= Lake Wedington Historic District =

Historic district in Arkansas, United States

- U.S. National Register of Historic Places
- U.S. Historic district
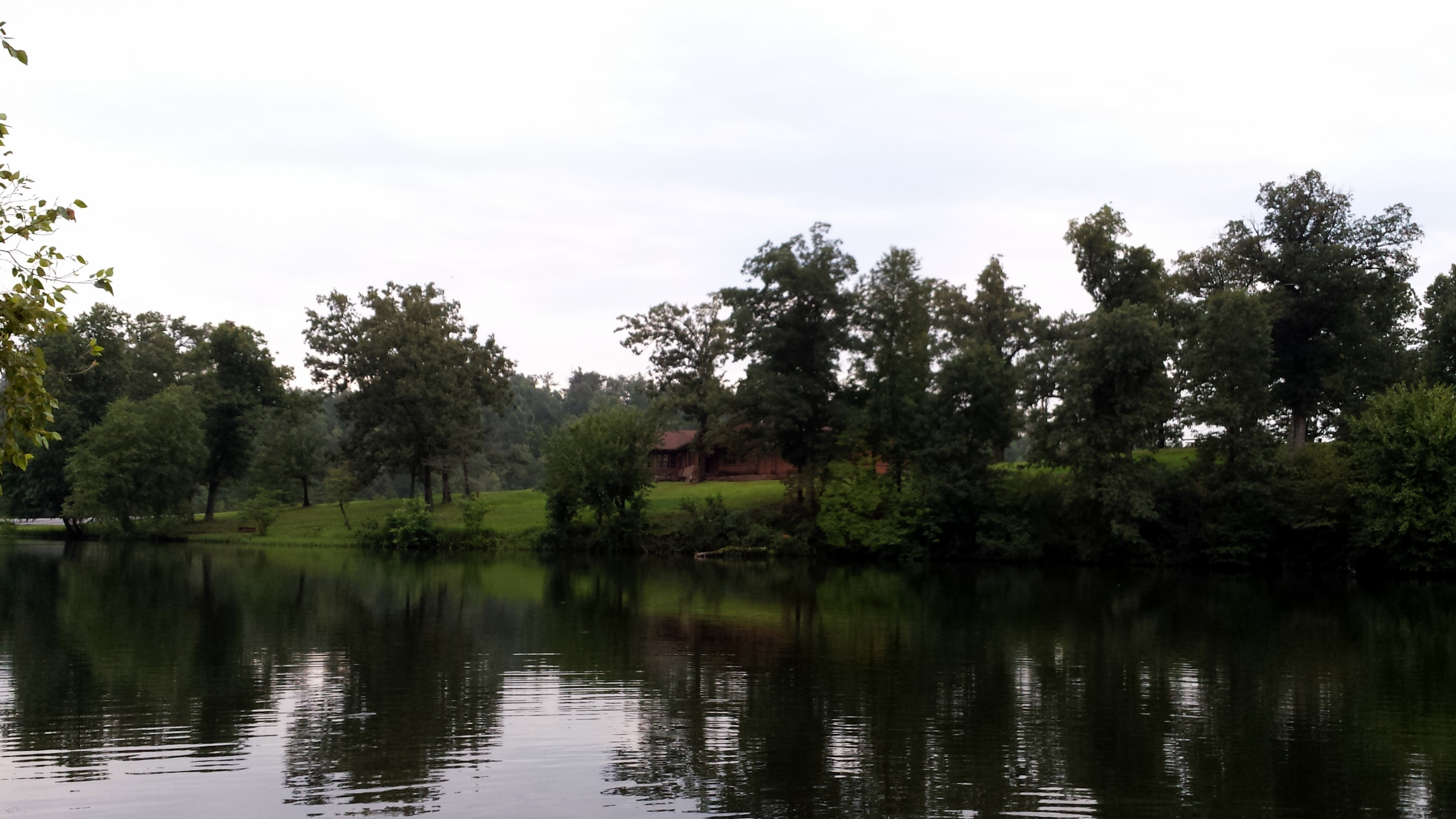
- The lake with historic recreational facility in the background behind trees

- Location within Arkansas Location within the United States
- Nearest city: Savoy, Arkansas
- Coordinates: 36°5′23″N 94°22′15″W
- Area: 170 acres (69 ha)
- Built: 1936
- Architect: Young, Paul; WPA
- Architectural style: Rustic
- NRHP reference No.: 94001612
- Added to NRHP: September 11, 1995

The Lake Wedington Historic District (locally Lake Wedington, sometimes spelled incorrectly Lake Weddington) is a US Historic District in Washington County, Arkansas. The 170-acre (69 ha) historic district is located within the 424-acre (172 ha) Lake Wedington Recreation Area within the Ozark Mountains. The area is administered by the United States Forest Service within the Ozark–St. Francis National Forest.

== Facilities ==
Surrounding the 102-acre (41 ha) Lake Wedington are 18 family campsites and 19 family picnic sites, built by the Works Progress Administration in 1938. The area also contains six modernized cabins for overnight visitors, complete with air conditioning. A 7-mile (11 km) hiking trail is available year-round. Further amenities include volleyball courts, playgrounds, horseshoes, a boat ramp and boathouse. The area closed in 2019 following failure of the area's water well. The area remains closed; $4.7 million of funding for repairs was included in the 2024 appropriations bill passed by the 118th United States Congress. Construction to connect the facility to the Washington Water Authority public water system started June 29, 2026, no completion date has been established.
