= Brentwood, Arkansas =

- Unincorporated community
- Brentwood's position in Arkansas. Brentwood, Arkansas (the United States)
- Coordinates: 35°51′36″N 94°06′26″W
- Country: United States
- State: Arkansas
- County: Washington
- Township: Crawford
- Elevation: 1,483 ft (452 m)
- Time zone: UTC-6 (Central (CST))
  - Summer (DST): UTC-5 (CDT)
- Area code: 479
- GNIS feature ID: 81845

Brentwood (formerly Gunter) is an unincorporated community in Crawford Township in southeastern Washington County, Arkansas, United States. It is located on U.S. Route 71 between West Fork and Winslow. The West Fork of the White River flows past the southwest side of the community.
