= Winslow Township, Washington County, Arkansas =

Coordinates: 35.794°N 94.109°W

Winslow Township is an inactive township in Washington County, Arkansas, United States.

Winslow Township was established in 1884.
