= Washington County, Arkansas =

County in Arkansas, United States

- County
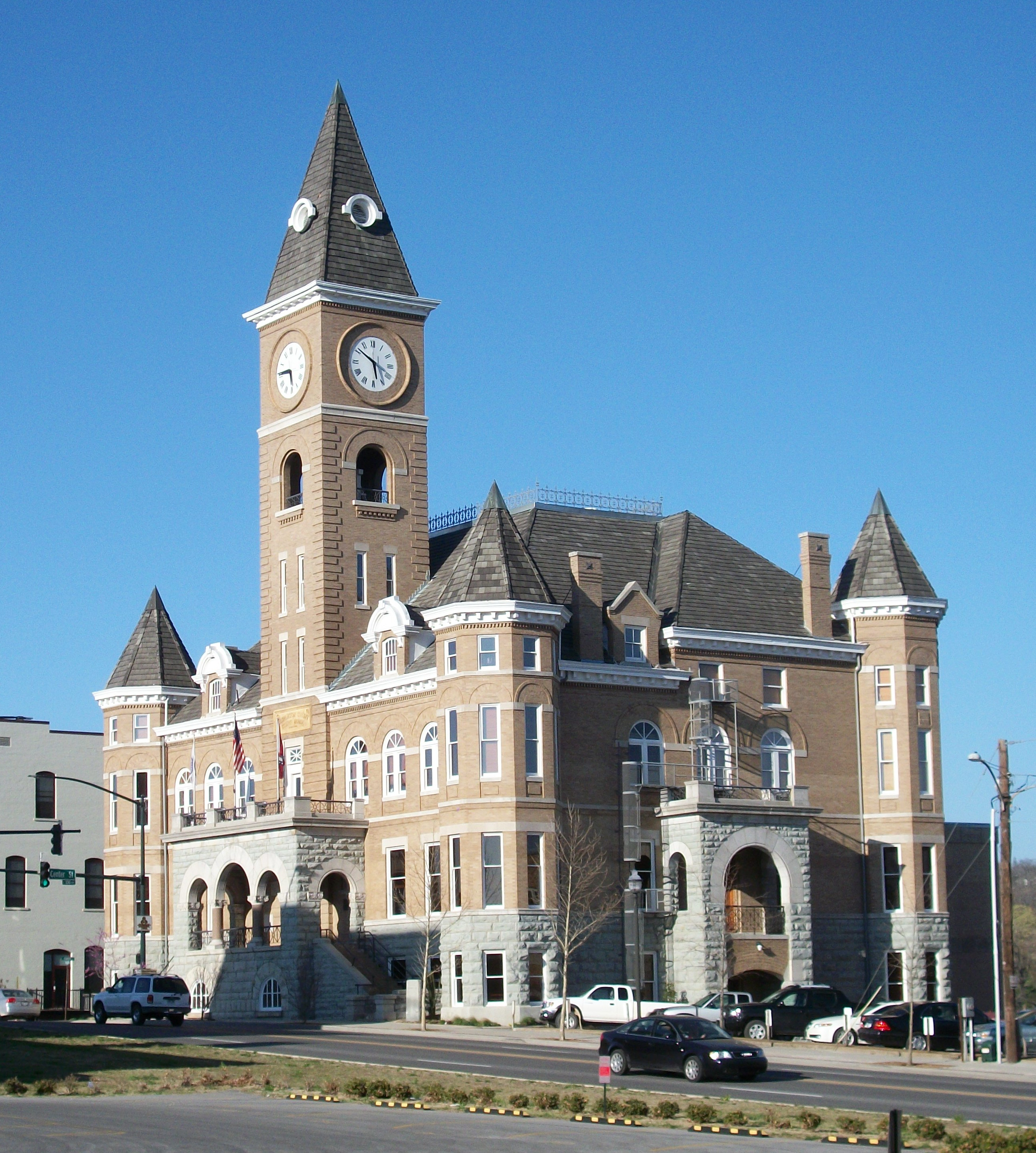
- Historic Washington County Courthouse, Fayetteville

- Flag Seal

- Location within the U.S. state of Arkansas
- Coordinates: 36°00′09″N 94°13′38″W
- Country: United States
- State: Arkansas
- Founded: October 17, 1828
- Named for: George Washington
- Seat: Fayetteville
- Largest city: Fayetteville

Area
  - Total: 951.72 sq mi (2,464.9 km^{2})
  - Land: 945.43 sq mi (2,448.7 km^{2})
  - Water: 6.29 sq mi (16.3 km^{2}) 0.6%

Population (2020)
  - Total: 245,871
  - Estimate (2025): 271,213 ▲
  - Density: 260.06/sq mi (100.41/km^{2})
- Time zone: UTC−6 (Central)
  - Summer (DST): UTC−5 (CDT)
- ZIP Codes: 72701, 72703, 72704, 72717, 72727, 72729, 72730, 72738, 72744, 72749, 72753, 72761, 72762, 72764, 72769, 72773, 72774, 72959
- Area code: 479
- Congressional district: 3rd
- Website: www.washingtoncountyar.gov

Washington County is a regional economic, educational, and cultural hub in the Northwest Arkansas region. Created as Arkansas's 17th county on November 30, 1848, Washington County has 13 incorporated municipalities, including Fayetteville, the county seat, and Springdale. The county is also the site of small towns, bedroom communities, and unincorporated places. The county is named for George Washington, the first President of the United States. Located within the Ozark Mountains, the county is roughly divided into two halves: the rolling Springfield Plateau in the more populous north of the county and the steeper, forested Boston Mountains in the much less populated south. It contains three segments of the Ozark National Forest, two state parks, two Wildlife Management Areas, the Garrett Hollow Natural Area, and dozens of city parks. Other historical features such as Civil War battlefields, log cabins, one-room school houses, community centers, and museums describe the history and culture of Washington County. Washington County occupies 951.72 square miles (243,220 ha) and contained a population of 245,871 people in 89,249 households as of the 2020 Census, ranking it 4th in size and 3rd in population among the state's 75 counties. The economy is largely based on the business/management, education, sales, office/administration, and poultry production industries. Poverty rates, median household income, and unemployment rates best state averages, but lag national trends. Washington County has long had a reputation for education in the state. The University of Arkansas, the largest four-year college in the state, was established in Fayetteville in 1871. A Washington County campus of the Northwest Arkansas Community College was opened in 2019 in Springdale. Today, Washington County contains eight public school districts, including two of the largest districts in the state (Springdale Public Schools and Fayetteville Public Schools) and two private schools. It is included in the Fayetteville–Springdale–Rogers Metropolitan Statistical Area.

== History ==
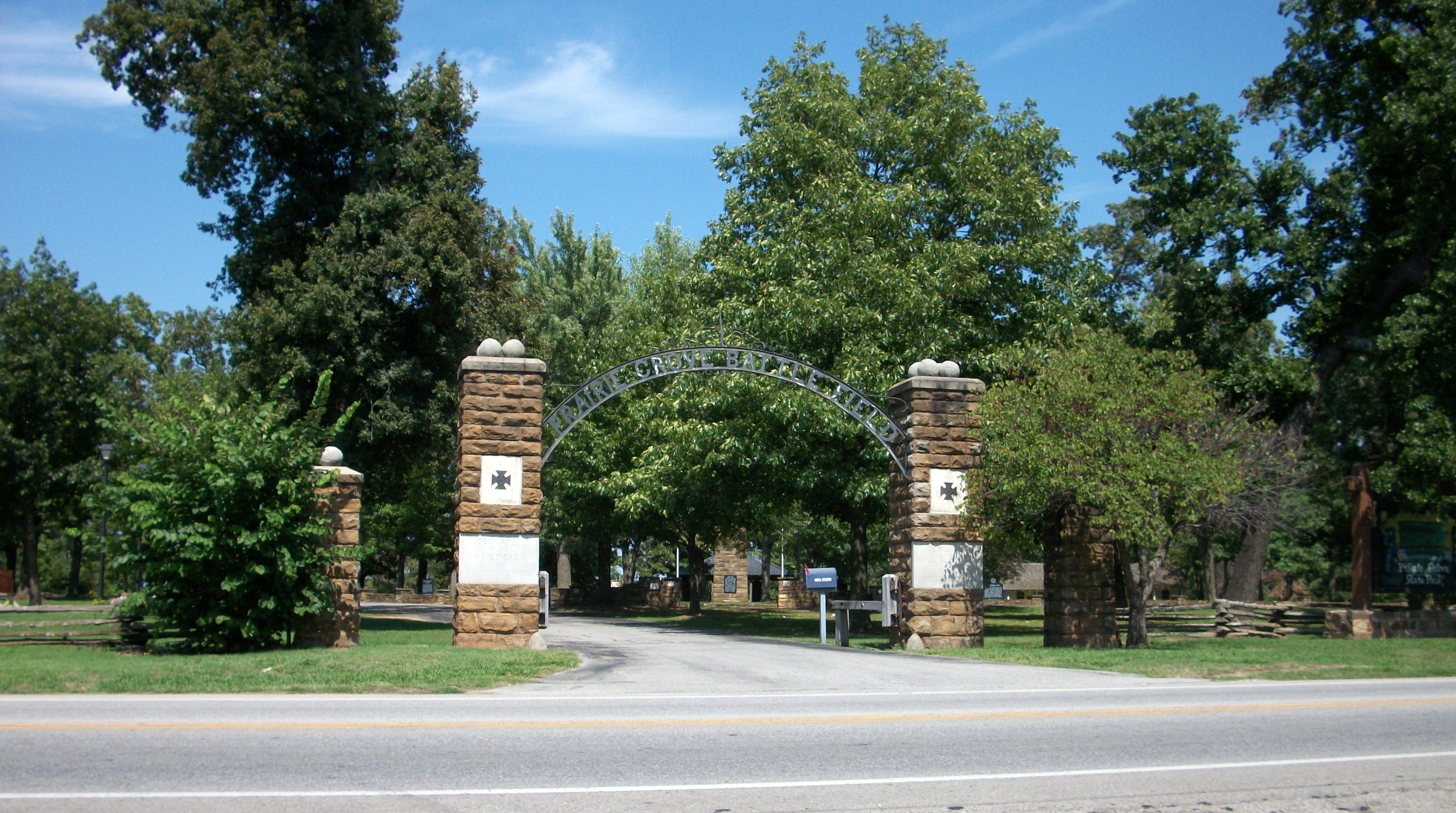
The site of the Civil War battle at Prairie Grove is a state park.

Washington County began as part of the Cherokee Territory, following an 1817 treaty. The area was next known as Lovely County, and one year later Washington County was created after another Cherokee treaty. The court house was centrally located in the city of Washington, modern-day Fayetteville (renamed to avoid confusion with Washington, Arkansas in South Arkansas). The Lee Creek Valley in southern Washington County contained many of the county's early settlements, including Cane Hill and Evansville.

Arkansas College and Cane Hill College were both founded in Washington County within a day of each other in 1834, with the University of Arkansas being founded in Fayetteville in 1871. The county witnessed major battles during the American Civil War, including the Battle of Fayetteville, the Battle of Prairie Grove, and the Battle of Cane Hill. The county then was sparsely settled and the residents were divided in their allegiance, since it had few enslaved people, plantations almost nonexistent, and political news came by White River travelers, not from the pro-Confederate southern part of the state. A Butterfield Overland Mail route was established through the county in 1858, causing more families to settle there.

In 1856, what appears to be an act of vengeance, prompted by a Black woman killing, in self-defense, a white man who sexually assaulted her, led to the lynching of two Black men and the hanging of another.

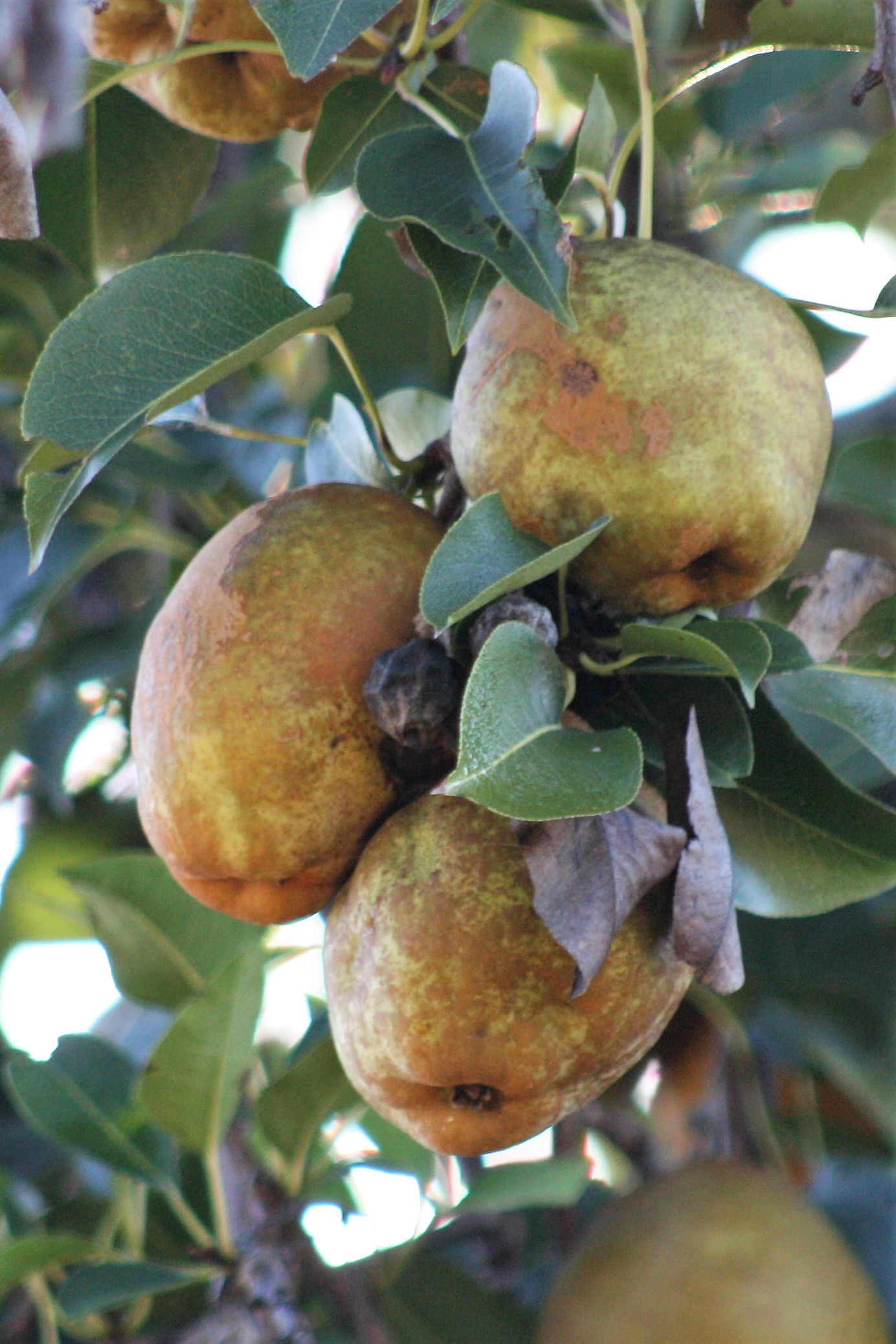
Heritage apple tree near Woolsey farmstead, Fayetteville

The economy of Washington County was based on apples in the late 19th century. A mixture of wet weather, altitude, and loamy soils provided a good environment for apple orchards. First planted in areas around Lincoln, Evansville, and Cane Hill in the 1830s, apple orchards began all across the county. The United States Census reported a crop of 614,924 bushels of apples produced by the county in 1900, the highest in the state. Several varieties of apple were discovered in the area including Shannon Pippin, Wilson June, and most notably the Arkansas Black. The Ben Davis became the apple of choice in the area for sale and shipment across the region. Corn became the dominant crop, outselling apples by almost $500,000 in 1900.

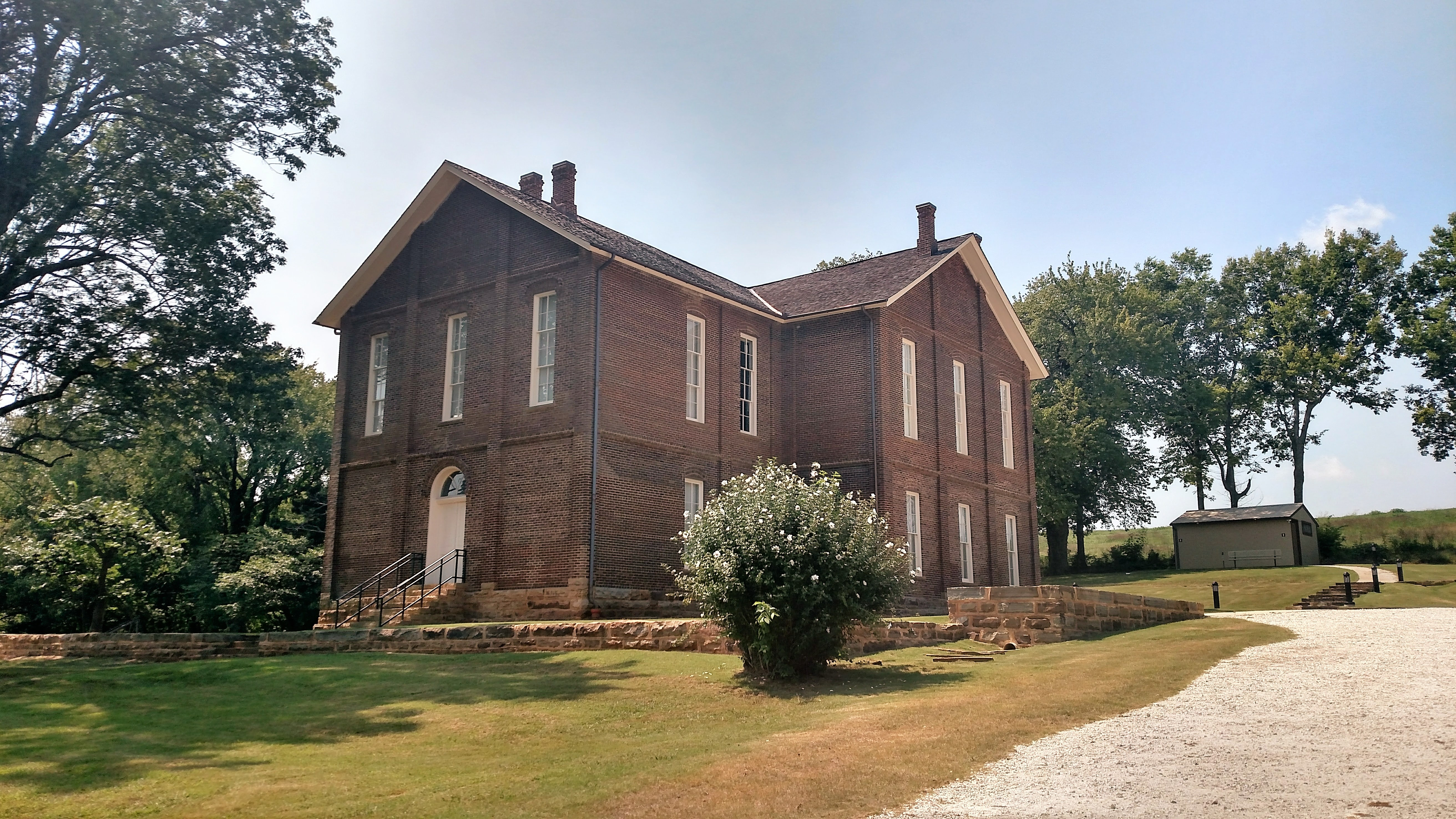
Cane Hill College was founded in Cane Hill one day after Arkansas College in Fayetteville. It was in operation from 1834 to 1891.

Arkansas Industrial University was founded in the growing community of Fayetteville in 1871 after William McIlroy a donated farmland for the site. The university changed its name in 1899 to the University of Arkansas. Railroads came to Washington County after the St. Louis – San Francisco Railway (Frisco) decided to build a line to Texas through Fort Smith. Two possible routes were proposed, one passing through Prairie Grove, the other through Fayetteville. Many Fayetteville residents and farmers sold or donated land for the right of way to influence the choice. They were successful and in 1881 the first passenger train arrived at Fayetteville. The county continued to grow with more churches and schools after the railroad's completion. Rural parts of the county began losing population in the 1920s during the Great Depression, when high taxes compelled residents to move to Fayetteville or west to Oklahoma. The rural areas later became the Ozark National Forest and Devil's Den State Park.

== Geography ==
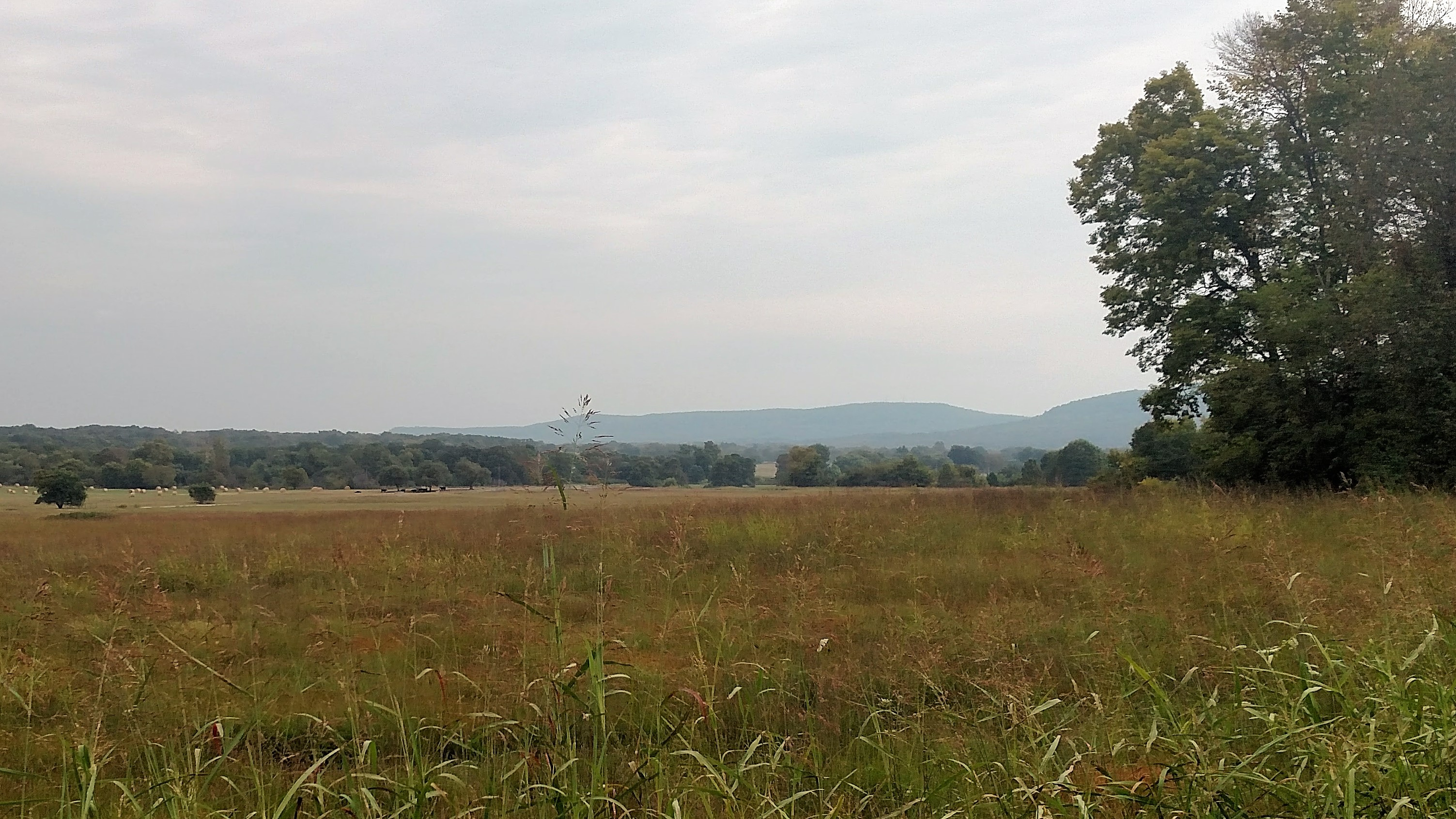
The Lower Boston Mountains (background) rise from the flat, grassy Springfield Plateau at Prairie Grove Battlefield State Park in Prairie Grove

The county is located in the Ozark Mountains, a small mountain region between the Appalachians and the Rocky Mountains with distinct settlement patterns, history, and culture from surrounding agrarian regions (the Interior Plains of the Midwest United States and Mississippi Delta to the southeast), and the flat ranchlands of the Great Plains to the west. In the Ozarks, population density is low; recreation, logging, and poultry and livestock farming are the primary land uses. Pastureland or hayland occur on nearly level ridgetops, benches, and valley floors. Water quality in streams is generally exceptional. Most of the county is within the mountainous, forested Boston Mountains, with the north and west portions made up of the nearly level to rolling Springfield Plateau. Karst features such as springs, losing streams, sinkholes and caves are common.

Washington County has a total area of 951.72 square miles (2,464.9 km^{2}), of which 945.43 square miles (2,448.7 km^{2}) is land and 6.29 square miles (16.3 km^{2}) (0.6%) is water. It is the fourth-largest county by area in Arkansas.

The county is located approximately 112 miles (180 km) east of Tulsa, Oklahoma, 192 miles (309 km) northwest of Little Rock, 233 miles (375 km) south of Kansas City, and 335 miles (539 km) northeast of the Dallas–Fort Worth metroplex. (Note: Mileages from Washington County are based on highway miles using county seat Fayetteville for Washington County.) Washington County is surrounded by Benton County to the north, rural Madison County to the east, the rural Crawford County to the south, and Adair County, Oklahoma to the west.

=== Geology ===
Washington County sits on a basement of Precambrian granite and rhyolite, as most of the continental interior of the United States does. Much of the county's geologic history must be inferred from nearby Oklahoma and Missouri research, due to the steepness of the more recently formed mountains that did not form in the neighboring states. This igneous material was eroded until the Paleozoic, when oceans covered the now-low-lying area. These oceans came and retreated for 300 million years, depositing various different sediments during that time. This created fossiliferous limestone and ripple marked-sandstone, both present throughout the north part of the county as evidence of ancient oceans.

Sediments were deposited from the Devonian, Mississippian, and Pennsylvanian periods. During this deposition period, the county had a climate similar to that of the present-day Bahamas, as the equator was north of Washington County. The Devonian brought mostly shales, the Mississippian brought the limestones and chert visible in the bluffs. This chert is present throughout most of the county. The county is also home to the Boone Formation (red soils), white limestones, the Wedington Sandstone, the Bastesville Sandstone, the Pitkin formation (ocean-fossil limestone), and the Fayetteville Shale.

Settlers were attracted to the area by its numerous streams, used to power gristmills, sandstones and clays for use in construction, lime-sweetened soil, and chert for road construction.

Today, Washington County consists of two main formations, the Boston Mountains and the Springfield Plateau. During the late Pennsylvanian, sediments were deposited on top of the Springfield Plateau. The area was uplifted during the Ouachita orogeny and subsequent erosion formed the rugged Boston Mountains. Erosion of these sediments causes the Boston Mountains to be carved steeply in the south, while in the north of the county, the Boston Mountain sediments are almost entirely eroded, exposing the older rocks of the Springfield Plateau.

=== Hydrology ===
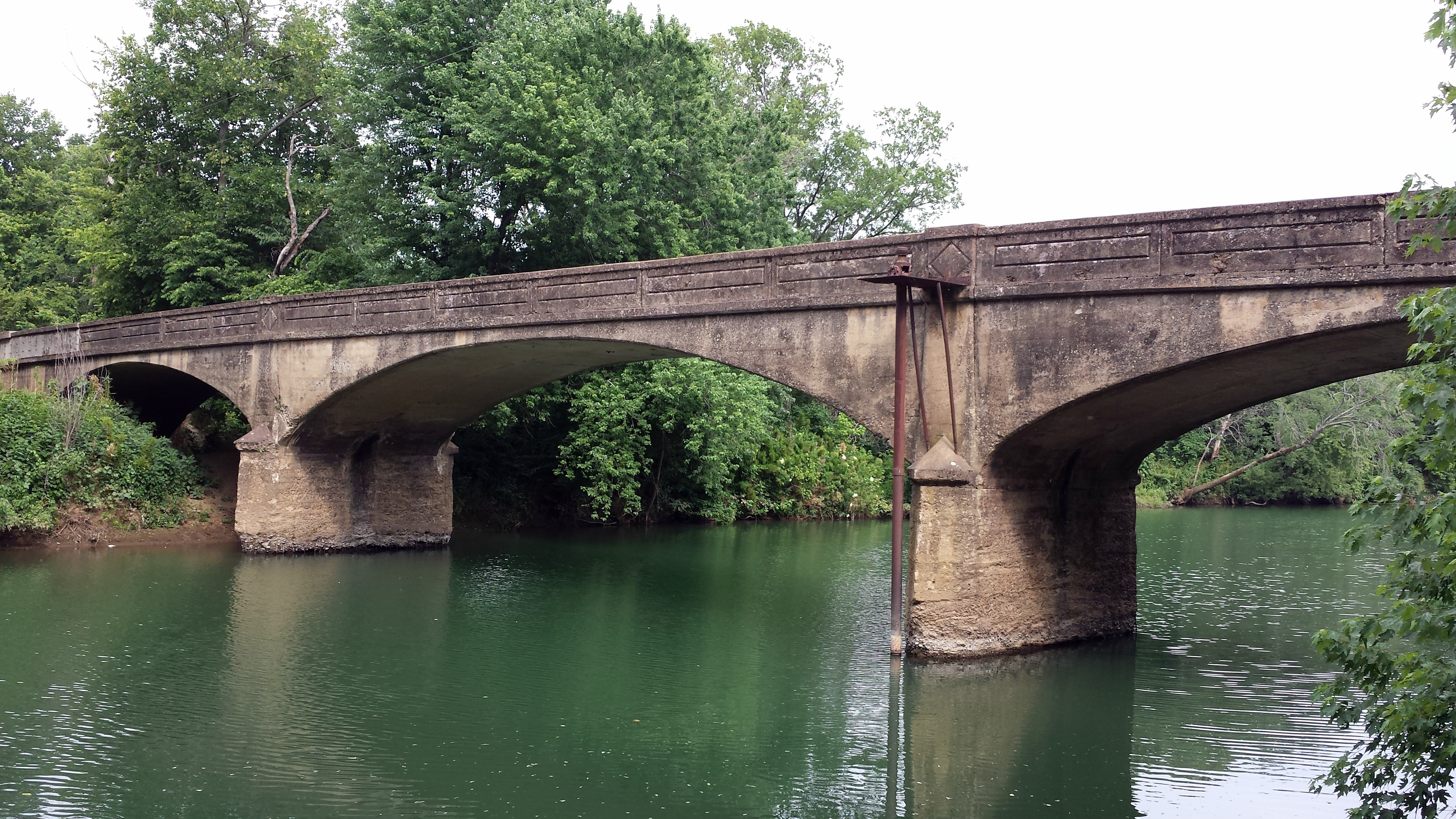
White River Bridge at Elkins

Washington County fits within three regional watersheds: the eastern half drains to the White River (or Beaver Lake) and the west drains to the Illinois River, with a small segment in the south draining to the Arkansas River via the Lee Creek watershed. Within the county, Clear Creek, Moore's Creek, Richland Creek, and Spring Creek are important watercourses. The county also contains eleven natural springs listed by the United States Geological Survey Board on Geographic Names, including Elkhorn Springs, Elm Springs, and Greathouse Spring in Johnson.

As a mountainous county, it contains only one natural lake and several reservoirs. Most of these reservoirs, such as Lake Prairie Grove and Lincoln Lake were created for flood control or water supplies in the 20th century. Beaver Lake, located mostly in Benton County with reaches extending into Washington and Madison counties, is the sixth-largest lake in Arkansas, and a source of recreation, tourism, and drinking water for the Northwest Arkansas region. Washington County also contains Lake Wedington, located in the Ozark National Forest west of Fayetteville on Highway 16.

=== Protected areas ===
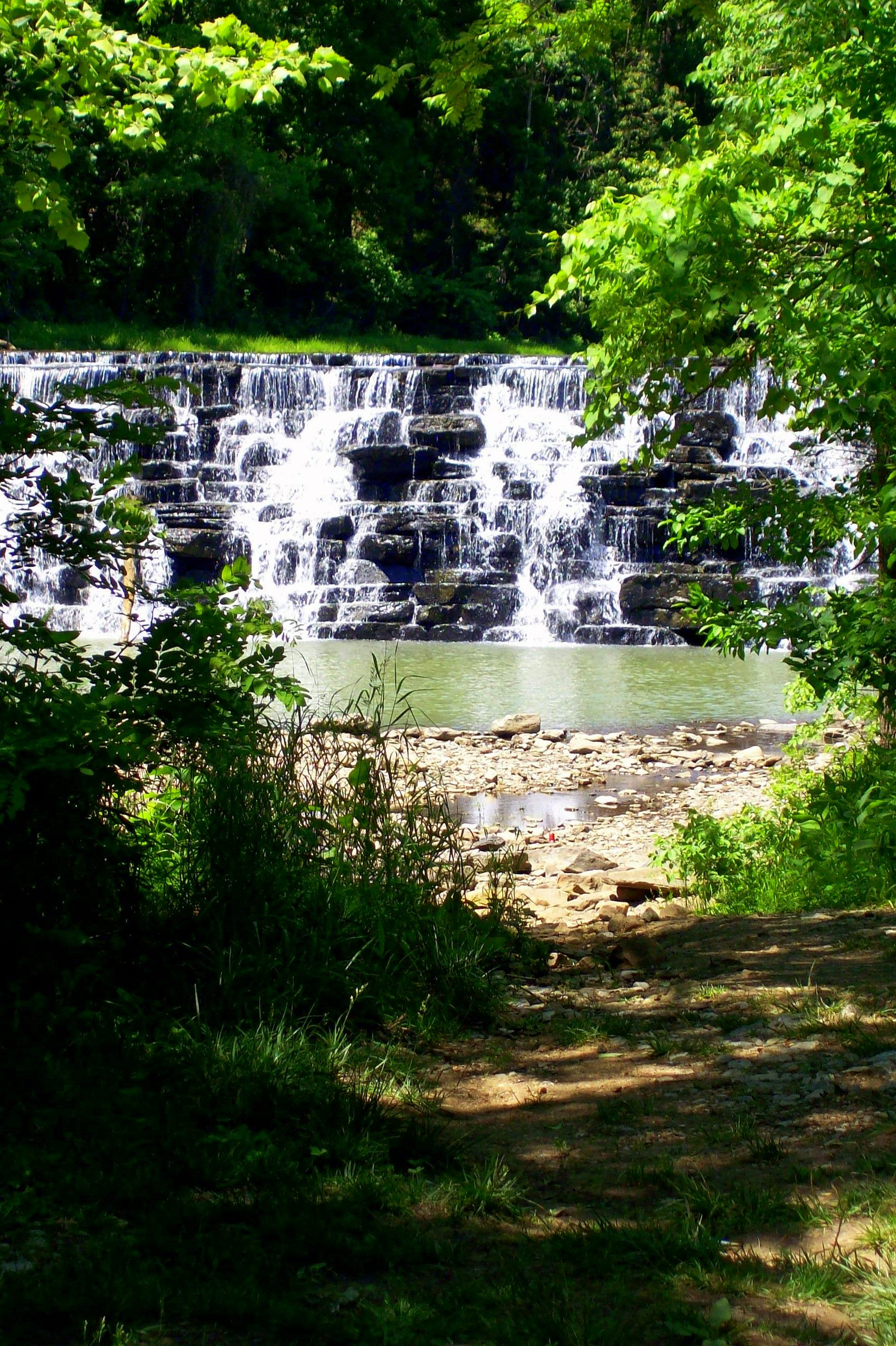
Waterfall at Devil's Den SP

Washington County contains three discontinuous segments of the Ozark National Forest, two state parks, two Wildlife Management Areas (WMAs) under Arkansas Game and Fish Commission jurisdiction, the Garrett Hollow Natural Area, and dozens of city parks.

The Wedington WMA is a hardwood forest owned by the United States Forest Service known for archery, deer hunting, fishing, and boating on Lake Wedington. The southeast corner of Washington County contains part of the White Rock WMA, an expansive section of the Ozark National Forest containing some of the steepest segments of the Boston Mountains covered in a mix of shortleaf pine and hardwood forest. White Rock WMA has six camping areas, four lakes, and numerous trails. Public hunting for squirrels, deer, wild turkeys, and black bear is available during certain seasons

Devil's Den State Park in southern Washington County is known for its picturesque views and mountain vistas. Prairie Grove Battlefield State Park was the site of the Battle of Prairie Grove, fought December 7, 1862, in the American Civil War. The park offers tours of the battlefield and period structures and contains the Hindman Museum, which preserves artifacts and interprets the history of the battle. Arkansas's largest Civil War battle reenactment takes place on t he battlefield in December of even numbered years.

== Demographics ==
Historical population
Census	Pop.	Note	%±
1830	2,182		—
1840	7,148		227.6%
1850	9,970		39.5%
1860	14,673		47.2%
1870	17,266		17.7%
1880	23,844		38.1%
1890	32,024		34.3%
1900	34,256		7.0%
1910	33,889		−1.1%
1920	35,468		4.7%
1930	39,255		10.7%
1940	41,114		4.7%
1950	49,979		21.6%
1960	55,797		11.6%
1970	77,370		38.7%
1980	100,494		29.9%
1990	113,409		12.9%
2000	157,715		39.1%
2010	203,065		28.8%
2020	245,871		21.1%
2025 (est.)	271,213	▲	10.3%
U.S. Decennial Census; 1790–1960 1900–1990; 1990–2000 2010–2019 2020

=== Racial and ethnic composition ===
Washington County, Arkansas – Racial and ethnic composition Note: the US Census treats Hispanic/Latino as an ethnic category. This table excludes Latinos from the racial categories and assigns them to a separate category. Hispanics/Latinos may be of any race.
Race / Ethnicity (NH = Non-Hispanic)	Pop 2000	Pop 2010	Pop 2020	% 2000	% 2010	% 2020
White alone (NH)	133,368	150,546	160,566	84.56%	74.14%	65.30%
Black or African American alone (NH)	3,408	5,828	8,330	2.16%	2.87%	3.39%
Native American or Alaska Native alone (NH)	1,839	2,154	2,443	1.17%	1.06%	0.99%
Asian alone (NH)	2,396	4,372	5,631	1.52%	2.15%	2.29%
Pacific Islander or Native Hawaiian alone (NH)	820	4,100	8,734	0.52%	2.02%	3.55%
Other race alone (NH)	114	227	729	0.07%	0.11%	0.30%
Mixed race or Multiracial (NH)	2,838	4,380	14,683	1.80%	2.16%	5.97%
Hispanic or Latino (any race)	12,932	31,458	44,755	8.20%	15.49%	18.20%
Total	157,715	203,065	245,871	100.00%	100.00%	100.00%

=== 2020 census ===
As of the 2020 census, the county had a population of 245,871. The median age was 32.0 years. 23.7% of residents were under the age of 18 and 12.1% of residents were 65 years of age or older. For every 100 females there were 98.7 males, and for every 100 females age 18 and over there were 96.5 males age 18 and over.

The racial makeup of the county was 68.5% White, 3.5% Black or African American, 1.5% American Indian and Alaska Native, 2.3% Asian, 3.6% Native Hawaiian and Pacific Islander, 10.2% from some other race, and 10.5% from two or more races. Hispanic or Latino residents of any race comprised 18.2% of the population.

76.0% of residents lived in urban areas, while 24.0% lived in rural areas.

There were 92,548 households in the county, of which 31.7% had children under the age of 18 living in them. Of all households, 44.5% were married-couple households, 21.0% were households with a male householder and no spouse or partner present, and 26.5% were households with a female householder and no spouse or partner present. About 27.9% of all households were made up of individuals and 8.1% had someone living alone who was 65 years of age or older.

There were 100,508 housing units, of which 7.9% were vacant. Among occupied housing units, 53.8% were owner-occupied and 46.2% were renter-occupied. The homeowner vacancy rate was 1.5% and the rental vacancy rate was 7.1%.

=== 2010 census ===
As of the 2010 United States census, there were 203,065 people, 76,389 households, and 48,059 families residing in the county. The population density was 213 inhabitants per square mile (82/km^{2}). There were 87,808 housing units at an average density of 92 per square mile (36/km^{2}). The racial makeup of the county was 79.9% White, 3.0% Black or African American, 1.2% Native American, 2.2% Asian, 2.0% Pacific Islander, 8.9% from other races, and 2.8% from two or more races. 15.5% of the population were Hispanic or Latino of any race.

There were 76,389 households, out of which 30.9% had children under the age of 18 living with them, 47.4% were married couples living together, 10.6% had a female householder with no husband present, and 37.1% were non-families. 27.5% of all households were made up of individuals, and 6.9% had someone living alone who was 65 years of age or older. The average household size was 2.56 and the average family size was 3.18.

In the county, the population was spread out, with 25.4% under the age of 18, 14.9% from 18 to 24, 28.5% from 25 to 44, 21.5% from 45 to 64, and 9.7% who were 65 years of age or older. The median age was 30.7 years. For every 100 females, there were 99.9 males. For every 100 females age 18 and over, there were 98.1 males.

The median income for a household in the county was $42,303, and the median income for a family was $52,300. Males had a median income of $37,430 versus $28,990 for females. The per capita income for the county was $22,421. About 12.1% of families and 17.9% of the population were below the poverty line, including 23.5% of those under age 18 and 9.5% of those age 65 or over.

=== 2000 census ===
As of the 2000 United States census, there were 157,715 people, 60,151 households, and 39,459 families residing in the county. The population density was 166 inhabitants per square mile (64/km^{2}). There were 64,330 housing units at an average density of 68 per square mile (26/km^{2}). The racial makeup of the county was 88.00% White, 2.24% Black or African American, 1.25% Native American, 1.54% Asian, 0.53% Pacific Islander, 4.26% from other races, and 2.17% from two or more races. 8.20% of the population were Hispanic or Latino of any race.

There were 60,151 households, out of which 32.50% had children under the age of 18 living with them, 52.30% were married couples living together, 9.40% had a female householder with no husband present, and 34.40% were non-families. 25.80% of all households were made up of individuals, and 7.10% had someone living alone who was 65 years of age or older. The average household size was 2.52 and the average family size was 3.07.

In the county, the population was spread out, with 25.00% under the age of 18, 15.30% from 18 to 24, 30.20% from 25 to 44, 19.50% from 45 to 64, and 9.90% who were 65 years of age or older. The median age was 31 years. For every 100 females, there were 100.40 males. For every 100 females age 18 and over, there were 98.70 males.

The median income for a household in the county was $34,691, and the median income for a family was $42,795. Males had a median income of $29,428 versus $21,769 for females. The per capita income for the county was $17,347. About 9.40% of families and 14.60% of the population were below the poverty line, including 16.50% of those under age 18 and 10.20% of those age 65 or over.

=== 2023 American Community Survey 5-Year Estimates ===
The United States Census Bureau also conducts estimated annual counts based on sampling for all jurisdictions. Due to the margin of error, it is not directly comparable to the decennial census.

Racial Makeup of Washington County, Arkansas (2023): 1. White alone (67.2%); 2. Black alone (3.18%); 3. Native American alone (1.04%); 4. Asian alone (2.40%); 5. Pacific Islander alone (2.71%); 6. Other race (5.47%); 7. Multiracial (18.0%)	Racial Makeup of Washington County, Arkansas treating Hispanics as a Racial Category (2023); NH=Non-Hispanic: 1. White NH (62.7%); 2. Black NH (3.14%); 3. Native American NH (0.51%); 4. Asian NH (2.34%); 5. Pacific Islander NH (2.71%); 6. Other race NH (0.37%); 7. Multiracial NH (9.85%); 8. Hispanic Any Race (18.4%)	Racial Makeup of Hispanics in Washington County, Arkansas (2023): 1. White alone (24.5%); 2. Black alone (0.23%); 3. Native American alone (2.92%); 4. Asian alone (0.29%); 5. Pacific Islander alone (0.01%); 6. Other race alone (27.8%); 7. Multiracial (44.2%)

== Human resources ==
=== Education ===
Washington County has historically been known as a center for education in Arkansas. Cane Hill College in Canehill was the first college in Arkansas, prior to the University of Arkansas's founding in 1871.

A 2012 study found 84.2% of Washington County residents over age 25 held a high school degree or higher and 31.9% held a bachelor's degree or higher. The Washington County high school rates are similar to state and national averages of 84.8% and 86.7%, respectively. The bachelor's degree rate is the second-highest of any county in Arkansas (statewide average of 21.1%, only behind Pulaski County's 33.7%), but only slightly above the national averages of 29.8%.

==== Primary and secondary education ====
School districts include:

- Elkins School District, serving nearly 1,400 students; includes Elkins High School in Elkins.
- Farmington School District, serving over 3,000 students; includes Farmington High School in Farmington.
- Fayetteville School District, serving over 10,100 students; includes Fayetteville High School in Fayetteville.
- Greenland School District, serving over 660 students; includes Greenland High School in Greenland. In 2004, the Winslow School District consolidated into the Greenland School District, with Winslow High School closing in 2005 and Winslow Elementary closing in 2007.
- Lincoln Consolidated School District, serving over 1,000 students; includes Lincoln High School in Lincoln.
- Prairie Grove School District, serving nearly 2,100 students; includes Prairie Grove High School in Prairie Grove.
- Springdale School District, serving over 21,000 students; includes Har-ber High School and Springdale High School in Springdale.
- West Fork School District, serving over 700 students; includes West Fork High School in West Fork.

Private schools:

- Haas Hall Academy with campuses in Fayetteville and Springdale.
- Ozark Catholic Academy in Tontitown
- Ozark Montessori Academy Springdale

==== Higher education ====
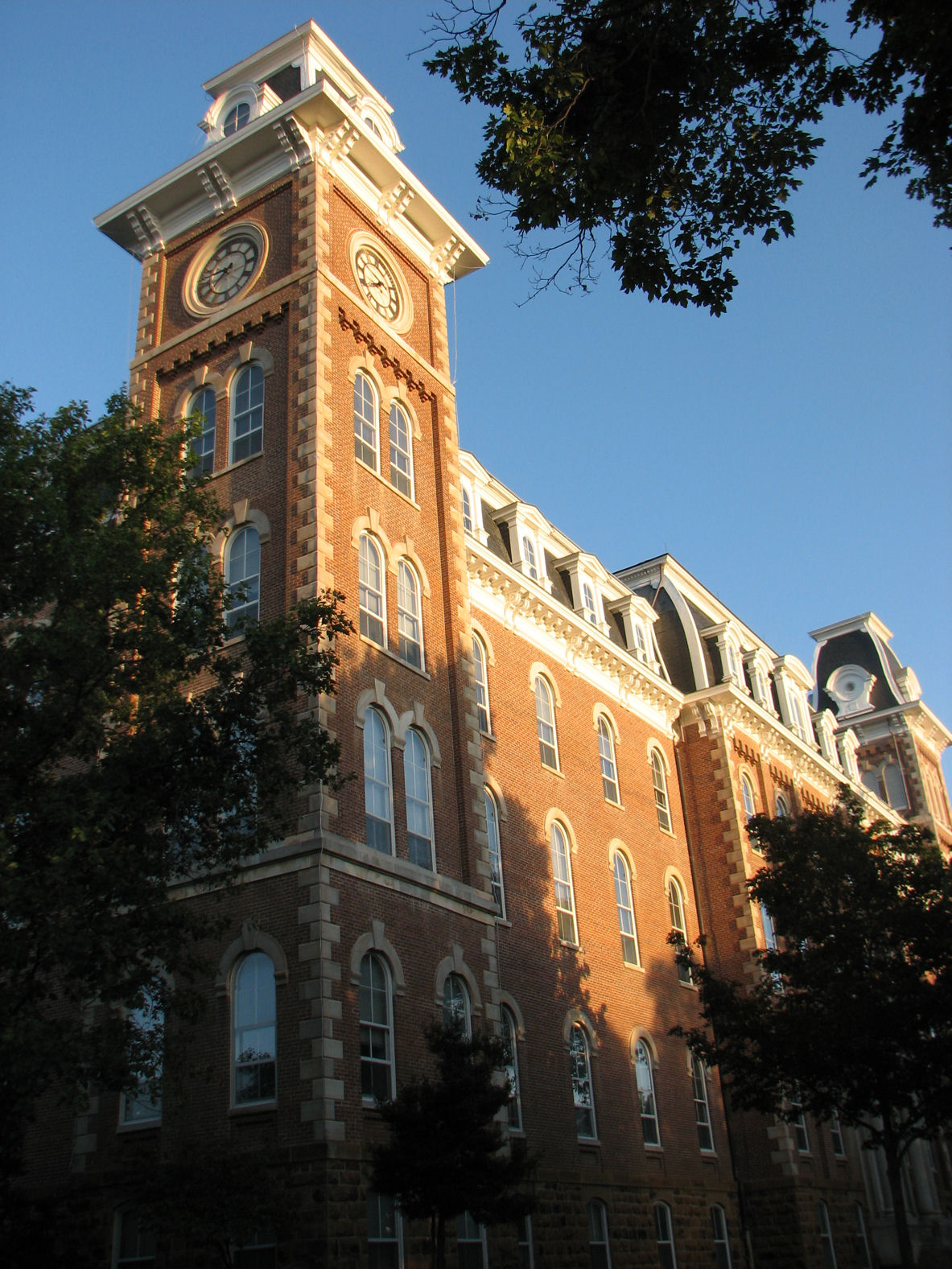
Old Main on the University of Arkansas campus.

The University of Arkansas at Fayetteville was founded in 1871 on the site of a hilltop farm that overlooked the Ozark Mountains, giving it the nickname "The Hill". It is the largest institution of higher learning in the state, with a fall 2019 undergraduate enrollment of 23,025 making UA three times larger than the next-largest institutions. Of the six undergraduate academic units, the largest is J. William Fulbright College of Arts and Sciences, followed by the Sam M. Walton College of Business and the College of Education and Health Professions. Enrollment increased 50% following the Campaign for the 21st Century, with much of the growth coming from out-of-state students. As a result, out-of-state students have a significant influence on the Washington County demographics and economy.

The Northwest Arkansas Community College opened a campus in Springdale in 2019.

==== Library system ====
Washington County is home to the Fayetteville Public Library and the Washington County Library System (WCLS). The WCLS consists of eight branch libraries, including the Springdale Public Library and seven branches in smaller cities across the county. The libraries offers books, e-books, media, reference, youth, business and genealogy services.

=== Public health ===
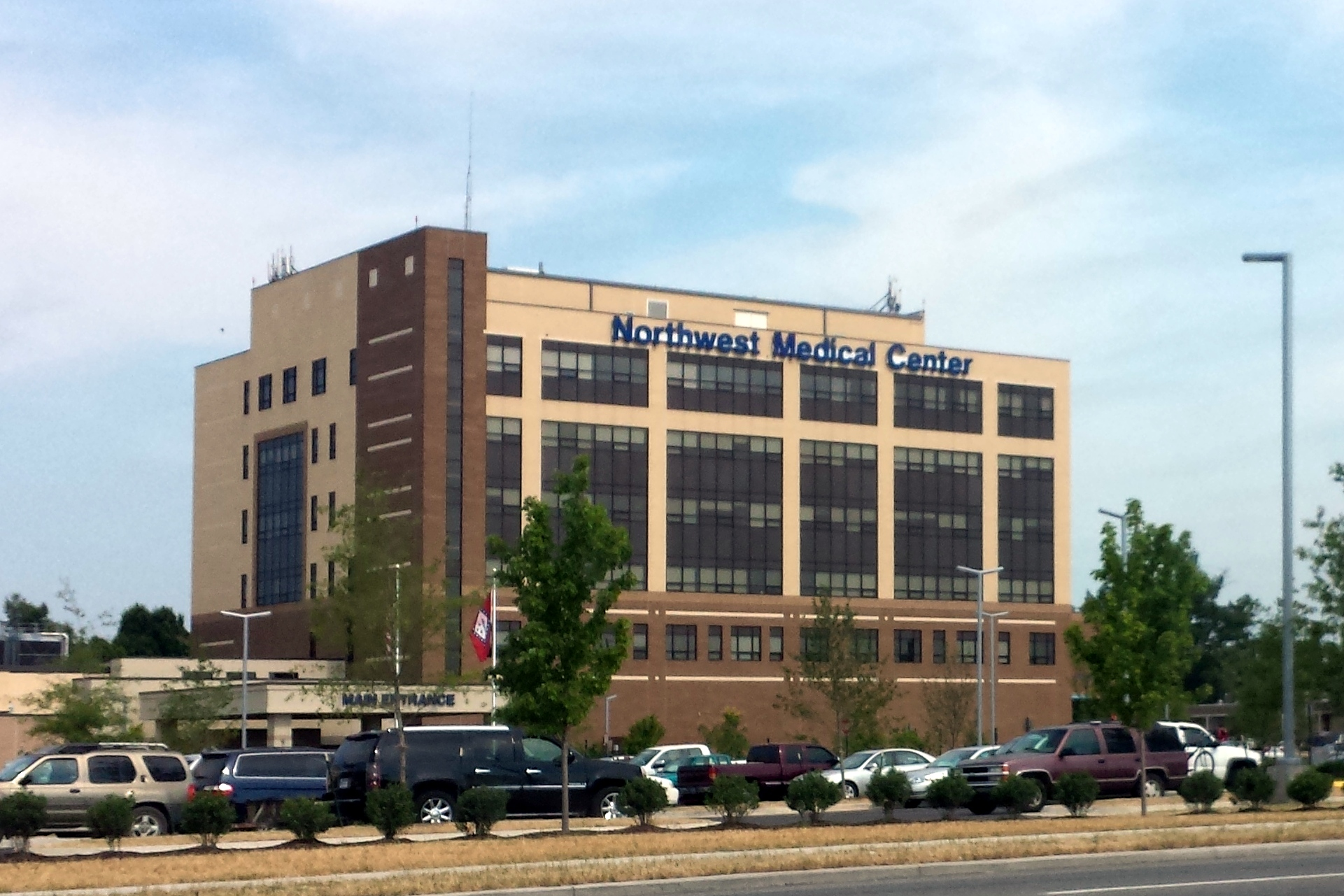
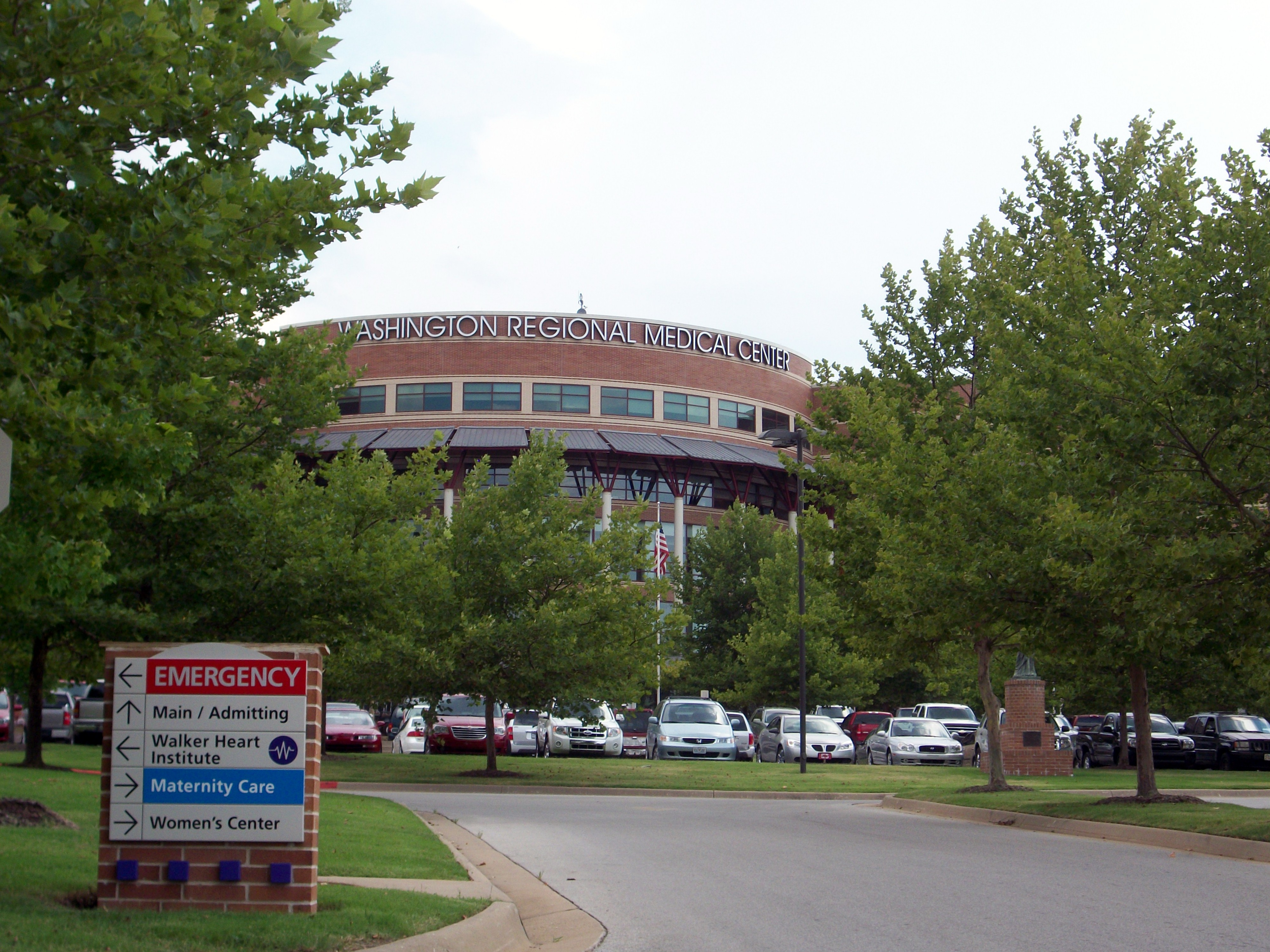
Left: Northwest Medical Center in Springdale, Right: Washington Regional Medical Center in Fayetteville
- Arkansas Children's Northwest Hospital
- Encompass Health Rehabilitation Hospital
- Mercy Hospital Northwest Arkansas
- Northwest Medical Center
  - Behavior Health Unit
  - Emergency Department
  - Willow Creek Women's Hospital
  - Physicians' Specialty Hospital
- Parkhill The Clinic for Women
- Regency Hospital
- Springwoods Behavioral Health Hospital
- Vantage Point Behavioral Health Hospital
- Veterans Health Care System of the Ozarks
- Washington Regional Medical Center

=== Public safety ===
The Washington County Sheriff's Office is the primary law enforcement agency in the county. The agency is led by the Washington County Sheriff, an official elected by countywide vote every four years. Ten municipalities have police departments providing law enforcement in their respective jurisdictions; Goshen, Tontitown, and Winslow contract with the Washington County Sheriff's Office for law enforcement services. All municipalities contract with the Washington County Sheriff's Office for incarceration at the Washington County Detention Center in Fayetteville. The University of Arkansas Police Department provides law enforcement on the campus of the University of Arkansas in close cooperation with the Fayetteville PD.

The county is under the jurisdiction of the Washington County District Court, a state district court. State district courts in Arkansas are courts of original jurisdiction for misdemeanors offenses and civil, small claims, and traffic matters. Local district courts are presided over by full-time judges in countywide elections.

Superseding district court jurisdiction is the 4th Judicial Circuit Court, which covers Washington and Madison counties. The 4th Circuit contains seven circuit judges, elected to six-year terms circuitwide.

== Culture and contemporary life ==
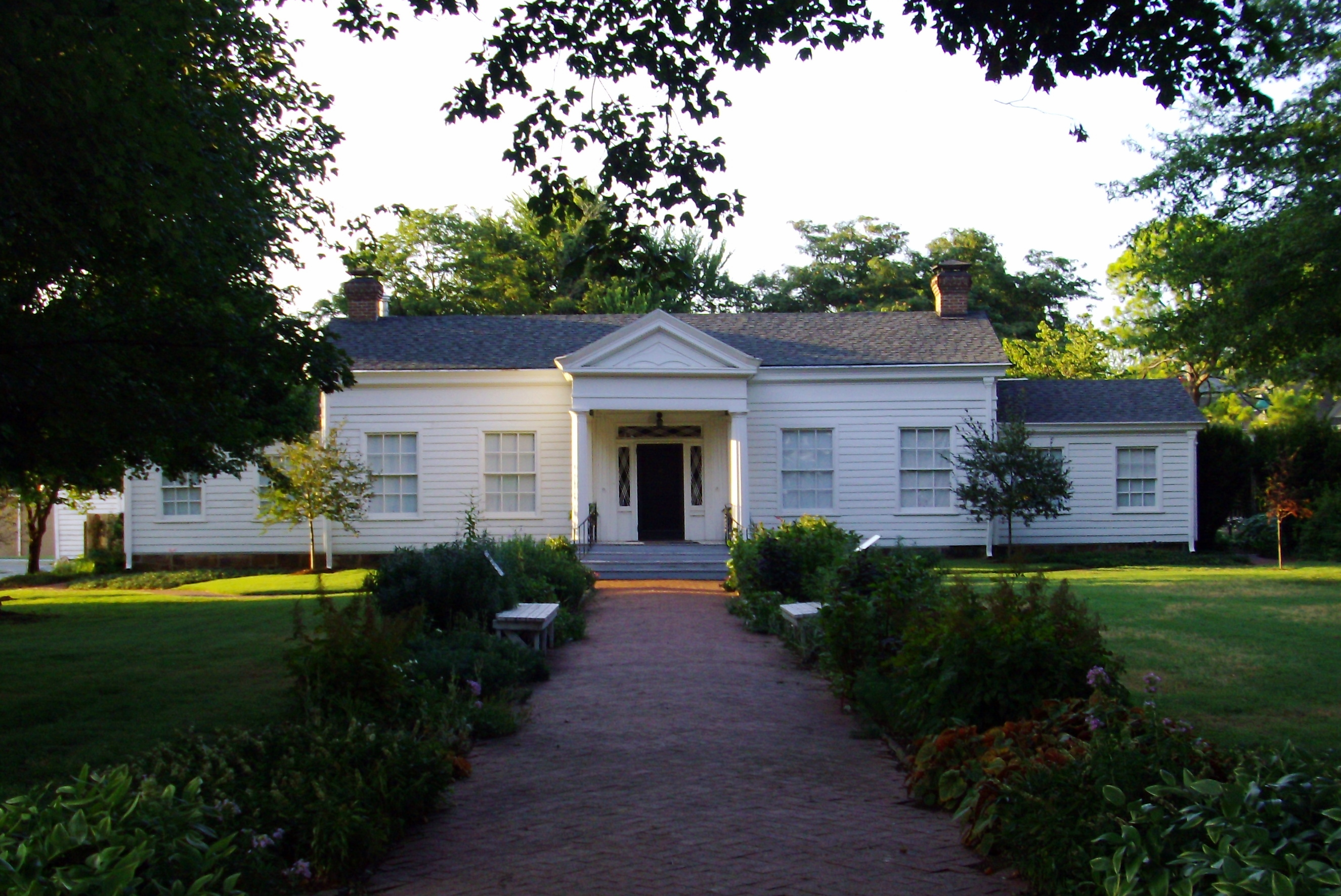
Washington County Historical Museum in Fayetteville

Washington County has several facilities, monuments, and museums dedicated to preserving the history and culture of the area. The Washington County Historical Museum, owned and operated by the Washington County Historical Society, preserves and interprets the history and culture of Washington County for visitors and residents. Regional history is maintained and taught through the Shiloh Museum of Ozark History in Springdale since 1968. The Clinton House Museum in Fayetteville is a historic house museum dedicated to the lives of Bill Clinton and Hillary Rodham while they both taught at the University of Arkansas School of Law and was where they married in 1975.

Over 100 properties are listed on the National Register of Historic Places in Washington County, ranging from historic districts (UA Campus, Washington-Willow, Dickson Street, Mock Street, Springdale Poultry Industry and others) to Civil War battlefields (Cane Hill Battlefield and Prairie Grove Battlefield Park), historic homes of area leaders (Gregg House, Stone House), community gathering places (Mineral Springs Community Building), and places of worship (Shiloh Church, United Presbyterian Church of Canehill).

=== Annual cultural events ===
Many cultural events take place in Washington County annually. Some of the largest include:

- Arkansas Razorbacks football games in fall, estimated to bring 156,765 visitors from outside Northwest Arkansas in 2018
- Walmart Shareholder's Meeting at Bud Walton Arena brings over 5,000 employees to Fayetteville from around the world.
- Battle of Prairie Grove Reenactment, hundreds of Civil War reenactors camp and fight at Prairie Grove Battlefield State Park in December of even-numbered years
- NWA Pride, the largest LGBTQ+ Pride event in the state held in Fayetteville every June.

== Government ==
The county government is a constitutional body granted specific powers by the Constitution of Arkansas and the Arkansas Code. The quorum court is the legislative branch of the county government and controls all spending and revenue collection. Representatives are called justices of the peace and are elected from county districts every even-numbered year. The number of districts in a county vary from nine to fifteen, and district boundaries are drawn by the county election commission. The Washington County Quorum Court has fifteen members. Presiding over quorum court meetings is the county judge, who serves as the chief operating officer of the county. The county judge is elected at-large and does not vote in quorum court business, although capable of vetoing quorum court decisions.

=== Current government ===
The current County Judge is Republican Patrick Deakins, who was elected to replace Judge Joseph Wood, who retired to run for Arkansas Lieutenant Governor. He defeated Democrat Josh Moody in the November 2022 election by 4.46%.

Washington County, Arkansas elected countywide officials
Position	Officeholder	Party
County Judge	Patrick Deakins	Republican
County Clerk	Becky Lewallen	Republican
Circuit Clerk	Kyle Sylvester	Republican
Sheriff	Jay Cantrell	Republican
Treasurer	Bobby Hill	Republican
Collector	Angela Wood	Republican
Assessor	Russell Hill	Republican
Coroner	Roger Morris	Democratic

The composition of the Quorum Court following the as of January 2, 2024 is 10 Republicans and 5 Democrats. Justices of the Peace (members) of the Quorum Court following the elections are:

District	Justice of the Peace	Party	First elected	District profile
1	Bradley Bruns	Republican	2024	Northern Washington County, including Johnson and Tontitown, and parts of Elm Springs, Fayetteville, and Springdale, along with the community of Harmon.
2	David Wilson	Republican	2022	Northern Washington County, including southwestern Springdale.
3	Robert Massingill	Republican	2024	Northern Washington County, including western parts of Springdale and eastern Elm Springs.
4	Vladimir Lopez	Democratic	2024	Northern Washington County, including downtown and eastern Springdale.
5	Kyle Lyons	Republican	2022	Northeastern Washington County, including Goshen and portions of Springdale, along with the communities of Beav-O-Rama, Blue Springs Village, Mayfield, Sonora, Spring Valley, and War Eagle Cove.
6	Lisa Ecke	Republican	2014	North-central Washington County, including southern Springdale.
7	Charles Dean	Republican	2022	West-central Washington County, including portions of Farmington and Fayetteville, along with the communities of Savoy and Wheeler.
8	Shawndra Washington	Democratic	2018	North-central Washington County, including northern portions of Fayetteville.
9	Beth Coger	Democratic	2022	North-central Washington County, including northern and eastern portions of Fayetteville.
10	Robert Dennis	Republican	2020	Central Washington County, including portions of Farmington, western Fayetteville, and northern Prairie Grove.
11	Suki Highers	Democratic	2018	Central Washington County, including portions of downtown Fayetteville; includes the University of Arkansas.
12	Evelyn Rios Stafford	Democratic	2020	Central Washington County, including portions of downtown and southern Fayetteville.
13	William Leming	Republican	2018	Western Washington County, including Lincoln and portions of Prairie Grove, along with the communities of Canehill, Cincinnati, Evansville, Morrow, Rhea, and Wedington.
14	Gary Ricker	Republican	2022	Central and southern Washington County, including Greenland, West Fork, Winslow, and southern portions of Fayetteville, along with the communities of Black Oak, Brentwood, Hogeye, Strickler, and Sunset; includes Devil's Den State Park.
15	Butch Pond	Republican	2002	Eastern Washington County, including Elkins and eastern portions of Fayetteville, along with the communities of Arnett, Durham, Hazel Valley, and Tuttle.

Additionally, the townships of Washington County are entitled to elect their own respective constables, as set forth by the Constitution of Arkansas. Constables are largely of historical significance as they were used to keep the peace in rural areas when travel was more difficult. The township constables as of the 2024 elections are:

- District 1: Tom G. Clowers (R)
- District 2: John M. Brooks (D)
- District 3: Kyle Woodruff (R)

=== Taxation ===
Property tax is assessed by the Washington County Assessor annually based upon the fair market value of the property and determining which tax rate, commonly called a millage in Arkansas, will apply. The rate depends upon the property's location with respect to city limits, school district, and special tax increment financing (TIF) districts. This tax is collected by the Washington County Collector between the first business day of March of each year through October 15 without penalty. The Washington County Treasurer disburses tax revenues to various government agencies, such as cities, county road departments, fire departments, libraries, and police departments in accordance with the budget set by the quorum court.

Sales and use taxes in Arkansas are voter approved and collected by the Arkansas Department of Finance and Administration. Arkansas's statewide sales and use tax has been 6.5% since July 1, 2013. Washington County has an additional sales and use tax of 1.25% since December 1, 2004. Within Washington County, Greenland and West Fork have 3.0% additional sales and use tax, Elkins, Prairie Grove, Tontitown have a rate of 2.75%, Farmington, Fayetteville, Johnson, Lincoln, and Springdale are at 2%, and Elm Springs and Goshen have tax rates of 1%. The Arkansas State Treasurer disburses tax revenue to counties/cities in accordance with tax rules.

== Politics ==
Only two Democrats have carried the county since 1964, Jimmy Carter in 1976 and Arkansas native (and for a time, Fayetteville resident) Bill Clinton in 1992 and 1996. However, Clinton only managed pluralities in both of his bids. Washington County has voted Republican during the past couple decades, and has largely bucked the Democratic trend in counties dominated by college towns. However, it is not nearly as Republican as other counties in western Arkansas. The Republican margin in the county has decreased since 2016. In 2012, voters supported Mitt Romney by giving him 56.3% of the vote compared to Barack Obama's 40.1% of the vote, a 16.2% difference. In 2016, Bill Clinton's wife, Hillary, picked up 40.8% of the vote while Donald Trump picked up 50.7% of the vote, a 9.9% difference, a sharp decrease in the Republican voters. In 2020, Joe Biden improved this by getting 46.5% of the vote while Trump got 50.4% of the vote, a 3.9% difference. Biden's 46.5% of the vote was the best for a Democrat in the county since Jimmy Carter in 1976, despite the fact Bill Clinton won it in both of his bids. In 2022, Washington County narrowly supported Democrat Chris Jones over Republican Sarah Huckabee Sanders for governor, and was the only county to flip from red to blue from 2018.

United States presidential election results for Washington County, Arkansas
Year	Republican		Democratic		Third party(ies)	
Year	No.	%	No.	%	No.	%
1892	1,871	40.57%	2,457	53.27%	284	6.16%
1896	1,197	26.93%	3,208	72.17%	40	0.90%
1900	1,347	32.60%	2,658	64.33%	127	3.07%
1904	1,369	38.72%	1,978	55.94%	189	5.35%
1908	1,704	36.19%	2,748	58.36%	257	5.46%
1912	565	18.01%	1,881	59.96%	691	22.03%
1916	1,625	35.74%	2,922	64.26%	0	0.00%
1920	2,118	43.41%	2,637	54.05%	124	2.54%
1924	1,466	35.90%	2,281	55.87%	336	8.23%
1928	3,132	56.26%	2,395	43.02%	40	0.72%
1932	1,502	22.77%	4,971	75.36%	123	1.86%
1936	1,579	31.73%	3,378	67.87%	20	0.40%
1940	1,819	38.29%	2,873	60.48%	58	1.22%
1944	3,084	49.73%	3,089	49.81%	28	0.45%
1948	2,859	40.42%	3,493	49.38%	722	10.21%
1952	8,650	63.55%	4,923	36.17%	38	0.28%
1956	7,683	60.87%	4,857	38.48%	83	0.66%
1960	10,088	64.34%	5,391	34.38%	200	1.28%
1964	6,856	40.16%	10,166	59.55%	48	0.28%
1968	10,640	48.67%	6,131	28.04%	5,092	23.29%
1972	17,523	70.94%	7,108	28.78%	70	0.28%
1976	14,132	47.37%	15,610	52.32%	92	0.31%
1980	20,788	58.69%	12,276	34.66%	2,357	6.65%
1984	24,993	68.10%	11,319	30.84%	386	1.05%
1988	23,601	64.38%	12,557	34.25%	500	1.36%
1992	20,292	42.38%	22,029	46.01%	5,559	11.61%
1996	19,476	44.30%	20,419	46.44%	4,072	9.26%
2000	28,231	54.86%	21,425	41.64%	1,803	3.50%
2004	35,726	55.73%	27,597	43.05%	780	1.22%
2008	37,963	55.52%	29,021	42.44%	1,396	2.04%
2012	39,688	56.33%	28,236	40.07%	2,536	3.60%
2016	41,476	50.67%	33,366	40.76%	7,019	8.57%
2020	47,504	50.39%	43,824	46.49%	2,938	3.12%
2024	50,243	51.71%	43,779	45.06%	3,136	3.23%

== Communities ==
=== Cities ===
- Elkins
- Elm Springs (partly in Benton County)
- Farmington
- Fayetteville (county seat)
- Goshen
- Greenland
- Johnson
- Lincoln
- Prairie Grove
- Springdale (partly in Benton County)
- Tontitown
- West Fork
- Winslow

=== Census-designated places ===
- Canehill
- Cincinnati
- Evansville
- Morrow
- Summers

=== Other unincorporated communities ===
- Appleby
- Arnett
- Baldwin
- Banyard
- Black Oak
- Blackburn
- Blue Springs Village
- Brentwood
- Clyde
- Durham
- Dutch Mills
- Fayette Junction
- Gulley
- Habberton
- Harmon
- Harris
- Hazel Valley
- Hogeye
- Hubbard
- Mayfield
- McNair
- Mount Olive
- Oak Grove
- Odell
- Onda
- Pilgrim's Rest
- Pitkin Corner
- Rhea
- Rochelle Riviera
- Savoy
- Shady Grove
- Skylight
- Sonora
- Spring Valley
- Starks
- Steele
- Strain
- Strickler
- Sulphur City
- Sunset
- Suttle
- Tolu
- Tuttle
- Viney Grove
- Walnut Grove
- War Eagle Cove
- Weddington
- Wedington Woods
- Wheeler
- White Rock
- Woolsey
- Wyman
- Wyola

=== Townships ===
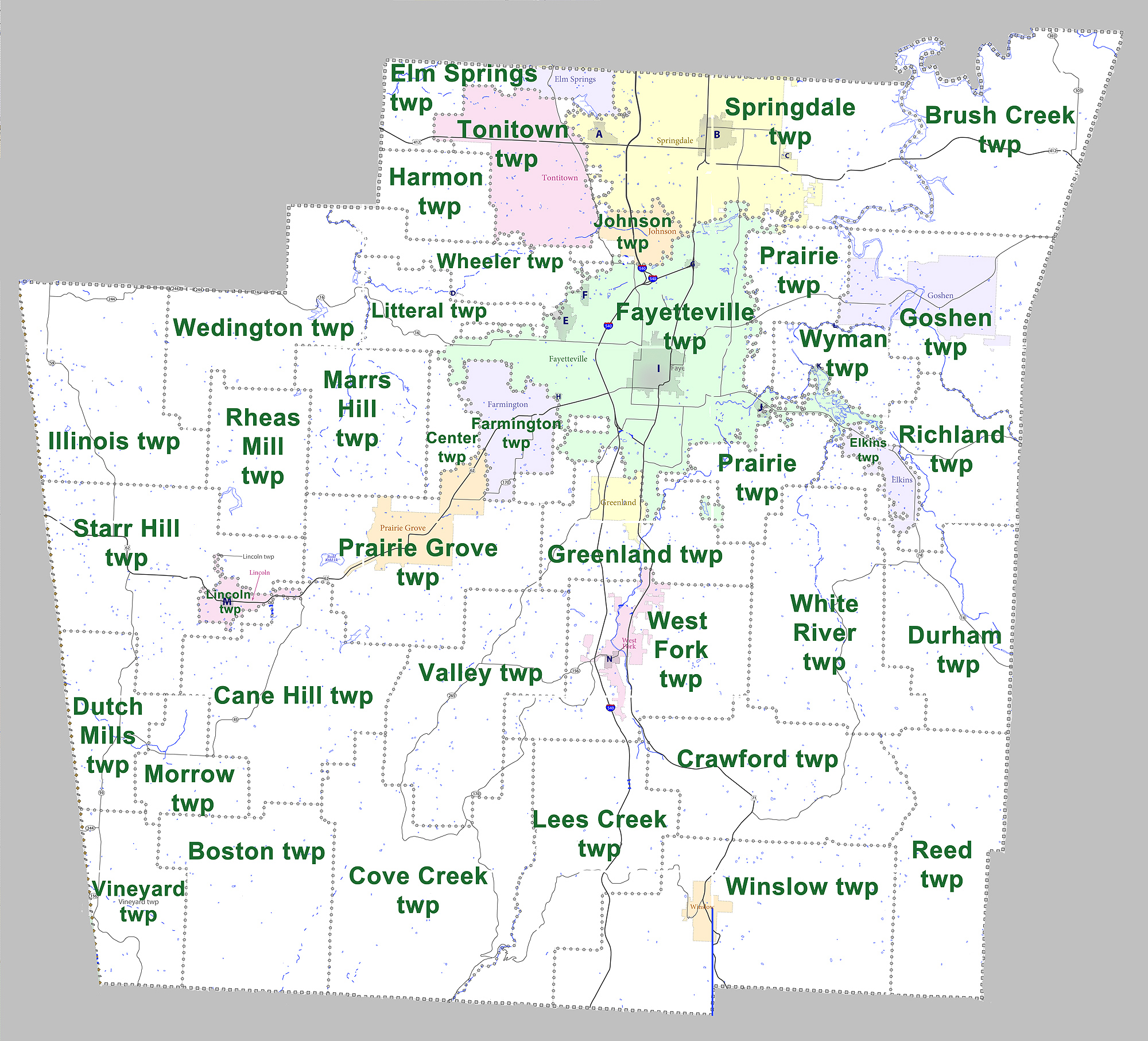
Townships in Washington County, Arkansas as of 2010

Townships in Arkansas are the divisions of a county. Each township includes unincorporated areas and some may have incorporated towns or cities within part of their space. Townships have limited purposes in modern times. However, they are of value for historical purposes in terms of genealogical research. Each town or city is within one or more townships in an Arkansas county based on census maps. The townships of Washington County are listed below. In Washington County, each incorporated town/city is at least partially located within its namesake township.

- Boston
- Brush Creek
- Cane Hill
- Center
- Cove Creek
- Crawford
- Durham
- Dutch Mills
- Elkins (Elkins)
- Elm Springs (Elm Springs)
- Farmington (Farmington)
- Fayetteville (Fayetteville)
- Goshen (Goshen)
- Greenland (Greenland)
- Harmon
- Illinois
- Johnson (Johnson)
- Lee's Creek
- Lincoln (Lincoln)
- Litteral
- Marrs Hill
- Morrow
- Prairie
- Prairie Grove (Prairie Grove)
- Reed
- Rhea's Mill
- Richland
- Springdale (most of Springdale)
- Starr Hill
- Tontitown (Tontitown)
- Valley
- Vineyard
- Wedington
- West Fork (West Fork)
- White River
- Winslow (Winslow)
- Wyman

== Infrastructure ==
=== Major highways ===
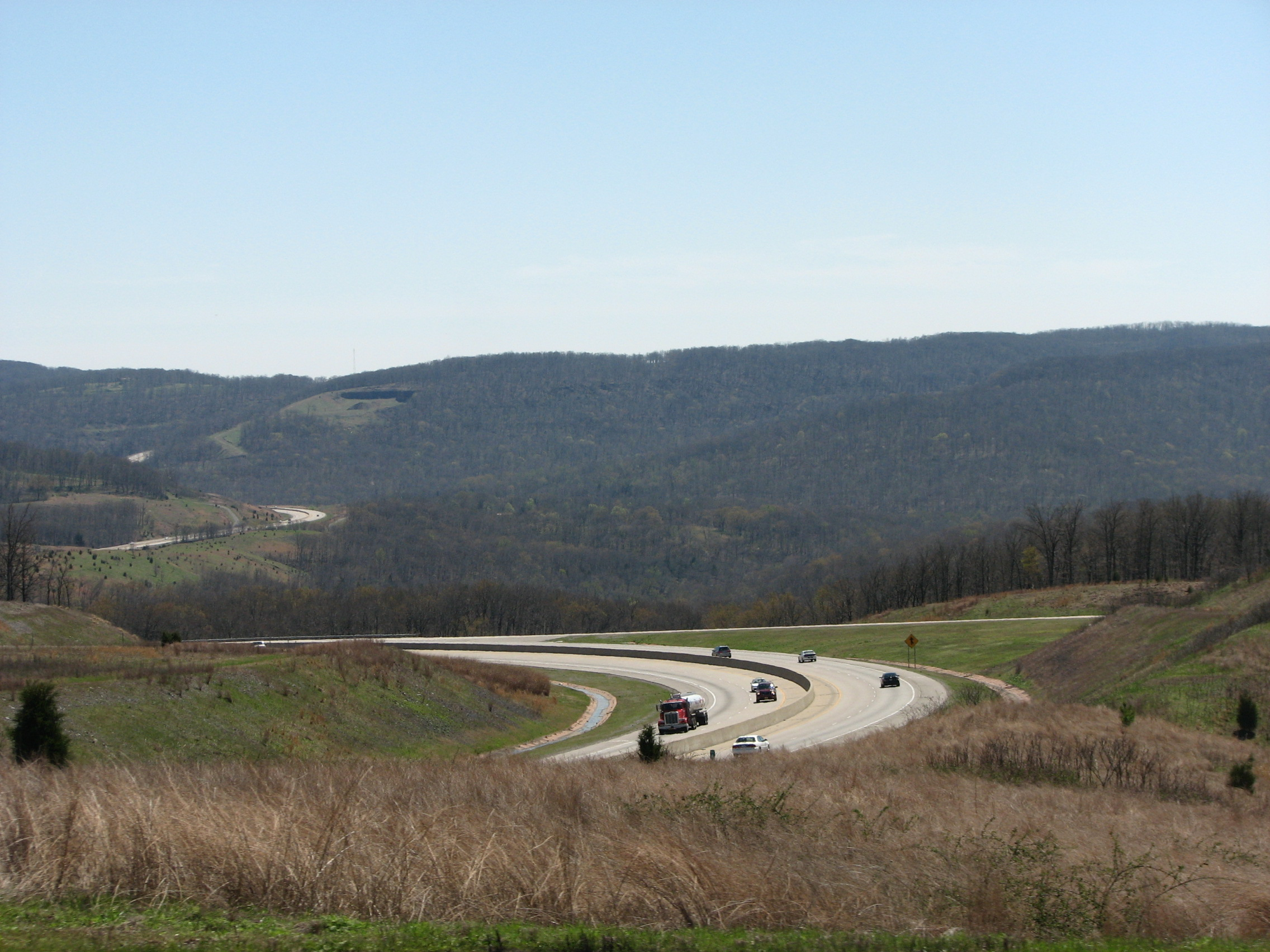
Interstate 49 enters the Boston Mountains in south Washington County

Washington County has contained the Ozark Trail, Trail of Tears, and the Butterfield Overland Mail route. Today, Interstate 49 serves as the county's main thoroughfare, and connects the University of Arkansas with Fort Smith and Interstate 40 to the south and other NWA cities to the north. Future plans call for Interstate 49 to be extended to ultimately connect New Orleans, Louisiana with Kansas City, Missouri through Washington County.

- Interstate 42
- Interstate 49
- U.S. Route 62
- U.S. Route 71
  - U.S. Route 71B
- U.S. Route 412
- Highway 16
- Highway 45
- Highway 59
- Highway 74
- Highway 112
- Highway 156
- Highway 170
- Highway 180
- Highway 220
- Highway 244
- Highway 265
- Highway 303

=== Transit ===
- Jefferson Lines
- Ozark Regional Transit
- Razorback Transit

=== Utilities ===
The Arkansas Department of Health is responsible for the regulation and oversight of public water systems throughout the state. Washington County contains twelve community water systems, including two of the largest distribution systems in the state: the City of Fayetteville (retail population served of 94,000) and Springdale Water Utilities (SWU, 87,618) Both water systems purchase all potable water from Beaver Water District. Many of the smaller cities in Washington County purchase water from Fayetteville, SWU, Benton-Washington Regional Public Water Authority (PWA, colloquially "Two-Ton") or Washington Water Authority (WWA), including Elkins, Lincoln, Tontitown, West Fork, and Winslow.

== See also ==
- Arkansas Highway 156 (1973–1981), former state highway in Washington County
- List of counties in Arkansas
- List of lakes in Washington County, Arkansas
- List of places named for George Washington
- National Register of Historic Places listings in Washington County, Arkansas
