= Crawford Township, Washington County, Arkansas =

Township of Crawford
- Township
- Location of Crawford Township in Washington County

- Location of Washington County in Arkansas
- Coordinates: 35°52′25″N 94°06′46″W
- Country: United States
- State: Arkansas
- County: Washington
- Established: 1878

Area
  - Total: 23.8 sq mi (62 km^{2})
  - Land: 23.8 sq mi (62 km^{2})
  - Water: 0.0 sq mi (0 km^{2}) 0%
- Elevation: 1,834 ft (559 m)

Population (2000)
  - Total: 800
  - Density: 34/sq mi (13/km^{2})
- Time zone: UTC-6 (CST)
  - Summer (DST): UTC-5 (CDT)
- Area code: 479
- GNIS feature ID: 69784

Township of Crawford is one of 37 townships in Washington County, Arkansas, United States. As of the 2000 census, its total population was 800.

== Geography ==
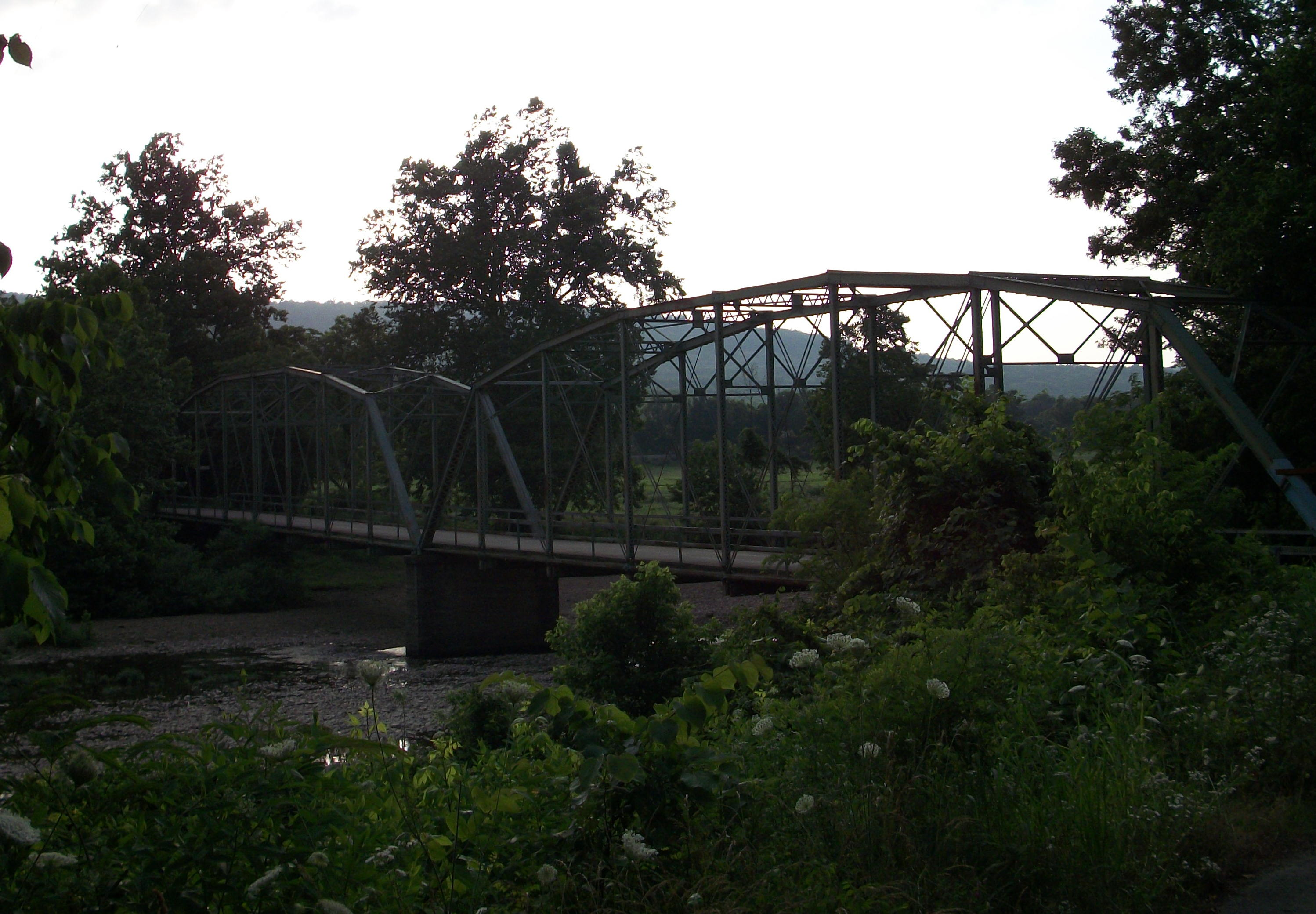
Crawford Twp. contains the Woolsey Bridge, which carries Washington CR 35 over the West Fork of the White River near the historic location of Woolsey, Arkansas.

According to the United States Census Bureau, Crawford Township covers an area of 23.8 square miles (62 km^{2}); all land. Crawford Township was created in 1878 from part of West Fork Township. It gave part to Lee's Creek Township in 1880.

=== Cities, towns, villages ===
- Brentwood
- Woolsey
- Wyola

=== Cemeteries ===
The township contains Woolsey Cemetery.

=== Major routes ===
- U.S. Route 71
- Arkansas Highway 74
