= Arnett, West Virginia =

Unincorporated community in West Virginia, United States

- Unincorporated community
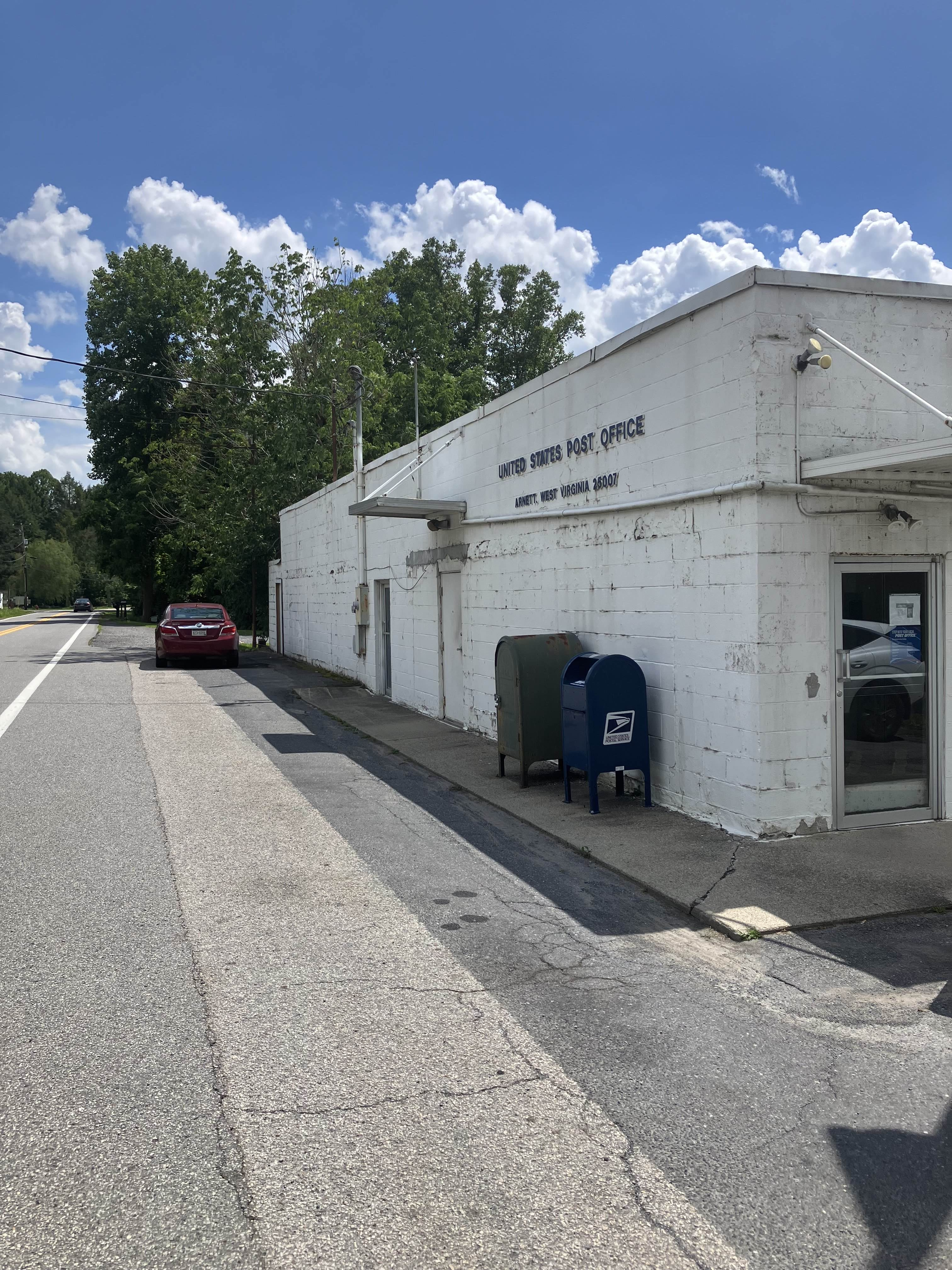
- Post office in Arnett, West Virginia

- Location within West Virginia and the United States Arnett, West Virginia (the United States)
- Coordinates: 37°50′00″N 81°25′48″W
- Country: United States
- State: West Virginia
- County: Raleigh
- Elevation: 1,555 ft (474 m)
- Time zone: UTC-5 (Eastern (EST))
  - Summer (DST): UTC-4 (EDT)
- ZIP code: 25007
- Area codes: 304 & 681
- GNIS feature ID: 1553746

Arnett is an unincorporated community in Raleigh County, West Virginia, United States. Arnett is located on West Virginia Route 3, 14 miles (23 km) west-northwest of Beckley. Arnett has a post office with ZIP code 25007.

An early variant name was Vista.
