= Boston Township, Washington County, Arkansas =

Township of Boston
- Township
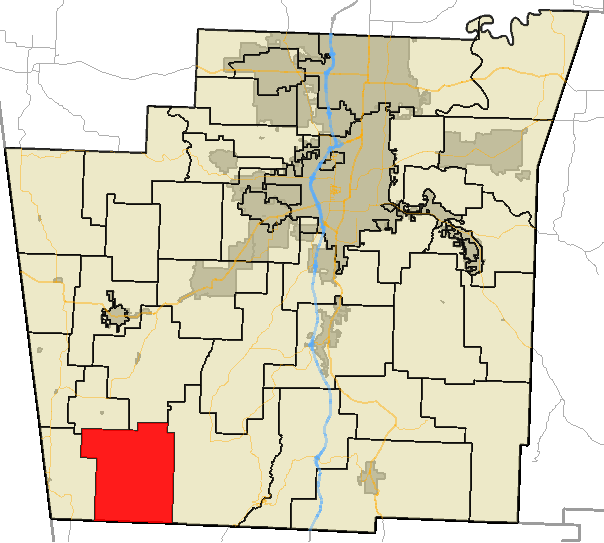
- Boston Township in Washington county, Arkansas
- Coordinates: 35°48′45″N 94°23′15″W
- Country: United States
- State: Arkansas
- County: Washington
- Established: 1838

Area
  - Total: 31.6 sq mi (82 km^{2})
  - Land: 31.5 sq mi (82 km^{2})
  - Water: 0.1 sq mi (0.26 km^{2})
- Elevation: 1,660 ft (510 m)

Population (2010)
  - Total: 392
  - Density: 12.4/sq mi (4.8/km^{2})
- Time zone: UTC-6 (CST)
  - Summer (DST): UTC-5 (CDT)
- Area code: 479
- GNIS feature ID: 69779

Boston Township is one of 37 townships in Washington County, Arkansas, USA. As of the 2010 census, its unincorporated population was 392.

== Geography ==
According to the United States Census Bureau, Boston Township covers an area of 31.6 square miles (82 km^{2}) with 31.5 square miles (82 km^{2}) of it land and 0.1 square miles (0.26 km^{2}) of it water.

=== Cities, towns, villages ===
- Odell
- Skylight

=== Cemeteries ===
The township contains Dobbs Cemetery and Garrett Creek Cemetery.

=== Major routes ===
The township does not contain any state highways.
