= Arnett, Hockley County, Texas =

Unincorporated community in Texas, US

Arnett
- Unincorporated community
- Location in Texas
- Coordinates: 33.4925919°N 102.2918455°W
- Country: United States
- State: Texas
- County: Hockley
- Elevation: 3,468 ft (1,057 m)

Arnett is an unincorporated community in Hockley County, Texas, United States. Situated on Farm to Market Road 1585, it was founded in 1926 and named for Tom Arnett, a foreman of nearby Spade Ranch. The town peaked in the 1940s, with a population of 100, but declined following World War II, and as of 2000, had 10 residents.
