= Reed Township, Washington County, Arkansas =

Township of Reed
- Township
- Location of Reed Township in Washington County

- Location of Washington County in Arkansas
- Coordinates: 35°50′5″N 94°00′16″W
- Country: United States
- State: Arkansas
- County: Washington
- Established: 1880

Area
  - Total: 39.4 sq mi (102 km^{2})
  - Land: 39.4 sq mi (102 km^{2})
  - Water: 0.0 sq mi (0 km^{2})
- Elevation: 2,356 ft (718 m)

Population (2000)
  - Total: 410
  - Density: 10/sq mi (3.9/km^{2})
- Time zone: UTC-6 (CST)
  - Summer (DST): UTC-5 (CDT)
- Area code: 479
- GNIS feature ID: 69800

Reed Township is one of thirty-seven townships in Washington County, Arkansas, USA. As of the 2000 census, its total population was 410.

Reed Township was established in 1880.

== Geography ==
According to the United States Census Bureau, Reed Township covers an area of 34.9 square miles (90 km^{2}), all land.

The township was created from White River Township in 1880.

=== Cities, towns, villages ===
- Hazel Valley
- Porter's Store (historical)
- Sunset

=== Cemeteries ===
The township contains Temple Hill Cemetery and Terry Cemetery; along with Hazel Valley Cemetery, and Nickell Cemetery.

=== Major routes ===
The township contains no state highways.
