= Crawford Township, Cherokee County, Kansas =

- Township
- Location within Cherokee County

- Location within the state of Kansas
- Coordinates: 37°09′50″N 094°46′51″W
- Country: United States
- State: Kansas
- County: Cherokee

Area
  - Total: 36.46 sq mi (94.43 km^{2})
  - Land: 36.4 sq mi (94.2 km^{2})
  - Water: 0.089 sq mi (0.23 km^{2}) 0.24%
- Elevation: 948 ft (289 m)

Population (2020)
  - Total: 579
  - Density: 15.9/sq mi (6.15/km^{2})
- Time zone: UTC-6 (CST)
  - Summer (DST): UTC-5 (CDT)
- Area code: 620
- FIPS code: 20-16225
- GNIS ID: 469371

Crawford Township is a township in Cherokee County, Kansas, United States. As of the 2020 census, its population was 579.

== Geography ==
Crawford Township covers an area of 36.46 square miles (94.4 km^{2}) and contains no incorporated settlements. According to the USGS, it contains five cemeteries: Bethlehem, Columbus, County Home, Park and Timberhill Oak Hill.
