= West Fork Township, Washington County, Arkansas =

Inactive township in Washington County, Arkansas

Coordinates: 35.924°N 94.169°W

West Fork Township is an inactive township in Washington County, Arkansas, United States.

West Fork Township was established in 1880.
