= Crawford Township, Crawford County, Kansas =

Crawford Township
- Township
- Location in Crawford County
- Coordinates: 37°31′32″N 094°50′03″W
- Country: United States
- State: Kansas
- County: Crawford

Area
  - Total: 61.61 sq mi (159.58 km^{2})
  - Land: 61.56 sq mi (159.45 km^{2})
  - Water: 0.054 sq mi (0.14 km^{2}) 0.09%
- Elevation: 980 ft (300 m)

Population (2020)
  - Total: 1,042
  - Density: 16.93/sq mi (6.535/km^{2})
- GNIS feature ID: 0469730

Crawford Township is a township in Crawford County, Kansas, United States. As of the 2020 census, its population was 1,042.

== Geography ==
Crawford Township covers an area of 61.62 square miles (159.6 km^{2}) surrounding the city of Girard. According to the USGS, it contains one cemetery, Girard.

The streams of Clear Creek and Elm Creek run through this township.

== Transportation ==
Crawford Township contains one airport or landing strip, Harport Landing Field.
