= Arnett, Arkansas =

- Unincorporated community
- Arnett's position in Arkansas. Arnett, Arkansas (the United States)
- Coordinates: 35°53′42″N 94°02′23″W
- Country: United States
- State: Arkansas
- County: Washington
- Township: White River
- Elevation: 1,457 ft (444 m)
- Time zone: UTC-6 (Central (CST))
  - Summer (DST): UTC-5 (CDT)
- Area code: 479
- GNIS feature ID: 57281

Arnett is an unincorporated community in White River Township, Washington County, Arkansas, United States. It is located on Arkansas Highway 74.

A post office called Arnett was established in 1883, and remained in operation until 1951. The community has the name of its first postmaster, Luke Arnett.

== Geography ==
Arnett's coordinates are:35°53′42″N 94°02′23″W[1], while the average elevation of the place is 444 meters (1457 feet).
