= Arkansas Highway 59 =

State highway in Arkansas, United States

Highway 59

Route information
- Maintained by AHTD
- Length: 93.24 mi (150.06 km)
- Existed: 1935–present

Major junctions
- South end: AR 22 in Barling
- I-540 / US 71 in Van Buren; US 64 in Van Buren; I-40 in Van Buren; US 62 in Summers; US 412 in Siloam Springs
- North end: Route 59 at the Missouri state line near Sulphur Springs

Location
- Country: United States
- State: Arkansas
- Counties: Benton, Crawford, Washington

Highway system
- Arkansas Highway System; Interstate; US; State; Business; Spurs; Suffixed; Scenic; Heritage
← AR 58	→ AR 60

Arkansas Highway 59 is a north–south state highway in Northwest Arkansas. The route runs 93.24 miles (150.06 km) from Arkansas Highway 22 in Barling north to the Missouri state line through Van Buren, the county seat of Crawford County. Highway 59 parallels US 59 (in Oklahoma) between Siloam Springs and Fort Smith.

== Route description ==
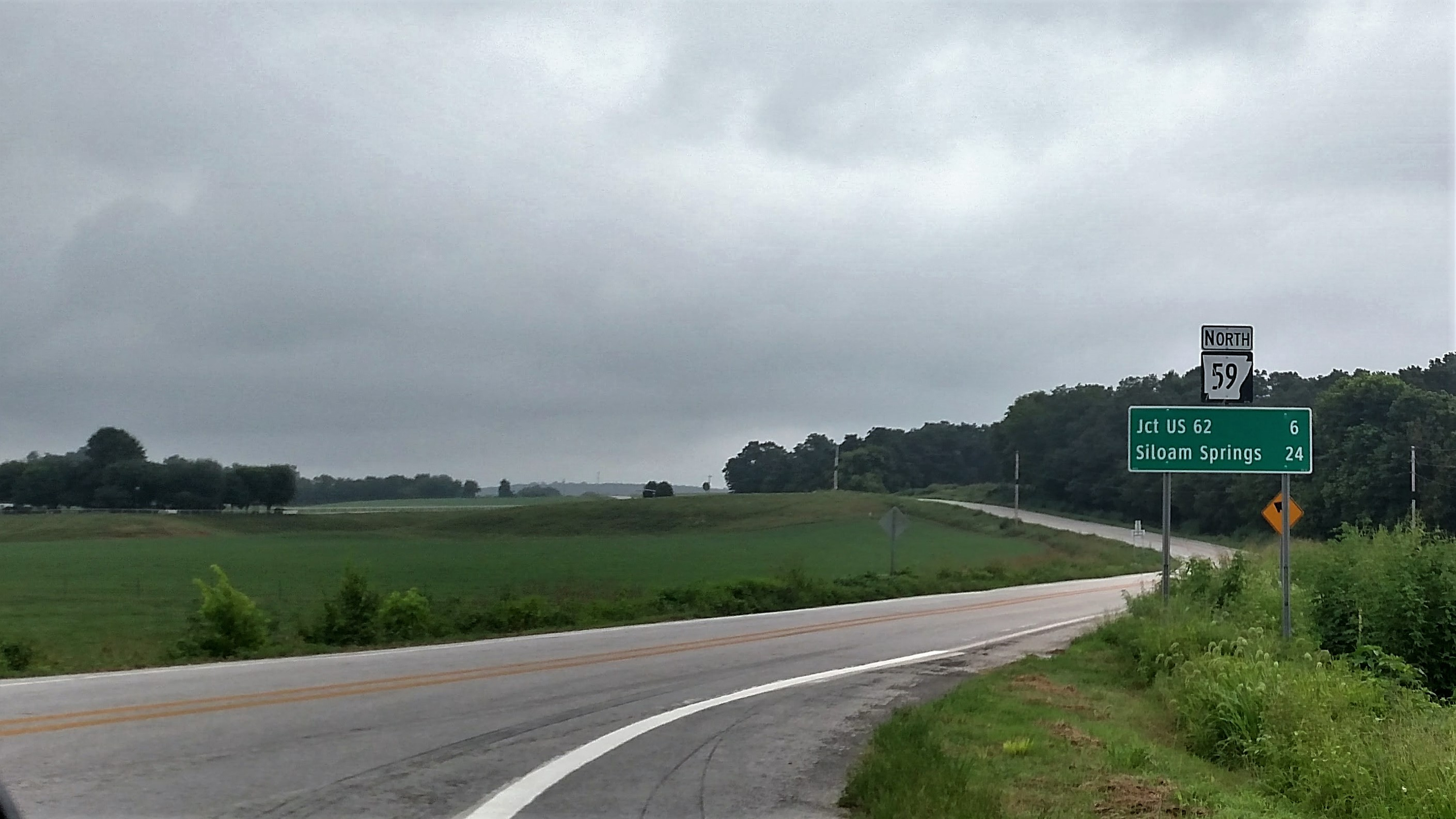
Highway 45 in western Washington County

The route begins in Barling at AR 22. The route runs north to enter Van Buren, crossing I-540 and briefly concurring with US 64. The concurrency begins near the Joseph Starr Dunham House and before crossing Interstate 40. The route exits town northbound, intersecting rural highways AR 162 and AR 220 in Cedarville and crossing Lee Creek on the historic Lee Creek Bridge. At this time, AR 59 is running through the Boston Mountains subdivision of The Ozarks. North of Cedarville, AR 59 curves west toward Oklahoma, coming within 0.1 miles (0.16 km) of the border.

Entering Washington County, the route meets Arkansas Highway 156 in Evansville and AR 244 in Tolu. The route continues north to Dutch Mills and Summers before entering Siloam Springs.

Upon entering Benton County, AR 59 concurs with US 412 east around the southeast edge of Siloam Springs. The concurrency ends and AR 59 continues north to Gentry. AR 59 passes near Kansas City-Southern Railway cars and Kansas City-Southern Depot in Decatur. The route continues north to AR 72 and the Kansas City Southern Railway Caboose No. 383 in Gravette. The highway runs further north to Wee Pine Knot, the Adar House, and Butler Creek Cemetery in Sulphur Springs. AR 59 meets Missouri Route 59 at the Missouri state line and terminates.

== History ==
When Arkansas established its first numbered state highway system in 1926, Arkansas Highway 59 was designated for a route that led from the Louisiana state line to Eudora. The South Arkansas route later became AR 159, and the 59 number moved to northwest Arkansas. In 1936, AR 59 traveled from Van Buren north to Siloam Springs. From AR 72 at Gravette, north to the Missouri state line, AR 59 is the original alignment of US 71. The roadway continues north into Missouri as Missouri Route 59.

The route was widened by the AHTD in 2007 around Siloam Springs.

== Major intersections ==
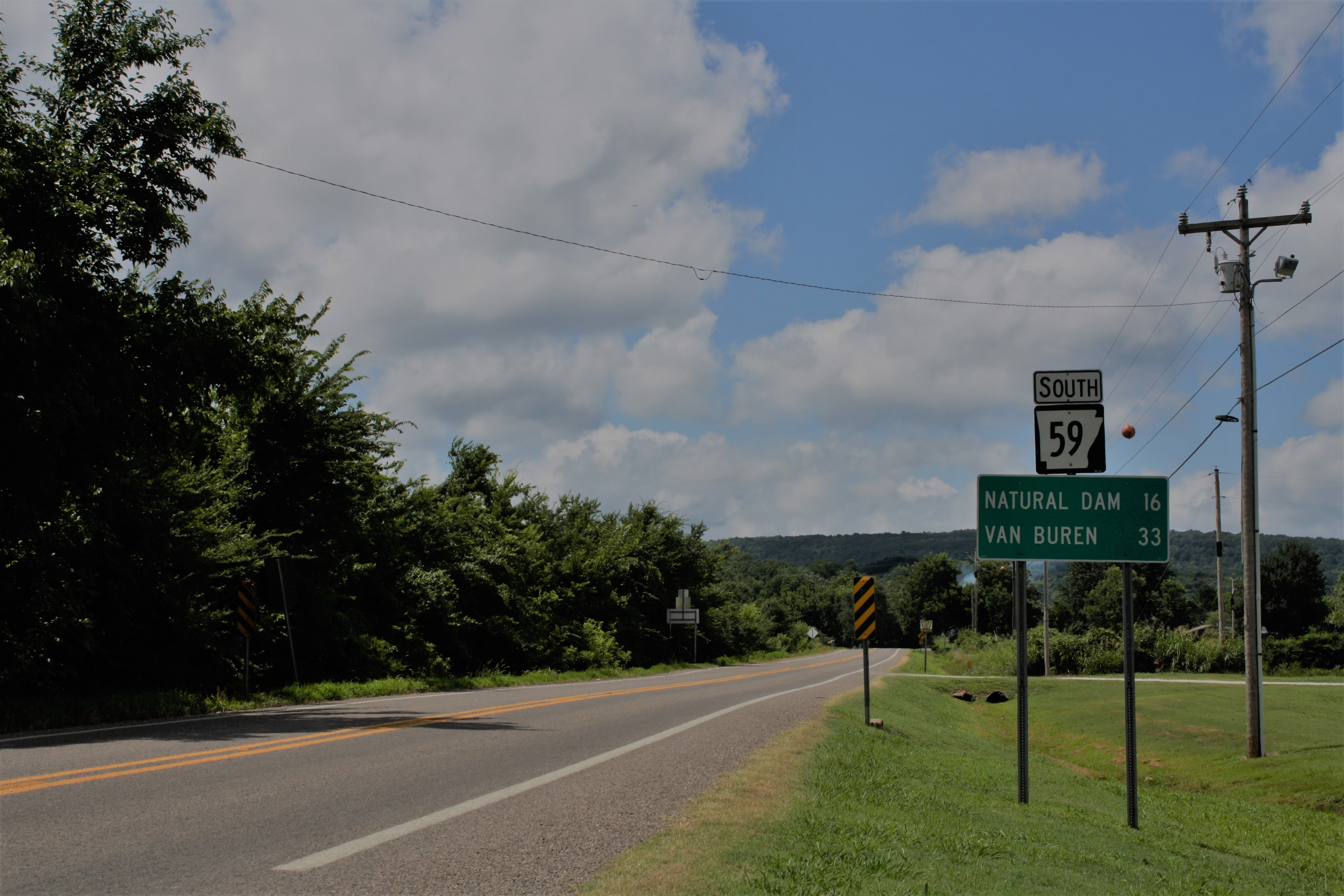
Highway 59 in Evansville

County	Location	mi	km	Destinations	Notes
Sebastian	Barling	0.0	0.0	AR 22 – Charleston, Fort Smith	
Crawford	Van Buren			Gun Club Road to I-49	Future proposed connection
Crawford	Van Buren			I-540 (US 71) to I-40 – Fort Smith, Little Rock	I-540 exit 3
Crawford	Van Buren	8.7	14.0	US 64 west / US 71B south – Fort Smith	South end of US 64 / US 71B overlap
Crawford	Van Buren	9.1	14.6	US 64 east / US 71B north (Broadway) – Alma	North end of US 64 / US 71B overlap
Crawford	Van Buren	11.2	18.0	I-40 to I-540 – Sallisaw, OK, Little Rock, trucks for Van Buren	I-40 exit 5
Crawford	Figure Five	15.0	24.1	AR 348 east – Rudy	
Crawford		17.4	28.0	AR 220 west (Uniontown Highway) – Uniontown	South end of AR 220 overlap
Crawford	Cedarville	19.4	31.2	AR 162 east	
Crawford	Cedarville	21.4	34.4	AR 220 east – Lee Creek	North end of AR 220 overlap
Washington		40.9	65.8	AR 156 west – Stilwell, OK	
Washington		41.2	66.3	AR 244 west – Stilwell, OK	
Washington		44.5	71.6	AR 45 north – Canehill	
Washington		50.6	81.4	US 62 east – Prairie Grove, Fayetteville, Prairie Grove Battlefield State Park	South end of US 62 overlap
Washington	Summers	52.2	84.0	US 62 west – Muskogee, OK	North end of US 62 overlap
Washington		61.4	98.8	AR 244 east	
Benton	Siloam Springs	67.4	108.5	US 412 west / AR 264 west – Siloam Springs, Tulsa, OK	Interchange; south end of US 412 overlap
Benton	Siloam Springs	67.8	109.1	AR 16S	
Benton	Siloam Springs	68.6	110.4	AR 16 east	
Benton	Siloam Springs	69.6	112.0	US 412 east – Springdale	North end of US 412 overlap
Benton	Siloam Springs	70.1	112.8	AR 980 – Siloam Springs Municipal Airport	
Benton	Siloam Springs	70.6	113.6	AR 43 north (East Cheri Whitlock Drive)	
Benton	Gentry	75.5	121.5	AR 59B north (Collins Avenue) – Business District	
Benton	Gentry	75.7	121.8	AR 12 (East Third Street) to AR 43 – Northwest Arkansas Regional Airport	
Benton	Gentry	76.0	122.3	AR 59B south (East Main Street) – Business District	
Benton	Gentry	76.6	123.3	AR 59S south (North Railroad Avenue)	
Benton	Decatur	81.5	131.2	AR 102 east (East Roller Avenue) – Centerton	South end of AR 102 overlap
Benton	Decatur	81.6	131.3	AR 102 west (North Main Street) – Maysville	North end of AR 102 overlap
Benton	Gravette	88.2	141.9	AR 72 east (Atlanta Street East) – Hiwasse	South end of AR 72 overlap
Benton	Gravette	88.3	142.1	AR 72 west – Maysville	North end of AR 72 overlap
Benton		95.0	152.9	Route 59 north – Joplin	Missouri state line
1.000 mi = 1.609 km; 1.000 km = 0.621 mi: Concurrency terminus; Unopened

== Special routes ==
AR 59 has two special routes, both in Gentry.

=== Gentry business route ===
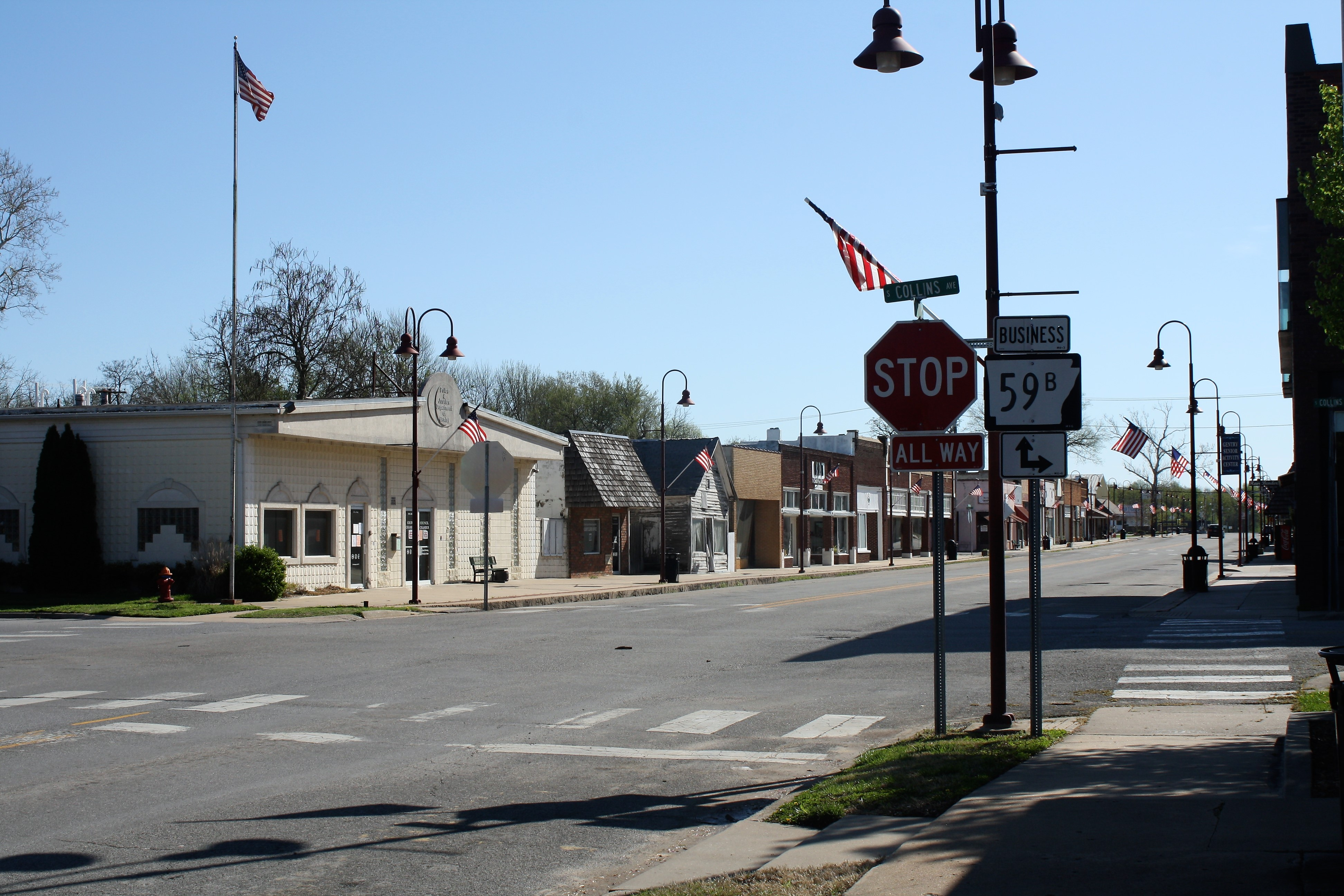
AR 59B turns onto Main Street in Gentry

Highway 59B
- Location: Gentry
- Length: 0.94 mi (1,510 m)

Arkansas Highway 59 Business is a 0.94-mile (1.51 km) business route in Gentry.

=== Gentry spur ===
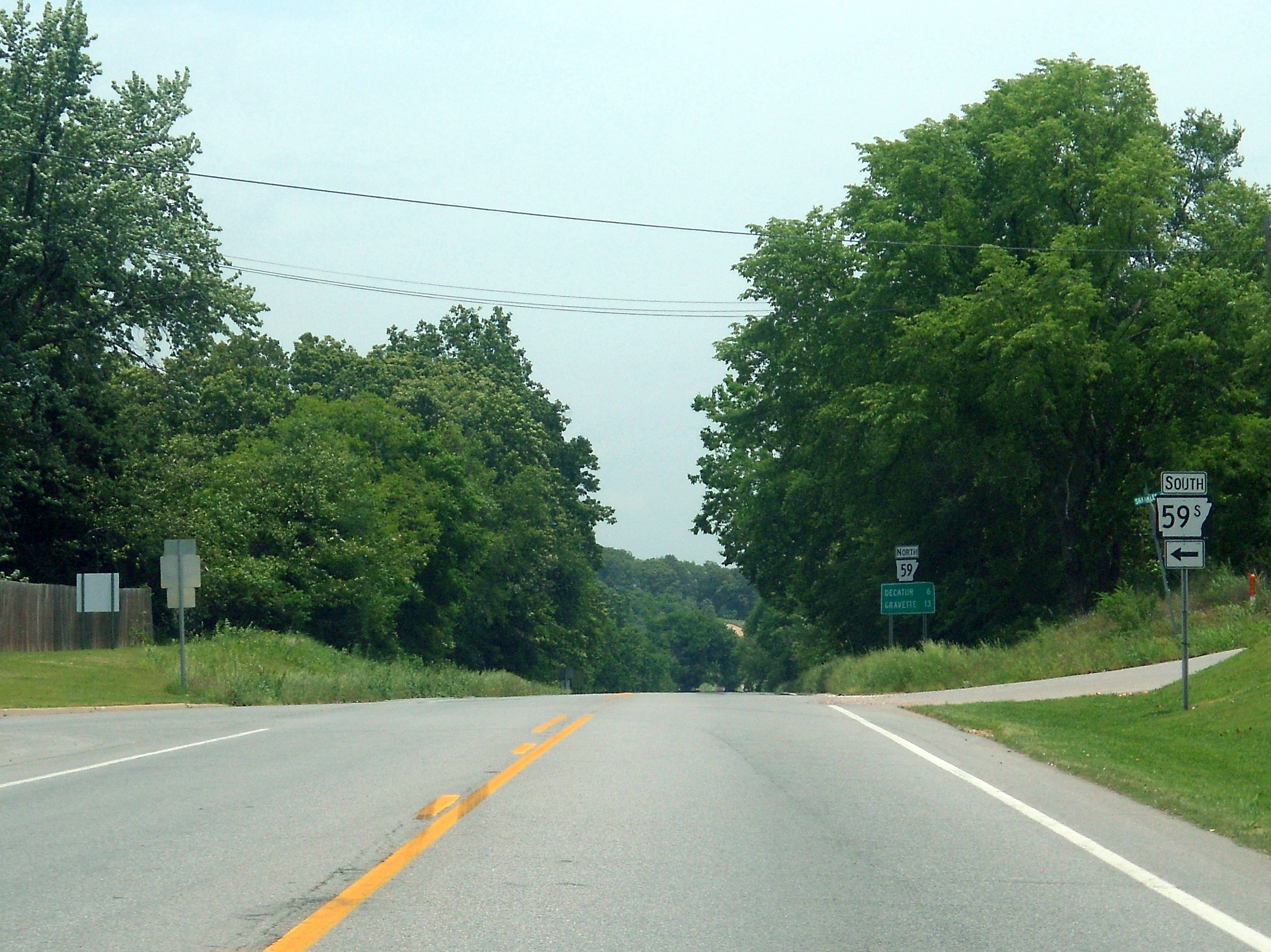
AR 59S eastern terminus at AR 59 in Gentry

Highway 59S
- Location: Gentry
- Length: 0.71 mi (1,140 m)

Arkansas Highway 59 Spur is a 0.71-mile (1.14 km) spur route in Gentry.
