= Arkansas Highway 102 =

State highway in Arkansas, United States

Highway 102
- AR 102 highlighted in red

Route information
- Maintained by ArDOT
- Length: 26.184 mi (42.139 km)
- Existed: April 1, 1926–present

Major junctions
- West end: AR 43
- East end: I-49 / US 62 / US 71 in Bentonville

Location
- Country: United States
- State: Arkansas
- Counties: Benton

Highway system
- Arkansas Highway System; Interstate; US; State; Business; Spurs; Suffixed; Scenic; Heritage
← AR 101	→ AR 103

Highway 102 (AR 102, Ark. 102, Hwy. 102) is an east–west state highway in Benton County, Arkansas. The highway connects two of western Benton County's population centers to Bentonville and Interstate 49 (I-49), the main north–south route in the Northwest Arkansas region.

Created as an original state highway in 1926, the route has been extended or truncated around once per decade until 2004. A single spur route runs north–south as Main Street in Centerton. Both highways are maintained by the Arkansas Department of Transportation (ArDOT).

== Route description ==
ArDOT maintains Highway 102 as part of the state highway system. Including concurrencies, the highest traffic segment in 2021 was between Walton Boulevard and Greenhouse Road in Bentonville, with 36,000 vehicles per day on average. It remains over 30,000 VPD heading east from this segment, but drops as it travels west, with 14,000 VPD west of Highway 102B, 3,900 west of Centerton, and 1,800 west of Decatur.

The segment of Highway 102 between Walton Boulevard and I-49 is part of the National Highway System (NHS), a network of roads important to the nation's economy, defense, and mobility.

Highway 102 begins in the northwestern corner of Arkansas, less than 10 miles (16 km) from the OKARMO Corner in Springfield Plateau of the Ozark Mountains. Beginning at a junction with Highway 43, the route runs east through sparsely populated agricultural land, curving south to cross Spavinaw Creek before curving back east and running into the small town of Decatur. Upon entering Decatur, Highway 102 intersects Highway 59; the two routes form a short concurrency south as Main Street. The concurrency ends when Highway 102 turns east onto Roller Avenue, with the highway exiting the city eastbound shortly thereafter. After passing through another rural section of Benton County, Highway 102 curves to become a section line road entering Centerton, where it briefly overlaps Highway 279 before becoming a main commercial thoroughfare known as Centerton Boulevard. Highway 102 passes just north of the Centerton State Fish Hatchery and serves as the western terminus of its only business route, Highway 102B (Main Street) near downtown Centerton.

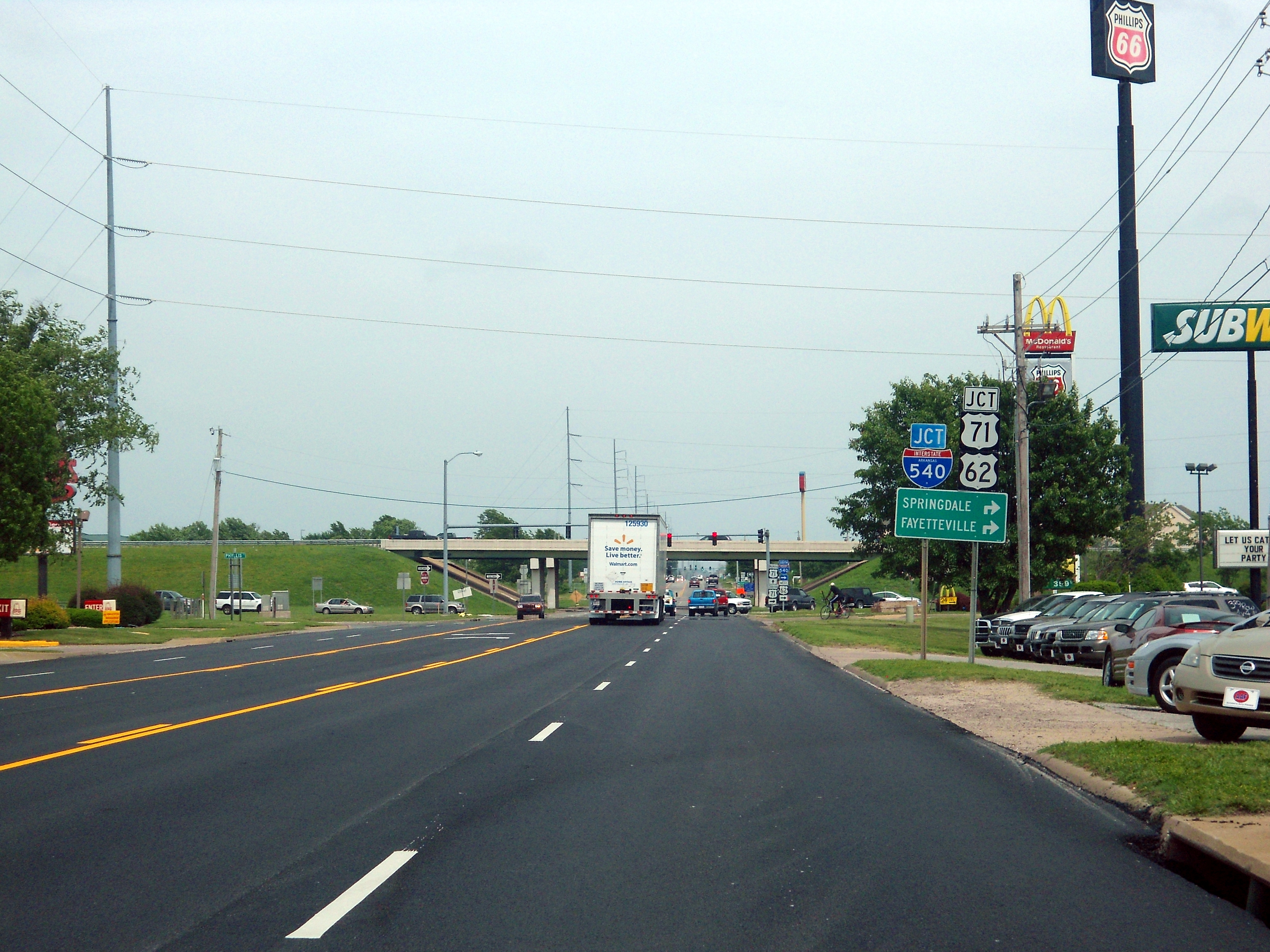
Highway 102 eastern terminus at I-540 (now I-49)

East of this junction, Highway 102B enters Bentonville, the county seat of Benton County, becoming known as 14th Street. The highway passes through residential and commercial districts of Bentonville before crossing Walton Boulevard (former US 71B). Continuing east, Highway 102 serves as the southern boundary of Walmart headquarters before meeting I-49/US 62/US 71. The roadway continues east as US 62, toward Northwest Arkansas Community College and Rogers.

== History ==
Highway 102 was created during the 1926 Arkansas state highway numbering, making it one of the original state highways. State Road 102 ran between Oklahoma and Decatur, but was extended to US 71 (now AR 72) in Centerton in 1929. Around 1945, the route was truncated to Decatur.

The Arkansas General Assembly passed the Act 148 of 1957, the Milum Road Act, creating 10–12 miles (16–19 km) of new state highways in each county. As part of the act, the Arkansas Highway Department extended Highway 102 east from Main Street in Centerton to US 62 on July 10, 1957. This created a three-way junction of AR 102 in Centerton. Fourteen months later, the highway's eastern terminus was truncated to AR 94 in Rogers.

On March 2, 1960, the Arkansas State Highway Commission resolved to apply to AASHTO concurrently with the Missouri State Highway Department for a rerouting of US 71 onto AR 100. The application was approved, which caused AR 102 between Maysville and Gravette to be redesignated as AR 72, truncating the route at Decatur. On October 28, 1970, a connection was reestablished between Decatur and Maysville when AR 102 was extended west from Decatur, supplanting Benton County Road 1002. After the opening of the new freeway (initially designated US 62, later to become I-540, presently I-49), the section east of the freeway was redesignated as US 62.

== Major intersections ==
Mile markers reset at concurrencies. The entire route is in Benton County.

Location	mi	km	Destinations	Notes
	0.000	0.000	AR 43 – Siloam Springs, Maysville	Western terminus
Decatur	8.940	14.388	AR 59 north (Main Street) – Gravette	Western end of AR 59 concurrency
Decatur	0.000	0.000	AR 59 south (Main Street) – Siloam Springs	Eastern end of AR 59 concurrency
Centerton			AR 279 north	Western end of AR 279 concurrency
Centerton			AR 279 south (Vaughn Road) – Vaughn, Benton County Fairgrounds	Eastern end of AR 279 concurrency
Centerton	11.364	18.289	AR 102B east (Main Street) to AR 72	Western terminus of AR 102B
Bentonville	17.244	27.752	I-49 (US 71) / US 62 (Hudson Road) – Springdale, Fayetteville, Bella Vista	Eastern terminus; exit 86 on I-49
1.000 mi = 1.609 km; 1.000 km = 0.621 mi: Concurrency terminus

== Centerton business route ==
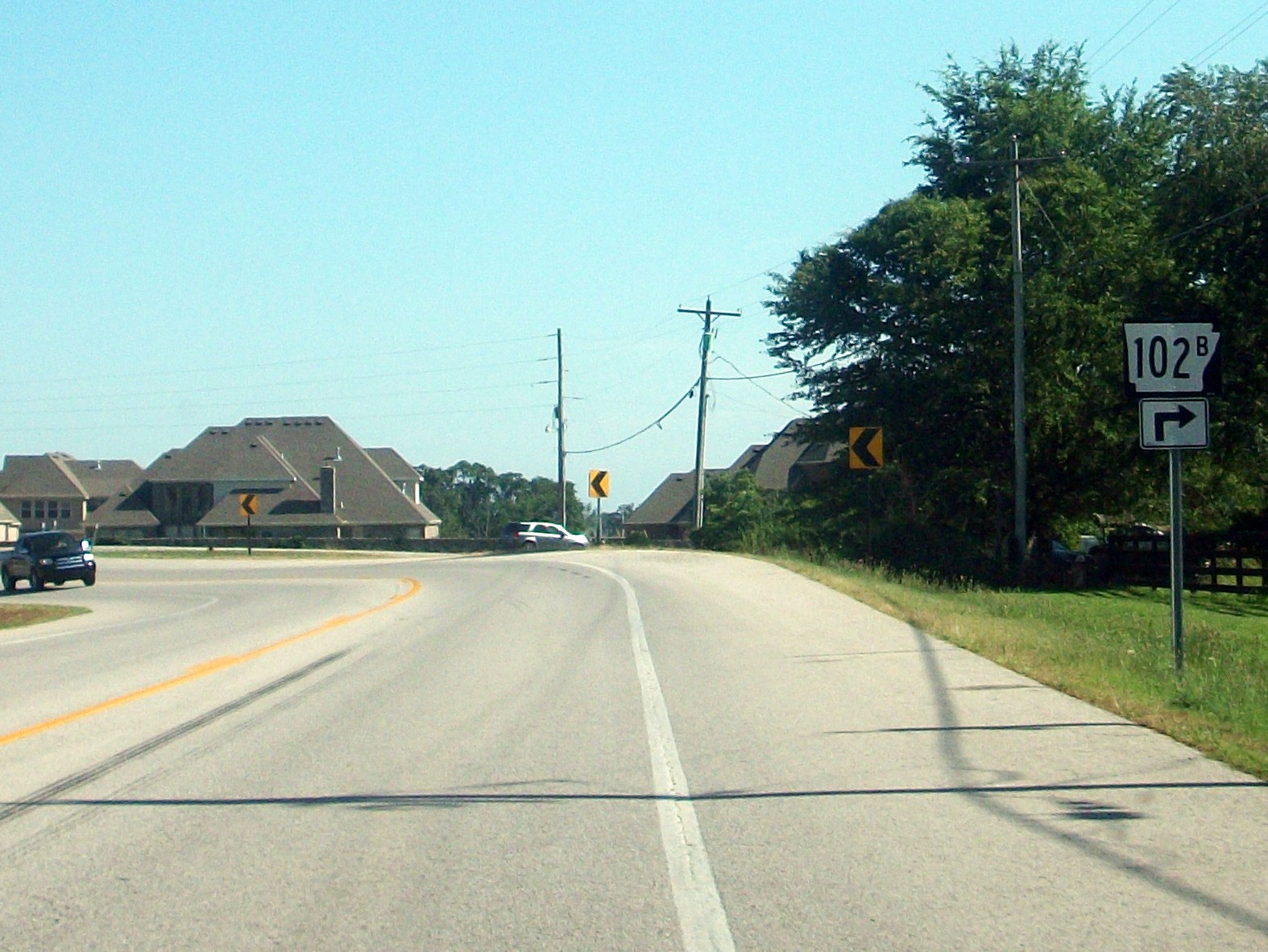
Highway 102B northern terminus at Highway 72

Highway 102B
- Location: Centerton
- Length: 1.757 mi (2.828 km)
- Existed: August 18, 2004–present

Highway 102 Business (AR 102B, Ark. 102B, and Hwy. 102B) is a business route of 1.757 miles (2.828 km) in Centerton. The route's southern terminus is at Highway 102 (Centerton Boulevard) with its northern terminus at Highway 72 (SW 2nd St) in Bentonville, southeast of Hiwasse.

History

The highway was added to the state highway system as part of an extension of AR 102 on 1929. Following another extension to Rogers on July 10, 1957, the highway had two termini. This situation continued until August 18, 2004, when the Arkansas State Highway Commission redesignated the segment running along Main Street in Centerton as AR 102B.

Major intersections

The entire route is in Benton County.

Location	mi	km	Destinations	Notes
Centerton	0.000	0.000	AR 102 (Centerton Boulevard) – Bentonville, Decatur	Southern terminus
Bentonville	1.757	2.828	AR 72 (SW 2nd Street)	Northern terminus
1.000 mi = 1.609 km; 1.000 km = 0.621 mi

== See also ==
- Arkansas Highway 102 (1985–2007), former state highway in Rogers
