= Arkansas Highway 72 =

State highway in Arkansas, United States

Highway 72

Route information
- Maintained by ArDOT
- Existed: 1926–present

Section 1
- Length: 26.32 mi (42.36 km)
- West end: AR 43 at Maysville
- Major intersections: I-49 in Gravette
- East end: Walton Boulevard in Bentonville

Section 2
- Length: 12.67 mi (20.39 km)
- West end: I-49 / US 71 in Bentonville
- East end: US 62 near Avoca

Location
- Country: United States
- State: Arkansas
- Counties: Benton

Highway system
- Arkansas Highway System; Interstate; US; State; Business; Spurs; Suffixed; Scenic; Heritage
← US 71	→ AR 73

Arkansas Highway 72 (AR 72) is a designation for two east–west state highways in Benton County, Arkansas. One segment of 26.32 miles (42.36 km) runs from Highway 43 at Maysville east to Walton Boulevard in Bentonville. A second segment of 12.67 miles (20.39 km) runs from Interstate 49 (I-49) in Bentonville east to U.S. Route 62 (US 62) north of Avoca. The route is one of the original Arkansas state highways.

== Route description ==
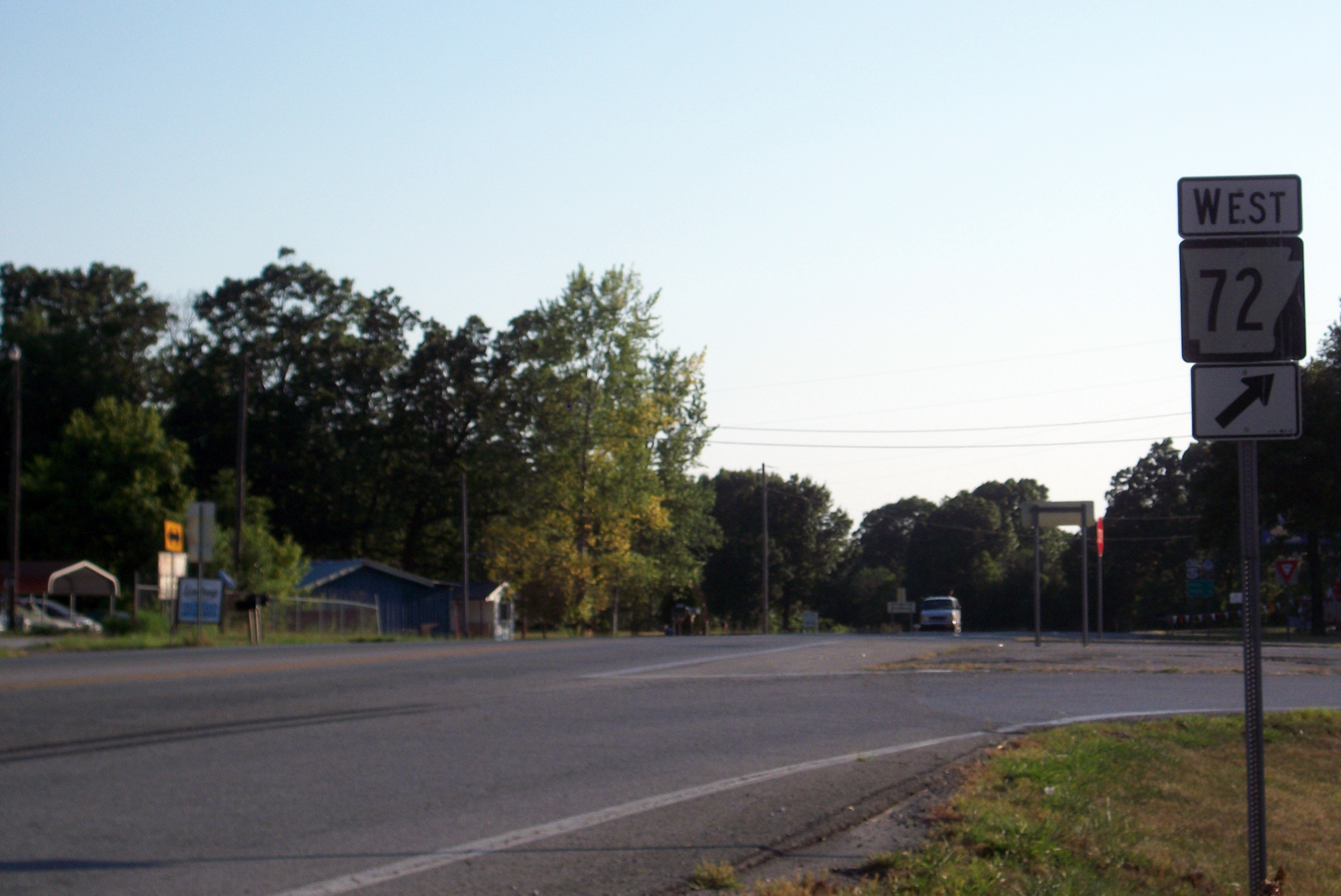
Highway 72 near Avoca

=== Maysville to Bentonville ===
The route begins at Highway 43 in Maysville and runs east to Gravette. Highway 72 intersects Highway 59 in Gravette near the Kansas City Southern Railway Caboose No. 383 on the National Register of Historic Places. The highway continues east past the Banks House to the community of Hiwasse within Gravette, having an interchange with I-49 just west of the community, where the highway passes the Hiwasse Bank Building. Upon reaching Hiwasse, Highway 72 has an officially designated exception of 0.52 miles (0.84 km) with Highway 279. The highway runs southeast into Centerton, having another interchange with I-49 southeast of Hiwasee. Highway 72 has a junction with Highway 102B before entering Bentonville. In Bentonville the highway becomes Central Avenue, running east through subdivisions until meeting Walton Boulevard (former US 71B) and terminating a few blocks west of the Bentonville town square.

=== Bentonville to Avoca ===
Highway 72 begins at I-49/US 71 in Bentonville and runs northeast to Pea Ridge. The highway has an overlap with Highway 94 through Pea Ridge before turning southeast and runs through Pea Ridge National Military Park. South of the park, Highway 72 terminates at US 62.

== History ==
Between Bentonville and Gravette, Highway 72 follows a former alignment of U.S. Route 71. In the late 1990s, Highway 72 was rerouted away from downtown Bentonville along US 71B, Highway 102, and Highway 112.

== Major intersections ==
The entire route is in Benton County.

Location	mi	km	Destinations	Notes
Maysville	0.00	0.00	AR 43	Western terminus
Gravette			AR 59 north (1st Avenue) – Joplin, MO	Western end of AR 59 concurrency
Gravette			AR 59 south (1st Avenue) – Siloam Springs	Eastern end of AR 59 concurrency
Gravette			I-49	Exit 100 on I-49; former AR 549
Gravette	15.20	24.46	AR 279 south	Western end of AR 279 concurrency
Gravette	15.72	25.30	AR 279 north	Eastern end of AR 279 concurrency
Gravette			I-49	Exit 97 on I-49; former AR 549
Centerton			AR 102B west (Main Street) – Centerton	Eastern terminus of AR 102B
Bentonville	26.32	42.36	Walton Boulevard – Pea Ridge, Bella Vista, Rogers	Eastern terminus; former US 71B
Bentonville	Gap in route			
Bentonville	0.00	0.00	I-49 (US 71) – Bentonville, Fayetteville, Bella Vista, Joplin, MO	Western terminus; exit 88A on I-49; former I-540
Pea Ridge	6.79	10.93	AR 94 east (South Curtis Avenue) – Rogers	Western end of AR 94 concurrency
Pea Ridge	7.72	12.42	AR 94 west to AR 340 west	Eastern end of AR 94 concurrency
	12.67	20.39	US 62 – Harrison, Pea Ridge National Military Park	Eastern terminus
1.000 mi = 1.609 km; 1.000 km = 0.621 mi: Concurrency terminus

== Bentonville spur ==
Highway 72S
- Location: Bentonville
- Length: 1 mi (1.6 km)
- Existed: yes

Arkansas Highway 72 Spur (AR 72B) is a former spur route in Bentonville. Its southern terminus was at an intersection with US 71 with a northern terminus at an intersection with Highway 72 in Bentonville. Running a total distance of 1-mile (1.6 km), it was an older alignment of US 71 and at one time was part of US 71B.
