= Arkansas Highway 244 =

State highway in Arkansas, United States

Highway 244
- AR 244 highlighted in red

Route information
- Maintained by ArDOT
- Existed: June 28, 1961–present

Section 1
- Length: 0.593 mi (954 m)
- West end: SH-51 at the Oklahoma state line near Stilwell, OK
- East end: AR 59 near Tolu

Section 2
- Length: 6.704 mi (10.789 km)
- West end: AR 59 near Cincinnati
- East end: AR 16 near Wedington

Location
- Country: United States
- State: Arkansas
- Counties: Benton, Washington

Highway system
- Arkansas Highway System; Interstate; US; State; Business; Spurs; Suffixed; Scenic; Heritage
| ← AR 243 | → AR 245 |

Highway 244 (AR 244, Ark. 244, and Hwy. 244) is a designation for two state highways in Northwest Arkansas. Both segments are low volume, two-lane roadways in rural areas. The first segment was created in 1961, with the second designated in 1973 and extended through 1975. Both segments are maintained by the Arkansas Department of Transportation (ArDOT).

== Route description ==
ArDOT maintains both segments of AR 244 as part of the state highway system. ArDOT estimates the traffic level for a segment of roadway was highest near the Oklahoma state line, estimated at 1,100 vehicles per day in 2019, on average. The other segment was estimated at 420 VPD. For reference, roads under 400 VPD are classified as "very low volume local road" by the American Association of State Highway and Transportation Officials (AASHTO).

Neither segment of AR 244 is part of the National Highway System (NHS), a network of roads important to the nation's economy, defense, and mobility.

=== Section 1 ===
Highway 244 begins at the Oklahoma state line in Washington County north of the unincorporated community of Evansville. The roadway continues west as Oklahoma State Highway 51 (SH-51). AR 244 continues east for less than a mile to terminate at AR 59.

=== Section 2 ===
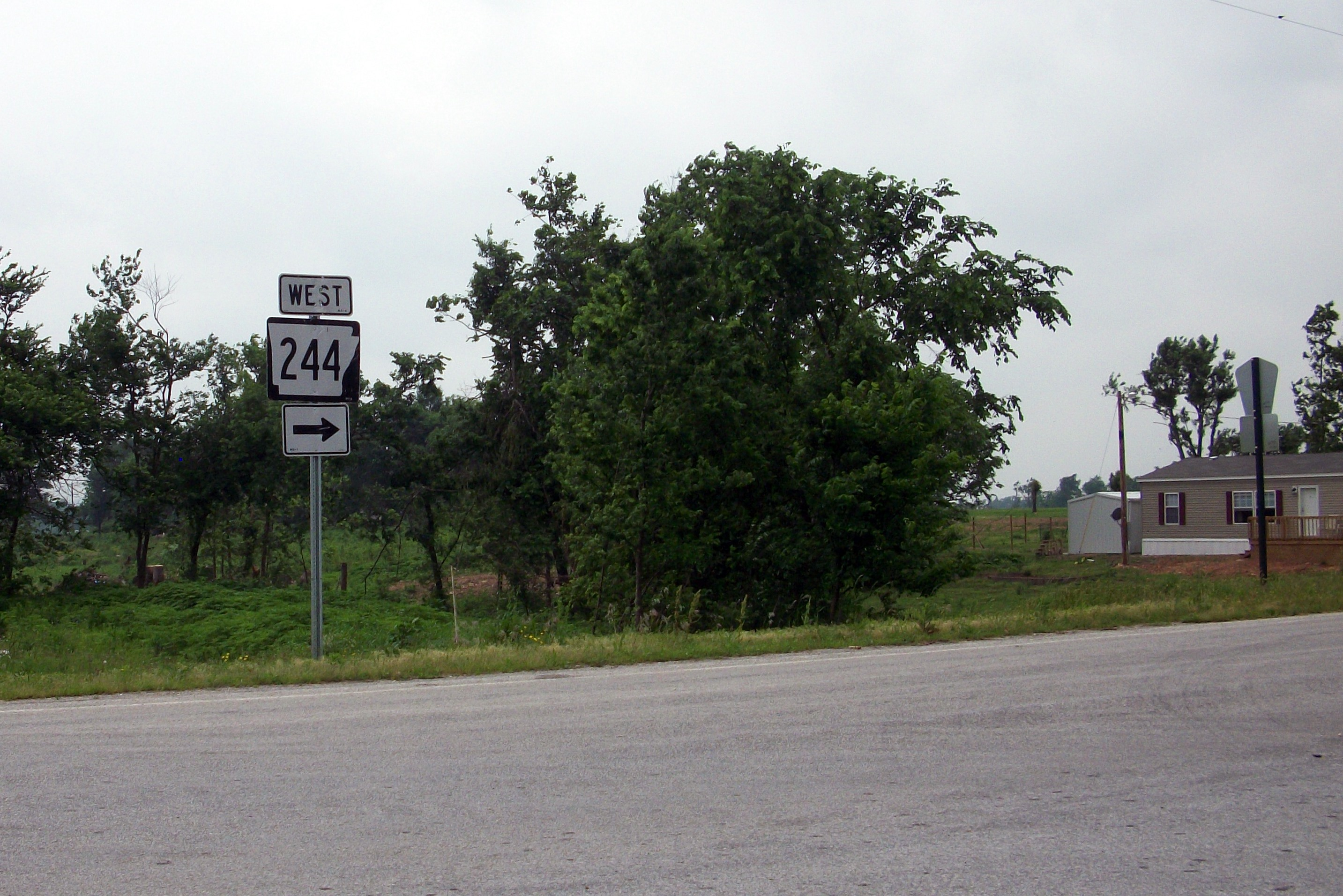
Eastern terminus of AR 244 at Arkansas Highway 16

The second segment of AR 244 begins north of the unincorporated community of Cincinnati in Washington County at AR 59 and runs east. The route shifts north slightly to run along the Benton County line until terminating at AR 16 near the unincorporated community of Wedington on the border of the Ozark National Forest.

== History ==
The Arkansas State Highway Commission created the AR 244 designation between Oklahoma and AR 59 on June 28, 1961. At the time, the western terminus was SH-100.

In 1973, the Arkansas General Assembly passed Act 9 of 1973. The act directed county judges and legislators to designate up to 12 miles (19 km) of county roads as state highways in each county. One of the highways designated under this act was a second segment of AR 244 created on March 28, 1973. The state highway designation supplanted a county road from AR 16 west to Benton County Route 1 (CR 1, Nokes Farm Road). Three months later, the designation was extended west to Washington County Route 25 (CR 25, Cincinnati Creek Road). On January 8, 1975 the Highway Commission extended AR 244 to AR 59, the current western terminus.

== Major intersections ==
| County | Location | mi | km | Destinations | Notes |
|---|---|---|---|---|---|
| Washington | | 0.000 | 0.000 | End state maintenance, road continues as SH-51 | Western terminus |
| Washington | | 0.593 | 0.954 | AR 59 – Fayetteville, Van Buren | Eastern terminus |
| Washington | Gap in route | | | | |
| Washington | | 0.000 | 0.000 | AR 59 | Western terminus |
| Washington–Benton county line | | 6.704 | 10.789 | AR 16 | Eastern terminus |
1.000 mi = 1.609 km; 1.000 km = 0.621 mi
