= Arkansas Highway 348 =

State highway in Arkansas, United States

Highway 348
- AR 348 highlighted in red

Route information
- Maintained by ArDOT
- Existed: November 23, 1966–present

Section 1
- Length: 5.56 mi (8.95 km)
- West end: AR 59 at Figure Five
- East end: AR 60

Section 2
- Length: 3.61 mi (5.81 km)
- West end: US 71 at Cain
- East end: National Forest Route 1007

Location
- Country: United States
- State: Arkansas
- Counties: Crawford

Highway system
- Arkansas Highway System; Interstate; US; State; Business; Spurs; Suffixed; Scenic; Heritage
← AR 347	→ AR 349

Highway 348 (AR 348, Ark. 348, and Hwy. 348) is a designation for two east–west state highways in Crawford County. One segment of 5.56 miles (8.95 km) runs from Highway 59 at Figure Five east to Arkansas Highway 60 near Rudy. A second segment of 3.61 miles (5.81 km) runs from US Route 71 (US 71) at Cain east to National Forest Route 1007.

== Route description ==
=== Figure Five to Rudy ===
AR 348 begins at US 71 at the unincorporated community of Cain south of Mountainburg. The route runs northeast, entering the Ozark National Forest and terminating at an intersection with National Forest Route 1007 and Hickory Street. The road is two–lane undivided for its entire length.

=== Cain to Ozark National Forest ===
The route begins at Highway 59 at the Figure Five community and runs east as a rural two-lane route. Winding through forested mountains, Highway 348 terminates at Highway 60 near Rudy.

== History ==
Highway 348 was created by the Arkansas State Highway Commission on November 23, 1966. The second segment between Cain and the National Forest was designated on June 28, 1973, pursuant to Act 9 of 1973 by the Arkansas General Assembly. The act directed county judges and legislators to designate up to 12 miles (19 km) of county roads as state highways in each county.

== Major intersections ==
The entire route is in Crawford County.

Location	mi	km	Destinations	Notes
Figure Five	0.00	0.00	AR 59 – Cedarville, Evansville, Van Buren	Western terminus
	5.56	8.95	AR 60 – Rudy	Eastern terminus
Gap in route
Cain	0.00	0.00	US 71	Eastern terminus
	4.63	7.45	Forest Route 1007	Western terminus
1.000 mi = 1.609 km; 1.000 km = 0.621 mi
