= Illinois Township, Washington County, Arkansas =

Township of Illinois
- Township
- Location of Illinois Township in Washington County

- Location of Washington County in Arkansas
- Coordinates: 36°3′15″N 94°29′1″W
- Country: United States
- State: Arkansas
- County: Washington
- Established: 1829

Area
  - Total: 33.6 sq mi (87 km^{2})
  - Land: 33.6 sq mi (87 km^{2})
  - Water: 0.0 sq mi (0 km^{2}) 0%
- Elevation: 1,053 ft (321 m)

Population (2000)
  - Total: 655
  - Density: 19/sq mi (7.3/km^{2})
- Time zone: UTC-6 (CST)
  - Summer (DST): UTC-5 (CDT)
- Area code: 479
- GNIS feature ID: 69791

Illinois Township is one of thirty-seven townships in Washington County, Arkansas, USA. As of the 2000 census, its total population was 655.

Illinois Township was established in 1829.

== Geography ==
According to the United States Census Bureau, Illinois Township covers an area of 33.6 square miles (87 km^{2}), all land.

=== Cities, towns, villages ===
- Cincinnati

=== Cemeteries ===
The township contains Beatty Cemetery, Harold Cemetery, Norwood Cemetery and Old Union Cemetery.

=== Major routes ===
- Arkansas Highway 59
- Arkansas Highway 244
