= Morrow, Arkansas =

- Census-designated place
- Location within Arkansas Location within the United States
- Coordinates: 35°51′21″N 94°26′07″W
- Country: United States
- State: Arkansas
- County: Washington
- Elevation: 1,089 ft (332 m)

Population (2020)
  - Total: 263
- Time zone: UTC-6 (Central (CST))
  - Summer (DST): UTC-5 (CDT)
- ZIP code: 72749
- Area code: 479
- GNIS feature ID: 2805663

Morrow is an unincorporated community and census-designated place (CDP) in Washington County, Arkansas, United States. A post office has been in operation at Morrow since 1883; The community had the name of G. W. Morrow, an early postmaster. it was first listed as a CDP in the 2020 census with a population of 263;

Morrow is located in the Northwest Arkansas region 6.5 miles (10.5 km) south of Lincoln. Morrow has a post office with ZIP code 72749.

== Education ==
The community is served by the Lincoln Consolidated School District. Lincoln High School is its sole high school.

== Demographics ==
Historical population
Census	Pop.	Note	%±
2020	263		—
U.S. Decennial Census; 2020

=== 2020 census ===
Morrow CDP, Arkansas – Racial and ethnic composition Note: the US Census treats Hispanic/Latino as an ethnic category. This table excludes Latinos from the racial categories and assigns them to a separate category. Hispanics/Latinos may be of any race.
Race / Ethnicity (NH = Non-Hispanic)	Pop 2020	% 2020
White alone (NH)	215	81.75%
Black or African American alone (NH)	0	0.00%
Native American or Alaska Native alone (NH)	8	3.04%
Asian alone (NH)	4	1.52%
Pacific Islander alone (NH)	0	0.00%
Some Other Race alone (NH)	0	0.00%
Mixed Race/Multi-Racial (NH)	24	9.13%
Hispanic or Latino (any race)	12	4.56%
Total	263	100.00%

== Transportation ==
As of 2023, there is no fixed route transit service in Morrow, although Ozark Regional Transit operates demand-response service in the area. The nearest intercity bus service is provided by Jefferson Lines in Fayetteville.
