= Dutch Mills, Arkansas =

- Unincorporated community
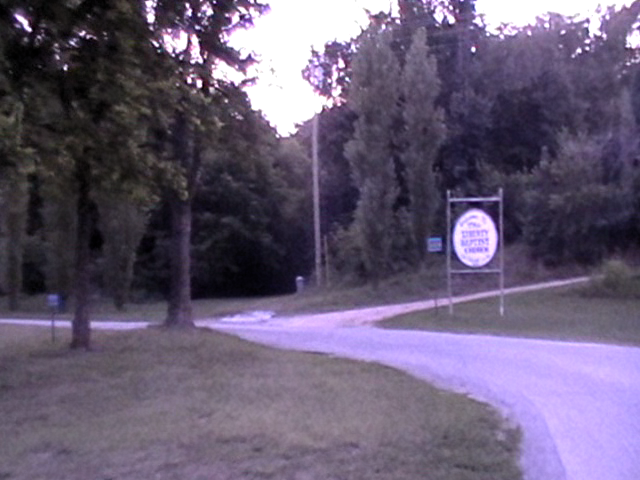
- Turn off to Dutch Mills on AR 59

- Dutch Mill's position in Arkansas. Dutch Mills, Arkansas (the United States)
- Coordinates: 35°52′32″N 94°29′30″W
- Country: United States
- State: Arkansas
- County: Washington
- Township: Dutch Mills
- First settled: early 1850s
- Hermannsburg post office established: September 1853
- Elevation: 1,027 ft (313 m)
- Time zone: UTC-6 (Central (CST))
  - Summer (DST): UTC-5 (CDT)
- Zip code: 72744
- Area code: 479
- GNIS feature ID: 71480

Dutch Mills is an unincorporated community in Dutch Mills Township, Washington County, Arkansas, United States. Dutch Mills is on a small tributary of the Baron Fork of the Illinois River on Arkansas Highway 59, approximately 6 miles (9.7 km) south of U.S. Route 62 and 1 mile (1.6 km) east of the Oklahoma border.

Since Dutch Mills is a small rural community, it receives mail delivery from Lincoln (ZIP code 72744). The population of the Lincoln ZCTA was 4,571 at the 2000 census. It is part of the Northwest Arkansas region.

== History ==
Dutch Mills was originally called Hermannsburg, named after its first documented settler, Johann H. Hermann, a German immigrant and former student at the University of Heidelberg. In the early 1850s, Johann Hermann and his brother, Karl F. Hermann acquired the property of the town, built a mill, laid out the lots, and acquired the rights to a United States post office. The brothers operated the mill, a small store, and both served as Postmaster (Johann in 1856 and Karl in 1859). Multiple German families moved there, following the Hermanns. Hermannsburg was located at a dangerous crossroads between The North and The South during the American Civil War. Bushwackers from both sides of the conflict regularly pillaged the town and conditions worsened after the Battle of Wilson's Creek. Renegade Missouri Governor Claiborne Jackson and his Confederate militia commandeered the Hermann home in Hermannsburg for the night while on their flight to Texas. Because many German immigrants sided with the Union cause, Southern bushwhackers would often target them for robbery and even murder. In December 1862, the last 19 German immigrants who remained in the town, including the Hermann brothers and their families, fled Hermannsburg under the cover of night for the safety of the larger German community in St. Louis. After the Civil War, the name of Hermannsburg was changed to Dutch Mills. The name change was likely intended as subtle insult, or perhaps a statement of indifference, by the English descended residents who didn't care to differentiate between the Germans and the Dutch.

== Education ==
Dutch Mills is located within the Lincoln Consolidated School District. Lincoln High School is its sole high school.
