= Dutch Mills Township, Washington County, Arkansas =

Township of Dutch Mills
- Township
- Location of Dutch Mills Township in Washington County

- Location of Washington County in Arkansas
- Coordinates: 35°53′15″N 94°29′40.8″W
- Country: United States
- State: Arkansas
- County: Washington
- Established: 1885

Area
  - Total: 14.9 sq mi (39 km^{2})
  - Land: 14.9 sq mi (39 km^{2})
  - Water: 0.0 sq mi (0 km^{2}) 0%
- Elevation: 1,011 ft (308 m)

Population (2000)
  - Total: 321
  - Density: 22/sq mi (8.5/km^{2})
- Time zone: UTC-6 (CST)
  - Summer (DST): UTC-5 (CDT)
- Area code: 479
- GNIS feature ID: 69786

Dutch Mills is one of thirty-seven townships in Washington County, Arkansas, USA. As of the 2000 census, its total population was 321.

Dutch Mills Township was established in 1885.

== Geography ==
According to the United States Census Bureau, Dutch Mills Township covers an area of 19.5 square miles (51 km^{2}); all land. Dutch Mills Township was created in 1885.

=== Cities, towns, villages ===
- Dutch Mills
- Sexton (historical)

=== Cemeteries ===
The township contains White Rock Cemetery.

=== Major routes ===
- Arkansas Highway 59
