= Arkansas Highway 279 =

State highway in Arkansas, United States

Highway 279

Route information
- Maintained by AHTD
- Length: 14.87 mi (23.93 km)

Major junctions
- South end: AR 12 in Vaughn
- AR 102 in Centerton; AR 72 in Hiwasse
- North end: Route OO at the Missouri state line in Bella Vista

Location
- Country: United States
- State: Arkansas
- Counties: Benton

Highway system
- Arkansas Highway System; Interstate; US; State; Business; Spurs; Suffixed; Scenic; Heritage
← US 278	→ AR 280

Arkansas Highway 279 (AR 279 and Hwy. 279) is a north–south state highway in Benton County, Arkansas. The route runs 14.87 miles (23.93 km) from Arkansas Highway 12 at Vaughn north to the Missouri state line through Centerton. The route has a rare officially designated exception of 0.52 miles (0.84 km), overlapping Arkansas Highway 72.

== Route description ==
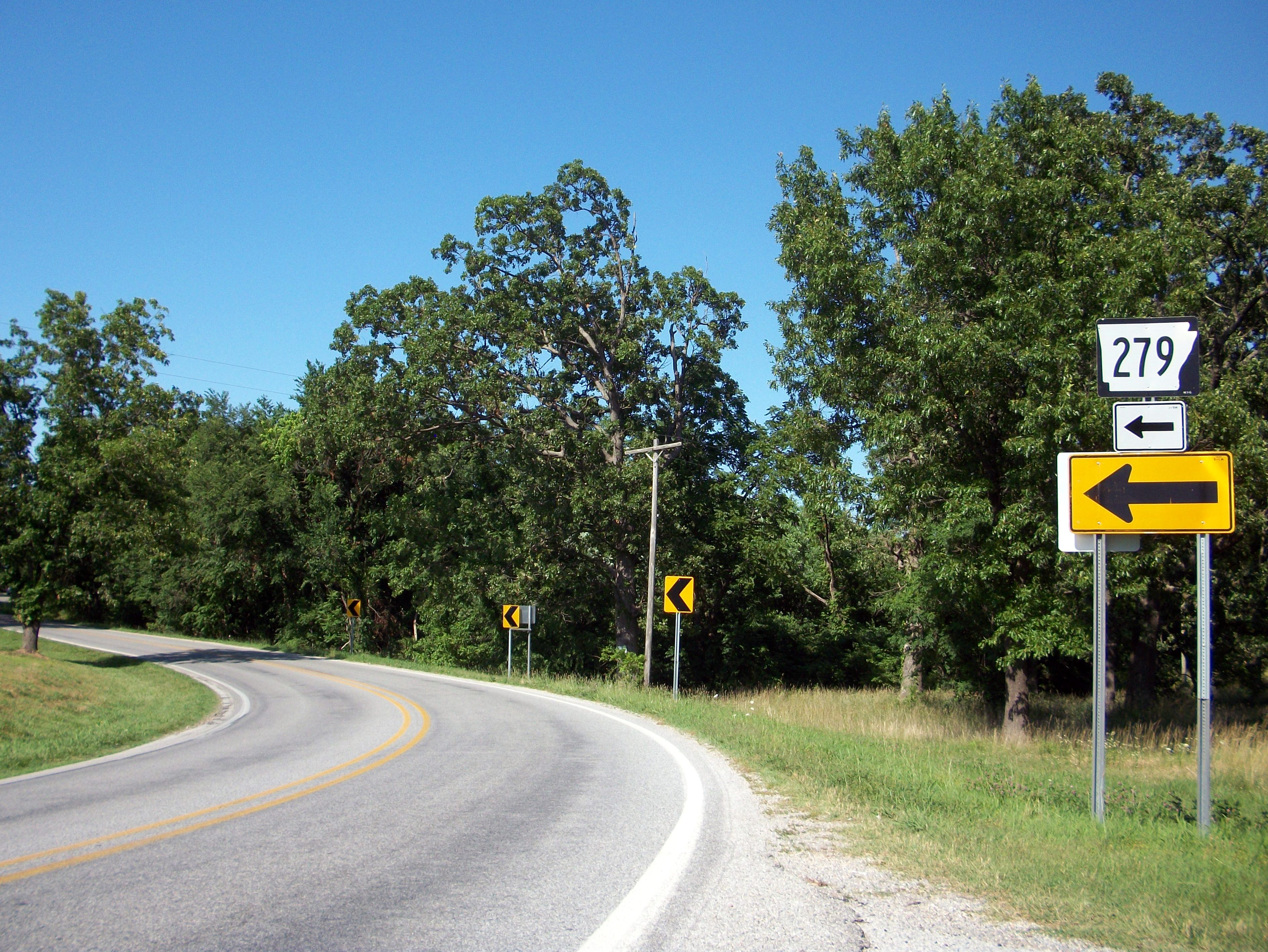
Highway 279 curves north toward Missouri, north of its junction with Highway 72.

The route begins at AR 12 near the Northwest Arkansas Regional Airport and runs north to intersect AR 102 in Centerton. These routes form a concurrency west until the Centerton city limits, when AR 279 turns north. AR 279 winds north through rural Benton County until intersecting AR 72 in Hiwasee near the Hiwasse Bank Building, which is listed on the National Register of Historic Places.

These routes briefly overlap in what the Arkansas State Highway and Transportation Department calls an officially designated exception for 0.52 miles (0.84 km). The AHTD began construction south of the Highway 72 junction in Hiwasse in May 2011 on a future junction along the Bella Vista Bypass, which is itself part of a long-range project to extend Interstate 49. The route continues north, winding through Bella Vista as Forest Hills Boulevard, serving as the western terminus for Lancashire Blvd in central Bella Vista. Highway 279 heads north to meet Missouri supplemental route OO at the Missouri state line, where it terminates. Route OO serves as a connector to AR 279 to US Route 71.

== Major intersections ==
Mile markers reset at concurrencies.The entire route is in Benton County.

Location	mi	km	Destinations	Notes
Vaughn	0.00	0.00	AR 12 (Regional Airport Boulevard) – Gentry, Rogers	
Centerton	3.05	4.91	AR 102 east (Centerton Blvd) – Bentonville	
Centerton	AR 102 concurrency west, 1.2 miles (1.9 km)			
Centerton	0.00	0.00	AR 12 west (Centerton Blvd)	
Hiwasse	5.51– 6.03	8.87– 9.70	AR 72	exception
Bella Vista	8.50	13.68	AR 340 east (Lancashire Blvd)	
Bella Vista	11.82	19.02	Route OO to US 71	Continuation beyond Missouri state line
1.000 mi = 1.609 km; 1.000 km = 0.621 mi: Concurrency terminus

== See also ==
- List of state highways in Arkansas
