= Hiwasse Bank Building =

- U.S. National Register of Historic Places
- Location within Arkansas Location within the United States
- Location: Main St., AR 279, Hiwasse, Arkansas
- Coordinates: 36°25′53″N 94°20′2″W
- Area: less than one acre
- Built: 1890
- MPS: Benton County MRA
- NRHP reference No.: 87002366
- Added to NRHP: January 28, 1988

The Hiwasse Bank Building is a historic commercial building in the rural community of Hiwasse, Arkansas. It is located on Arkansas Highway 279, a short way south of its junction with Arkansas Highway 72, abutting a similar but slightly newer commercial building. The building is a single-story brick building, with its front facade divided into three sections by iron stanchions. The left two bays have wood-frame windows in them, that on the right, the entrance flanked by sidelight windows and topped by a transom. Above these is a brick panel defined by a frame of corbelled brick. The interior has retained elements of its original pressed metal ceiling. Built c. 1890, it represents (despite deteriorating condition) the best of commercial architecture of that period in the small community.

The building was listed on the National Register of Historic Places in 1988.

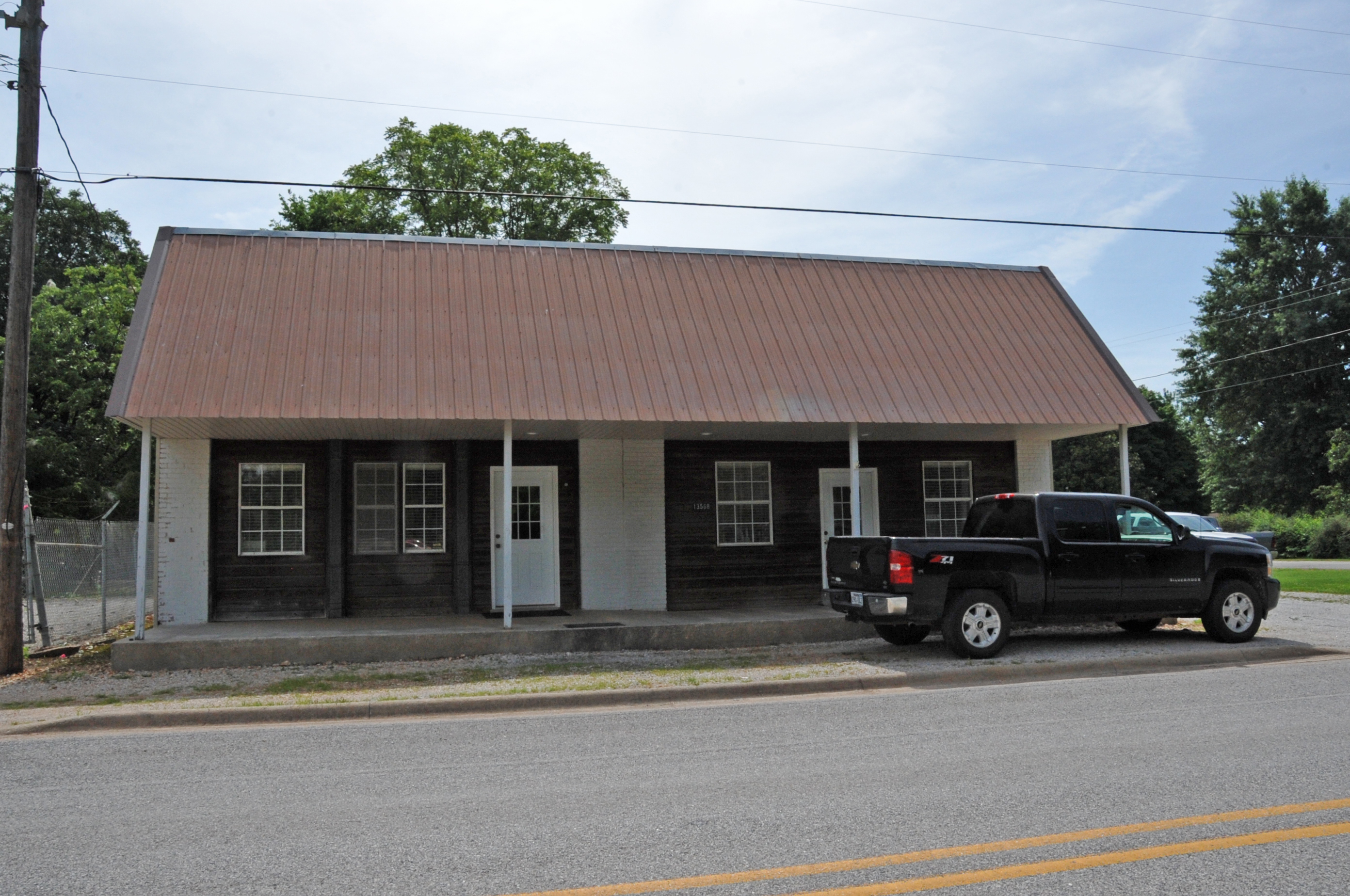
The bank may have been destroyed or extensively remodeled after extreme deterioration. This building stands on the site. (2015 photo)

== See also ==
- National Register of Historic Places listings in Benton County, Arkansas
