= Sexton, Arkansas =

- Ghost town
- Sexton's position in Arkansas.
- Coordinates: 35°54′55″N 94°30′25″W
- Country: United States
- State: Arkansas
- County: Washington
- Township: Dutch Mills
- Elevation: 1,014 ft (309 m)
- Time zone: UTC-6 (Central (CST))
  - Summer (DST): UTC-5 (CDT)
- Area code: 479
- GNIS feature ID: 81941

Sexton (also Salem Springs) is a former community in Dutch Mills Township, Washington County, Arkansas, United States. The community was located on a tributary of the Baron Fork (a tributary of the Illinois River) approximately one-half mile east of the Arkansas - Oklahoma state line.

A post office called Sexton was established in 1882, and remained in operation until 1906. The community has the name of William H. Sexton, an early postmaster.
