= Lincoln Consolidated School District (Arkansas) =

School district in Arkansas, United States

Address
- 117 Boyer Street Lincoln, Arkansas, 72744; United States

District information
- Type: Public
- Grades: PreK–12
- NCES District ID: 0508940

Students and staff
- Students: 1,050
- Teachers: 84.11
- Staff: 71.97
- Student–teacher ratio: 12.48

Other information
- Website: www.lincolncsd.com

Lincoln Consolidated School District, formerly Lincoln School District 48, is a school district based in Lincoln, Washington County, Arkansas.

Communities in its service area include, beside Lincoln, the census designated places of Canehill, Evansville, Morrow, and Summers. Additionally, it includes the following non-CDP unincorporated area of Dutch Mills. The district territory is 164 square miles (420 km^{2}).

== Schools ==
- Lincoln High School (9-12)
- Lincoln Middle School (4-8)
  - In 1998 a technology center serving the whole district opened here, and in 2012 the school's current building opened. The school also has the district-wide auditorium.
- Lincoln Elementary School (PreK-3)
  - In 2006 the campus expanded, and it was renovated in 2011.
