= Summers, Arkansas =

- Census-designated place
- Summers' position in Arkansas. Summers, Arkansas (the United States)
- Coordinates: 35°59′07″N 94°30′08″W
- Country: United States
- State: Arkansas
- County: Washington
- Elevation: 1,224 ft (373 m)

Population (2020)
  - Total: 166
- Time zone: UTC-6 (Central (CST))
  - Summer (DST): UTC-5 (CDT)
- Zip code: 72769
- Area code: 479
- GNIS feature ID: 2805687

Summers is an unincorporated community and census-designated place (CDP) in far western Washington County, Arkansas, United States. It was first listed as a CDP in the 2020 census with a population of 166.

The community has a postal designation (ZIP code 72769). It is part of the Northwest Arkansas region.

== Geography ==
Summers is in the Ozarks on the southern edge of the Springfield Plateau near the Boston Mountains. The community is located at the intersection of U.S. Route 62 with Arkansas Highway 59 about 2 miles (3.2 km) east of the Oklahoma border. It is just east of Ballard Creek.

== History ==
The community name comes from John T. Summers, one of the original postmasters for the community. The community was earlier named Coon Creek.

== Education ==
The community is served by the Lincoln Consolidated School District. Lincoln High School is its sole high school.

== Demographics ==
Historical population
| Census | Pop. | Note | %± |
|---|---|---|---|
| 2020 | 166 | | — |
U.S. Decennial Census; 2020

=== 2020 census ===
Summers CDP, Arkansas – Racial and ethnic composition Note: the US Census treats Hispanic/Latino as an ethnic category. This table excludes Latinos from the racial categories and assigns them to a separate category. Hispanics/Latinos may be of any race.
| Race / Ethnicity (NH = Non-Hispanic) | Pop 2020 | % 2020 |
|---|---|---|
| White alone (NH) | 118 | 71.08% |
| Black or African American alone (NH) | 0 | 0.00% |
| Native American or Alaska Native alone (NH) | 1 | 0.60% |
| Asian alone (NH) | 9 | 5.42% |
| Pacific Islander alone (NH) | 2 | 1.20% |
| Some Other Race alone (NH) | 1 | 0.60% |
| Mixed Race/Multi-Racial (NH) | 17 | 10.24% |
| Hispanic or Latino (any race) | 18 | 10.84% |
| Total | 166 | 100.00% |

== Transportation ==
As of 2023, there is no fixed route transit service in Summers, although Ozark Regional Transit operates a demand-response service in the area. The nearest intercity bus service is provided by Jefferson Lines in Fayetteville.

== Notable person ==
- George W. Bond was an educator born in Summers in 1891. He was president of Louisiana Tech University from 1928 to 1936.
