= Banks House (Hiwasse, Arkansas) =

Historic house in Arkansas, United States

- U.S. National Register of Historic Places
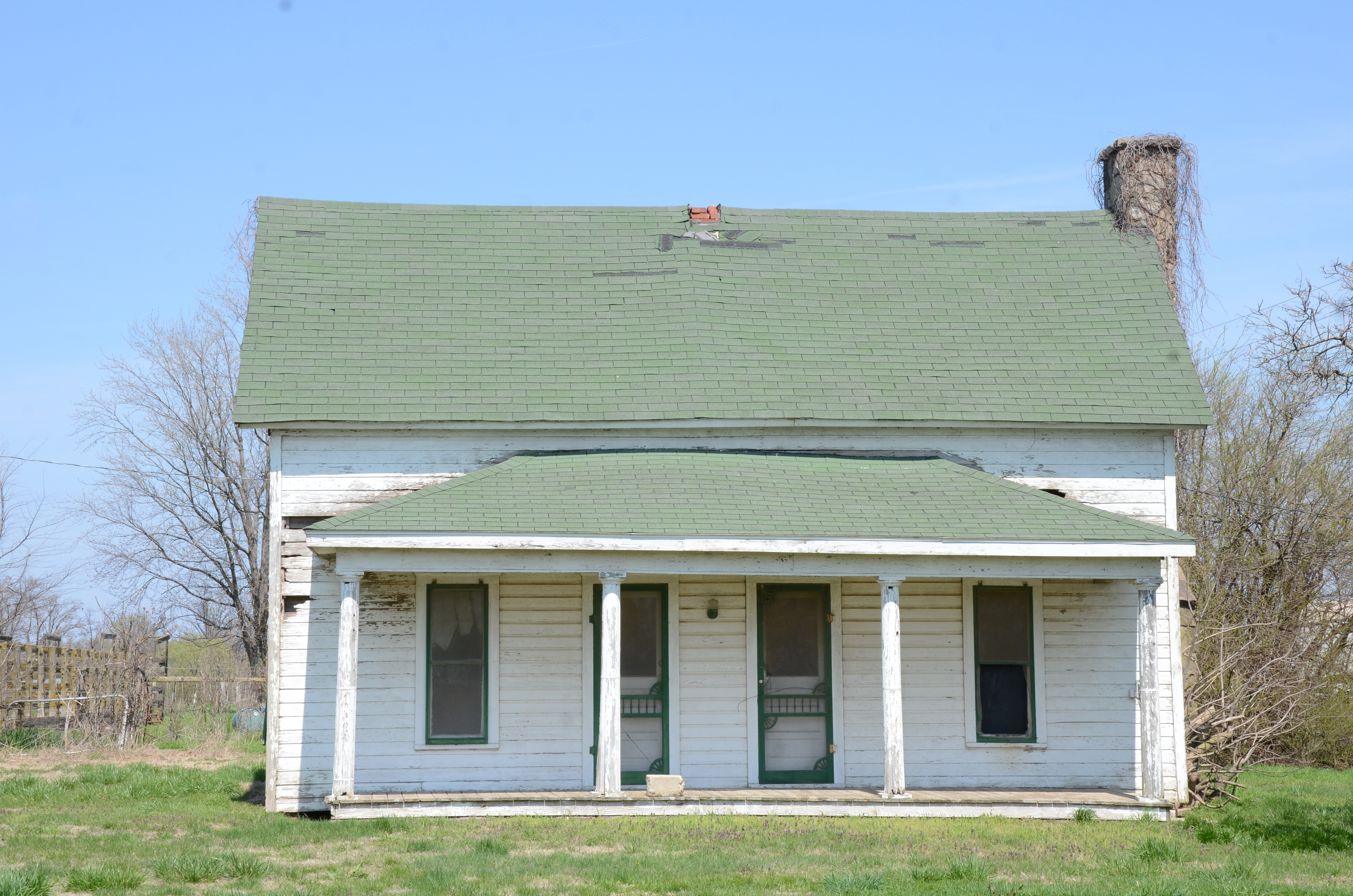

- Location within Arkansas Location within the United States
- Nearest city: Hiwassee, Arkansas
- Coordinates: 36°25′55″N 94°20′48″W
- Area: less than one acre
- Built: 1900
- Architectural style: Double-Pen;Duple
- MPS: Benton County MRA
- NRHP reference No.: 87002365
- Added to NRHP: January 28, 1988

The Banks House is a historic house on Arkansas Highway 72 west of Hiwasse, Arkansas. Built in 1900, it is a 1 1/2-story wood frame rendition of a double pen form more often found in log construction. It has weatherboard siding, a side gable main roof, and a wide single story front porch with round columns and a hip roof. A chimney rises at the eastern end, and an ell extends the house to the rear. It is a well-preserved local example of vernacular frontier architecture.

The house was listed on the National Register of Historic Places in 1988.

== See also ==
- National Register of Historic Places listings in Benton County, Arkansas
