= Adar House =

Historic house in Arkansas, United States

- U.S. National Register of Historic Places
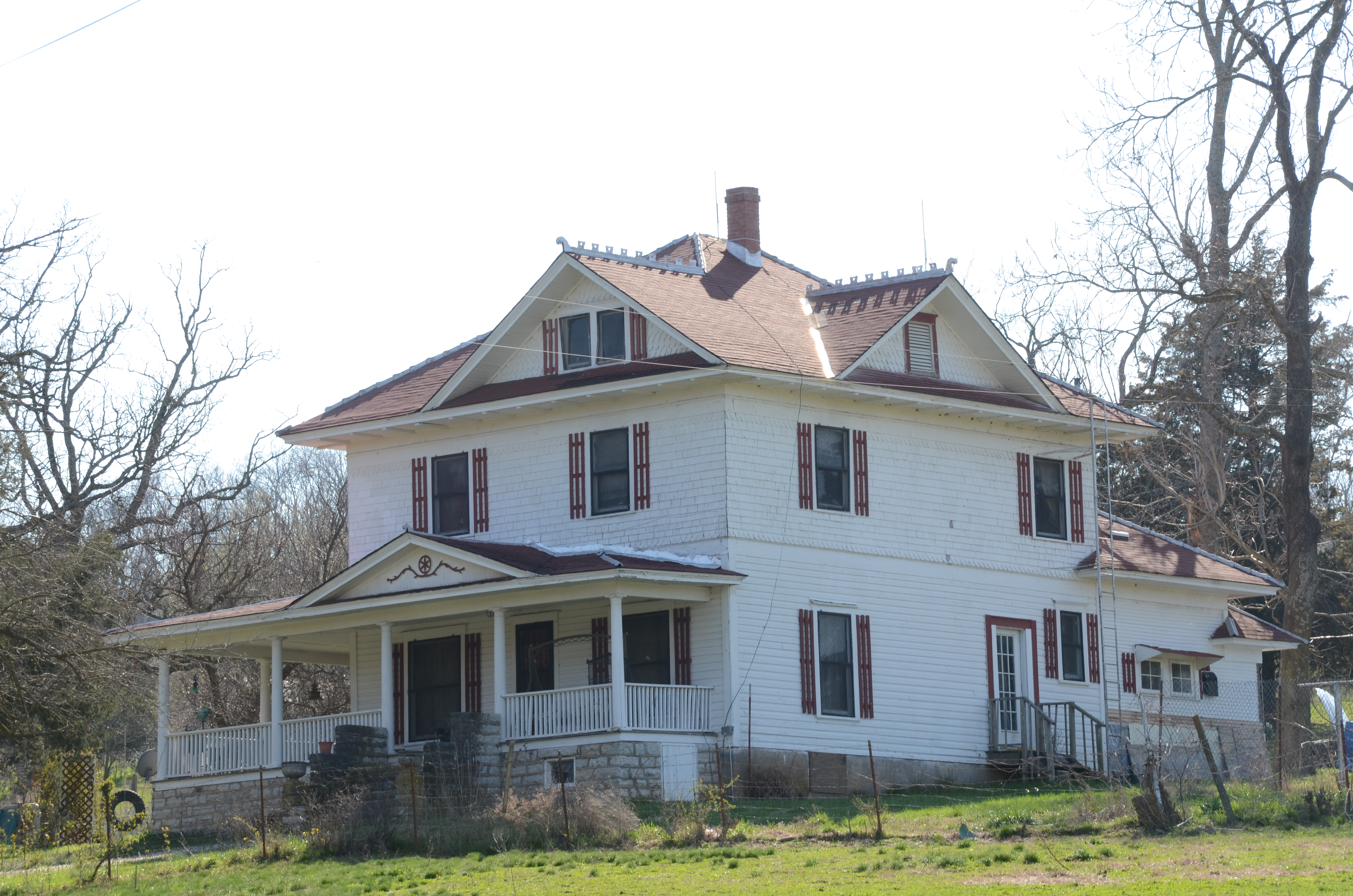

- Location within Arkansas Location within the United States
- Nearest city: Sulphur Springs, Arkansas
- Coordinates: 36°29′30″N 94°28′30″W
- Area: less than one acre
- Built: 1897
- MPS: Benton County MRA
- NRHP reference No.: 87002358
- Added to NRHP: March 25, 1988

The Adar House is a historic house outside Sulphur Springs, Benton County, Arkansas. It is located about 0.9 miles (1.4 km) northwest of the city, south of Arkansas Highway 59.

== Description and history ==
It is a two-story American Foursquare house with Classical Revival detailing, including a wraparound porch supported by Classical columns with an entablature, and a modillioned cornice under the roof. Built in 1897, it is a somewhat flamboyant expression of late Victorian styles for a rural setting.

The house was listed on the National Register of Historic Places on March 25, 1988.

== See also ==
- National Register of Historic Places listings in Benton County, Arkansas
