= Arkansas Highway 102 (1985–2007) =

Former state highway in Arkansas, United States

Highway 102
- Olrich Street

Route information
- Maintained by AHTD
- Length: 0.24 mi (390 m)
- Existed: November 7, 1985–February 21, 2007

Major junctions
- West end: US 71B in Rogers
- East end: End state maintenance at Olrich Street

Location
- Country: United States
- State: Arkansas

Highway system
- Arkansas Highway System; Interstate; US; State; Business; Spurs; Suffixed; Scenic; Heritage
← AR 102	→ AR 103

Highway 102 (AR 102, Ark. 102, Hwy. 102, and Olrich Street) is a former state highway in Rogers, Arkansas. Between 1985 and 2007, the highway was maintained by the Arkansas State Highway and Transportation Department (AHTD), now known as the Arkansas Department of Transportation (ArDOT).

== Route description ==
The highway began at US 71B in Rogers and ran east as Olrich Street to a poultry plant.

== History ==
Highway 102 was created upon the request of Rogers to provide a state maintained road for an industrial facility in the town in 1985. Rogers mayor Steve Womack requested the highway's maintenance responsibilities be turned over to city jurisdiction, a request granted by the Arkansas State Highway Commission on February 21, 2007.

== Major intersections ==
The entire route was in Rogers, Benton County.

mi	km	Destinations	Notes
0.0	0.0	US 71B (8th Street)	Western terminus
0.24	0.39	End state maintenance, road continued as Olrich Street	Eastern terminus
1.000 mi = 1.609 km; 1.000 km = 0.621 mi
