= Arkansas Highway 340 =

State highway in Arkansas, United States

Highway 340
- Lancashire Boulevard

Route information
- Maintained by AHTD
- Length: 9.21 mi (14.82 km)
- Existed: August 25, 1965–present

Major junctions
- West end: AR 279 in Bella Vista
- US 71 in Bella Vista
- East end: AR 94 in Bella Vista

Location
- Country: United States
- State: Arkansas
- Counties: Benton

Highway system
- Arkansas Highway System; Interstate; US; State; Business; Spurs; Suffixed; Scenic; Heritage
← AR 339	→ AR 341

Arkansas Highway 340 (AR 340) is an east–west state highway in Benton County, Arkansas. The route runs 9.21 miles (14.82 km) in Bella Vista from Highway 279 in the west to Highway 94 in the east. The route is entirely known as also Lancashire Boulevard.

== Route description ==
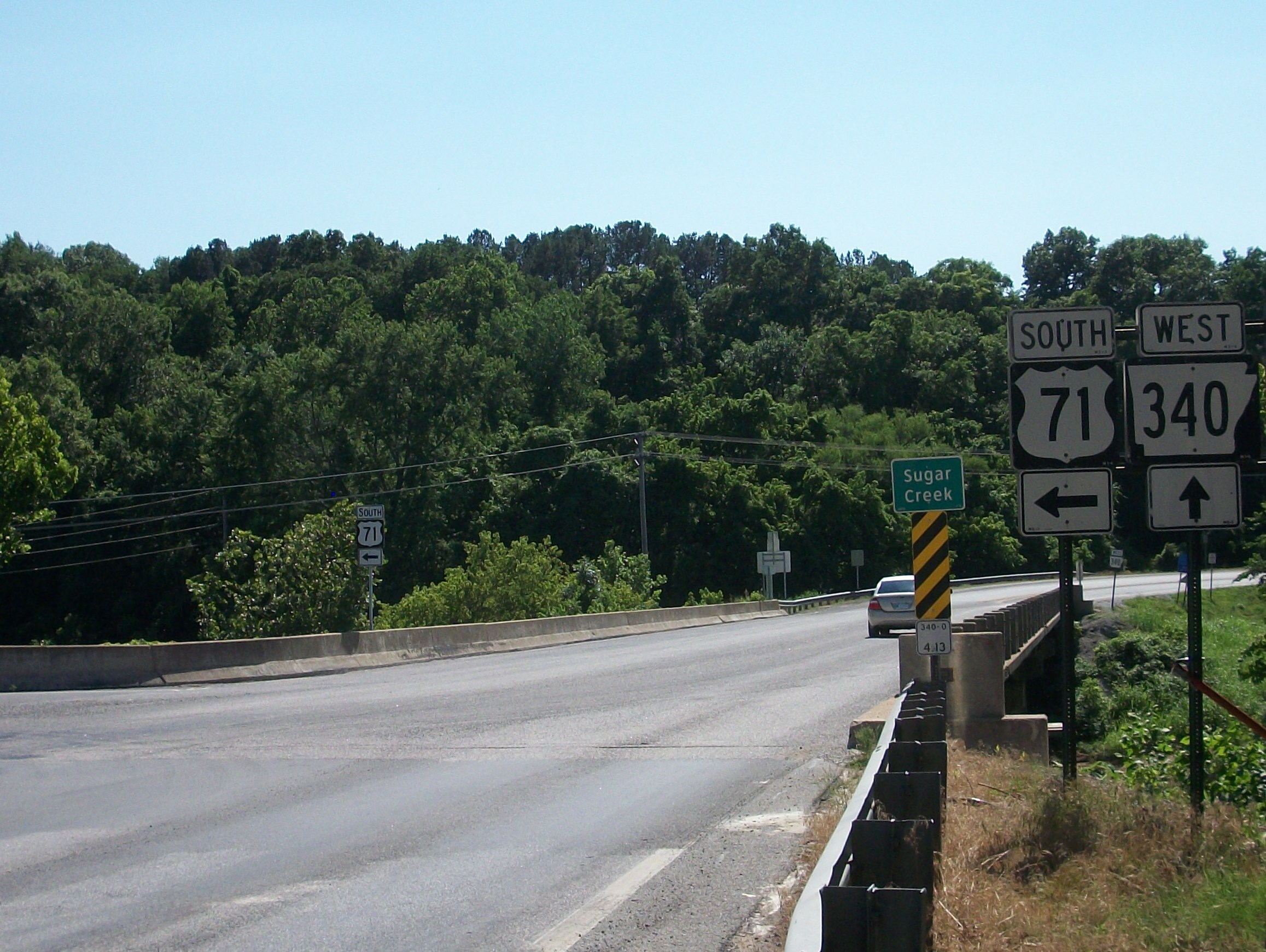
Highway 340 provides access to US 71 before trailing west into recently developed parts of Bella Vista.

Highway 340 begins in west Bella Vista at Forest Hills Boulevard near the Northwest Arkansas Community College Bella Vista campus. The route winds past numerous retirement communities and a few lakes on its way through the village. Approximately halfway along its length, Highway 340 intersects U.S. Route 71 (US 71), which is a four-lane expressway. The interchange with US 71 is unusual, with long ramps on the northbound side and cramped southbound ramps.

On the other side of US 71, the route runs near the Mildred B. Cooper Memorial Chapel, built by local architect E. Fay Jones (in similar style to the Thorncrown Chapel on the National Register of Historic Places). Highway 340 continues to wind northeast past communities and cul-de-sacs before meeting Pickens Rd, which continues briefly before becoming Missouri supplemental route E.

== History ==
The route was added to the state highway system on August 25, 1965. Described as the road from northeast of Hiwasse to the junction of Highway 94 at the Missouri state line, the routing has changed little since first designation.

== Major intersections ==
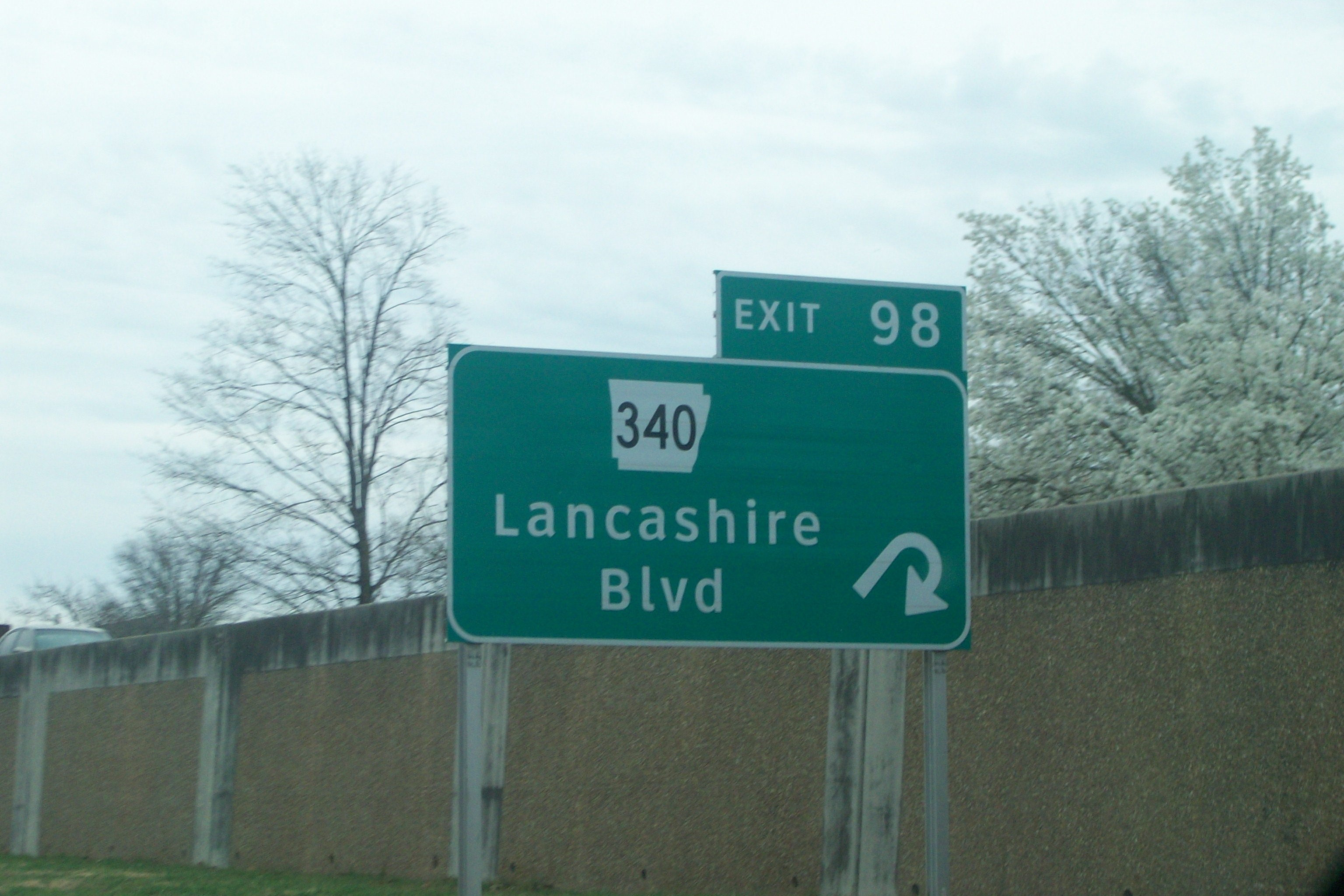
Sign denoting exit for Lancashire Boulevard from U.S. Route 71. The exit is a 180 degree curve signed for 20 mph (32 km/h).

The entire route is in Bella Vista, Benton County.

mi	km	Destinations	Notes
0.00	0.00	AR 279 (Forest Hills Boulevard)	Western terminus
4.26	6.86	US 71 – Joplin, Fayetteville	Exit 98 on US 71
9.21	14.82	AR 94 (Pickens Road) – Pea Ridge	Eastern terminus
1.000 mi = 1.609 km; 1.000 km = 0.621 mi

== See also ==
- List of state highways in Arkansas
