= Lincoln High School (Lincoln, Arkansas) =

Location
- 1392 East Pridemore Drive; Lincoln, Arkansas 72744; United States; 35.9563°N 94.4199°W

Information
- Type: Secondary school
- Motto: Where All Belong – All Learn – All Succeed
- Established: 1947 (79 years ago)
- School district: Lincoln Consolidated School District
- NCES District ID: 0508940
- Superintendent: Mary-Ann Spears
- CEEB code: 041405
- NCES School ID: 050894001569
- Principal: Stan Karber
- Teaching staff: 44.63 (on FTE basis)
- Enrollment: 359 (2023–2024)
- Student to teacher ratio: 8.04
- Colors: Maroon & white (main); Gold, silver, gray, black (secondary)
- Athletics conference: 4A Region 1 (2012–14)
- Mascot: The Lincoln Wolves
- Teams: Basketball, baseball, softball, football, cheer, track, golf, bowling, volleyball, mountain bBiking
- Team name: Lincoln Wolfpack
- Website: www.lincolncsd.com/o/lhs

Lincoln High School is a public secondary school in Lincoln, Arkansas, United States. Lincoln is one of ten public high schools in Washington County, Arkansas and is the only high school administered by the Lincoln Consolidated School District.

Communities in the district's service area include the census designated places of Canehill, Evansville, Morrow, and Summers. Additionally, the service area includes the non-CDP unincorporated area of Dutch Mills. The district territory is 164 square miles (420 km^{2}).

== History ==
The current building opened in 2012.

== Academics ==
Lincoln High School academics are divided into the following departments: English Language Arts, Science, Mathematics, Social Studies, P.E./Health Vocational Education, and Fine Arts. The school offers Advanced Placement (AP) and Pre-AP courses in English, Biology, United States History, Environmental Science, and Psychology. Lincoln High school is a member of the Teacher Advancement Program, a program that seeks to "close achievement gaps and ensure a quality educational opportunity for all students."

The assumed course of study follows the Smart Core curriculum developed by the Arkansas Department of Education (ADE). Students complete regular and career focus courses and exams and may select Advanced Placement (AP) coursework and exams that provide an opportunity to receive college credit.

== Extracurricular activities ==
The Lincoln High School mascot and athletic emblem is the wolves with maroon and white serving as the primary school colors.

=== Athletics ===
For 2012–14, the Lincoln Wolves compete in the 4A Classification within the 4A Region 1 Conference as administered by Arkansas Activities Association. Lincoln High School competes in football, volleyball, golf (boys/girls), golf (boys/girls), cross country (boys/girls), basketball (boys/girls), track (boys/girls), competitive cheer, cheer, competitive dance, dance, baseball, softball and bowling (boys/girls).

=== Clubs and organizations ===
The FFA chapter at Lincoln has won the following state championships since 2005: Poultry Science, Food Science, Farm Business Management, Prepared Speaking, Creed, Horse Evaluation, and Milk Quality and Products. In 2012, Lincoln won the National FFA Horse Evaluation Career Development Event.

== Statistics ==
Lincoln High School serves grades 9–12. In the 2010–11 school year, LHS had 360 students enrolled.

== Notable alumni ==
- Lee Isaac Chung — director of Minari
