= Tolu, Arkansas =

- Unincorporated community
- Tolu's position in Arkansas Tolu, Arkansas (the United States)
- Coordinates: 35°48′52.3″N 94°29′42.8″W
- Country: United States
- State: Arkansas
- County: Washington
- Township: Vineyard
- Elevation: 1,093 ft (333 m)
- Time zone: UTC-6 (Central (CST))
  - Summer (DST): UTC-5 (CDT)
- ZIP code: 72729
- Area code: 479
- GNIS feature ID: 78565

Tolu is an unincorporated community in Vineyard Township in western Washington County, Arkansas, United States. It is located at the intersection of Highway 59 and Bellamy Road (Washington County Road 1023) about one half mile from the Arkansas - Oklahoma border. The community of Evansville lies approximately 1.3 miles to the south, across Evansville Creek.

A post office was established at Tolu in 1887, and closed in 1902.
