= Wee Pine Knot =

Historic house in Arkansas, United States

- U.S. National Register of Historic Places
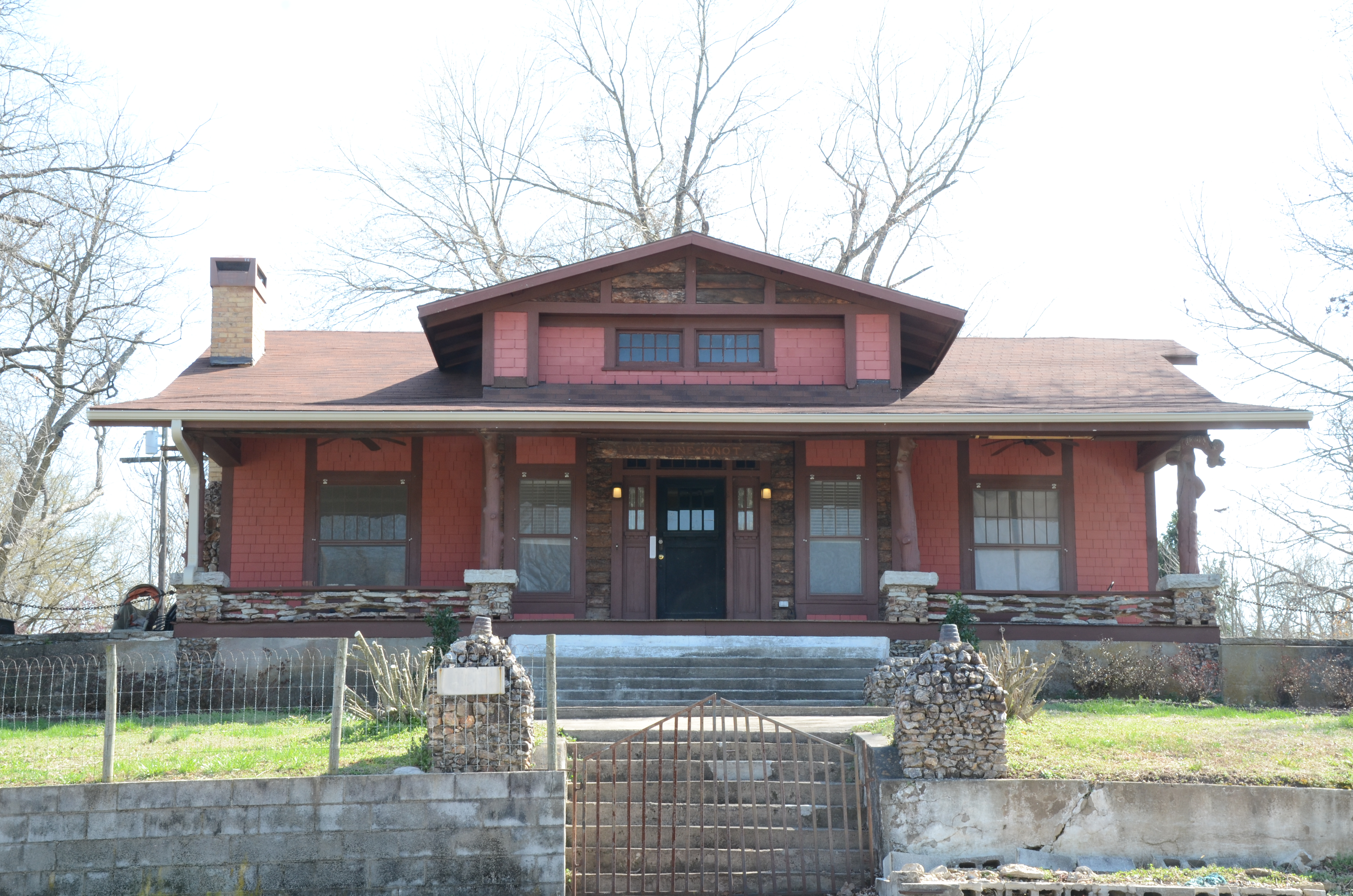

- Location within Arkansas Location within the United States
- Location: 319 Spring St., Sulphur Springs, Benton County, Arkansas
- Coordinates: 36°29′16″N 94°27′42″W
- Area: 1 acre (0.40 ha)
- Built: 1919
- Architectural style: Bungalow/craftsman, Rustic
- MPS: Benton County MRA
- NRHP reference No.: 98001632
- Added to NRHP: January 21, 1999

Wee Pine Knot, located at 319 Spring Street in Sulphur Springs, Benton County, Arkansas, is a historic single-story wood-frame house with peeled-log and half-timbered siding. Constructed in 1918-19 by Warren Prickett as a summer retreat, the house also includes a garage with log siding. The front porch is crafted from stacked rock, which is also used for the support piers, half-wall, and the base of the chimney. Inside, the house showcases Craftsman-style woodwork and pine flooring, making it a notable local example of Craftsman and Rustic architecture.

The house was listed on the National Register of Historic Places in 1999.

== See also ==
- National Register of Historic Places listings in Benton County, Arkansas
