= Arkansas Highway 94 =

State highway in Arkansas

Highway 94
- AR 94 in red, AR 94S in blue

Route information
- Maintained by ArDOT
- Length: 22.07 mi (35.52 km)
- Existed: 1926–present

Major junctions
- West end: Horseshoe Bend Park
- US 71B in Rogers; US 62 / AR 12 in Rogers; AR 72 in Pea Ridge
- East end: Route E at the Missouri state line near Bella Vista

Location
- Country: United States
- State: Arkansas
- Counties: Benton

Highway system
- Arkansas Highway System; Interstate; US; State; Business; Spurs; Suffixed; Scenic; Heritage
| ← AR 93 | → AR 95 |

Highway 94 (AR 94, Ark. 94, and Hwy. 94) is an east–west state highway in Benton County, Arkansas. The route of 22.07 miles (35.52 km) runs from Horseshoe Bend Park near Beaver Lake west (Note: Although Arkansas highways normally run from south to north and from west to east, the Benton County Route and Sections Map indicates that Highway 94 begins at Horseshoe Bend Park and runs west to the Missouri state line.) across US Route 71 Business (US 71B) and US 62 to Missouri Supplemental Route E at the Missouri state line. The route is maintained by the Arkansas State Highway and Transportation Department (AHTD).

== Route description ==
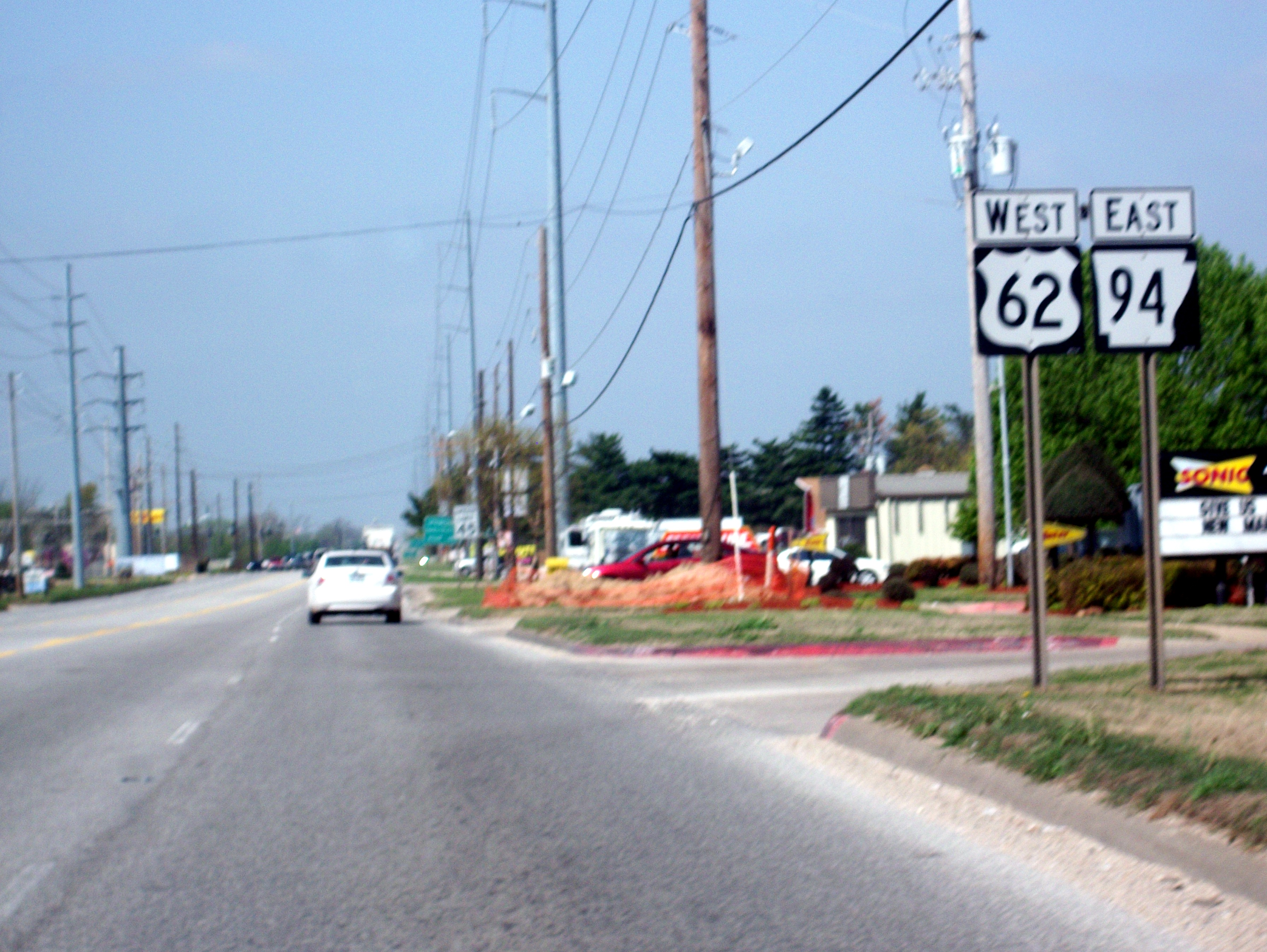
Highway 94 runs concurrent with US 62 and Highway 12 briefly in Rogers. (Highway 12 is unsigned)

The route begins at Horseshoe Bend Park on Beaver Lake and runs northwest. The route meets a spur route that runs to Monte Ne before meeting U.S. Route 71B (US 71B) in Rogers. The route runs north concurrently with US 71B until New Hope Road. US 71B turns left and Highway 94 continues north as 8th Street until a junction with US 62 in north Rogers. Highway 94 continues along an officially designated exception of 0.38 miles (0.61 km) with US 62. The overlap ends at a junction with Highway 12 where Highway 94 turns left, and US 62 continues straight ahead to Eureka Springs.

Highway 94 runs north through Little Flock into Pea Ridge, where the route intersects Highway 72. North of the Highway 72 junction, Highway 94 meets Highway 265 before terminating at Missouri supplemental route E at the Missouri state line.

== Major intersections ==
The entire route is in Benton County.

| Location | mi | km | Destinations | Notes |
|---|---|---|---|---|
| | 0.00 | 0.00 | Horseshoe Bend Park | Eastern terminus |
| Monte Ne | 4.0 | 6.4 | AR 94S | AR 94S northern terminus |
| Rogers | | | AR 265 south | AR 265 northern terminus |
| Rogers | | | US 71B (S. 8th Street / W. Walnut Street) – Springdale | |
| Rogers | 1.56– 1.94 | 2.51– 3.12 | US 62 / AR 12 east | Officially designated exception |
| Pea Ridge | 8.24 | 13.26 | AR 72 west – Bentonville | Southern terminus of AR 72 overlap |
| Pea Ridge | 9.04 | 14.55 | AR 72 east – Harrison | Northern terminus of AR 72 overlap |
| Pea Ridge | 0.53 | 0.85 | AR 265 north (Hayden Road) | AR 265 southern terminus |
| Bella Vista | 6.14 | 9.88 | AR 340 west (Lancashire Boulevard) to US 71 | AR 340 eastern terminus |
| | 6.21 | 9.99 | Route E | Western terminus |
1.000 mi = 1.609 km; 1.000 km = 0.621 mi: Concurrency terminus

== Monte Ne spur ==
Highway 94S
- Location: Monte Ne
- Length: 0.92 mi (1,480 m)

Highway 94 Spur (AR 94S, Ark. 94S, and Hwy. 94S) is an east–west state highway spur route to Monte Ne. The route of 0.92 miles (1.48 km) serves to connect the former tourist destination to the state highway system via Highway 94.

=== Major intersections ===
The entire route is in Benton County.

| Location | mi | km | Destinations | Notes |
|---|---|---|---|---|
| | 0.00 | 0.00 | AR 94 | Western terminus |
| Monte Ne | 0.92 | 1.48 | Beaver Lake | Eastern terminus |
1.000 mi = 1.609 km; 1.000 km = 0.621 mi
