= Lee Creek, Arkansas =

Unincorporated community in Arkansas, US

Lee Creek is an unincorporated community in Crawford County, Arkansas, lying along Highway 220 and Lee Creek north of Cedarville.

== History ==
A variant name was "Cove City". The community was platted in 1880 as "Cove City". The present name is after nearby Lee Creek. A proposal to officially change the town's name to "Leescreek" failed in the 1960s.
