= Weddington, Arkansas =

Coordinates: 36.08925°N 94.41966°W

Location of Weddington within the state of Arkansas.

Weddington is an unincorporated community in Washington County, in the U.S. state of Arkansas.

== History ==
A variant name was "Wedington". A post office called Wedington was established in 1879, and remained in operation until 1906. The community was named after a local family of pioneer settlers.
