= Lincoln, Arkansas =

- City
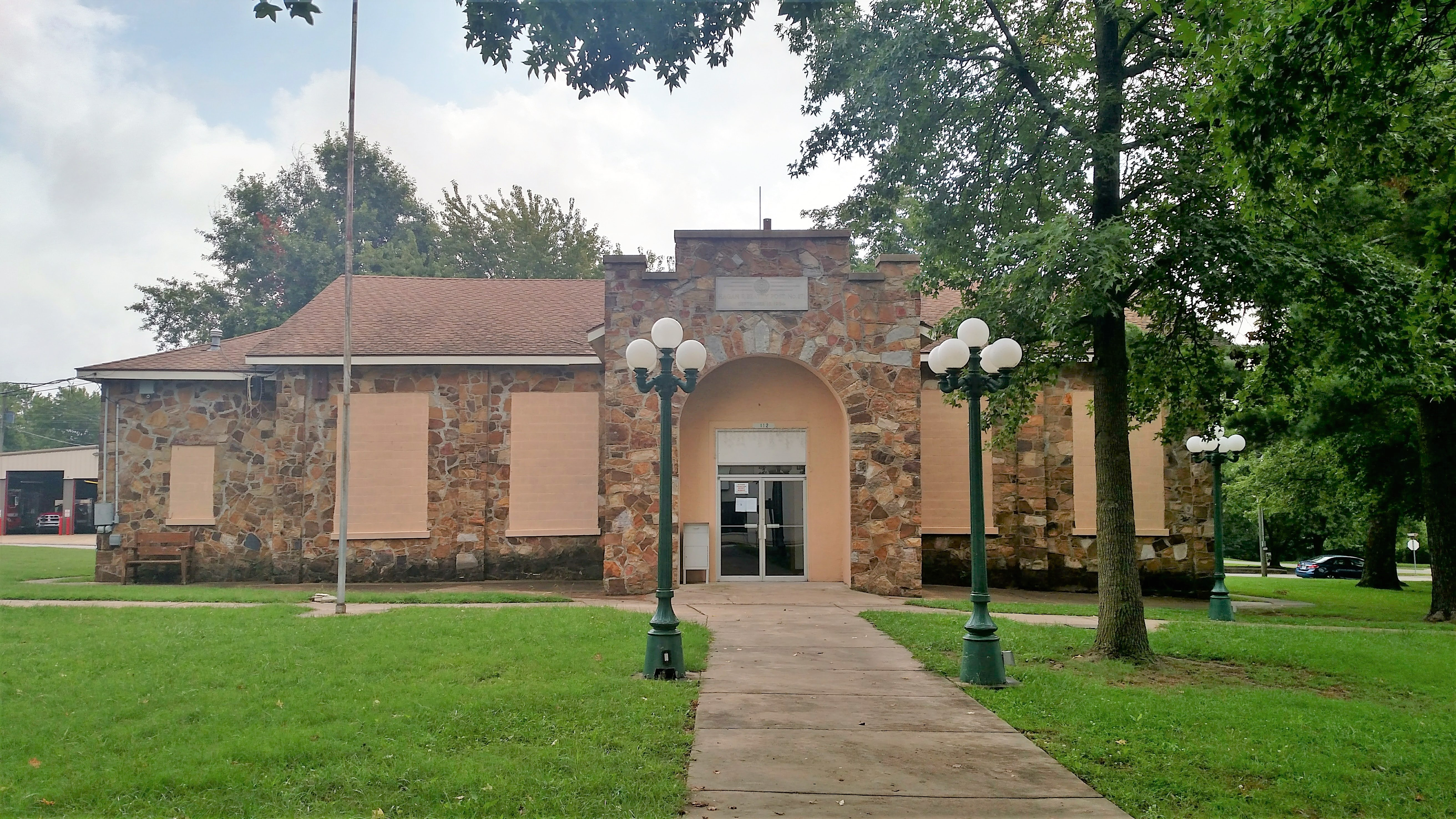
- Lincoln City Square
- Nickname: Apple Capital of Arkansas
- Location of Lincoln in Washington County, Arkansas.
- Coordinates: 35°56′56″N 94°25′03″W
- Country: United States
- State: Arkansas
- County: Washington
- Incorporated city: November 23, 1907
- Named for: Abraham Lincoln

Government
  - Type: Mayor-council
  - Mayor: Doug Hutchens

Area
  - City: 2.89 sq mi (7.49 km^{2})
  - Land: 2.86 sq mi (7.42 km^{2})
  - Water: 0.027 sq mi (0.07 km^{2})
- Elevation: 1,453 ft (443 m)

Population (2020)
  - City: 2,294
  - Estimate (2025): 2,370 ▲
  - Density: 800.4/sq mi (309.05/km^{2})
  - Metro: 534,904
- Time zone: UTC−6 (Central (CST))
  - Summer (DST): UTC−5 (CDT)
- ZIP code: 72744
- Area code: 479
- FIPS code: 05-39970
- GNIS feature ID: 2404930
- Website: www.lincolnarkansas.com
- NWA metro population as of 2019

Lincoln is a city in Washington County, Arkansas, United States. The population was 2,294 at the 2020 census. It is part of the Northwest Arkansas metro area.

== History ==
=== Establishment ===
The area around Lincoln first saw white settlement in the late 1820s. It was first known as Blackjack after the blackjack oaks used to build the first schoolhouse. Joseph Carter built the first store in the area in 1874, still known as Blackjack. A nearby community on Beaty Mountain known as Mt. Hayes was settled in 1877. Starr Hill Township was also organized in the area during this period. The settlements drifted together and continued to grow until applying for a post office in 1884 within Carter's store under the name Georgetown. The name was rejected; the postal service not wanting to duplicate Georgetown in White County, Arkansas (or Georgetown, Madison County, Arkansas). Carter submitted Lincoln as the new name. He said he chose the name seemingly at random, having "seen it on a box", but others were skeptical that Carter had wanted to name the community for Abraham Lincoln all along, as he was a "Republican from the North". Local acceptance for the name Lincoln was slow during the Reconstruction era following the bitter Civil War.

The settlement remained unincorporated until the St. Louis–San Francisco Railway (commonly called the Frisco) planned a branch line (the Ozark and Cherokee Central Railway [O&CC]) between Fayetteville and Oklahoma. The right-of-way acquisition process brought a railroad agent through town, and he platted a town on 22 acres (8.9 ha) south of the proposed railroad in 1903, but modified the plat in 1907. Following this plat, the city of Lincoln was incorporated on November 23, 1907.

== Geography ==
According to the United States Census Bureau, the city has a total area of 2.87 square miles (7.4 km^{2}).

Lincoln is about 25 miles southwest of Fayetteville and approximately eight miles east of the Arkansas-Oklahoma border.

=== Protected areas ===
Lincoln Lake, a few miles north of the city, is a 400-acre (160 ha) park surrounding the 90-acre (36 ha) municipally owned lake formerly used for water supply. The park offers 8 miles (13 km) of hiking and mountain biking trails, fishing, and non-motorized boating.

=== Region ===
The Northwest Arkansas region consists of three Arkansas counties: Benton, Madison, and Washington. The area had a population of 347,045 at the 2000 census which had increased to 463,204 by the 2010 Census (an increase of 33.47 percent). The region does not consist of the usual principal-city-with-suburbs morphology. The principal cities retain individual identities, but have grown together along Interstate 49 (I-49). For more than the last decade, Northwest Arkansas has been one of the fastest-growing regions in the United States.

== Demographics ==
Historical population
Census	Pop.	Note	%±
1910	292		—
1920	534		82.9%
1930	687		28.7%
1940	720		4.8%
1950	771		7.1%
1960	820		6.4%
1970	1,023		24.8%
1980	1,422		39.0%
1990	1,460		2.7%
2000	1,752		20.0%
2010	2,249		28.4%
2020	2,294		2.0%
2025 (est.)	2,370	▲	3.3%
U.S. Decennial Census

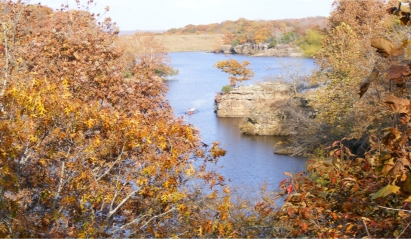
Lincoln Lake is located on the north side of town and is part of the city parks and recreation

=== 2020 census ===
As of the 2020 census, Lincoln had a population of 2,294. The median age was 36.6 years. 26.5% of residents were under the age of 18 and 16.0% of residents were 65 years of age or older. For every 100 females there were 91.0 males, and for every 100 females age 18 and over there were 88.0 males age 18 and over.

0.0% of residents lived in urban areas, while 100.0% lived in rural areas.

There were 892 households in Lincoln, of which 33.2% had children under the age of 18 living in them. Of all households, 44.5% were married-couple households, 17.8% were households with a male householder and no spouse or partner present, and 30.4% were households with a female householder and no spouse or partner present. About 29.0% of all households were made up of individuals and 14.3% had someone living alone who was 65 years of age or older.

There were 1,005 housing units, of which 11.2% were vacant. The homeowner vacancy rate was 4.7% and the rental vacancy rate was 7.0%.

Racial composition as of the 2020 census
Race	Number	Percent
White	1,748	76.2%
Black or African American	16	0.7%
American Indian and Alaska Native	64	2.8%
Asian	24	1.0%
Native Hawaiian and Other Pacific Islander	2	0.1%
Some other race	48	2.1%
Two or more races	392	17.1%
Hispanic or Latino (of any race)	194	8.5%

=== 2000 census ===
As of the 2000 United States census, there were 1,752 people, 723 households, and 472 families residing in the city. The population density was 983.2 inhabitants per square mile (379.6/km^{2}). There were 798 housing units at an average density of 447.8 per square mile (172.9/km^{2}). The racial makeup of the city was 91.78% White, 2.57% Native American, 0.06% Asian, 2.57% from other races, and 3.03% from two or more races. 5.08% of the population were Hispanic or Latino of any race.

There were 723 households, out of which 29.7% had children under the age of 18 living with them, 50.2% were married couples living together, 12.0% had a female householder with no husband present, and 34.7% were non-families. 30.8% of all households were made up of individuals, and 17.0% had someone living alone who was 65 years of age or older. The average household size was 2.42 and the average family size was 3.00.

In the city, the age distribution of the population shows 26.7% under the age of 18, 8.6% from 18 to 24, 26.7% from 25 to 44, 21.3% from 45 to 64, and 16.8% who were 65 years of age or older. The median age was 35 years. For every 100 females, there were 88.6 males. For every 100 females age 18 and over, there were 84.1 males.

The median income for a household in the city was $27,639, and the median income for a family was $37,102. Males had a median income of $26,860 versus $18,958 for females. The per capita income for the city was $14,232. About 12.7% of families and 15.8% of the population were below the poverty line, including 18.5% of those under age 18 and 11.8% of those age 65 or over.

== Government ==
=== Mayor–city council ===
Lincoln operates within the mayor-city council form of government. The mayor is elected by a citywide election to serve as the chief executive officer (CEO) of the city by presiding over all city functions, policies, and ordinances. Once elected, the mayor also allocates duties to city employees. The Lincoln mayoral election takes place during the United States midterm elections. Mayors serve four-year terms and can serve unlimited terms. The city council is the unicameral legislative of the city, consisting of eight city council members. Also included in the council's duties is balancing the city's budget and passing ordinances. Two city council members are elected from each of the city's four wards.

== Human resources ==
=== Education ===
==== Primary and secondary education ====
The community is served by the Lincoln Consolidated School District. Successful completion of the curriculum leads to graduation from Lincoln High School. The high school and athletics complex were built in 2012 for $16.2 million. The district briefly operated a district conversion charter school known as the Lincoln Academic Center of Excellence until 2012.

==== Higher education ====
Lincoln does not contain any higher education institutions, but is in proximity to the University of Arkansas in Fayetteville and Northwest Arkansas Community College Washington County Campus in Springdale.

==== Library ====
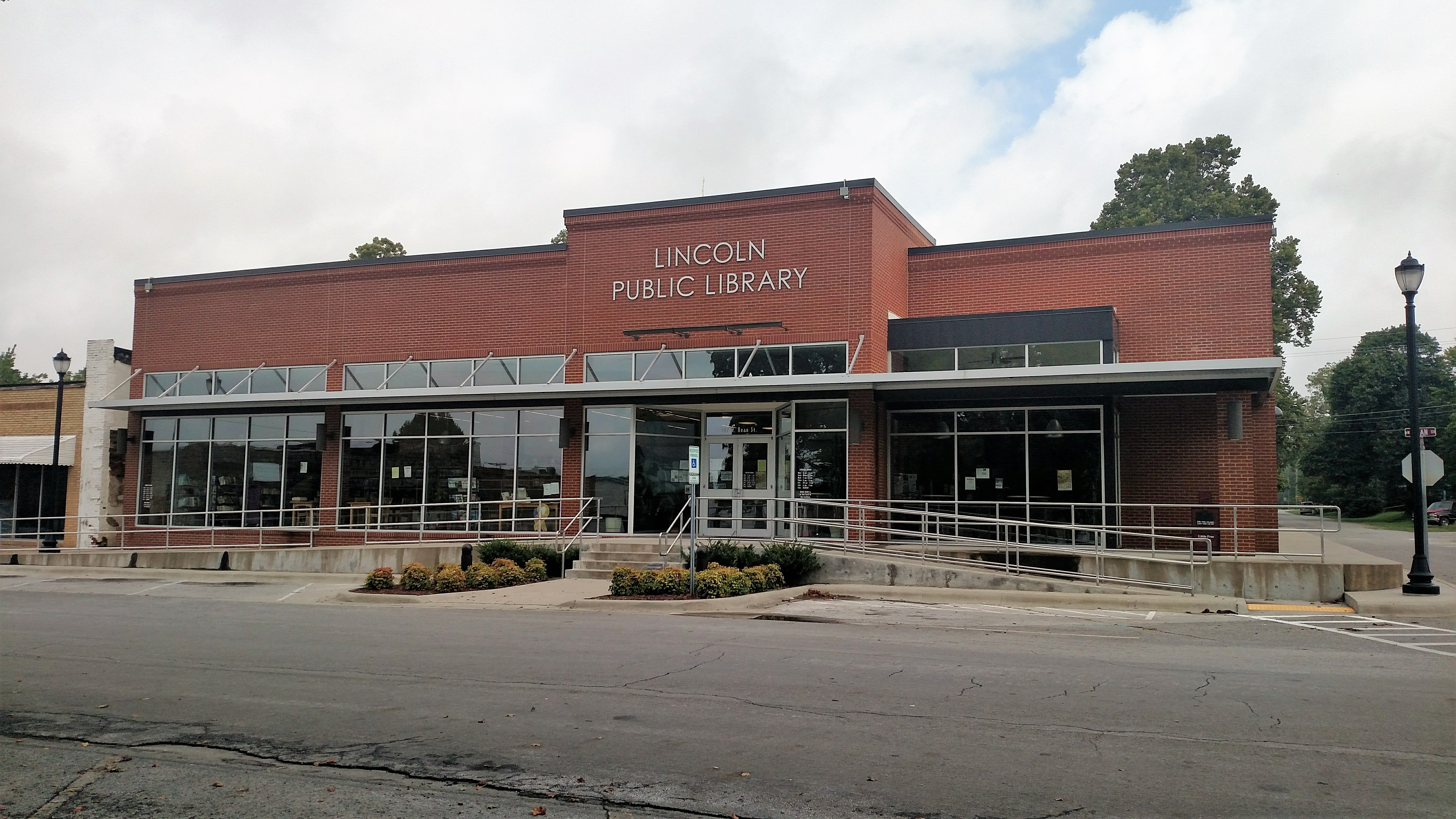
Lincoln Public Library

Lincoln Public Library was demolished and rebuilt thanks to a bond, grants, and in-kind services. It is 10,200+ square feet, features 108 computers, tablets, and laptops. The public library has two meetings rooms, a demonstration kitchen, genealogy section and free internet extending into the square. The library is a member of the Washington County Library System.

=== Public safety ===
The Lincoln Police Department is the primary law enforcement agency in the city. The department has five officers as of 2018.

Superseding district court jurisdiction is the 4th Judicial Circuit Court, which covers Washington and Madison counties. The 4th Circuit contains eight circuit judges, elected to six-year terms circuitwide.

== Culture ==
Lincoln is home to the Arkansas Country Doctor Museum, which includes a collection of medical instruments and personal artifacts from the 1930s to 1980s.

=== Annual cultural events ===
The Lincoln Riding Club has hosted an annual rodeo since 1953. The three-day event begins with a parade and typically includes bull riding, calf roping, barrel racing, steer wrestling, a beauty pageant, and a street dance.

Lincoln is home to the Arkansas Apple Festival, held annually since 1976 during the first weekend of October. Echoing the former prominence of apple growing in the Lincoln vicinity, vendors offer food, arts and crafts of the Ozarks for visitors in downtown Lincoln.

Local Apple farmers developed the following in the Area.

- Collins' Red (aka Collins, Champion Red, Champion, Reagan's Red)—found by chance in a field near Lincoln; commercially propagated around 1886; a good colored fruit which keeps well, if kept properly
- Howard Sweet—the seedling is thought to have come from Earls Holt's Cane Hill nursery after the Civil War; grown near Cincinnati, Arkansas by Mr. Howard; a sweet, highly colored dessert apple; the tree has a heavy bloom
- Oliver Red (aka Oliver, Senator)—originated in Washington County; a yellow-skinned fruit washed with bright red; harvested in early September; a good dessert apple

== Transportation ==
As of 2023, there is no fixed route transit service in Lincoln. Ozark Regional Transit operates demand-response service in the city. The nearest intercity bus service is provided by Jefferson Lines in nearby Fayetteville.

== In Film ==
The film Minari, a semi-autobiographical take on film director Lee Isaac Chung's upbringing, is set in Lincoln. Originally filmed on a ranch near Tulsa Oklahoma, the film follows a family of South Korean immigrants who try to make it in the rural United States during the 1980s.

== Notable people ==
- Lee Isaac Chung is an American film director and screenwriter. His debut feature Munyurangabo (2007) was an Official Selection at the 2007 Cannes Film Festival.
- Ryan Mallett, former National Football League and Arkansas Razorbacks quarterback, attended elementary school at Lincoln Consolidated School District, where his father Jim was a coach, and his mother Debbie was a teacher.
