= Figure Five, Arkansas =

- Unincorporated community
- Location within Arkansas Location within the United States
- Coordinates: 35°31′1″N 94°21′14″W
- Country: United States
- State: Arkansas
- County: Crawford
- Elevation: 915 ft (279 m)
- Time zone: UTC-6 (Central (CST))
  - Summer (DST): UTC-5 (CDT)
- GNIS feature ID: 71611

Figure Five is an unincorporated community in Crawford County, Arkansas, United States.

The community was named for the fact it was 5 miles (8.0 km) from Van Buren, a figure noted in nearby blazes.
