= Evansville, Arkansas =

- Census-designated place
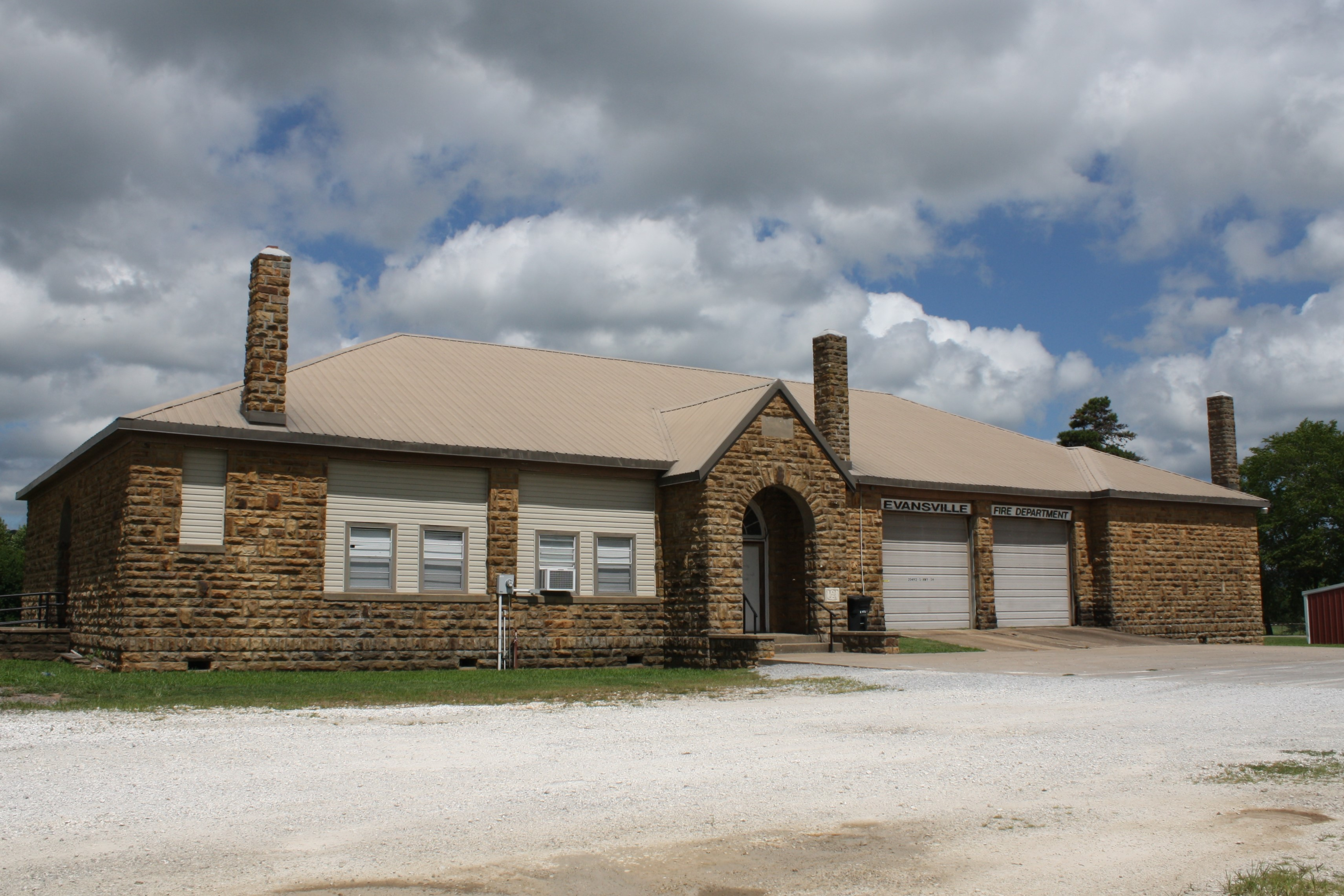
- Community Center

- Evansville's position in Arkansas. Evansville, Arkansas (the United States)
- Coordinates: 35°47′32″N 94°29′27″W
- Country: United States
- State: Arkansas
- County: Washington
- Township: Vineyard
- Elevation: 1,224 ft (373 m)

Population (2020)
  - Total: 102
- Time zone: UTC-6 (Central (CST))
  - Summer (DST): UTC-5 (CDT)
- Area code: 479
- GNIS feature ID: 2805641

Evansville is an unincorporated community and census-designated place (CDP) in southwest Washington County, Arkansas, United States. It was first listed as a CDP in the 2020 census with a population of 102.

It is located in the Northwest Arkansas region on Arkansas Highway 59 near the Oklahoma state line.

== History ==
A post office called Evansville has been in operation since 1838. The community was named after Captain Lewis Evans, a local merchant.

== Education ==
The community is served by the Lincoln Consolidated School District. Lincoln High School is its sole high school.

== Demographics ==
Historical population
Census	Pop.	Note	%±
2020	102		—
U.S. Decennial Census; 2020

=== 2020 census ===
Evansville CDP, Arkansas – Racial and ethnic composition Note: the US Census treats Hispanic/Latino as an ethnic category. This table excludes Latinos from the racial categories and assigns them to a separate category. Hispanics/Latinos may be of any race.
Race / Ethnicity (NH = Non-Hispanic)	Pop 2020	% 2020
White alone (NH)	82	80.39%
Black or African American alone (NH)	0	0.00%
Native American or Alaska Native alone (NH)	5	4.90%
Asian alone (NH)	1	0.98%
Pacific Islander alone (NH)	0	0.00%
Some Other Race alone (NH)	0	0.00%
Mixed Race or Multi-Racial (NH)	13	12.75%
Hispanic or Latino (any race)	1	0.98%
Total	102	100.00%

== Transportation ==
As of 2023, there is no fixed route transit service in Evansville. Ozark Regional Transit operates demand-response service in the area. The nearest intercity bus service is provided by Jefferson Lines in Van Buren.
