= Centerton, Arkansas =

- City
- Seal

- Location of Centerton in Benton County, Arkansas.
- Coordinates: 36°21′25″N 94°17′51″W
- Country: United States
- State: Arkansas
- County: Benton
- Established: September 16, 1914

Government
  - Mayor: Bill Edwards

Area
  - Total: 13.78 sq mi (35.69 km^{2})
  - Land: 13.64 sq mi (35.33 km^{2})
  - Water: 0.14 sq mi (0.35 km^{2})
- Elevation: 1,309 ft (399 m)

Population (2020)
  - Total: 17,792
  - Estimate (2025): 27,176 ▲
  - Density: 1,304.2/sq mi (503.56/km^{2})
- Time zone: UTC-6 (Central (CST))
  - Summer (DST): UTC-5 (CDT)
- ZIP code: 72719
- Area code: 479
- FIPS code: 05-12820
- GNIS feature ID: 2404021
- Website: www.centertonar.us

Centerton is a city in Benton County, Arkansas, United States. Located west of Bentonville on Highway 102, Centerton has grown from a railroad stop and fruit orchard community in the early 20th century into a suburban bedroom community within the rapidly growing Northwest Arkansas (NWA) region. The city's population has grown from 491 in 1990 to 27,176 in 2025. Centerton is considered to be one of the fastest growing cities in Arkansas and consistently ranks amongst the safest cities in the state.

== History ==
Native American hunters and early settlers were drawn to present-day Centerton by natural springs, including what is now known as McKissick Spring. In the Antebellum South era, an early church and school built along the spring were named Center Point, for the community's central location in Benton County. Though the area did not see any formal action during the Civil War, Union troops camped at McKissick Spring on March 5, 1862, shortly before the Battle of Pea Ridge.

After the Reconstruction era, the Arkansas-Oklahoma Railroad Company connected Rogers, Arkansas and Grove, Oklahoma through western Benton County. The railroad opened the apple and strawberry orchards of the county to new markets, bringing economic prosperity, development, and population growth to the region. Upon laying out the town in 1900, the name was changed to Centerton, as Center Point was already registered in Howard County.

== Geography ==
Centerton is located near the center of Benton County and Arkansas Highway 102 runs through the center of the city and leads east 5 miles (8 km) to Bentonville and west 11 miles (18 km) to Decatur.

The city has a total area of 11.9 square miles (30.8 km^{2}), of which 11.7 square miles (30.4 km^{2}) is land and 0.12 square miles (0.3 km^{2}), or 1.13%, is water.

=== Region ===
The Northwest Arkansas region consists of three Arkansas counties: Benton, Madison, and Washington. The area had a population of 347,045 at the 2000 census which had increased to 463,204 by the 2010 Census (an increase of 33.47 percent). The region does not consist of the usual principal-city-with-suburbs morphology; though today Centerton is largely a suburb of Bentonville. The Northwest Arkansas Regional Airport is located south of Centerton and is used to connect all of the Northwest Arkansas region to the rest of the nation. For more than the last decade, Northwest Arkansas has been one of the fastest-growing regions in the United States.

== Demographics ==
Historical population
Census	Pop.	Note	%±
1920	212		—
1930	206		−2.8%
1940	219		6.3%
1950	200		−8.7%
1960	177		−11.5%
1970	312		76.3%
1980	425		36.2%
1990	491		15.5%
2000	2,146		337.1%
2010	9,515		343.4%
2020	17,792		87.0%
2025 (est.)	27,176	▲	52.7%
U.S. Decennial Census

=== 2020 census ===
As of the 2020 census, Centerton had a population of 17,792. There were 5,929 households, including 3,776 families, in the city. The median age was 30.4 years. 32.6% of residents were under the age of 18 and 6.4% of residents were 65 years of age or older. For every 100 females there were 96.9 males, and for every 100 females age 18 and over there were 92.0 males age 18 and over.

Centerton racial composition
Race	Number	Percentage
White (non-Hispanic)	12,412	81.76%
Black or African American (non-Hispanic)	618	3.47%
Native American	199	1.12%
Asian	928	4.22%
Pacific Islander	32	0.18%
Other/Mixed	1,275	7.17%
Hispanic or Latino	2,328	11.78%

96.4% of residents lived in urban areas, while 3.6% lived in rural areas.

Of the 5,929 households, 51.6% had children under the age of 18 living in them. Of all households, 60.5% were married-couple households, 12.3% were households with a male householder and no spouse or partner present, and 19.8% were households with a female householder and no spouse or partner present. About 16.1% of all households were made up of individuals and 3.4% had someone living alone who was 65 years of age or older.

There were 6,280 housing units, of which 5.6% were vacant. The homeowner vacancy rate was 2.5% and the rental vacancy rate was 7.2%.

=== 2010 census ===
As of the 2010 census Centerton had a population of 9,515. The racial and ethnic composition of the population was 78.7% non-Hispanic white, 3.5% non-Hispanic black, 1.2% Native American, 2.3% Asian, 0.1% Pacific Islander, 2.6% from two or more races and 12.2% Hispanic or Latino.

=== 2000 census ===
As of the census of 2000, there were 2,146 people, 730 households, and 602 families residing in the city. The population density was 533.8 inhabitants per square mile (206.1/km^{2}). There were 796 housing units at an average density of 198.0 per square mile (76.4/km^{2}). The racial makeup of the city was 96.37% White, 0.14% Black or African American, 0.93% Native American, 0.19% Asian, 0.70% from other races, and 1.68% from two or more races. 4.05% of the population were Hispanic or Latino of any race.

There were 730 households, out of which 50.5% had children under the age of 18 living with them, 69.3% were married couples living together, 10.3% had a female householder with no husband present, and 17.4% were non-families. 13.3% of all households were made up of individuals, and 3.7% had someone living alone who was 65 years of age or older. The average household size was 2.94 and the average family size was 3.23.

In the city, the population was spread out, with 34.6% under the age of 18, 7.5% from 18 to 24, 38.5% from 25 to 44, 13.1% from 45 to 64, and 6.3% who were 65 years of age or older. The median age was 29 years. For every 100 females, there were 94.6 males. For every 100 females age 18 and over, there were 91.8 males.

The median income for a household in the city was $46,600, and the median income for a family was $50,000. Males had a median income of $31,216 versus $22,731 for females. The per capita income for the city was $17,530. About 6.2% of families and 7.7% of the population were below the poverty line, including 10.1% of those under age 18 and 5.8% of those age 65 or over.

== Economy ==
=== Region ===
The Northwest Arkansas economy was historically based upon agriculture and poultry. In recent decades, NWA has seen rapid growth and diversification of its economy based upon the big companies based there, Walmart, Tyson Foods, and J.B. Hunt, while also seeing a growing University of Arkansas and cultural amenities sector. Although impacted by the Great Recession, NWA's economy fared better than most peer metropolitan areas, the state of Arkansas and the United States overall. Between 2007 and 2013, the region saw unemployment rates significantly below those of peer regions and the national average. The region also saw a 1% net growth of jobs. The NWA gross domestic product grew 7.0% over the aforementioned time period, and bankruptcies, building permits and per capita incomes are returning to pre-Recession rates.

The professional, education and health care sectors of the Northwest Arkansas economy have been growing steadily since 2007. Between 2007 and 2013, the region has seen a growth of 8,300 jobs in the region, with 6,100 added in education and health professions and 4,300 jobs added in the leisure and hospitality jobs related to the region's cultural amenities. The government and transportation sectors have remained relatively constant between 2007 and 2013, however the manufacturing sector has seen steady decline, mirroring national averages. The construction and real estate sectors saw large declines attributable to the poor housing market during the economic downturn.

== Education ==
Public education for elementary and secondary students in the majority of Centerton is provided by Bentonville School District. A very small portion to the west is in the boundary for the Decatur School District. Centerton is home to three of the district's schools.

Centerton Gamble Elementary School in Centerton serves kindergarten through grade 4 and includes much of Centerton. Other portions of Centerton are zoned to Elm Tree, Mary Mae Jones, Osage Creek, and Vaughn elementary schools. Centerton is divided between Ardis Ann Middle School, Creekside Middle School, and Ruth Barker Middle School. Much of Centerton is zoned to Grimsley Junior High School in Centerton, while some sections are zoned to Lincoln Junior High School. All portions of Centerton in the Bentonville district are zoned to Bentonville West High School in Centerton.

Decatur High School is the comprehensive high school of the Decatur district.

Centerton is also home to one of Northwest Arkansas's private schools. Lifeway Christian School serves preschool through grade 12 and is based in the city's First Baptist Church Centerton.
