= Hiwasse, Arkansas =

- Neighborhood in Gravette, Arkansas; Former census-designated place
- Location within Arkansas
- Coordinates: 36°25′54″N 94°20′02″W
- Country: United States
- State: Arkansas
- County: Benton

Area
  - Total: 4.943 sq mi (12.80 km^{2})
  - Land: 4.942 sq mi (12.80 km^{2})
  - Water: 0.001 sq mi (0.0026 km^{2})
- Elevation: 1,332 ft (406 m)

Population (2010)
  - Total: 497
  - Density: 101/sq mi (38.8/km^{2})
- Time zone: UTC-6 (Central (CST))
  - Summer (DST): UTC-5 (CDT)
- ZIP code: 72739
- Area code: 479
- GNIS feature ID: 77191

Hiwasse was an unincorporated community and census-designated place in Benton County, Arkansas, United States. As of the 2010 census, its population was 497. It is the location of (or is the nearest community to) Hiwasse Bank Building, which is located at Main St., AR 279 and Banks House, which is located on AR 72 west of Hiwasse. Both are listed on the National Register of Historic Places.

Hiwasse faced a great division in 2007–2008, when two groups faced off over the incorporation of Hiwasse. In the end, the voters decided not to incorporate, with adjacent Gravette annexing the community in 2012.

== Education ==
Public education for elementary and secondary students is provided by Gravette School District, which leads to graduation from Gravette High School.
