= 8th Arkansas Field Battery =

8th Arkansas Field Battery (Confederate)
- Active: 1862–1865
- Disbanded: May 26, 1865
- Country: Confederate States of America
- Allegiance: CSA
- Branch: Artillery
- Nickname: Hughey's Battery
- Engagements: American Civil War: Battle of Fayetteville; Battle of Devil's Backbone; Camden Expedition; Battle of Prairie D'Ane; Battle of Poison Spring; Battle of Marks' Mills; Battle at Ditch Bayou; Price's Missouri Raid; Battle of Fort Davidson; Fourth Battle of Boonville; Second Battle of Lexington; Battle of Little Blue River; Second Battle of Independence; Battle of Byram's Ford; Battle of Westport; Battle of Marais des Cygnes; Battle of Mine Creek; Battle of Marmiton River; Second Battle of Newtonia

Commanders
- 1862-1865: Captain William M. Hughey

The 8th Arkansas Field Battery (1862–1865) was a Confederate Army artillery battery during the American Civil War. The battery spent its entire existence in the Department of the Trans-Mississippi. It was also known as Hughey's Battery.

== Organization ==
William M. Hughey lived in Ouachita Parish, Louisiana, when the war began. He enrolled in a local mounted volunteer company very early in the war, but the company disbanded. Next Hughey joined the "McCown Guards Artillery", commanded by Capt. D. Whitaker Harris, a company organized in Lafayette County, Arkansas, and eventually designated as Company B, 1st Tennessee Heavy Artillery. Sometime in 1862, Hughey returned to Arkansas. Hughey may have accompanied General Hindman when he came to the state in May or he may have accompanied General M.M. Parson's Missouri Infantry Brigade and the artillery train that Parson brought with him in his crossing of the Mississippi. According to a Goodspeed biographical sketch, "An artillery company was raised and placed under his command, and he served under General Hindman in this capacity in the several engagements that took place in Arkansas following that date."

When General Thomas C. Hindman arrived in Arkansas in late May 1862 to assume command of the new Trans-Mississippi District, he found almost nothing to command. He quickly began organizing new regiments, but his most pressing need was for arms for the new forces he was organizing, including the artillery. With Hindman's first order, dated May 31, 1862, at Little Rock, he announced his staff, including the appointment of Major Francis A. Shoup, Chief of Artillery. On September 29, 1862, General Hindman issued Special Order No. 8 from Little Rock which directed F. A. Shoup, now a Colonel, to take charge of the organization of the artillery from North West Arkansas and assigning certain "suitable officers to duty in the company now unorganized, and recommend them for appointment." These suitable officers included Lieutenants Huey(sic) and Miller. By November 8, 1862, Lieutenants Hughey and Miller were helping Captain James Shoup organize a battery. Special Order No. 35, from Camp on the Mulberry River, assigned the following officers to duty in "Shoup's Mountain Battery":

J. C. Shoup Captain.
W. M. Huey(sic) 1st Lieut.
W. A. Miller Jr. 1st Lieut.
G. F. Halliburton 2nd Lieut.

Shoup's Mountain Battery was involved in the Battle of Cane Hill, November 28, 1862, and the Battle of Prairie Grove on December 7, 1862. Col. Charles A. Carroll took note of Hughey's performance in his report of the engagement at Cane Hill:

Of the mountain howitzer battery attached to my brigade, and commanded by First Lieutenant Hughey, only one section was serviceable... In moving the battery from the first position taken in the morning, the carriage of one of the pieces was so badly broken as to render impossible to moving of it by horses. Notwithstanding the gun thus dismantled was under a galling fire of the enemy's artillery, shells bursting by the minute around it, the cannoneers dismounted, and, under the direction of their officers, bore the piece, crippled but triumphant, to the rear....

Chas. A. Carroll,

Colonel, Commanding Brigade

In the re-organization of the Army of the Trans-Mississippi following the defeat at Prairie Grove, a decision was made by General Hindman to disband Shoup's battery due to the poor quality of its guns. The battery personnel, which had been made up of men detailed from various infantry units were disbanded, the men sent back to their original commands and the officers, including Lieutenants Hughey and Miller were relieved of duty.

By March 1863, First Lieutenant William M. Hughey and Second Lieutenant W. A. Miller, formerly of Shoup's Mountain Battery were organizing a new battery with men taken from the Camp of Instruction at Dardanelle, Arkansas. On April 2, 1863, General Cabell wrote from Clarksville Arkansas to General Cooper:

...requesting that Lt Hughey late of Capt Harris' btry be appointed Capt of Artillery and ordered to report to me for duty. He was elected 1st Lt in Dec, 1861...He came west of the river with Gen Hindman... He is now in command of a 3 gun battery in my command and I find him competent, faithful and industrious...

== Service ==
=== Action at Fayetteville, Arkansas ===
The newly formed battery accompanied Brigadier General William L. Cabell on his Fayetteville raid in April 1863. Confederate Brigadier General Cabell departed Ozark, Arkansas, with 900 cavalry and Hughey's Battery with the intent of dislodging the Union from Fayetteville, Arkansas. Approaching the city from the south, the Confederates captured nine Union soldiers near West Fork, Arkansas, at night on April 17. The following morning the Confederates climbed East Mountain and Hughey's Battery fired south into the city. Cabell's cavalry rushed the city streets around 6:00 am intending to attack the Tebbetts House which held the Union command. The attackers halted and waited for cannon fire from the Hughey's Battery stationed on the mountain to damage the headquarters. Confederates pressed their attack into Fayetteville, capturing Union soldiers and destroying a supply train before the Union rallied and repelled the Southern troops. Union soldiers began approaching the Hughey's Battery upon East Mountain under cover. By this time the battery was under attack and out of ammunition forcing its withdrawal. General Cabell described the battery's effect:

The artillery managed by Captain Hughey, under my immediate command, did frightful execution in the enemies camp, driving them out and completely scattering their cavalry for a while. Captain Hughey was wounded in the army by a sharpshooter at the commencement of the action, but continued in charge of his pieces, under heavy fire from the enemy sharpshooter during the whole fight.

During the Action a Fayetteville, the battery suffered two horses killed, two horses wounded, one man killed and several wounded. William Hughey was himself wounded in the arm in the battle of Fayetteville. The battery retreated with General Cabell's forces back to Fort Smith. Cabell occupied Fort Smith through the summer of 1863.

The battery was reorganized on June 8, 1863, and reinforced with a couple of dozen details from Monroe's Cavalry Regiment. By July 30, 1862, Hughey was signing for forage at Fort Smith as captain, commanding battery. In the Compiled Service Records of the 26th Arkansas Infantry Regiment there are a handful of entries indicating that some infantrymen had been assigned to Hughey's Battery on September 1, 1863, the day of the Battle of Devil's Backbone. It is unclear if the assignment preceded the battle, took place during the battle, or occurred to facilitate the retreat of Cabell's force after the battle. General Cabel's report on the Battle of Devil's Backbone mentions "the gallantry of Captain [W.M.] Hughey, commanding the battery...." It appears that Monroe's regiment, Hughey's Battery and a company of Morgan's regiment performed quite well in the engagement:

General Blunt, finding out that I had abandoned the position I had on the Poteau, sent Colonel Cloud, with 1,500 cavalry, six pieces of artillery, and 40 wagons, loaded with infantry, in pursuit of me. They followed, and attacked the picket I left at Jenny Lind about 9 o'clock on the 1st day of September. The picket skirmished with their advance until they reached the foot of Backbone Mountain, about 16 miles (26 km) from Fort Smith, where I had formed my command for battle. I placed Monroe's regiment in ambush at the foot of the mountain, and placed all the different regiments en echelon along the sides of the mountain, near the road; the battery being placed so as to command the whole field of operations. The enemy came dashing up, yelling and shouting, confident of success, their cavalry in advance. When they came within gunshot, Monroe's regiment opened fire on them, and dismounted every man except two in the front companies. The action soon became general, and, after a heavy fire of nearly three hours and a half, especially of artillery, the enemy were repulsed, with a loss of about 30 killed and from 100 to 150 wounded. My loss was 5 killed and 12 wounded. The number of missing I cannot state, as eight companies of Morgan's infantry regiment, Hill's and Thomson's regiments, and Woosley's battalion of cavalry ran in the most shameful manner. Hill's regiment, in running, ran through the provost guard, where I had 80 prisoners under sentence for treason and desertion. These men in running carried all the prisoners off with them. Thomson's and Hill's regiments acted in the most disgraceful manner. The eight companies of Morgan's regiment acted but little better. There was nothing to make these regiments run, except the sound of the cannon. Had they fought as troops fighting for liberty should, I would have captured the whole of the enemy's command, and gone back to Fort Smith, and driven the remainder of the enemy's force off, and retaken the place. As it was, I was forced, on account of the smallness of my force, to content myself with repulsing the enemy and protecting the public property. Leaving a party to bury the dead and take off the wounded, I, after posting a heavy picket on the battle-field, withdrew in good order, and marched to Waldron, Scott County, arriving there on the 2nd of September. I must mention the gallantry of Captain Hughey, commanding the battery, and his two lieutenants, Miller and Henley, as well as all his men. Captain Hughey and Lieutenant Miller particularly distinguished themselves with their old iron battery.....

=== Red River Campaign, Camden Expedition ===
Hughey's Battery, attached to Colonel William A. Crawford's Brigade, of Major General James Fleming Fagan's Division was engaged in the Camden Expedition in the spring of 1864, including the actions at Battle of Prairie D'Ane, Battle of Poison Spring, and the Battle of Marks' Mills.

According to Colton Greene's reports for May and June 1864, Hughey's Battery was attached to Marmaduke's Brigade, Colton Greene commanding. This time period would include the Battle at Ditch Bayou, a.k.a. Battle of Lake Chicot, on June 6, 1864. It seems that Colonel Greene thought highly of this unit.

=== Prices' Missouri Raid ===
The battery took part in Price's Raid in Missouri during the fall of 1864, assigned to Brigadier General William L. Cabell's brigade of Major General Fagan's Division. The battery is mentioned in Union Army Reports of the Battle of Fort Davidson, also known as the Battle of Pilot Knob, on September 27, 1864:

Fagan's division had four brigades, under Generals Cabell and McCray and Colonels Dobbin and Slemons. Cabell's brigade had the following regiments: Morgan's, 500; Monroe's, 500; Hill's, 500; Gordon's, 500; Gunter's battalion, 200; HarrelFs battalion, 200; Witherspoous battalion, 200; Hughey's Battery, five 6-pounders and one 12pounder howitzer. In MeCray's brigade were the following regiments: Coleman's, Crandall's, Reves', Baber's, and Anderson's battalion; no battery. In Slemons' were the following regiments: Crawford's, Wright's, and Second Arkansas, and Gentry's battery, two guns. In Dobbin's brigade were McGhee's battalion and Zimmerman's battery, two guns, one 6 and one 12-pounder..... It was Cabell's brigade, Fagan's division, and Clark's brigade, of Marmaduke's division, with Hughey's and Pratt's batteries, that did most of the lighting here.

The battery apparently lost tow guns and a number of horses during the Second Battle of Independence Missouri on October 21, 1864.

During the remainder of Prices raid, the battery was present or engaged in the following battles:

Price's Missouri Raid, Arkansas-Missouri-Kansas, September–October, 1864

Battle of Fort Davidson, Missouri, September 27, 1864
Fourth Battle of Boonville, Missouri, October 11, 1864
Second Battle of Lexington, Missouri, October 19, 1864
Battle of Little Blue River, Missouri, October 21, 1864
Second Battle of Independence, Missouri, October 21–22, 1864
Battle of Byram's Ford, Missouri, October 22–23, 1864
Battle of Westport, Missouri, October 23, 1864
Battle of Marais des Cygnes, Linn County, Kansas, October 25, 1864
Battle of Mine Creek, Missouri, October 25, 1864
Battle of Marmiton River, Missouri, October 25, 1864
Second Battle of Newtonia, Missouri, October 28, 1864

=== Final year of the war ===
On November 19, 1864, General E. Kirby Smith, commanding the Confederate Trans-Mississippi Department, issued Special Orders No. 290, organizing the artillery of the department into battalions. The component batteries rarely, if ever, operated together. They were usually assigned individually to an infantry or cavalry brigade to provide fire support. In this reorganization, Hughey's Battery, armed with 4 guns, and commanded by Capt. John G. Marshall was re-designated as the 8th Arkansas Field Battery and assigned to the 2nd Artillery Battalion, commanded by Major J. H. Pratt.

== Surrender ==
The battery surrendered with General Kirby Smith on May 26, 1865. The date of the military convention between Confederate General Edmund Kirby Smith and Union General Edward Canby for the surrender of the troops and public property in the Trans-Mississippi Department was May 26, 1865, however, it took a while for parole commissioners to be appointed and for public property to be accounted for. As a result, a final report of field artillery which was part of the accounting process was not completed until June 1, 1865. According to the final accounting, at the time of the surrender, the battery was armed with two 3-inch rifles; and two 12-pounder field howitzers. The final report list the four guns as being near Camden, Arkansas.

== See also ==
- List of Confederate units from Arkansas
- Confederate Units by State
