= 1st Arkansas Infantry Regiment (Union) =

1st Regiment Arkansas Volunteer Infantry
- Artist Interpretation of 1st Arkansas National Flag
- Active: March 25, 1863 – August 10, 1865
- Disbanded: August 10, 1865
- Country: United States
- Allegiance: Union
- Branch: United States Army Volunteers
- Type: Infantry
- Role: Garrison, Escort
- Size: Regiment
- Garrison/HQ: Fort Smith
- Nickname: "Mountain feds"
- Engagements: American Civil War: Battle of Fayetteville; Skirmish at Fayetteville; Capture of Fort Smith; Battle of Haguewood Prairie; Occupation of Waldron; Skirmish at Mount Ida; Camden Expedition; Battle of Prairie D'Ane (?); Battle of Moscow; Battle of Jenkins Ferry; Skirmish at Bates Township; Skirmish at Newton County

Commanders
- Col.: James M. Johnson
- Lt. Col.: Elhanan J. Searle
- Maj.: Elijah D. Ham
- Maj.: Francis "Frank" M. Johnson

The 1st Regiment Arkansas Volunteer Infantry (1863–1865) was an infantry regiment that served in the Union Army during the American Civil War. Although Arkansas joined the Confederate States of America in 1861, not all of its citizens supported secession. Arkansas formed some 48 infantry regiments to serve in the Confederate Army, but also formed another 11 regiments that served in the Union Army.

== Background ==
During the antebellum period, Arkansas geopolitics could be split into two regions. The eastern counties along the Mississippi River, with their large slave plantations situated on flat fertile land, and the northwest, with its rolling hills taken up by yeomen and small towns. Unlike their fellow Arkansans on the opposite side of the state, cotton was not king in the northwest. This region was also located next to the Indian Territory, where no doubt citizens took comfort in the fact of having Fort Smith, a Federal Army Fort, of which to offer them protection. With these conditions, it is easy to see why the Northwest was the most Pro-Union area in the state. The men of this region were also one of the first to offer themselves as soldiers for the Federal government during the Mexican-American War. In April 1861, in response to a confederate flag raising at Fayetteville, unionists raised the Stars and Stripes above the courthouse. However, this region had by no means had a unionists majority. Following Arkansas seceding from the Union, men rushed to enlist in the confederate army from all across Arkansas, with multiple regiments being organized in the Northwest. Despite this Arkansas unionists still held firm, albeit in secrecy, such as the organization of the Arkansas Peace Society. Those who spoke out against secession found themselves being increasingly harassed by confederate sympathizers. Some decided to move into the mountains for seclusion and protection while others fled the state entirely.

Northwest Arkansas saw extensive action early in the Civil War following the Battle of Wilson's Creek. In February 1862 a federal army, under the command of General Curtis, entered Arkansas south of Springfield, Missouri. Some men, after seeing this large Yankee army invade their state, were compelled to enlist in confederate regiments as a way of protecting their homes. For those who had been harassed it was a sight of relief. The latter of which would have their hopes dashed no soon as they began.

After the Battle of Pea Ridge, on March 7, 1862, General Curtis began to move his army east with the intent of capturing Memphis, Tennessee but after being ordered to send half his army to Missouri and being defeated near Searcy, Curtis then decided to occupy the city of Helena. Along the way his army was joined by a few of the local unionists mentioned earlier. These men wanted to fight the same men who had harassed them and their families and became dismayed after learning that the army's destination would take them east to the Mississippi River. Nonetheless these men carried on and were eventually mustered in a battalion of infantry in the summer of 1862. Their enlistments only lasted 6 months and in that time they saw no fighting and were later mustered out in Missouri. Another Arkansas Regiment was also formed in the same summer, that being the 1st Arkansas Union Cavalry. Unlike the 1st Arkansas Infantry battalion, the 1st Arkansas Cavalry saw much fighting in Northwest Arkansas, mainly skirmishing with confederate guerrillas. In the fall of 1862, unionists would be given good news as another large Union army was once again entering Northwest Arkansas.

== Organization ==
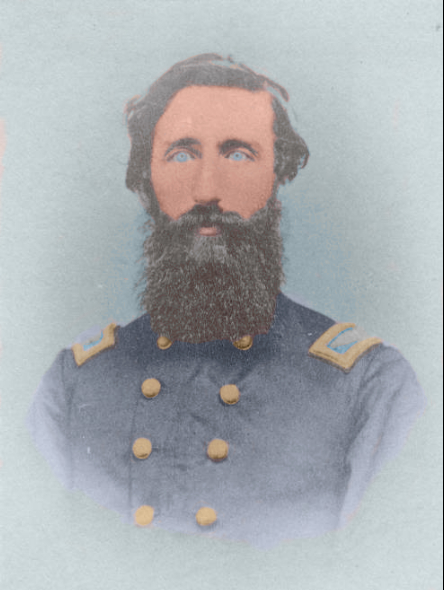
Colonel Johnson, leader of the 1st Arkansas went on to become a Brevet Brigadier General.

In April 1862 James M. Johnson, a doctor and unionist from Huntsville, left the state with his brother, Frank, and his friend Issac Murphy. Like many other unionists, they left due to the increasing amount of harassment at the hands of confederate guerillas. All three men were prominent unionists, the most famous of which being Murphy who was the only delegate to vote against secession during the final call the previous year. The group headed north until they reached Keitsville, Missouri, where they made contact with General Samual R. Curtis, who commanded the Army of the Southwest. Johnson and his brother offered their services to the Union army, with Johnson becoming an Aide to General Curtis. Johnson followed the army to Helena and throughout the summer and fall would serve as an aide to various other Generals in Arkansas, eventually traveling back to the northwest with the Army of the Frontier in October 1862. As the Army moved south they reached Elkhorn Tavern and here Johnson received the authority to raise a loyal Arkansas Infantry Regiment. It wouldn't be until the aftermath of the Prairie Grove Campaign and the following exodus of the northwestern confederate army that recruiting could finally begin. In December Johnson set up a headquarters at Fayetteville and in January he was aided by an Illinois captain named Elhanan J. Searle, and the two would gradually recruit men from the surrounding counties.

=== James M. Johnson ===
James Madison Johnson his was born in 1832 in Tennessee but moved to Arkansas in 1836, settling in Madison County. In 1850 Johnson married Elizabeth Johnson and the two would have seven children. Johnson attended the Ozark institute and Arkansas College where he likely became acquainted with Issac Murphy who taught at Ozark. Following a brief teaching stint of his own, Johnson left Arkansas to attend the St. Louis Medical School in 1857, returning two years later where he opened up his own medical clinic in Huntsville which he maintained until 1862.

Johnson was against slavery and in the 1850s bought an enslaved mother and child and had them officially freed thanks to his friend Judge Elijah D. Ham, who would be appointed as Major of the 1st Arkansas. Johnson and his family were prominent unionists when the Civil War broke out and due to this their safety in the region became so uncertain that the decision was made to leave, with Johnson making plans for his family to relocate to Illinois while he joined the army.

=== Elhanan J. Searle ===
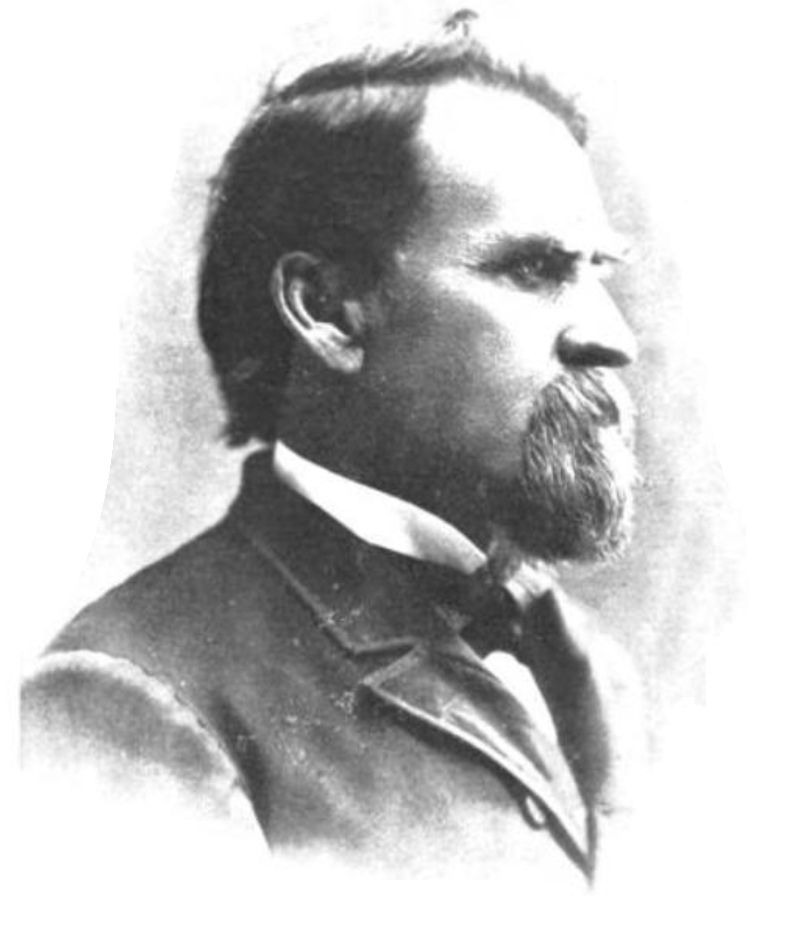
By the end of the war Searle had served as the de facto colonel of the First Arkansas, with reverend Springer, as early as the summer of 1863, stating that "Lt. Col. Searle, of course, is its [1st Arkansas] Commander". Johnson was often busy with commanding various military post or away on matters relating to the state government.

Elhanan John Searle was born in 1835 and grew up in Illinois where he was educated at River Seminary the Northwestern University where he obtained a bachelor's and master's degree. While at college Searle began studying law and in 1859, following his graduation, moved to Springfield to work under the law office of Abraham Lincoln and his partner William Herndon. By the time Searle passed the bar the civil war began and Lincoln, now president, offered Searle an army commission but he turned it down and instead enlisted as a private in the 10th Illinois Cavalry, eventually rising to the rank of captain. The 10th cavalry saw action at Cane Hill and Prairie Grove before being sent to Huntsville in January 1863, where Searle began to aid In the organization of the 1st Arkansas.

=== Recruiting ===
On January 31, 1863, Johnson and Searle hosted a large gathering at Huntsville for recruiting, and according to Reverend Francis Springer, who later become the regiment's chaplain, "a considerable number of enlistments entered the roll of the new regiment". In March the regiment received a large number of recruits due to the arrivals of Captains Brown, Vanderpool, and a guerilla fighter named William "Wild Bill" Heffington. Captain Vanderpool of Company C brought 200 men from Newton County on March 8 and Captain brown brought 83 unionists from Arkadelphia, who the previous month had beaten off a force of 300 confederates, arriving at Fayetteville on March 9. Heffington arrived from Yell county with another large group of men which later became Company I, with Heffington as Captain.

Many of the new volunteers had previously served in the Confederate army, some willingly and others conscripted, who had since deserted, Captain Heffington for example had previously served as a Lieutenant in the 17th Arkansas Infantry. Some of these deserters, as well as unionists, formed armed units to repulse confederates in the region. These units would often seek refuge in the woods and hilly terrain of the Northwest, thus receiving the name "Mountain Feds" by both sides.

=== Mustering ===
On March 25, 1863, the regiment was officially mustered into service, numbering 36 officers and 810 enlisted, the majority of these being from Washington, Newton, Benton, Searcy, and Crawford counties. Johnson was commissioned as the regiment's colonel and Searle was mustered in as Lieutenant Colonel. At the time of their mustering, however, the 1st Arkansas could scarcely be called a regiment. An April 1 report by Colonel Marcus Harrison, commanding officer at Fayetteville, describes the 1st Arkansas Infantry as being "totally without transportation, clothing or tents, or equipments" and the only weapons they could procure came from the guns left on the battlefield of Prairie Grove, of which were "of all patterns and calibers". Harrison was also concerned that if Fayetteville was attacked, union forces would not be able to distinguish between them and "rebels in the same dress." These were the conditions in which the regiment would enter their first battle.

== Service ==
=== Battle of Fayetteville ===
The town of Fayetteville was becoming increasingly vulnerable throughout the spring of 1863, with confederate forces slowly making their way back into the northwest. By April Fayetteville was only garrisoned by two regiments, the 1st Arkansas Cavalry and 1st Arkansas Infantry, and there were doubts about how effective the Arkansans would be. The 1st Infantry was still awaiting proper guns and clothing from Missouri but these never arrived in time for the battle. Equipment aside much of the regiment would be unavailable for action as many were sick and portions of Companies C and F, numbering over 100 men, were sent on a scouting mission to Newton County on April 15. Captain Heffington and Colonel Johnson were not present as well, with the former leaving to induct more recruits and the latter being at St. Louis for a military tribunal. By the start of the Battle, less than 500 of the 810 enlisted would be available for action.

On the morning of April 18, 1863, a Confederate force under General William Cabell attacked Fayetteville and colonel Harrison quickly organized his Arkansas regiments for battle. Given Colonel Johnson's absence, command of the regiment fell to Lieutenant Colonel Searle and Major Elijah D. Ham. Harrison ordered Searle to move seven companies of the regiment into a reserve position due to their lack of army clothing, though he later informed Searle to be ready to move them into position should the need arise. Companies A, F, and H were ordered to form along Harrison's centerline, along with 4 companies of cavalry. During the battle, Harrison later ordered two companies in reserve to form along the federal left flank facing east. Despite the roaring guns of artillery the companies in reserve held firm and stayed in position. Near the end of the battle Harrison's centerline, of which the three infantry companies made up the right half, faced heavy fighting as the confederates attempted to capture the federal headquarters building. After repulsing multiple charges the confederates withdrew and the battle war over.

The regiment's success did not come without a cost however as Captains Parker and Smith, of Companies H and A respectively, were both slightly wounded along with 6 others and one wounded severely. Private Cockrell would die during the battle and Private Shockley would later succumb to his wounds. A few from the regiment fled during the battle, most notably the Regimental Quartermaster Crittenden Wells who later returned and was dismissed in July. In his after-action report, Colonel Harrison praised Lt. Col. Searle and Major Ham, saying that the two "did good service in keeping their men in position and preventing them from being terrified by the artillery".

Fearing that Fayetteville would again come under attack and faced with dwindling supplies, Harrison decided to withdraw his force into Missouri. On April 25 the two loyal Arkansans regiments departed Fayetteville along with a train of over 1,000 unionist families, many of which likely belonged to the 1st infantry and cavalry.

=== Service on the Frontier 1863-1864 ===
After a March of over 100 miles, the regiment arrived at Springfield on May 4, marching into the city in their "ragged and tattered 'Butternuts'" according to one account. Here Col. Johnson returned to the regiment and for the next two months, the regiment would remain in Springfield at where they likely waited to receive proper equipment. Company E reported that its men were sent to guard forage trains and conduct patrols, all the while lacking any shoes, coats or blankets to protect them against the elements. On July 6 the regiment was ordered to Cassville, Missouri, less than 20 miles from the Arkansas border. Rebel activity was strong around Cassville with scouts being attacked by small bands of confederates, though the city itself was never directly attacked. Col. Johnson was appointed the commander of the post and was active in this command, personally meeting with confederates under a flag of truce and sending out scouts across the region. The former involved a confederate captain requesting that Johnson remove the armed unionists from Arkansas, a request that was promptly denied by the colonel. On July 30 the Colonel received the same types of unionists the confederate captain referred to when Elijah Drake, the sheriff of Madison County, and 32 of his neighbors arrived at Cassville with weapons and enlisted into the union regiments at the post, including the 1st Arkansas Infantry. Drake and his fellow unionists had been hiding out in the hills due to the violence and theft which had become commonplace in the region.

Also in July, a scouting mission to Fayetteville was launched from Cassville, which included a few soldiers from the 1st Arkansas infantry who were mounted for this expedition. The scout reached Fayetteville but the rebels had retreated just before they arrived. The scouts were attacked on their return trip by concealed confederates, who wounded 2 men. Responding in kind, the scouts took 9 prisoners and reportedly killed 17 of their attackers.

While Col. Johnson operated the post Lt. Col. Searle and Major Ham oversaw the daily regimental drill. Reverend Springer wrote the following in regards to the regiment's training:

Only a few months ago the members of the 1st Ark. Infantry were raw recruits & quite as unsoldierly in appearance as the most ludicrous person could desire for a caricature of Motley Militia on training day in time of peace. But they are now in admirable trim,--expert in the use of the musket, prompt, vigorous & precise in maneuver; & always ready for duty.

==== Capture of Fort Smith ====
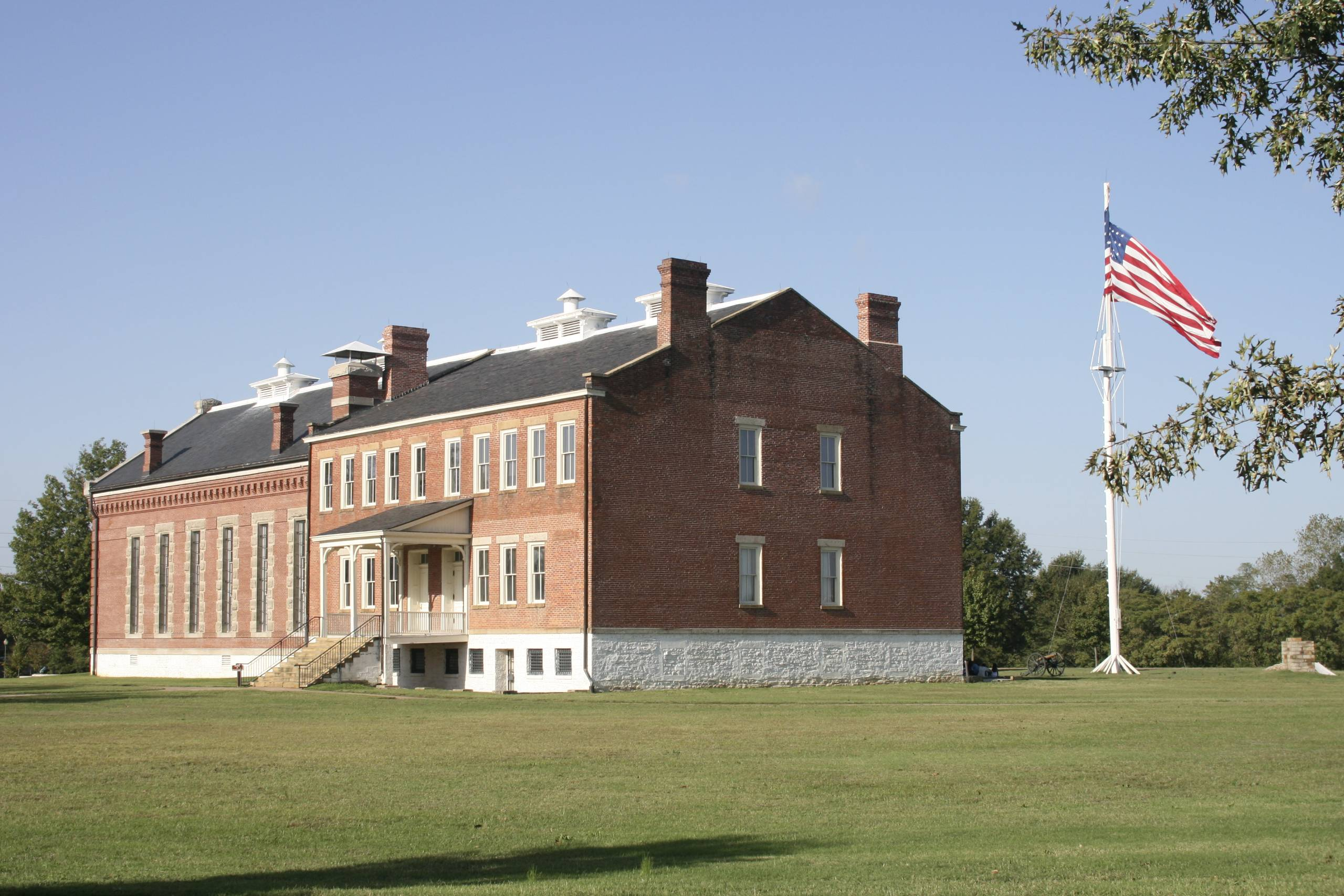
Following the occupation of Fort Smith many unionists fled to the Fort for protection and to enlist, with many of the latter serving in the 1st Arkansas as the Fort was the main garrison of the regiment for the remainder of the war. Shown here is the Barracks of Fort Smith, designed to quarter soldiers the amount of units stationed at the Fort meant the majority camped in tents on the parade ground.

In August the regiment was ordered to report to Major General James Blunt, commanding the Army of the Frontier, at Fort Gibson in the Choctaw Nation (Indian Territory) to take part in an offensive against the confederates in the region. On August 13 the regiment departed Cassville heading south and crossed the Arkansas border, from there heading west. During the march, Colonel Johnson decided to take a different route than a previous federal division to be in a better position if any confederate forces attacked but none came and the regiment marched into Indian Territory unmolested. On August 23 the 1st Arkansas reached Fort Gibson and the following day began marching south, behind General Blunt's main force. It was on that day, the 24th, that Col. Johnson was nearly the victim of friendly fire. Johnson decided to scout the route ahead of the regiment alone and after traveling 3 miles he spotted four men. Believing them to be rebels given their attire he approached the group and the two questioned each other, to which the answers Johnson gave didn't satisfy the men. The standoff gradually ended after Johnson, who was wearing a coat that hid his rank, asked if they belonged to General Blunt's army and the four replied they did. From there the two learned of each other's identity; the four men were union scouts who were hoping to rejoin the army. One of the men told Johnson that they "felt a strong inclination at the sight of him to fire upon him", with the man further elaborating to the Colonel that "our Army of the Frontier has its scouts & spies dressed in citizens' dress, in Federal uniform, in rebel uniform, in butternut & in buckskin; & we have a right to suppose that the secesh are as uncertain in their dress as we are".

The regiment arrived at General Blunt's headquarters on the 25th where they rested and ate the little amount of food they could. Continuing on the march they eventually reached a road that led in the direction of Fort Smith. On the 29th the regiment was approached by a man who believed them to be members of the confederate army. Major Ham told him they were confederate reinforcements and brought the man to Colonel Johnson. Here he explained how many union soldiers he had killed, including one that very day. Upon learning this Ham and Johnson dropped the act and the confederate bushwhacker was killed. A cabin was later found that was believed to have been used to house similar bushwhackers and it was considered if it should be burned. Johnson refused as the cabin was the home of Native American women and children. On August 31 the regiment reached Scullyville and the following day, on 1 September, General Blunt sent Colonel William Cloud's brigade to follow the retreating confederates, which cumulated in the Battle of Devil's Backbone, while he, his bodyguard, and the 1st Arkansas captured Fort Smith. The regiment entered the garrison without opposition and for the first time since 1861, the American Flag was raised over the Fort. The journey that ended in Fort Smith's capture was brutal for the regiment with an officer stating that the regiment "marched 400 miles on scanty rations and poor water".

==== Return to Arkansas ====
Following the capture of Fort Smith, the 1st Arkansas was reunited with the detachments from companies C and F, which had previously been sent on a scouting mission in the weeks following the regiment's mustering. Due to Portions of Companies C and F being sent off on detached service prior to the evacuation of Fayetteville they were left stranded in Arkansas with little support. The Company F scout had been attacked by a force of 300-400 confederates, sending the men into a panic as they "fled to the bushes for safety". Throughout the summer the two detachments would continue to evade and skirmish with confederate guerrillas in Newton, Carroll, and Pope counties. Their main goal was disrupting confederate conscription in the region, with Jasper serving as their headquarters briefly. On August 22 Captain Vanderpool, who led the Company C detachment, reunited with Company F at Fayetteville. Also at Fayetteville were the 2nd Arkansas and Kansas Cavalry's, with a small detachment of the 1st Arkansas Infantry from Cassville. Shortly after their arrival, however, the town was once again attacked and many from the Company F detachment fled in disarray and were later marked as deserters. The skirmish ended shortly thereafter and both sides departed. By September 3 Captain Vanderpool had led both detachments to Fort Smith where they rejoined the regiment after more than 4 months of evading enemy capture.

One man who did not return however was Captain Heffington. Throughout the spring and summer, Heffington was active in attempting to induct various mountain feds into the Union army. The removal of Union forces in Arkansas, which occurred following his departure from the regiment, made this task more difficult, though his mountain feds were able to successfully fend off multiple confederate attacks. In August, Heffington was killed while attempting to reach Cassville to organize a force to relieve the unionists, though much of the circumstances of his death are a mystery.

In September, news of a large body of unionists near Mount Magazine reached the Union army. In response detachments of Companies H and I were sent to deliver ammunition and other supplies to the mountain feds. Led by Captain Parker, with about 50-60 soldiers, they marched east towards Dardanelle and successfully completed their mission without any major difficulties. On his return, Parker decided to make camp at Haguewood Prairie, an area that would allow his men to visit their families in the area. On September 27 the companies were encountered by elements of confederate cavalry known as "Shelby's Iron Brigade", led by Captain Thorpe, who was heading north to raid Missouri. Not only was the encounter a surprise to both sides, but some of the 1st Arkansas also had their families present when the attack began. Quickly gaining the advantage, the confederates surrounded Parker on three sides before firing and requesting Parker to surrender. According to the Fort Smith New Era, Thorpe's request was "quickly answered by a volley from our muskets that sent consternation into the rebel lines". Realizing the danger Thorpe's cavalry presented to his small force, Parker moved his men into the woods forcing the confederates to dismount. For 2 hours the two sides skirmished until a charge on both of Parker's flanks forced him to retreat. The confederates killed 2 soldiers and captured another 28, as well as 2 wagons. One of those killed was private Benjamin Wilkins who "fell pierced with several bullets, bravely discharging his six-shooter and killing one of his assailants". The 1st Arkansas likewise killed 10 men and wounded 8 others. Parker and around half of his force managed to escape and on his return informed Col. Johnson of the attack, hoping to disrupt Shelby's future movements. Of the 28 captured all but one would be released, as Private Little was shot for being a confederate deserter. Following the battle of Haguewood Prairie, the first Arkansas was presented with a flag made by the ladies of Van Buren, a town the regiment would occasionally be posted at. According to the newspaper Fort Smith New Era, "The ladies of that place made and presented to the 1st Reg't Ark. Infantry, a large Federal flag". They also reported the flag was raised above the Crawford County courthouse with speeches being made by Col Johnson, Lt. Col Searle, and other commanders which were "loudly applauded, and were well calculated to encourage the patriotic aspirations of the numerous assemblage of citizens and soldiers". This event is in direct contrast with the mood in Van Buren at the beginning of the war, as in May 1861 the women of the town had also made a flag for the confederate volunteer company "Pope Walker Guard", which later made up company B of the First Cavalry Regiment, Arkansas State Troops.

In the months following their capture at Fort Smith, the 1st Arkansas ranks had increased to what would be their highest amount during the war, numbering 979 men in total in November. The same month the regiment would see these numbers drop as, during a smallpox vaccination clinic, about 300 men had received a "spurious" or defective vaccine. While vaccines were nothing new, the process of distributing large quantities of them across the union was and as such inadequate vaccines were sometimes issued. Of the 300 men who received the spurious vaccines, some became so sick they were required to be discharged for disability.

==== Election of Col. Johnson ====
By the fall of 1863, steps were taken in both Fort Smith and Little Rock to begin the process of establishing a pro-union government to be recognized in Washington. One of these steps involved holding a mass meeting in Fort Smith with attendees from across the northwestern counties. Held on October 30, the meeting passed several resolutions affirming their commitment to the union cause, including the abolition of slavery. Also decided upon was to send an elected delegate to Congress to represent northwest Arkansas. The recently appointed Captain of Company I, John Whiteford, nominated Col. Johnson which was unanimously agreed upon. On November 23 the election, in which the citizens voted, was held and Johnson won. In December Johnson was granted a leave of absence from the army and departed to Washington, D.C., where he would remain away from his regiment for nearly a year.

==== Winter At Waldron ====
On November 6, the First Arkansas was ordered by Brigadier General John McNeil to occupy the small town of Waldron, located roughly 45 miles south of Fort Smith. Despite the capture of Fort Smith in September, Confederate actively in the region was strong and as such Waldron would serve as the jumping off point for various expeditions and scouts to hunt down rebel forces, often at the direction of Col. Johnson. One such scout occurred on November 13 when Captains Vanderpool and Smith, both of Companies C and G respectively, with around 100-150 men, attacked a confederate camp near Mount Ida. Here they killed 16 and took a similar number as prisoners, including a confederate Major. The attack was a complete surprise and as a result they left behind thousands of pounds of bacon and 10,000 rounds of ammunition which was subsequently captured.

Three weeks following the successful raid at Mount Ida, Col. Johnson led another expedition in the same direction, though this time as far Arkadelphia. Part of his command included Company C which was mounted for the occasion. They reached Mount Ida on December 4 but found no rebels. Johnson then ordered a series of scouts to be sent out across the region. On December 5 Johnson returned to Waldron as his cavalry and battery horses were to worn out to push any further south, though some of his scouts did continue on where they engaged in brief skirmishing and took prisoners.

At Waldron, however, the First Arkansas would face a far more dangerous threat than confederate guerrillas and bushwackers, that being the harsh winter of northwest Arkansas. Enduring heavy snowfall and low temperatures, which reportedly reached as low as negative 12 degrees, the men of the First Arkansas would constantly be on duty searching for confederates, and as a result disease and desertion would plague the regiment. Despite their condition the regiment continued to see more enlistments. In January 1864 three privates from Company G were killed by confederate forces near Waldron. By the time the regiment left Waldron in February, they had lost roughly one third a companies worth of men to disease and desertion but gained 43 new recruits.

=== Camden Expedition ===
In the spring of 1864, the Union Army would launch its last major offensive in Arkansas as part of the ill-fated Red River Campaign. The campaign involved sending the union army in Louisiana to attack the northwestern portion of that state from the south, while the union army in Arkansas was to attack from the north. From there the two armies would meet at Shreveport and then march into Texas. The Arkansas portion of the campaign, known as the Camden Expedition after the fact, was led by Major General Fredrick Steele. In March General Steele, with two divisions, began the offensive and marched south from Little Rock. Union forces in the northwest, which had been organized into the "Frontier Division" under Brigadier General John Thayer, were ordered to link up with Steele at Arkadelphia by April 1.

The First Arkansas, commanded by Lt. Col. Searle, departed Fort Smith on March 24, serving as part of the 1st Brigade of the Frontier Division under Colonel John Edwards. The divisions march was slow and cumbersome, and the deadline of April 1 came and went. Steele, having reached Arkadelphia, waited for Thayer and his division for a few days before deciding to continue south without them, hoping to contact them soon. On April 9 the two forces met at the Little Missouri River but instead of pushing further south Steele ordered the army to head northeast towards the town of Camden to resupply his large and hungry force, a move supported by his divisional commanders.

Through April 10–12 Steele attacked the confederate forces at Prairie D'ane and successfully pushed them back enough to secure a route to Camden, which he started for on the 12th. Sources vary on whether the 1st Arkansas participated in this Battle, though if they were present they likely weren't engaged. On April 13, the frontier division, serving as the rearguard, had not yet departed the prairie and was attacked. All of the 1st Brigade, which included three loyal Arkansas units, was engaged in the fighting and for the first time, the entire regiment participated in an engagement as a full unit. A war correspondent with the Leavenworth Bulletin would state that "The Enemy threw his shell with great accuracy" and that "several shell fell in the ranks of the 1st Arkansas Infantry". The division pushed the confederate attackers back around four miles and the skirmish was over, allowing the division to march through the swampy terrain towards Camden. Of the seven Union soldiers killed during the skirmish three belonged to the 1st Arkansas.

By April 18 the regiment had arrived in Camden and proceeded to do reconnaissance around the city following the Battle of Poison Springs. On April 25 the regiment skirmished with confederate forces around Camden. Camden had not been the answer to the army supply issues as General Steele had hoped and decided to abandon the offensive in favor of returning to Little Rock. With confederate forces following close behind, the army left Camden on April 26, leaving behind the sick and wounded. On April 29 the army arrived at Jenkins Ferry located on the swollen Saline River, 50 miles south of Little Rock. The army hastily constructed a pontoon bridge across the River hoping to be north of the it before any substantial rebel attack. On the morning of April 30 the confederates, which had perused the army since the 28th, launched an attack and, while most of the armies cavalry and artillery had crossed, much of the infantry still remained south of the Saline, including the 1st Arkansas.

In the opening hours of the Battle of Jenkins Ferry, the regiment remained north of the fighting but General Thayer later sent them to the action along with the 12th Kansas Infantry. Brigadier General Samuel Rice then sent the two regiments to bolster the Union left flank. As the battle raged the 1st Arkansas mostly maintained a defensive position, re-enforcing the union left against any move on their flank, thus sparing the regiment from any high casualties. During the last major attack of the battle, the union left was charged by two Texas brigades. Major Frank Johnson, then the Captain of Company B, would later report that the regiment helped repulse this move on their flank with "considerable loss to the enemy, and losing no men itself".

Captain John Whiteford of Company I would later recount the battle in a letter to his wife -

We fought all day on swampy land The night before we were up all night in the rain in line of battle, and during the fight we were up to our knees in water, and when we had drove the enemy back we had to march on return four miles through mud knee deep.

By 2:00 PM the Battle, the largest engagement the regiment would partake in, was over and the 1st Arkansas crossed the Saline River and headed north to Little Rock. In order to quickly cross through the flooding and mud, Steele had ordered that there be only one wagon to each brigade and many army records would be destroyed, including a few personnel records from Company D. The flag of the 1st Arkansas was also nearly ruined but was saved by an African American man named Pete. Pete, who was attached to the regiment, saw the flag and, according to the Fort Smith New Era, "rolled it up and carried it on his back all the way to Little Rock", thereby saving it from destruction. Similar to their march to Springfield in the spring of 1863, the 1st Arkansas proceeded to Little Rock with only what they could carry on their backs due to a lack of adequate transportation. On May 3 the regiment reached Little Rock where they rested for four days before taking up the line of march again on the 7th towards Fort Smith. Arriving on the 16th they were placed on garrison duty for the remainder of the summer.

=== Service on the Frontier 1864-1865 ===
During the July 4th festivities at Fort Smith, the regiment was reported as arriving in "fine style of martial array and with their regimental band at the head of the column". The celebrations that began the month of July were replaced by the shot and shells of confederate artillery at the end. On July 29 confederate artillery began attacking the Fort but was driven off by the 2nd Kansas Battery. The attack sent anxiety through the unionists in the northwest and the Fort took on even more refugees as a result, refugees that no doubt included relatives of the 1st Arkansas. On August 29, Captain Vanderpool was sent on a scouting mission with around 40 men from Company C and throughout September, October, and November, Vanderpool and his men would skirmish with confederate forces in Washington, Sebastian, and Newton Counties, seeing in all 5 men killed. Notably, they skirmished with soldiers belonging to Colonel William Brooks and Major General James Fagan following their raid into Missouri in early November.

In September Col. Johnson returned from Washington, D.C., and again assumed command of the regiment. Despite his efforts, his election was not recognized by Congress and they refused to seat him. Johnson also worked for President Lincoln's re-election campaign in Baltimore in the summer before returning to Arkansas. On November 7 Johnson was ordered to march the regiment east to escort a commissary train from Little Rock to Fort Smith. After marching 50 miles the train was reached and they proceeded back to Fort Smith unmolested, arriving on the 15th. By the fall of 1864, Fort Smith was in great need of supplies for both the soldiers stationed there and the refugees. Confederate activity in the region was also very much present. The previous month a foraging party from the 1st Arkansas was attacked and, while they successfully killed three rebels, one man was wounded and later had his leg amputated. A soldier later remarked that "It is hard that a good loyal man should lose his leg for three rebels." Attacks on union food supplies would continue and the status of Fort Smith was further weakened. On November 28 the regiment was ordered to escort 117 prisoners to Fort Gibson and report to Colonel Stephen H. Wattles. The prisoners belonged to Major General Sterling Price and, like many of the 1st Arkansas, were confederate deserters who left at the first chance they could. Eight companies of the regiment proceeded to Fort Gibson while Companies A and D remained at Fort Smith.

==== Attempted Evacuation of Fort Smith ====
On December 5 General Edward R. S. Canby ordered that Fort Smith be evacuated because of the post's lack of adequate supplies. This order was met with shock and anger in Arkansas, including in the union state government in Little Rock. Three colonels of Arkansas union regiments, including Col. Johnson, wrote a letter to President Lincoln and, referring to the loyal Arkansas units at Fort Smith, wrote the following about the effects of Fort Smith being abandoned -

It is now garrisoned in part by these regiments, and the families of the soldiers are living in the country adjacent, and even were they fortunate enough, in the great scarcity of transportation, to get away with their lives, would have to leave all their possessions behind, come to our military posts as beggars, and be the despised and contemned refugees of this war. Those who would be left behind would become the prey of rebel desperadoes.

On January 10, 1865, after protests from the state government and military officials, General Ulysses S. Grant countermanded General Canby's evacuation order and Fort Smith remained occupied. Some union families had evacuated before this order was received but military troops remained in the region. While this was happening eight companies of the 1st Arkansas were stationed at Fort Gibson with companies A and D still present at Fort Smith. By January the regiment returned from Gibson and was back under the command of Lt. Col. Searle as Col. Johnson once again left to attend the next session of Congress in another effort to be recognized. He would return to the regiment in April.

=== Mustering out ===
In 1865 much of the frontier began to quite down and by summer the Civil War was over. The First Regiment of Arkansas Infantry Volunteers was mustered out on August 10, 1865, serving the union for over 2 years.

== Attachment ==
The 1st Arkansas Infantry was attached to District Southwest Missouri, Dept. Missouri to December 1863. The 1st Arkansas was attached to 2nd Brigade, District of the Frontier, Dept. Missouri, to January 1864. The regiment was attached to 2nd Brigade, District of the Frontier, 7th Army Corps, Dept. of Arkansas, to March 1864. The regiment was attached to 1st Brigade, District of the Frontier, 7th Army Corps, to February 1865. 1st Brigade, 3rd Division, 7th Army Corps, to August 1865.

== See also ==
- List of Arkansas Civil War Union units
- List of United States Colored Troops Civil War Units
- Arkansas in the American Civil War

== Bibliography ==
- Dyer, Frederick H. (1959). A Compendium of the War of the Rebellion. New York and London. Thomas Yoseloff, Publisher. LCCN 59-12963.
- Bishop, Albert W. (1867). Report of the Adjutant General of Arkansas, for the Period of the Late Rebellion, and to November 1, 1866., (Washington : Govt. print. off., 1867).
