= Company B, 1st Tennessee Heavy Artillery =

- Active: 1861–1864
- Disbanded: November 19, 1864
- Country: Confederate States of America
- Allegiance: CSA
- Branch: Artillery
- Size: Battery
- Nickname: McCown Guards
- Engagements: American Civil War: Battle of Island No. 10; Siege of Vicksburg

Commanders
- 1861: Captain Datus Whitaker (Whit) Harris
- 1861-1864: Captain Paul Thomas Dismukes

Company B, 1st Tennessee Heavy Artillery (1861-1864) was a Confederate Army artillery battery during the American Civil War. While the unit was assigned to a Tennessee Artillery Regiment, it was originally organized as the McCown Guards or the McCown Guards Artillery, a volunteer company organized in Lafayette County, Arkansas. Also known as: Company A, 1st Tennessee Heavy Artillery and/or Dismukes' Battery.

== Organization ==
An infantry company known as the "McCown Guards", was recruited in Columbia and Lafayette counties, Arkansas and organized at Lamartine, Arkansas, on December 6, 1861, under the command of Captain Datus Whitaker (Whit) Harris. Captain Harris succeeded as captain by First Lieut. Paul Thomas Dismukes, date uncertain. Dismukes had originally served as a Sergeant in the Invincible Guards, a militia company raised at Magnolia, in Columbia County, Arkansas, which became a company in the 5th Regiment, Arkansas State Troops.

The company was originally recruited for the 15th (Johnson/Gee) Arkansas Infantry, but was sidetracked into the artillery service before it joined the 15th Arkansas. The unit was sent east of the Mississippi River, and converted to an artillery battery where it would eventually be assigned to the 1st Tennessee Heavy Artillery as (2nd) Company A.

One of the original company offices, First Lieutenant William M. Hughey, would go on to serve in Shoup's Mountain Battery and the 8th Arkansas Field Battery.

== Service ==
Dismuke's battery probably first became associated with heavy artillery at Columbus, Kentucky in the winter of 1862. While initially serving as the first major Confederate bastion on the Mississippi River, Columbus became untendable when Fort Henry and then Fort Donelson fell to Union forces in early February 1862. Columbus was cut off from rest of the Confederate Army, and faced capture by Union troops advancing overland from the Tennessee River to the Mississippi. To avoid losing the garrison and its equipment, General Beauregard ordered that the position be abandoned as quietly as possible. The process began on February 24, when the first members of the Columbus garrison arrived at Island No. 10. Two days later, its new commander, Brig. Gen. John P. McCown, arrived, and immediately set to work to strengthen the position McCown, was able to transform the island and nearby mainland into a formidable obstacle for any fleet attempting to pass. By the middle of March, five batteries containing 24 guns had been built on the shore above the island; 19 guns were in five batteries on the island itself; and the floating battery New Orleans, with nine guns, was moored at the west end of the island. McCown was eventually replaced in command at the island by Brig. Gen. William W. Mackall.

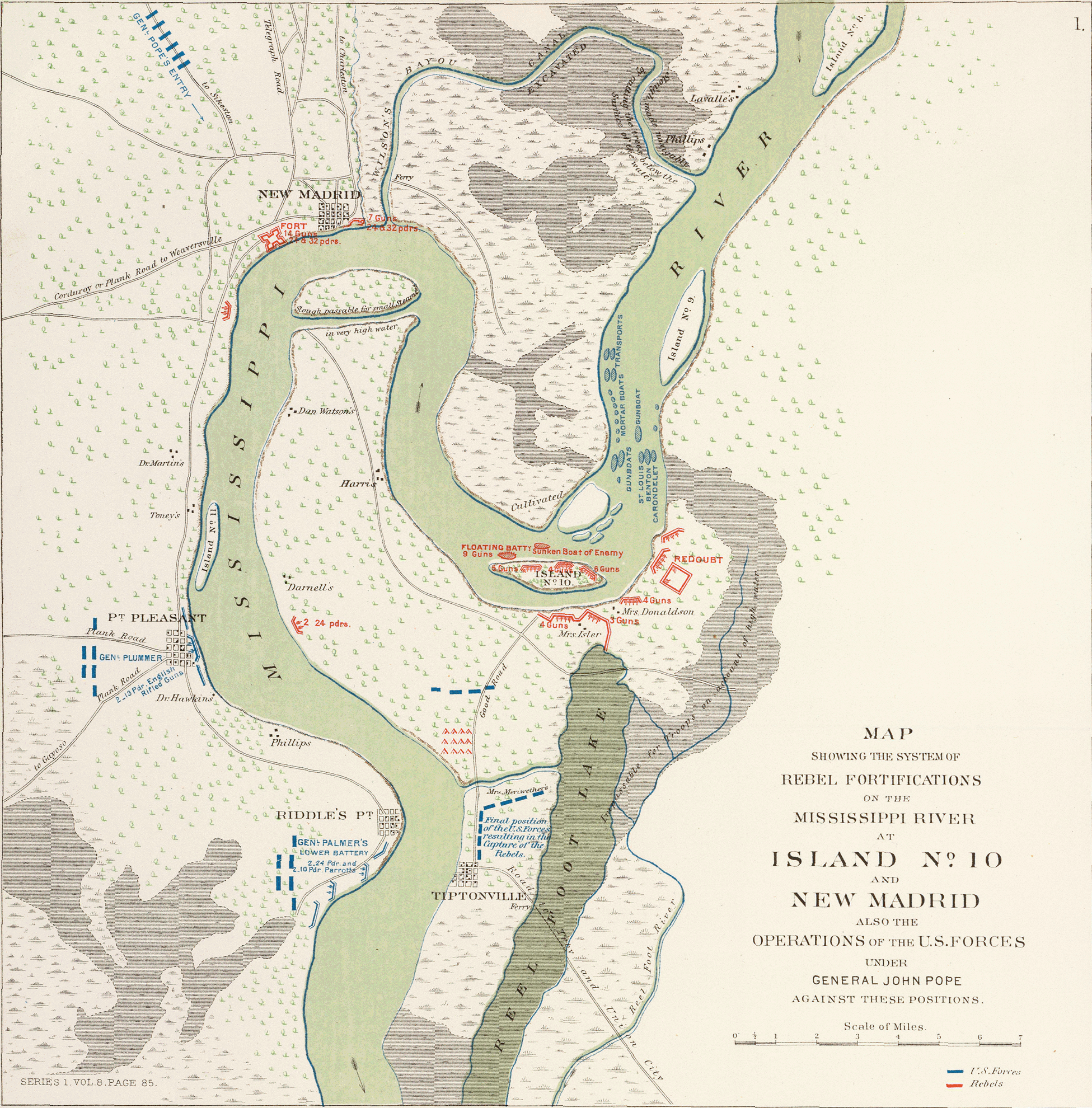
Siege of Island Number 10

=== Island No. 10 ===
Dismuke's battery was part of the heavy artillery which had just arrived at Madrid Bend on March 1, 1862. It appears that Captain Harris and Lieutenant Hughey had already left the battery before it moved to New Madrid. The battery officers during this period appear to have been:

- Captain Paul T. Dismukes
- First Lieutenant Robert H. Howell
- First Lieutenant George T. Moorman
- Second Lieutenant Philip P. Frazier
- Second Lieutenant Wash T. Dickson

Union gunboats and mortars arrived on March 15, and the siege of Island No. 10 began. Union ground forces led by General John Pope, in New Madrid, and Union naval forces led by Admiral Andrew Hull Foote, upstream of the bend, were kept apart by Island No. 10. From the first, they did not agree how to go about conducting the operation. Pope wanted immediate action; Foote hoped to subdue the island by the slow process of bombardment. As early as March 17, Pope was asking that two or three gunboats run past the Confederate batteries, to enable him to cross the river and trap the entire garrison. Foote demurred, arguing that his boats were not invincible. For the next two weeks, fighting consisted of bombardment of the island at rather long range, mostly conducted by the mortars, and occasionally replied to by the Confederate batteries.

On April 4, the Union gunboat Carondelet made her way downstream, and was not discovered until she was abreast of the Confederate Battery No. 2. The batteries opened, but their fire was inaccurate, and Carondelet completed the run unscathed. Two nights later, USS Pittsburg made a similar run. On April 7, Pope made his move, and transports carried his troops across, landing on the Tennessee side of the river, thus threatening the Confederate positions from the rear. Realizing that his position was hopeless, Mackall put the men on the mainland in motion in the direction of Tiptonville.

Dismuke's battery evacuated its positions at Madrid Bend on April 7, 1862, along with other artillery units under Captain Andrew Jackson, Jr. They escaped across Reelfoot Lake and reached Memphis April 14, 1862 with 36 men.

The 1st Tennessee Heavy Artillery Regiment was organized at Fort Pillow, Tennessee, on May 10, 1862, composed of ten companies which had previously served as independent batteries. Dismukes' Arkansas Battery was designated as Company B, and Hoadley's Arkansas Battery as Company H. The field grade officers of the regiment were:

- Colonel-Andrew Jackson, Jr.,
- Lieutenant Colonel-Robert Sterling
- Major Frederick W. Hoadley.

It appears that First Lieutenant George T. Moorman and Second Lieutenant Wash T. Dickson were not with the unit when it reorganized at Fort Pillow following its escape from Island No. 10. The battery officers at the time of the formation of 1st Tennessee Heavy Artillery were:

- Captain Paul T. Dismukes
- First Lieutenant Robert H. Howell
- First Lieutenant Peter F. Smith
- Second Lieutenant Philip P. Frazier

General Villepigue began the evacuation of Fort Pillow on the Mississippi River at the end of May 1862. By June 4, it had been abandoned and the troops sent down to Memphis to be dispersed from there to other points. The heavy artillery was needed at Vicksburg which was then being hurriedly fortified and armed as the next bastion further down the Mississippi River. The 1st Tennessee Heavy Artillery was embarked on the Steamer Golden Age on June 2, 1862, for Vicksburg.

=== Siege of Vicksburg ===
Upon arrival at Vicksburg, the 1st Tennessee Heavy Artillery was consolidated by order of Brigadier General M. L. Smith on June 18, 1862 due to depleted numbers, there were only about 330 men at the time. On June 18, 1862 General Smith ordered the regiment temporarily consolidated into four companies, Company A was composed of Dismukes' (old) Co. B and part of Maley's (old) Company C. In the consolidation additional changes were made to the battery officers. First Lieutenant Peter F. Smith was dropped from the rolls and >

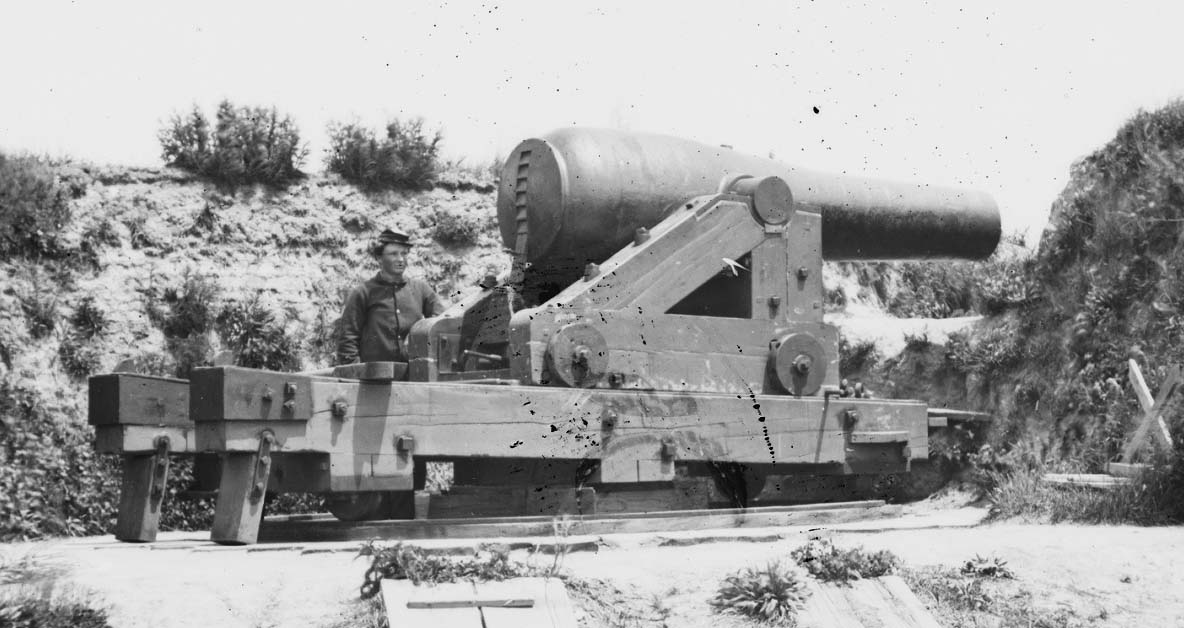

Second Lieutenant Philip P. Frazier transferred to another battery. So the battery officers during the Siege of Vicksburg were:

- Captain Paul T. Dismukes
- First Lieutenant Robert H. Howell
- First Lieutenant John B Baggett
- First Lieutenant M. L. Smith transferred from Postelwhaite's Btry June 18, 1862 (Resigned April 30, 1864)
- Second Lieutenant Ed J. Thompson transferred from Postelwhaite's Btry June 18, 1862. (Resigned October 28, 1862)
- Second Lieutenant Stephen M Corbitt transferred from Upton's btry June 18, 62

During the Siege of Vicksburg, the 1st Tennessee Heavy Artillery, commanded by Colonel Andrew Jackson, Jr., was placed in charge of the upper batteries, from Fort Hill to the upper bayou, under the overall command of Colonel Edward Higgins. Dismukes Company, now Company A of the 1st Tennessee Heavy Artillery, served one 10-inch Columbiad gun in the Wyman's Hill Battery.

Colonel Jackson reported on the passage of the batteries by enemy boats on the night of April 2, 1863, in which 391 shots were fired by the regiment. During the siege, Major Hoadley was killed on June 8, 1863, and Major Upton, who succeeded him, had his arm so badly smashed it had to be amputated.

The battery, along with the rest of the 1st Tennessee Heavy Artillery regiment was surrendered and paroled as part of Brigadier General John C. Moore's Brigade on July 4, 1863.

The 1st Tennessee Heavy Artillery regiment was ordered to parole camp at Demopolis, Alabama; then to Atlanta, Georgia; and from there to Marietta, Georgia. It was declared exchanged December 6, 1863, and ordered to Mobile on December 11, 1863, to the Appalachee Batteries, December 20, 1863. It is unclear how much of Captain Dismuke's battery accompanied the regiment to parole camp. The picture of the battery is pretty murky from 1863 onwards."

General U. S. Grant initially demanded the conditional surrender of the Vicksburg garrison, but faced with the necessity of feeding 30,000 starving Confederates and having the idea that these soldiers might do more harm to the Confederate cause by being released to return home rather than being exchanged as whole units, he relented and allowed for the immediate parole of the unit. According to the Confederate War Department, the Union leaders encouraged the surrendered Confederates to simply return home, rather than being officially paroled and exchanged. The able bodied Confederate soldiers who were released on parole walked out of Vicksburg (they were not allowed to proceed in any military formations) on July 11, 1863. Paroling of these able bodied men was completed in their respective regimental camps inside Vicksburg prior to July 11. Those who were wounded or sick in the various hospitals in Vicksburg were paroled, and were released, as soon as they could leave on their own. July 15/16 is the most common date of these Vicksburg hospital paroles. Some of the most seriously wounded and sick were sent by steamship down the Mississippi River and over to Mobile, Alabama, where they were delivered on parole to Confederate authorities.

Confederate commanders designated Enterprise, Mississippi, and Demopolis, Alabama as the rendezvous points (parole camps) for the Vicksburg parolees to report to after they got clear of the last Federal control point at Big Black Bridge. Most of the Arkansas units appeared to have bypassed the established parole camps, and possibly with the support, or at least by the compliancy, of their Union captors, simply crossed the river and returned home. Because so many of the Vicksburg parolees, especially from Arkansas, simply went home, Major General Pemberton requested Confederate President Davis grant the men a thirty to sixty-day furlough. The furloughs were not strictly adhered to so long as the soldier eventually showed up at a parole camp to be declared exchanged and returned to duty. Those who went directly home were treated as if they had been home on furlough if they eventually reported into one of these two parole centers. The exchange declaration reports issued by Colonel Robert Ould in Richmond for various units in the Vicksburg and Port Hudson surrenders began in September 1863 based upon men who actually reported into one of the two parole camps. Pemberton eventually coordinated with the Confederate War Department and Confederate General Kirby Smith, commanding the Department of the Trans-Mississippi to have the Arkansas Vicksburg parolee's rendezvous point established at Camden, Arkansas.

=== Fort Morgan ===
Federal efforts to prevent the immediate re-organization of Confederate forces surrendered at Vicksburg met with some success. A final consolidation of the 1st Tennessee Heavy Artillery Regiment was ordered by Maj. Gen. Dabney H. Maury on February 4, 1864, due to the fact that the men were scattered all over the place after being paroled at Vicksburg. "A number of the men, after being furloughed when paroled, joined the cavalry in North Mississippi and West Tennessee, and are now on duty with General Forrest's Command. Every effort to have these men returned to the regiment has failed." It appears that some of Dismukes battery did remain with the 1st Tennessee Heavy Artillery following the Vicksburg Campaign.

Although regimental reports stated the 1st Tennessee Heavy Artillery was declared exchanged on December 6, 1863, an order from the Adjutant and Inspector General's Office dated February 1, 1864, read: "All officers and men of the Vicksburg Capture belonging to the 1st Tennessee Heavy Artillery, who reported for duty at Marietta and whose names were reported by Colonel A. Jackson, are declared exchanged.". On February 4, by order of Major General D. H. Maury, commanding the District of the Gulf, the regiment was consolidated into two companies A and B, (third organization). The regiment moved to Fort Morgan, Alabama on April 3, 1864. On August 12, 1864, Brigadier General Asboth, U.S.A., reported: "The garrison at Fort Morgan numbers 600 men, 400 from the 1st Alabama Artillery, 200 from the 1st Tennessee Artillery, with General Page in command, and determined to hold the fort till the last man." On August 23, the fort having been reduced to ruins, and further resistance impossible, General Page surrendered. In his report he pays tribute to Colonel Jackson, and to Captains Johnston and Fisher and their men, for their valiant and efficient service. At least three original members of Dismukes' Battery, including First Lieutenant Robert A. Howell were still assigned to the unit when it was surrendered with the garrison of Fort Morgan, Alabama on August 23, 1864.

Remnants of the 1st Tennessee Heavy Artillery that escaped captured at Fort Morgan were merged into the Winston's Tennessee Light Artillery under Lt Simon R. Hayman and were captured with the battery during the assault on Fort Blakeley, Alabama, near Mobile on April 9, 1865.

=== Trans-Mississippi ===
It appears that other members of the battery, including Captain Dismukes, probably chose to cross back across the Mississippi River after the fall of Vicksburg, rather than report to the parole camps and be exchanged. Dismukes apparently re-formed his unit in Arkansas. The last reference to this company in the historical record is dated November 19, 1864, when a siege train company, 1st Tennessee Heavy Artillery, under Capt. Paul T. Dismukes, is listed among the forces of the Trans-Mississippi Department.

== Surrender ==
The Army of the Trans-Mississippi was surrendered by General Kirby Smith on May 26, 1865. The date of the military convention between Confederate General Edmund Kirby Smith and Union General Edward Canby for the surrender of the troops and public property in the Trans-Mississippi Department was May 26, 1865, however, it took a while for parole commissioners to be appointed and for public property to be accounted for. As a result, a final report of field artillery which was part of the accounting process, was not completed until June 1, 1865. Capt. Paul T. Dismukes' 1st Tennessee Heavy Artillery, is not listed in the final accounting of Confederate Government property in the Department of the Trans-Mississippi. It may be that the organization had been consolidated with other units or disbanded altogether before the surrender.

== See also ==
- List of Confederate units from Arkansas
- Confederate Units by State
