= Woolsey, Arkansas =

- Unincorporated community
- Woolsey's position in Arkansas. Woolsey, Arkansas (the United States)
- Coordinates: 35°53′07″N 94°10′07″W
- Country: United States
- State: Arkansas
- County: Washington
- Township: Crawford
- Elevation: 1,362 ft (415 m)
- Time zone: UTC-6 (Central (CST))
  - Summer (DST): UTC-5 (CDT)
- Area code: 479
- GNIS feature ID: 78809

Woolsey, Arkansas (formerly Woolseys, Arkansas) is an unincorporated community in Crawford Township, Washington County, Arkansas, United States. It is located on U.S. Route 71 between West Fork and Winslow. The community contains the Woolsey Cemetery and Brown Bluff (3WA10), and is the namesake of the Woolsey Bridge, all on the National Register of Historic Places.
