= West Fork High School =

West Fork High School may refer to:

- West Fork High School (Arkansas), located in West Fork, Arkansas.
- West Fork High School (Iowa), located in Sheffield, Iowa.
- West Fork High School (Texas), located in New Caney, Texas
