= Battle of Fayetteville =

Battle of Fayetteville may refer to the following battles during the American Civil War:

- Battle of Fayetteville (1862), a battle fought in Fayetteville, Virginia (now West Virginia)
- Battle of Fayetteville (1863), a battle fought in Fayetteville, Arkansas

== See also ==
- Battle of Fayetteville Road, a battle fought in North Carolina in 1865
