= West Fork School District =

West Fork School District may refer to:

- West Fork School District (Arkansas)
- West Fork Community School District (Iowa)
