= Woolsey Bridge =

- Formerly listed on the U.S. National Register of Historic Places
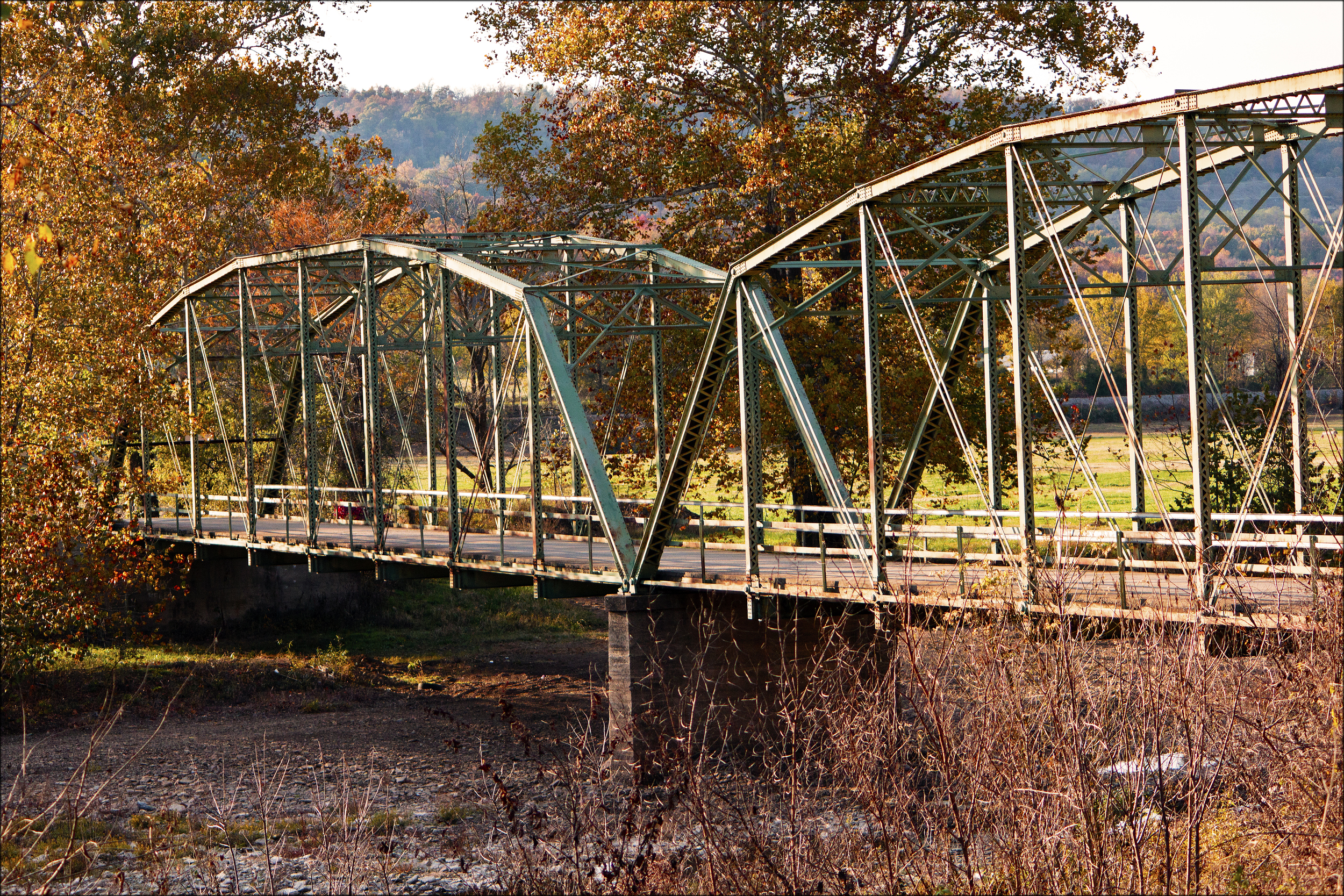
- Woolsey Bridge, 2011 (facing northwest)

- Location within Arkansas Location within the United States
- Nearest city: Woolsey, Arkansas
- Coordinates: 35°53′08″N 94°10′10″W
- Area: Washington County
- Built: 1925
- Architectural style: Two pin-connected, 8-panel Parker through trusses
- MPS: Historic Bridges of Arkansas MPS
- NRHP reference No.: 00000637

Significant dates
- Added to NRHP: June 9, 2000
- Removed from NRHP: January 16, 2026

Woolsey Bridge (NRHP listed as Washington County Road 35 Bridge) was a truss bridge built in 1925, formerly located near West Fork, Arkansas. It carried County Route 35 over the West Fork of the White River for 303 feet (92 m).

== History ==
The bridge is historic as the only surviving bridge in the area built in the camelback style. Engineered in a distinct way, the camelback truss is uncommon and this well-preserved example was listed on the National Register of Historic Places on June 9, 2000. The National Park Service removed the Washington County Road 35 Bridge from the National Register of Historic Places on January 16, 2026.

== Design ==
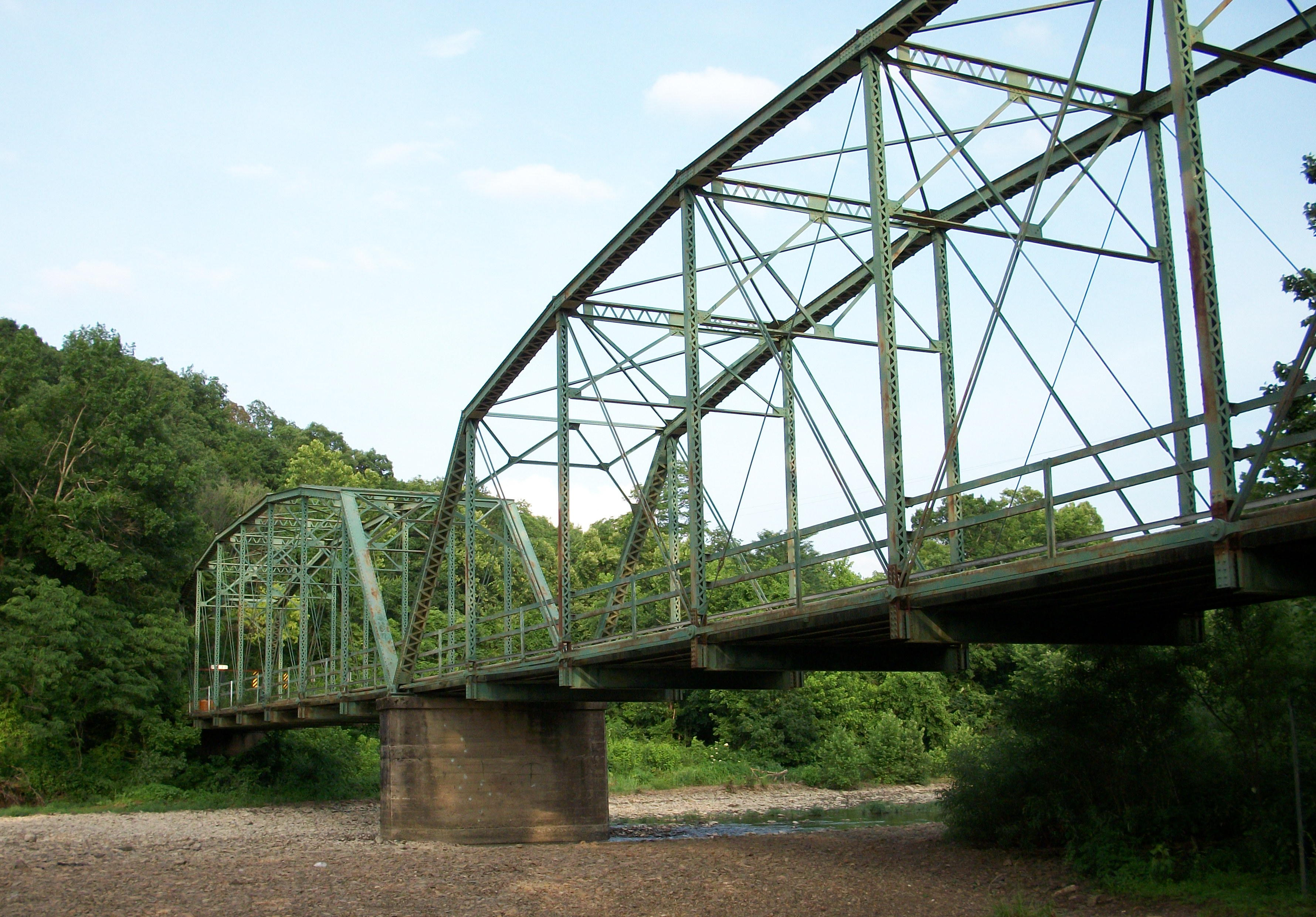
Oblique view

Bridge designers and engineers of the early 20th century had seen the Pratt truss prove itself as a durable and economically feasible bridge. The Woolsey Bridge was designed as a camelback through truss design. The camelback is a modification of the Pratt truss by Charles H. Parker that features a top chord that is not parallel to the bottom chord. Although stronger in the center than parallel bridges, the style is less common due to its complexity. The Woolsey Bridge was likely built by a county workforce in 1925, possibly consisting of area residents.

== Status ==
The bridge was closed to traffic in January, 2015 and a replacement bridge opened in 2018. The old bridge was disassembled and given to the town of West Fork with the intention it would be repurposed into a pedestrian bridge.

== See also ==
- List of bridges documented by the Historic American Engineering Record in Arkansas
- List of bridges on the National Register of Historic Places in Arkansas
- National Register of Historic Places listings in Washington County, Arkansas
