= Mineral Springs Community Building =

Historic church in Arkansas, United States

- U.S. National Register of Historic Places
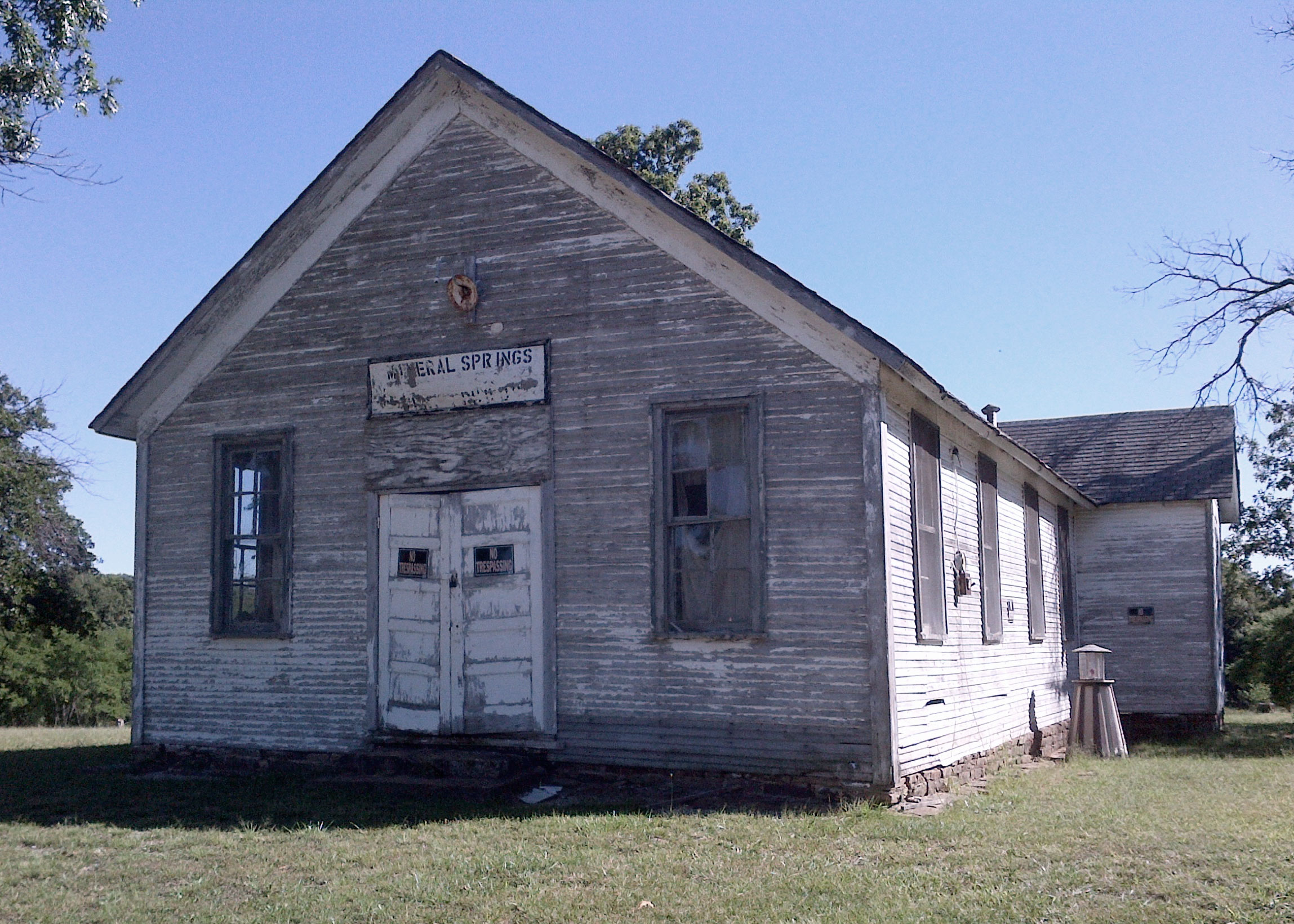

- Location within Arkansas Location within the United States
- Nearest city: West Fork, Arkansas
- Coordinates: 35°55′37″N 94°8′6″W
- Area: less than one acre
- Built: 1915
- Architectural style: Bungalow/craftsman
- NRHP reference No.: 98000580
- Added to NRHP: May 29, 1998

The Mineral Springs Community Building is a historic multiuse civic building on County Road 34 (Green Road) in rural Washington County, Arkansas east of West Fork. It is a modest single-story wood-frame structure, with a gable roof, clapboard siding, and a stone foundation. It was built in 1915 and enlarged in 1947, giving it its present T shape. The building served the local community as a school, town meeting hall, and church, with the use as a school ending in 1946. The building is a significant example of a surviving one-room schoolhouse in the county.

The building was listed on the National Register of Historic Places in 1998.

== See also ==
- National Register of Historic Places listings in Washington County, Arkansas
