= Brown Bluff (Washington County, Arkansas) =

Archaeological site in Arkansas, United States

- Brown Bluff (3WA10)
- U.S. National Register of Historic Places
- Nearest city: Woolsey, Arkansas
- Area: 1 acre (0.40 ha)
- NRHP reference No.: 86002946
- Added to NRHP: June 24, 1987

Brown Bluff is a rock art site in Washington County, Arkansas. The site consists of a prepared panel of sandstone extending some 80 metres (87 yd), on which have been painted pictographs in red. The site has been estimated to date to the Mississippian period, c. AD 1100–1600. The artwork is reminiscent of artwork found in the Arkansas River valley, and is one of the few places such artwork has been found in the western Ozark Mountains.

The site was listed on the National Register of Historic Places in 1987.

== See also ==
- National Register of Historic Places listings in Washington County, Arkansas
