= Battle of Fayetteville (1863) =

Battle of the American Civil War

- Part of the American Civil War
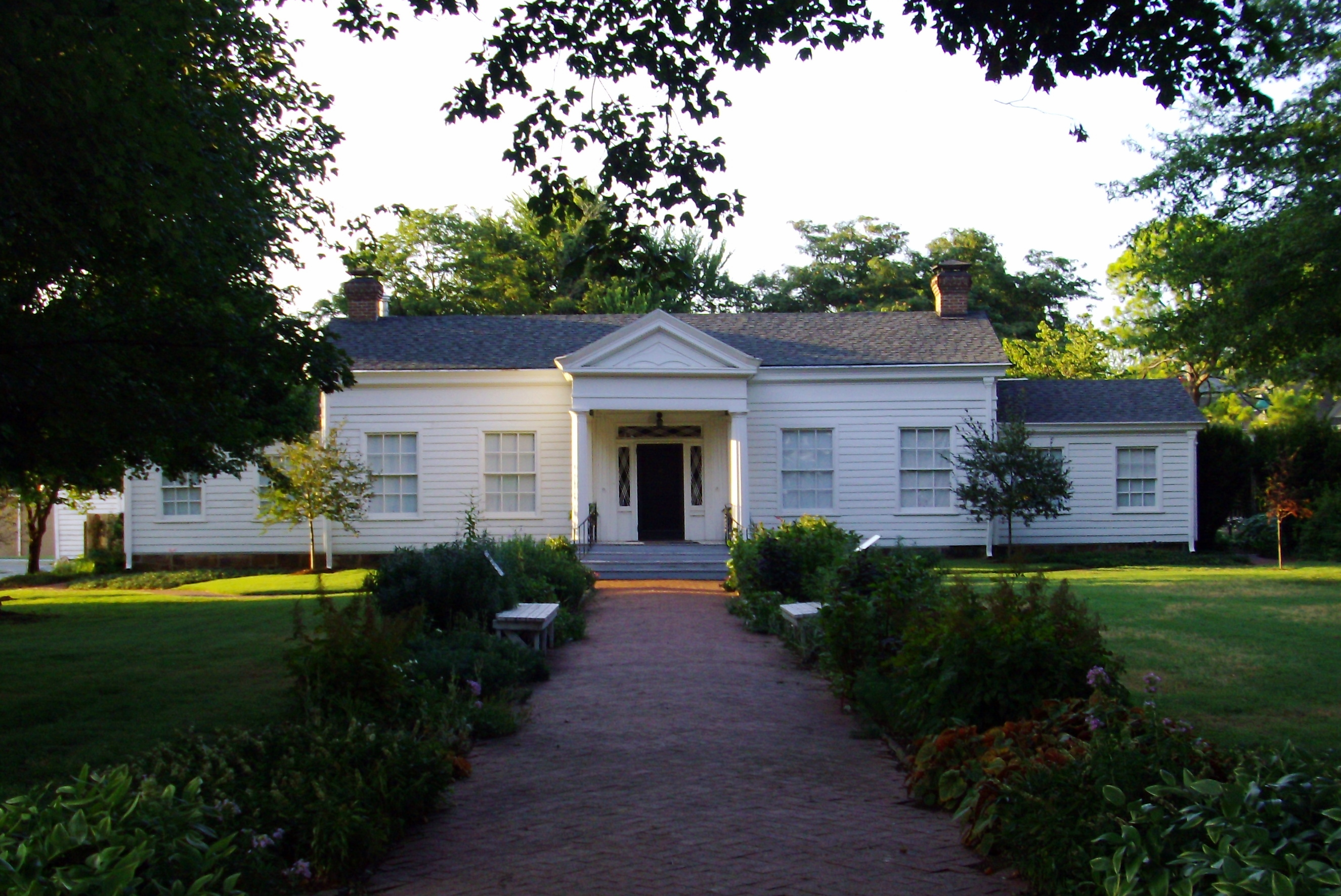
- Union headquarters during the action at Fayetteville (present-day Washington County Historical Society).
Date	April 18, 1863
Location	Washington County, Arkansas 36°04′00.4″N 94°09′24.8″W
Result	Union victory

Belligerents
United States	Confederate States

Commanders and leaders
(United States) Col. M. La Rue Harrison	(Confederate States of America) Brig. Gen. William L. Cabell

Units involved
Post of Fayetteville: 1st Arkansas Cavalry; 1st Arkansas Infantry	Cabell's Brigade: Monroe's regiment; Carroll's regiment; Dorsey's squadron; [John F.] Hill's battalion (less three companies); Hughey's battery

Strength
300–400 troops	900 cavalry 2 guns

Casualties and losses
4 dead and 77 wounded or missing	~ 20 dead and 50 wounded or missing

The Battle of Fayetteville, also known as the Action at Fayetteville, took place during the American Civil War on April 18, 1863, in Fayetteville, Arkansas.

== Battle ==
Confederate brigadier-general William L. Cabell departed Ozark, Arkansas with 900 cavalry, intending to retake Fayetteville, Arkansas, which had been occupied by the United States Army after its victory months earlier at the Battle of Prairie Grove. Approaching the town from the south, Cabell's men captured a nine-man Federal picket near West Fork, Arkansas on the night of April 17. The following morning, Cabell lost the element of surprise when his men skirmished with dismounted Federal pickets in east Fayetteville. The Confederates climbed East Mountain and Hughey's Battery opened fire on the garrison with its artillery. Federal Colonel M. La Rue Harrison deployed three companies of the 1st Arkansas Infantry to counter the threat.

At about 6.00 am, Cabell ordered a charge on the city, hoping to capture the Federal commanders at the Tebbetts place, where they made their headquarters. The attackers halted as they waited for their artillery to shell the house into surrendering. Confederate colonel James C. Monroe now led a flank attack on the city, managing to take the Baxter House. The Confederates continued into Fayetteville, taking prisoners and destroying a supply train. However, the Federal forces finally rallied and halted any further Confederate advances.

Harrison ordered an advance on the Confederate artillery upon East Mountain. Meanwhile, Monroe led his cavalry up Dickson Street in one last attempt to capture the Federal headquarters. The crossfire was too heavy and Monroe withdrew his men. The Confederate artillery on the mountain was now both under attack and out of ammunition. Cabell reluctantly ordered his men to fall back and thus the battle ended in a draw. Nevertheless, he had failed in his objective and Federal troops retained control of the town.

The Battle of Fayetteville was a tactical victory for Colonel Harrison and the Union forces, but a strategic one for General Cabell and the Confederates. The Unionists held the field, but felt insecure afterward and a week later withdrew from Fayetteville and retreated into Missouri. Union troops did not return again to Fayetteville until September 1863.

== Battlefield preservation ==
Union headquarters during the action at Fayetteville, also known as ″the Colonel Tebbetts place,″ is home to the Washington County Historical Society.

== See also ==
- Arkansas in the American Civil War
- Trans-Mississippi Theater of the American Civil War
