= Shoup's Mountain Battery =

Shoup's Mountain Battery (Confederate)
- Active: 1862
- Disbanded: January 16, 1862
- Country: Confederate States
- Allegiance: Arkansas
- Branch: Confederate States Army
- Type: Battery
- Role: Artillery
- Engagements: American Civil War: Battle of Cane Hill; Battle of Prairie Grove

Commanders
- 1862-1863: James C. Shoup

The Shoup's Mountain Battery was a Confederate Army artillery battery during the American Civil War. It was also known as Shoup's Battery. At least two of the battery officers later served in the 8th Arkansas Field Battery.

== Organization ==
After the battle of Pea Ridge, General Earl Van Dorn was ordered to move his Army of the West across the Mississippi and cooperate with Confederate forces in Northern Mississippi. Van Dorn stripped the state of military hardware of all types, including almost all the serviceable artillery. When General Thomas C. Hindman arrived to assume command of the new Trans-Mississippi District, he found almost nothing to command. He quickly began organizing new regiments, but his most pressing need was for arms for the new forces he was organizing, including the artillery. With Hindman's first order, dated May 31, 1862 at Little Rock, he announced his staff, including the appointment of Major Francis A. Shoup, Chief of Artillery. Shoup had served as chief of artillery under General William J. Hardee. He was involved in the formation of the artillery position known as "Ruggle's Battery" during the Battle of Shiloh. Shoup, and his son, James C. Shoup came west across the Mississippi with General Hindman in May 1862. Hindman ordered guns, which the United States Arsenal had decommissioned and buried as property markers around the Arsenal in Little Rock, to be dug up and refurbished as best possible as serviceable weapons. Hindman was almost totally destitute of military quality weapons and could hardly arm or issue ammunition to the few troops that he had in June 1862. Until the shipments of arms in August 1862, General Hindman struggled to arm his conscripts.

Hindman sent numerous requests for arms back across the Mississippi River. In one report he requested that he be sent twelve Model 1841 12 Pound Mountain Howitzers. These guns were considered useless in other theaters because of their short range. Most of the weapons transferred to the Trans Mississippi District from Vicksburg in the "Fairplay Affair" were the castoffs and unusable weapons from the various state armories which had been returned to those armories after the Confederate armies east of the Mississippi had been re-equipped from the "Battlefield Quartermaster" of 7 Days, 2nd Manassas and Harper Ferry.

Hindman also drew on ordnance from Fort Washita in Oklahoma where General Albert Pike complained that he had ten fine Parrott Guns which could not be used for lack of limbers and harnesses. The muster rolls of the 24th Arkansas contain notes regarding a detachment being sent on detach assignment to Oklahoma to bring artillery to Camp White Sulphur Springs, near Pine Bluff.

When Gen M.M. Parson's Brigade returned to Arkansas from Van Dorn's Army in Mississippi in August 1862, he brought with him a wagon train of quartermaster supplies and twenty five pieces of unattached artillery and supplies. At the same time a shipment of 11,000 arms arrived at Pine Bluff from Vicksburg by way of Monroe, La. out of a shipment of 18,000 that were originally sent. 5,000 of those 18,000 were captured on the steamer "Fair Play" by the Union and 2,500 of them went to General Richard Taylor's army in Louisiana. These weapons had come from the arsenal of eastern Confederate states that had been returned to the state arsenals as the Confederates had re-equipped themselves with the better captured Union arms. It is reported in the Official Records of the "Fair Play" that some of those weapons had come from captured Union weapons at the Battle of 2nd Manassas. The movement of the twenty-five pieces of artillery to Arkansas by Parson's Brigade was reported in Bull's "Missouri Brothers in Gray" and the Hindman Telegraphs about "secret" moves of wagons and a wagon train with Parson's Brigade being sent to Little Rock when it reached Pine Bluff in early August 1862. The quantity of guns supplied by Parson's led to the sudden organization and reorganization of several Artillery batteries in August and September 1862 in Arkansas.

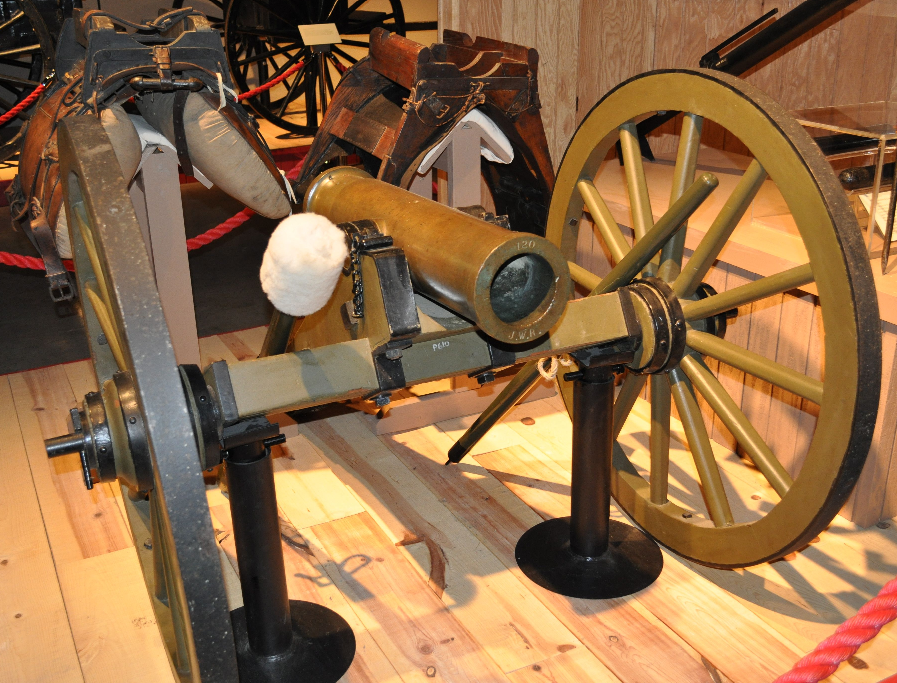
A M1841 12-pounder Mountain Howitzer at the US Army Field Artillery Museum, Fort Sill, OK

One of the organization of Shoups Battery apparently began on September 22, 1862 when Special Order No. 2 directed Col. Jno A. Dunnington, Chief of Ordnance, to turn over to Lieutenant J. C. Shoup the eight mountain howitzers, which were the Little Rock Arsenal, along with full equipment, ammunition etc. The guns were 12-lb mountain howitzers and up to four 2.25" Confederate Mountain Rifles. Only about 24 of the Confederate Mountain Rifles were made by Tredegar Iron Works in Virginia and four of them found their way to Arkansas. By the same order, Lieutenant Shoup was directed to proceed with the battery to Fort Smith Arkansas and there await further orders.

James C. Shoup, was the brother of Francis A. Shoup. He had originally entered Confederate service as a 2nd Sergeant of the Jackson Light Artillery, a.k.a. Thrall's Battery, a.k.a. 3rd Arkansas Light Artillery. He was enlisted September 22, 1861 at Pitman's Ferry, Arkansas by his brother, Major F. A. Shoup for 8 months 23 days. He had been appointed 2nd Lieutenant on July 18, 1861 and assigned as an Assistant Quartermaster. He tendered his resignation on July 16, 1862 as a Senior First Lieutenant of Aucton's Battery to join his brother Major F. A. Shoup in Arkansas.

On September 29, 1862, General Hindman issued Special Order No. 8 from Little Rock which directed F. A. Shoup, now a Colonel, to take charge of the organization of the artillery from North West Arkansas and assigning certain "suitable officers to duty in the company now unorganized, and recommend them for appointment." These suitable officers included Lieutenants Huey [sic] and Miller.

On October 25 Special Order No. 22, Headquarters District of Arkansas, General Hindman Commanding directed Lieutenant J. C. Shoup to proceed to Fort Smith for alterations and repairs of the Mountain Battery. The next day, Special Order No. 23, Shoup's Arkansas Light Battery was assigned to a brigade of Cavalry commanded by Colonel Charles A. Carroll composed of Carroll's regiment of Arkansas Cavalry and Fagan's regiment of Arkansas Cavalry. The brigade Shoup's Battery were ordered to move to Huntsville and take position there, picketing the roads in cooperation with Brigadier General Marmaduke. On Nov 3, 1862, General Hindman issued orders directing Lieutenant Shoup to give four of the mountain pieces to Capt Bledso to enable Bledso to establish a four gun battery made up of Missouri troops. General Hindman also made provision for a sufficient number (120) of artillery horses for the battery to be provided from Texan commands which were being dismounted to create additional infantry units. The organization of the battery was apparently completed by November 8, 1862 when Special Order No. 35, from Camp on the Mulberry River, assigned the following officers to duty in "Shoup's Mountain Battery":

J. C. Shoup Captain.
W. M. Huey(sic) 1st Lieut.
W. A. Miller Jr. 1st Lieut.
G. F. Halliburton 2nd Lieut.

The battery was organized by details from various Arkansas regiments – mostly the 26th and 39th Arkansas Infantry, and 4th Arkansas Cavalry; also a handful of Missouri and Texas details. There are no muster rolls in the Compiled Service Records from Hughey's Battery.

== Service ==
Shoup's Mountain Battery apparently saw its first action on November 28, 1862, during the Battle of Cane Hill, in the opening moves of the Prairie Grove Campaign. Col. Charles A. Carroll took note of the battery's performance in his report of the performance of his Cavalry Brigade during the engagement:

Captain

In compliance with General Orders, No. -, of even date, I have the honor to make the following report of the conduct of the forces of my command in the engagement of the 28th instant;...

Of the mountain howitzer battery attached to my brigade, and commanded by First Lieutenant Hughey, only one section was serviceable... In moving the battery from the first position taken in the morning, the carriage of one of the pieces was so badly broken as to render impossible to moving of it by horses. Notwithstanding the gun thus dismantled was under a galling fire of the enemy's artillery, shells bursting by the minute around it, the cannoneers dismounted, and, under the direction of their officers, bore the piece, crippled but triumphant, to the rear. Just before reaching the second position taken by my brigade, as alluded to in the above report, Captain Shoup, the commander, and Lieutenant Halliburton, of the battery, met me. The captain at once took command of his company. There was now but one serviceable gun of the four-gun battery, which was placed in position frequently during the day with a skill and energy deserving a more substantial battery. After passing some little distance beyond the top of the mountain, this gun was placed in position and opened on the enemy. Notwithstanding the energy with which it was handled, it was dismantled by the enemy's artillery, the carriage being broken to pieces by their heavy shot. This casualty was followed by a cavalry charge made with great energy. The officers, unwilling to leave any trophy in the hands of their country's enemy, took the gun from the shattered carriage and bore this, too, to the rear....

The loss the brigade sustained is as follows: Colonel Monroe's regiment, 3 men slightly wounded, 4 horses killed and 1 wounded; Lieutenant-Colonel Johnston's regiment, 5 men were wounded and 2 men are missing; Captain Shoup's battery, 3 men were wounded and 4 horses killed.

Chas. A. Carroll,

Colonel, Commanding Brigade

The performance of Shoup's battery at Cain Hill also caught the attention of Colonel Joseph O. Shelby:

I noticed also with much pleasure the gallant conduct of Captain Shoup, who commanded his little howitzer well and delivered his fire with great coolness, effect, and precision. With this battery was a brave and fighting driver, who was conspicuous for his daring and the readiness with which he obeyed all orders."

On December 2, 1862, General Hindman issued an order from Fort Smith directing that Shoup's battery along with Bledso's Battery report to Brigadier General John S. Roane's Division. Roane would command the 1st Division of the 1st Corps, Army of the Trans-Mississippi during the Battle of Prairie Grove, Arkansas on December 7, 1862.

Shoup's Battery was composed of ninety eight men, three mountain howitzers, and two (2) 2.25 Inch Rifled mountain howitzers during the Battle of Prairie Grove. Brigadier General Roane's Division was assigned on the Confederate left flank during the battle. While not hotly engaged, General Roane's force screened the left flank of Brigadier General Mosby M. Parsons brigade from Union cavalry. Shoup's battery suffered 1 killed and 2 wounded during the engagement.

== Disbanded ==
In the re-organization of the Army of the Trans-Mississippi following the defeat at Prairie Grove, Shoup's Battery was assigned first to General Carrol's Brigade of Marmaduke's Division and then to Shoup's Division per special Order No. 68, dated December 18, 1862.

Ultimately a decision was made by General Hindman that the mountain howitzers of Shoup's battery were too small to provide effective artillery support. He ordered the guns to be turned over to his Ordnance Officer. As of January 16, 1863, the guns themselves were at Dardanelle awaiting transportation. The battery personnel, which had been made up of men detailed from various infantry units were disbanded, the men sent back to their original commands and the officers relieved of duty.

Brigadier General Francis Shoup moved back across the Mississippi River and served at the Siege of Vicksburg and later during the Siege of Atlanta. James Shoup apparently accompanied his brother on the move back east to become his aide.

By March 1863, First Lieutenant William M. Hughey and Second Lieutenant W. A. Miller would help organize a new battery, the 8th Arkansas Field Battery, which would serve in the Department of the Trans-Mississippi until the close of the war.

== See also ==
- List of Confederate units from Arkansas
- Confederate Units by State
