= Edward Higgins (Confederate general) =

American brigadier general (c.1821–1875)

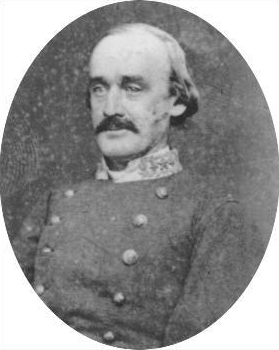
- Brig. Gen. Edward Higgins
- Born: c. 1821; Norfolk, Virginia
- Died: January 31, 1875 (aged c. 53); San Francisco, California
- Burial place: Colma, California
- Military career
- Allegiance: United States of America; Confederate States of America
- Branch: United States Navy; Confederate States Army
- Service years: 1836–1854 (USN); 1861–1865 (CSA)
- Rank: Lieutenant (USN); Brigadier General (CSA)
- Commands: 21st Louisiana Infantry Regiment; Higgins' Brigade
- Conflicts: Mexican-American War; American Civil War

Edward Higgins (c. 1821 – January 31, 1875) was a Confederate States Army brigadier general during the American Civil War. Before the war, he spent almost 20 years in the United States Navy and 7 years as a merchant steamship agent. After the war, he was an insurance and import sales agent at Norfolk, Virginia and from 1872 to 1875 was an agent for the Pacific Mail Steamship Company.

== Early life ==
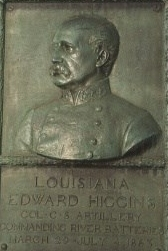
Col. Edward Higgins, bronze relief portrait by T. A. R. Kitson at Vicksburg National Military Park, erected in 1915

Edward Higgins was born in 1821 in Norfolk, Virginia. At a young age, he moved to Louisiana and lived with an uncle. He was appointed a midshipman in the U.S. Navy on January 23, 1836. He was promoted to passed midshipman on July 1, 1842, to master on May 30, 1849, and to lieutenant on August 24, 1849. Higgins also served in the Mexican-American War. He resigned from the U.S. Navy in 1854 and became a steamship agent in the mail service between New York City and New Orleans, Louisiana.

== American Civil War ==
Edward Higgins entered the Confederate States Army on April 12, 1861, as a captain in the 1st Louisiana Artillery Regiment. On June 12, 1861, he became aide-de-camp to Major General David E. Twiggs. Higgins supervised the construction of the defenses of Ship Island. On October 29, 1861, he was appointed captain in the CSA 1st Artillery Regiment.

Higgins resigned from this position on January 2, 1862, and on February 13, 1862, he was appointed lieutenant colonel of the 21st Louisiana Infantry Regiment. Higgins was captured on April 28, 1862, while defending Fort Jackson and Fort St. Philip during the Union Army's attack on and occupation of the lower Mississippi River and New Orleans, Louisiana. After a brief imprisonment, Higgins was exchanged on October 16, 1862.

Having been promoted to colonel on September 26, 1862, Higgins was assigned to command of the river batteries at Vicksburg, Mississippi. In December 1862, Higgins fought at the Snyder's Mill defenses in operations in the Vicksburg Campaign. Upon the surrender of Vicksburg on July 4, 1863, Higgins was captured again. He was exchanged on October 13, 1863, and promoted to brigadier general on October 29, 1863.

At the request of Major General Dabney Herndon Maury, who was in charge of the defenses of Mobile, Alabama, Higgins was assigned to command the bay and harbor defenses at Mobile. He commanded a brigade at Mobile for most of the rest of the war. For reasons not clear in the historical record, Higgins was relieved of his duties on February 18, 1865. At the end of the war, he was in Macon, Georgia, awaiting orders. No record of his final capture or parole has been found.

== Aftermath ==
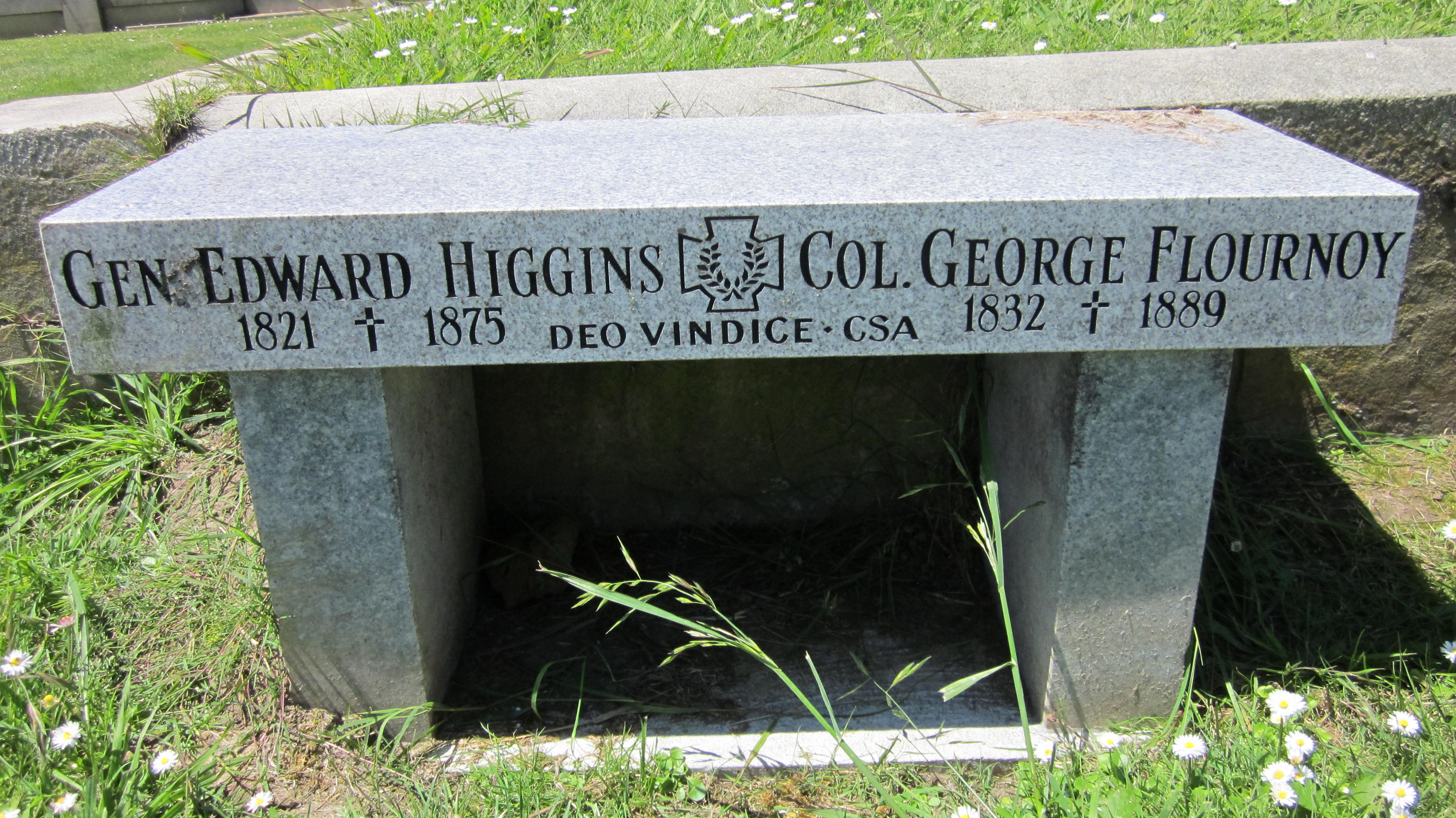
Memorial Bench, Holy Cross Cemetery.

Higgins returned to Norfolk, Virginia, after the end of the war. He was in the insurance and import businesses in Norfolk. After a severe flood in 1872, Higgins moved to California, where he became an agent for the Pacific Mail Steamship Company.

Edward Higgins died January 31, 1875, at San Francisco California. He is buried at Holy Cross Cemetery, Colma, California.

== See also ==
- List of American Civil War generals (Confederate)
