= West Fork School District (Arkansas) =

School district in Arkansas, United States

West Fork School District 141

Location
- 359 School Ave. West Fork, Arkansas 72774 United States

District information
- Grades: preK–12
- Accreditation: ADE
- Schools: 3
- NCES District ID: 0514010

Students and staff
- Students: 1,266 (2010–11)
- Teachers: 86.37 (on FTE basis)
- Staff: 182.37 (on FTE basis)
- Student–teacher ratio: 14.66
- Athletic conference: 3A Region 1 (2012–14)
- Colors: Vegas gold Black

Other information
- Website: sites.google.com/wftigers.org/district/home

West Fork School District 141 is a public school district based in West Fork, Washington County, Arkansas, United States.

== Schools ==
- West Fork Elementary School, serving prekindergarten through grade 4.
- West Fork Middle School, serving grades 5 through 8.
- West Fork High School, serving grades 9 through 12.
