= West Fork High School (Arkansas) =

Location
- 359 School Ave; West Fork, Arkansas; United States; 35°55′17″N 94°11′28″W

Information
- Type: Public secondary
- School district: West Fork School District
- NCES District ID: 0514010
- CEEB code: 042610
- NCES School ID: 050960000702
- Faculty: 30.88 (on FTE basis)
- Grades: 9–12
- Student to teacher ratio: 8.03
- Colors: Vegas gold and black
- Athletics conference: 3A Region 4 (2020-22)
- Mascot: Tiger
- USNWR ranking: No. 23 (AR); No. 2,003 (USA)
- Website: sites.google.com/wftigers.org/wfhs/home?authuser=0

West Fork High School is a secondary school in West Fork, Arkansas, United States. The school is the only secondary school serving grades 9 through 12. It is one of ten public high schools in Washington County and the sole high school administered by the West Fork School District.

== Academics ==
The assumed course of study follows the Smart Core curriculum developed by the Arkansas Department of Education (ADE), which requires students to complete at least 22 units to graduate. Students complete regular (core and career focus) courses and exams and may select Advanced Placement coursework and exams that provide an opportunity for college credit.

In 2012, West Fork was ranked by U.S. News & World Report Best High Schools ranking report as the No. 23 school in the state and No. 2,003 in the nation. The school is accredited by the ADE and has been accredited by AdvancED since 1989.

== Athletics ==
The West Fork High School mascot is the Tiger with Vegas gold and black serving as its school colors.

For 2017, the West Fork Tigers compete in the 4A Region 1 Conference under the administration of the Arkansas Activities Association (AAA). Interscholastic activities include football, basketball, baseball, volleyball, cheer, cross country (boys/girls), golf (boys/girls), softball, and track (boys/girls)
