= Headquarters House (Fayetteville, Arkansas) =

- U.S. National Register of Historic Places
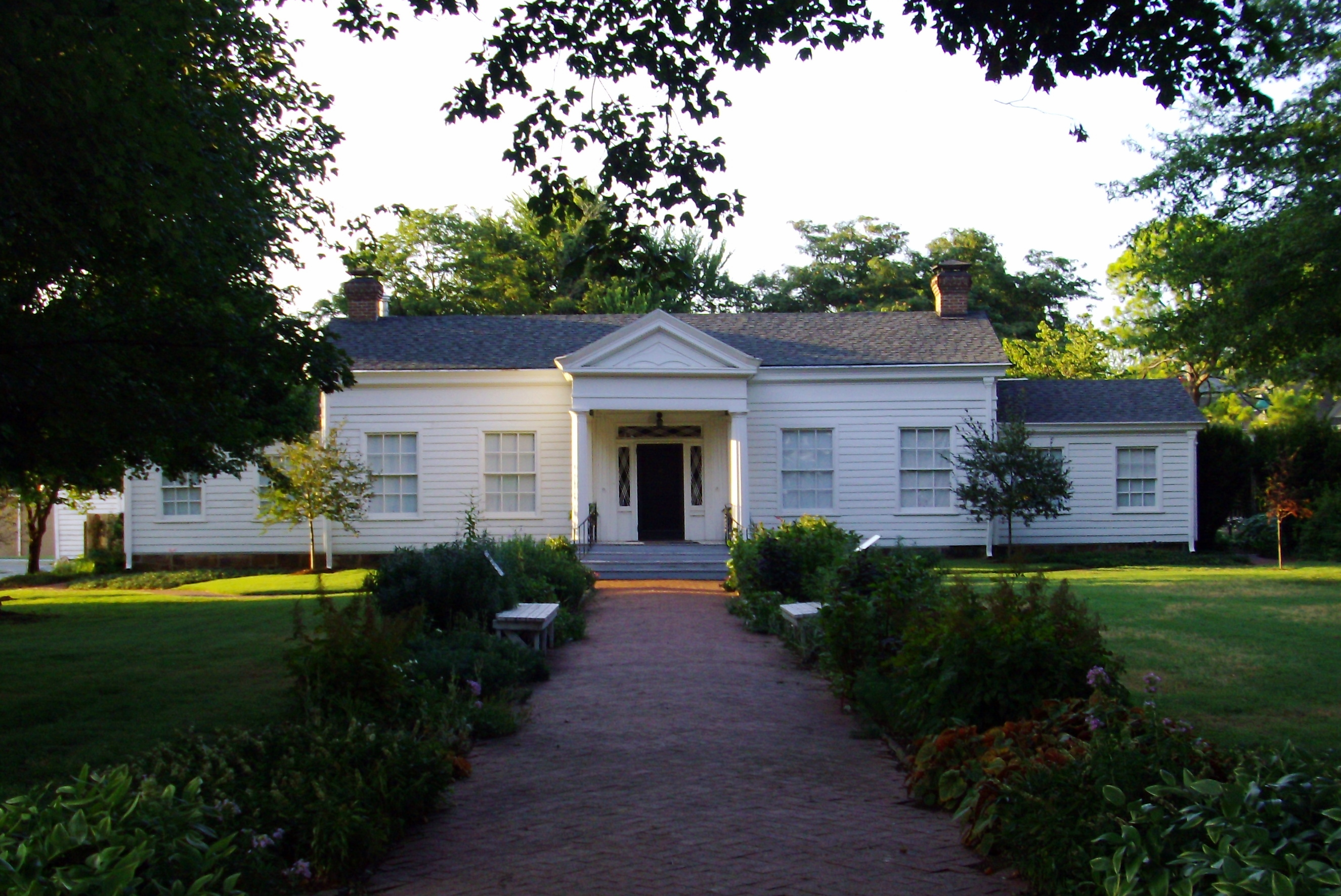
- Headquarters House, August 2011

- Location within Arkansas Location within the United States
- Location: 118 E. Dickson St., Fayetteville, Arkansas
- Coordinates: 36°3′58″N 94°9′4″W
- Area: 0.8 acres (0.32 ha)
- Built: 1850
- Built by: Jonas Tebbetts
- Architect: George Baker
- Architectural style: Greek Revival, Georgian
- NRHP reference No.: 71000129
- Added to NRHP: June 24, 1971

Headquarters House, also known as the Colonel Tebbetts place, is a historic house museum at 118 East Dickson Street in Fayetteville, Arkansas. Built in 1850, during the American Civil War it was a headquarters for both the Union and Confederacy. During the action at Fayetteville the house was attacked by Confederate troops while serving as a Union outpost. The building was donated to the Washington County Historical Society as a museum in 1967 and was placed on the National Register of Historic Places in 1971.

== History ==
The house was constructed by Judge Jonas Tebbetts and his wife in the Greek Revival architectural style and was completed by 1853. Tebbetts was an outspoken supporter of the Union who was arrested in March 1862 and taken to Fort Smith by Confederate General Benjamin McCulloch. Tebbetts was released at the time of McCulloch's death which occurred during the Battle of Pea Ridge. Tebbetts fled to Fayetteville where he learned of a reward offered for him. He and his family quickly evacuated to Missouri permanently leaving their home. After the Tebbetts house was abandoned, the Union Army took it over and used it for their Headquarters.

== Action at Fayetteville ==
The Headquarters House was the intended target of a Confederate attack on April 18, 1863. Union forces were using the house as a base for their northwest Arkansas operations. With a successful capture of the Headquarters House the Rebels could sweep the Union from northwest Arkansas.

The Rebels attacked at 6:00 am in east Fayetteville, drawing fire while artillery climbed East Mountain and fired into the city. One cannonball struck the front door of the Headquarters House, and the house sustained substantial damage throughout the battle. The Union rallied and began to push the Confederates out of Fayetteville later in the morning. Despite a desperate charge up Dickson Street, the Confederates finally decided they could not take the Headquarters House and withdrew. The door and cannonball remain and are now displayed within the museum.

== Architecture ==
The Headquarters House exhibits many key characteristics of Greek Revival architecture. The porch's fluted columns and dentil trimmed eaves are common in similar structures. The parlor fireplace is also typical of Greek Revival style.

== See also ==
- Action at Fayetteville
- National Register of Historic Places listings in Washington County, Arkansas
