= Battle of Devil's Backbone =

1863 battle of the American Civil War

- Part of the American Civil War
Date	September 1, 1863 (162 years ago)
Location	Sebastian County, Arkansas 35°10′42.6″N 94°18′38.16″W
Result	Union victory

Belligerents
United States	Confederate States

Commanders and leaders
(United States) Col. William F. Cloud	(Confederate States of America) Brig. Gen. William L. Cabell

Units involved
2nd Kansas Cavalry Regiment; 6th Missouri Cavalry Regiment; 2nd Indiana Light Artillery Battery	1st Arkansas Cavalry Regiment; 6th Arkansas Cavalry Regiment

Strength
1,500	1,250

Casualties and losses
16	65
- Location within Arkansas

The Battle of Devil's Backbone, also known as the Action at Devil's Backbone, was a military engagement in the Trans-Mississippi Theater of the American Civil War. Devil's Backbone is a ridge in the Ouachita Mountains approximately 4 miles (6.4 km) southwest of Greenwood, Arkansas. The battle was fought on September 1, 1863, in Sebastian County, Arkansas. The Union victory ensured the safety of the Fort Smith garrison until the end of the war.

== Background ==
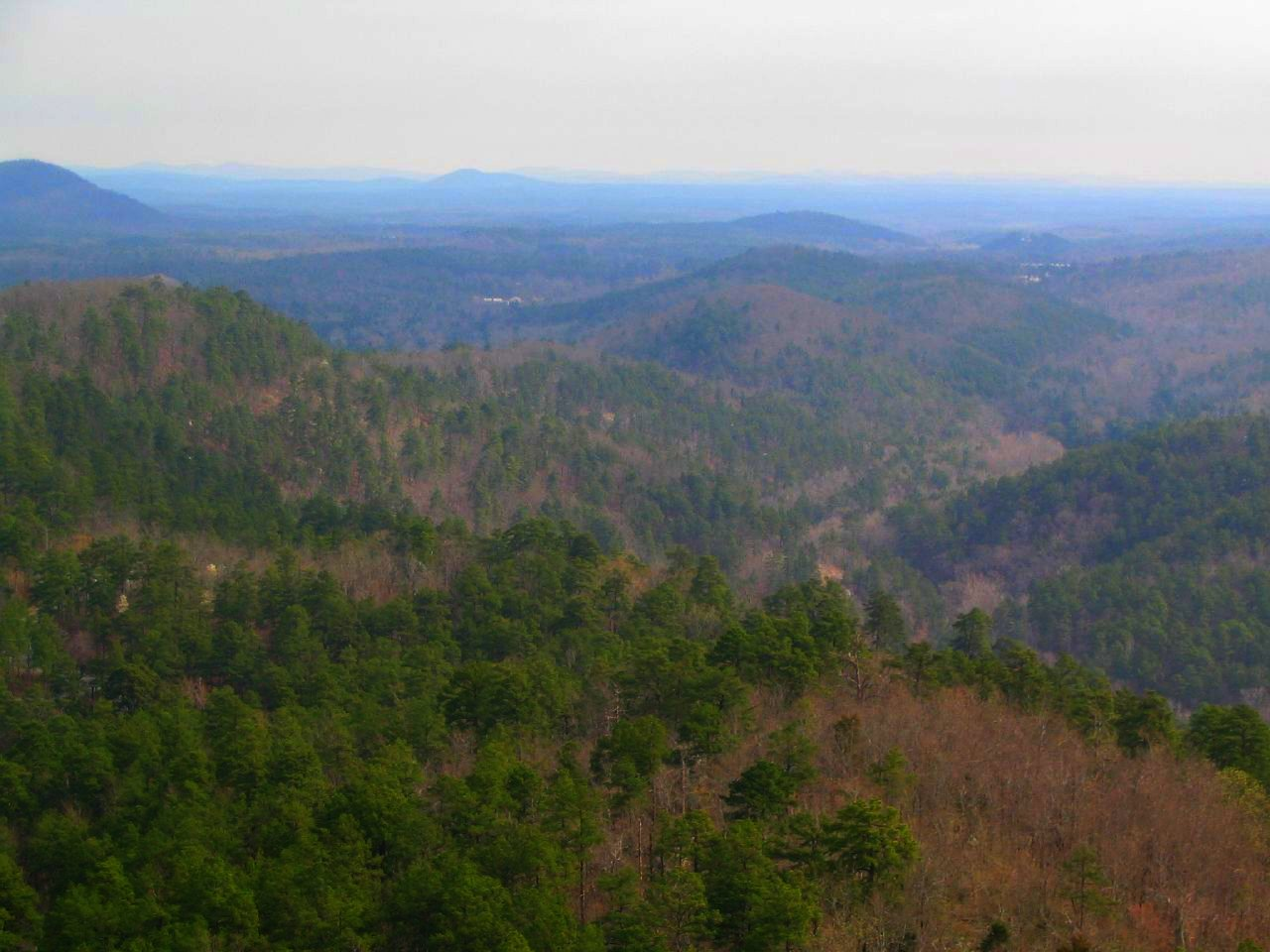
The Battle of Devil's Backbone was fought near here in 1863.

After driving other Confederate forces farther south into Indian Territory in late August 1863, Union Major General James G. Blunt rapidly turned toward Fort Smith. Blunt's troops skirmished with Confederate Brigadier General William L. Cabell's brigade southwest of Fort Smith on August 31. Cabell decided to retreat southeast and sent his baggage and ordnance wagons off that evening. Discovering this Confederate retreat the next morning, Blunt took an infantry regiment and captured Fort Smith without incident, while Colonel William F. Cloud led about 1,500 Union cavalry and artillery men in pursuit of Cabell.

After retreating down the road toward Waldron, Arkansas in Scott County, Cabell turned around to buy time for his slow-moving wagons to escape. His total force numbered 1,250, but probably not all participated in the ensuing action. Morale was a problem; some of Cabell's troops were described as deserters, conscripts, and jayhawkers, with little interest in the Confederate cause. Cabell concealed a reliable cavalry regiment at the base of Devil's Backbone, a ridge crossed by the road. Three unreliable cavalry units were stationed on the hillside beside the road, with an artillery battery and an infantry regiment posted a few hundred yards up the slope behind the cavalry.

== Battle ==
At noon, Cabell drew first blood when Cloud's advance guard blundered into the concealed cavalry regiment's ambush. The advance guard's survivors fell back in confusion as the Confederate battery began firing on the rest of Cloud's arriving command. The Union troops deployed their artillery across the road; it went into action as Cloud's cavalrymen dismounted, formed to either side of the road, advanced to the base of the ridge, and began to ascend the slope. The concealed Confederate cavalry regiment retired before this advance even though Cloud's troops had not yet opened fire.

At this point, Cabell's other units demonstrated their unreliability. An officer with Cabell's infantry regiment recalled, "As the Yankees came in musket range of Cabell's leading regiment, it stampeded without firing a shot and running into and through the two regiments in its rear, stampeded them and the whole combined mass ran through the left wing of Cabell's infantry regiment and swept them off the field." In an instant, Cabell's force was reduced to one cavalry regiment, the battery, and part of the infantry regiment.

Cloud pushed his dismounted cavalrymen to within a quarter of a mile of the Confederate line on the ridge's summit. The action degenerated into a small-arms and artillery skirmish of three hours. Cabell directed the fire of the Confederate battery as Cloud's men made occasional demonstrations of attacking, but no attack materialized; the parties were content to trade fire without close combat.

== Aftermath ==
When the action ended, both sides claimed victory. Cloud reported that the Confederates suddenly retreated during a suspension of Union gunfire. Cabell may have misinterpreted this suspension, because he reported that Cloud was repulsed and that the Confederates then withdrew. In any event, the Union held the field at the action's conclusion. All contact ceased with Cabell's withdrawal. He reached Waldron the next day, and Cloud returned to Fort Smith.

By capturing Fort Smith and defeating Cabell at Devil's Backbone, the Federal forces gained a foothold in the Arkansas River Valley. From this base, Federal units would battle Confederate partisans, march to participate in the April 1864 Camden Expedition, and support Federal efforts in Indian Territory. While the later Battle of Massard Prairie in July 1864 demonstrated Fort Smith's vulnerability, it nonetheless remained a U.S. garrison for the rest of the war.

== Battlefield preservation ==
The American Battlefield Trust and its partners have saved more than 10 acres of the Devil's Backbone Battlefield as of mid-2023.

== See also ==
- List of American Civil War battles
- Troop engagements of the American Civil War, 1863
