= 6th Arkansas Cavalry Regiment =

Cavalry regiment of the Confederate States Army

- Active: 1862–1865
- Disbanded: May 26, 1865
- Country: Confederate States
- Allegiance: Arkansas
- Branch: Confederate States Army
- Type: Cavalry
- Size: Regiment
- Part of: Cabell's Brigade
- Nicknames: "Fagan's regiment"; "Monroe's regiment"
- Facings: Yellow
- Engagements: American Civil War; Battle of Cane Hill; Battle of Prairie Grove; Battle of Fayetteville; Battle of Devil's Backbone; Battle of Pine Bluff; Battle of Elkin's Ferry; Battle of Poison Spring; Battle of Marks' Mills; Battle of Fort Davidson; Battle of Little Blue River; Battle of Independence; Battle of Westport; Battle of Marais des Cygnes; Battle of Mine Creek; Battle of Marmiton River; Battle of Newtonia

Commanders
- Commanding officers: Col. James F. Fagan; Col. James C. Monroe

The 6th Arkansas Cavalry Regiment or the 1st Trans-Mississippi Cavalry Regiment (also known as "Fagan's regiment" or "Monroe's regiment") was a cavalry formation of the Confederate States Army in the Trans-Mississippi Theater of the American Civil War. It was successively commanded by Colonels James F. Fagan and James C. Monroe.

== See also ==
- List of Confederate units from Arkansas
