= West Fork, Arkansas =

- City
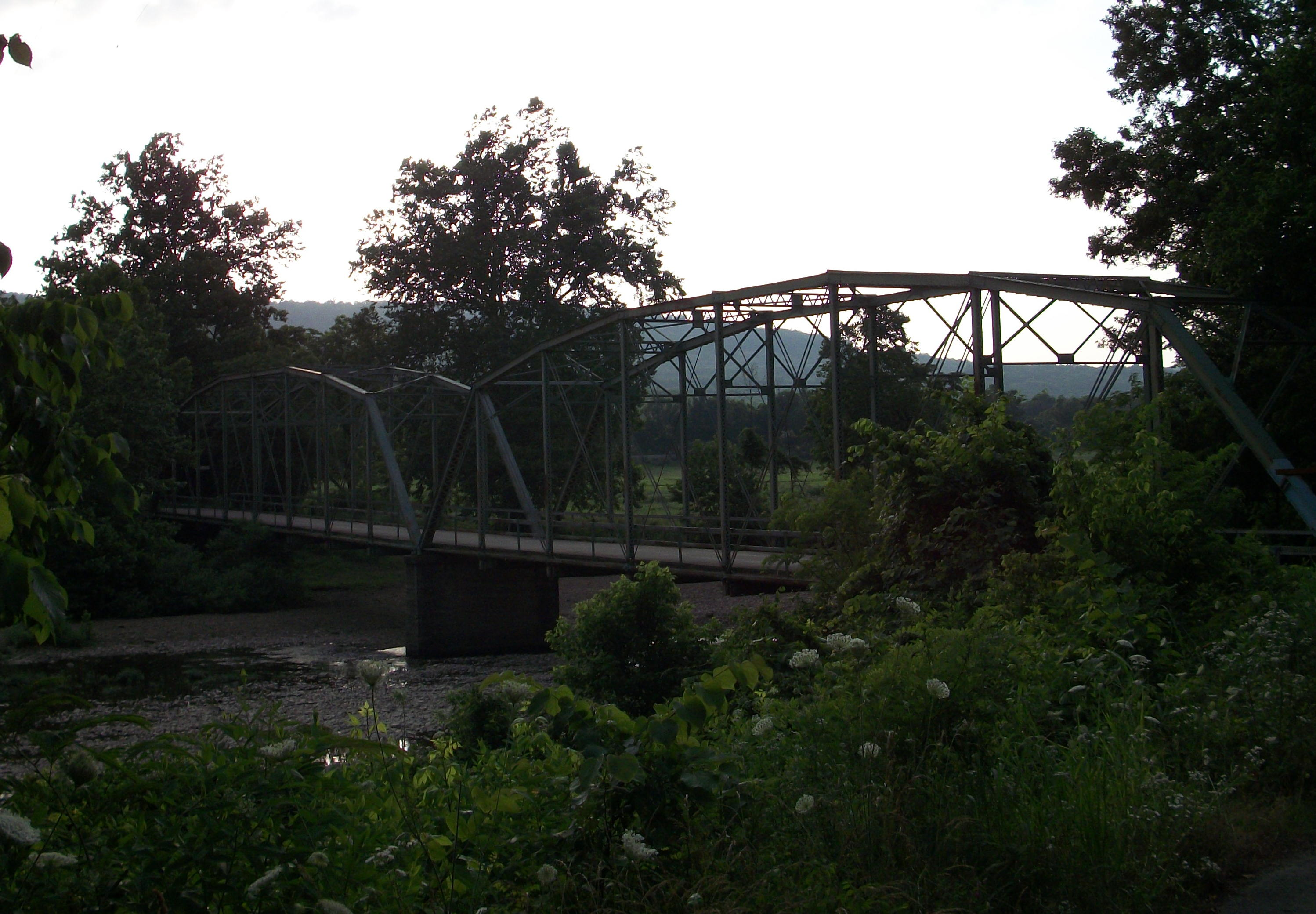
- Historic Woolsey Bridge over the West Fork, White River
- Motto: "Where the best begins!"
- Location of West Fork in Washington County, Arkansas.
- Coordinates: 35°56′08″N 94°10′48″W
- Country: United States
- State: Arkansas
- County: Washington
- Founded: 1848
- Incorporated: May 18, 1885

Area
  - Total: 3.73 sq mi (9.67 km^{2})
  - Land: 3.67 sq mi (9.50 km^{2})
  - Water: 0.066 sq mi (0.17 km^{2})
- Elevation: 1,362 ft (415 m)

Population (2020)
  - Total: 2,331
  - Estimate (2025): 2,373 ▲
  - Density: 635.8/sq mi (245.47/km^{2})
- Time zone: UTC-6 (Central (CST))
  - Summer (DST): UTC-5 (CDT)
- ZIP code: 72774
- Area code: 479
- FIPS code: 05-74360
- GNIS feature ID: 2405707
- Website: www.westforkar.gov

West Fork is a city in Washington County, Arkansas, United States. The population is 2,331 at the 2020 census. It is part of the Northwest Arkansas region.

== History ==
West Fork was incorporated as a city in 1885.

== Geography ==
According to the United States Census Bureau, the city has a total area of 3.3 square miles (8.5 km^{2}), all land.

== Demographics ==
Historical population
Census	Pop.	Note	%±
1930	343		—
1940	392		14.3%
1950	359		−8.4%
1960	350		−2.5%
1970	919		162.6%
1980	1,526		66.1%
1990	1,607		5.3%
2000	2,042		27.1%
2010	2,317		13.5%
2020	2,331		0.6%
2025 (est.)	2,373	▲	1.8%
Encyclopedia of Arkansas; History and Culture

=== 2020 census ===
As of the 2020 census, West Fork had a population of 2,331. The median age was 40.4 years. 23.6% of residents were under the age of 18 and 17.0% of residents were 65 years of age or older. For every 100 females there were 98.0 males, and for every 100 females age 18 and over there were 96.3 males age 18 and over.

0.0% of residents lived in urban areas, while 100.0% lived in rural areas.

There were 927 households in West Fork, of which 34.6% had children under the age of 18 living in them. Of all households, 52.5% were married-couple households, 16.7% were households with a male householder and no spouse or partner present, and 23.0% were households with a female householder and no spouse or partner present. About 21.6% of all households were made up of individuals and 9.3% had someone living alone who was 65 years of age or older.

There were 985 housing units, of which 5.9% were vacant. The homeowner vacancy rate was 2.6% and the rental vacancy rate was 2.7%.

Racial composition as of the 2020 census
Race	Number	Percent
White	2,018	86.6%
Black or African American	9	0.4%
American Indian and Alaska Native	39	1.7%
Asian	14	0.6%
Native Hawaiian and Other Pacific Islander	4	0.2%
Some other race	43	1.8%
Two or more races	204	8.8%
Hispanic or Latino (of any race)	118	5.1%

=== 2000 census ===
As of the census of 2000, there were 2,042 people, 750 households, and 600 families residing in the city. The population density was 612.8 inhabitants per square mile (236.6/km^{2}). There were 800 housing units at an average density of 240.1 per square mile (92.7/km^{2}). The racial makeup of the city was 94.56% White or European American, 0.44% Black or African American, 0.93% Native American, 0.54% Asian, 1.71% from other races, and 1.81% from two or more races. 3.13% of the population were Hispanic or Latino of any race.

There were 750 households, out of which 41.2% had children under the age of 18 living with them, 63.3% were married couples living together, 12.1% had a female householder with no husband present, and 19.9% were non-families. 16.4% of all households were made up of individuals, and 7.6% had someone living alone who was 65 years of age or older. The average household size was 3.72 and the average family size was 4.04.

In the city, the population was spread out, with 30.0% under the age of 18, 8.1% from 18 to 24, 30.2% from 25 to 44, 21.8% from 45 to 64, and 9.8% who were 65 years of age or older. The median age was 33 years. For every 100 females, there were 96.9 males. For every 100 females age 18 and over, there were 92.1 males.

Economically one of the poorer regions of the Northwest Arkansas region, the median income for a household in the city was $31,356, and the median income for a family was $34,818. Males had a median income of $28,037 versus $20,091 for females. The per capita income for the city was $14,976. About 34.6% of families and 25.8% of the population were below the poverty line, including 28.3% of those under age 18 and 19.7% of those age 65 or over.

== Parks and recreation ==
The west fork of the White River flows through the east side of the town. The town sits on the West Fork of the White River, hence the name. Alongside the river is Riverside Park, a common spot for recreational activities such as parties and reunions. The park features playground equipment, several pavilions, many benches, and a walking path. The town is flanked by mountains on both the east and west with Bloyd Mountain on the east has an elevation of 2,020 feet (620 m).

== Education ==
West Fork Public Schools serves the city, and includes:

- West Fork Elementary
- West Fork Middle School
- West Fork High School

All of the West Fork schools are co-located on School Avenue, west of the White River. West Fork's official school mascot is a tiger.

== Media ==
West Fork is the home of the Washington County Observer newspaper.

== Transportation ==
As of 2023, there is no fixed route transit service in West Fork. Ozark Regional Transit operates demand-response service in the city. The nearest intercity bus service is provided by Jefferson Lines in nearby Fayetteville.

== Notable people ==
- Bubba Carpenter, Professional baseball player
- Mildred Earp, professional women's baseball player

== See also ==
- Mineral Springs Community Building
