= List of places in Arkansas: W =

Arkansas State Seal

This list of current cities, towns, unincorporated communities, and other recognized places in the U.S. state of Arkansas whose name begins with the letter W. It also includes information on the number and names of counties in which the place lies, and its lower and upper zip code bounds, if applicable.

== Cities and Towns ==
Name of place	Number of counties	Principal county	Lower zip code	Upper zip code
Wabash	1	Phillips County	72389	
Wabbaseka	1	Jefferson County	72175	
Wade	1	Sevier County		
Wagnon	1	Bradley County		
Wakefield Village	1	Pulaski County		
Walcott	1	Greene County	72474	
Waldenburg	1	Poinsett County	72475	
Waldo	1	Columbia County	71770	
Waldron	1	Scott County	72958	
Walker	1	Columbia County	71753	
Walker	1	White County	72143	
Walkers Creek	1	Lafayette County	71861	
Walkerville	1	Columbia County	71740	
Wallace	1	Ashley County		
Wallace	1	Little River County	71836	
Wallaceburg	1	Hempstead County		
Walnut	1	Newton County	72854	
Walnut Corner	1	Greene County	72416	
Walnut Corner	1	Phillips County	72312	
Walnut Grove	1	Clay County	72422	
Walnut Grove	1	Columbia County		
Walnut Grove	1	Independence County	72524	
Walnut Grove	1	Little River County	71822	
Walnut Grove	1	Poinsett County	72472	
Walnut Grove	1	Van Buren County	72031	
Walnut Grove	1	Washington County	72730	
Walnut Grove	1	Yell County	72842	
Walnut Grove Corner	1	Poinsett County		
Walnut Hill	1	Lafayette County	71826	
Walnut Ridge	1	Grant County		
Walnut Ridge	1	Lawrence County	72476	
Walnut Springs	1	Sevier County	71842	
Walport	1	Lawrence County		
Walters	1	Mississippi County	72438	
Walton Heights	1	Pulaski County		
Waltreak	1	Yell County	72833	
Wampler Spur	1	Jefferson County	71601	
Wampoo	1	Pulaski County	72046	
Warbritton	1	Jefferson County		
Ward	1	Lonoke County	72176	
Ward	1	Pulaski County		
Wardell	1	Mississippi County	72350	
Ware	1	Columbia County		
War Eagle	1	Benton County		
Warm Springs	1	Randolph County	72478	
Warner	1	Ouachita County	71701	
Warnock Springs	1	Columbia County		
Warren	1	Bradley County	71671	
Warsaw	1	Pulaski County		
Washburn	1	Sebastian County	72936	
Washington	1	Hempstead County	71862	
Washita	1	Montgomery County		
Watalula	1	Franklin County	72949	
Waterloo	1	Nevada County	71858	
Watkins	1	White County	72143	
Watkins Corner	1	Phillips County	72366	
Watson	1	Calhoun County		
Watson	1	Desha County	71674	
Watson Chapel	1	Jefferson County	71601	
Wattensaw	1	Lonoke County	72086	
Watts	1	Searcy County		
Wave	1	Dallas County		
Waveland	1	Yell County	72867	
Waverly	1	Crittenden County		
Wayton	1	Newton County	72628	
Weathers	1	Madison County	72742	
Webb City	1	Franklin County	72949	
Weber	1	Arkansas County		
Weddington	1	Washington County		
Wedington	1	Washington County	72701	
Weeks	1	Bradley County		
Weeks	1	Scott County	72958	
Weiner	1	Poinsett County	72479	
Welcome	1	Columbia County	71861	
Welcome	1	Pope County		
Weldon	1	Jackson County	72177	
Welsh	1	Montgomery County		
Weona	1	Poinsett County	72472	
Weona Junction	1	Poinsett County	72472	
Wesley	1	Madison County	72773	
Wesley Chapel	1	Conway County	72110	
Wesson	1	Union County	71749	
West Acres	1	Pulaski County		
West Bauxite	1	Saline County	72011	
West Camden Heights	1	Ouachita County	71701	
West Cobb	1	Franklin County		
West Crossett	1	Ashley County	71635	
West End	1	Jefferson County	71601	
Western Grove	1	Newton County	72685	
West Fork	1	Washington County	72774	
West Gum Springs	1	Clark County	71923	
West Hartford	1	Sebastian County	72938	
West Helena	1	Phillips County	72390	
West Kennett	1	Clay County		
West Liberty	1	Madison County		
West Line	1	Sevier County	71832	
West Marche	1	Pulaski County	72118	
West Memphis	1	Crittenden County	72301	
Westor	1	Lee County	72360	
West Otis	1	Sevier County	71832	
Westover	1	Mississippi County		
West Pangburn	1	Cleburne County	72067	
West Point	1	Benton County		
West Point	1	White County	72178	
West Richwoods	1	Stone County	72560	
West Ridge	1	Mississippi County	72391	
Westville	1	Crawford County	72956	
Westwood	1	Pulaski County		
Wharton	1	Madison County	72740	
Wheatley	1	St. Francis County	72392	
Wheeler	1	Washington County	72775	
Wheeling	1	Fulton County	72576	
Whelen Springs	1	Clark County	71772	
Whipple	1	Van Buren County	72013	
Whiskerville	1	Lawrence County		
Whisp	1	Mississippi County		
Whispering Springs	1	Cleburne County		
Whistleville	1	Mississippi County	72442	
Whitaker	1	Poinsett County	72432	
White	1	Ashley County	71635	
White Bluff	1	Jefferson County		
Whitecliffs	1	Little River County	71846	
White Cliffs	1	Sevier County		
Whitefield	1	Lincoln County		
White Hall	1	Jefferson County	71602	
Whitehall	1	Lee County	72320	
Whitehall	1	Poinsett County	72432	
Whitehall	1	Yell County		
Whitehead Ford	1	Cleburne County		
Whitener	1	Madison County		
White Oak	1	Franklin County	72949	
White Oak	1	Johnson County		
White Oak Bluff	1	Cleveland County		
Whiterock	1	Franklin County	72947	
White Rock	1	Washington County		
Whitetown	1	Montgomery County	71961	
Whiteville	1	Baxter County	72635	
Whitlow	1	Ashley County		
Whitlow Junction	1	Ashley County		
Whitmore	1	St. Francis County	72394	
Whittington	1	Hot Spring County		
Whitton	1	Mississippi County	72386	
Wickes	1	Polk County	71973	
Wick Mill	1	Cross County		
Wideman	1	Izard County	72585	
Widener	1	St. Francis County	72394	
Wiederkehr Village	1	Franklin County	72821	
Wilbeth	1	Poinsett County		
Wilburn	1	Cleburne County	72179	
Wild Cherry	1	Fulton County	72576	
Wileys Cove	1	Searcy County		
Wilkins	1	Jefferson County		
Wilkins	1	Logan County		
Williams Junction	1	Perry County	72126	
Williamson	1	Sevier County	71842	
Williford	1	Sharp County	72482	
Willis	1	Boone County		
Willisville	1	Nevada County	71864	
Willow	1	Dallas County	72084	
Willow Belle	1	Lonoke County		
Willow Creek	1	Van Buren County	72013	
Wilmar	1	Drew County	71675	
Wilmot	1	Ashley County	71676	
Wilson	1	Mississippi County	72395	
Wilson	1	Pope County	72823	
Wilson Junction	1	Mississippi County		
Wilton	1	Little River County	71865	
Winchester	1	Drew County	71677	
Windamere	1	Pulaski County		
Winesburg	1	Craighead County	72401	
Winfield	1	Scott County	72958	
Winfrey	1	Crawford County	72959	
Wing	1	Yell County	72857	
Winington	1	Boone County		
Winrock	1	Conway County		
Winslow	1	Washington County	72959	
Winston Terrace	1	Pulaski County	72204	
Winthrop	1	Little River County	71866	
Wirth	1	Sharp County	72554	
Wiseman	1	Izard County	72587	
Witcherville	1	Sebastian County	72940	
Witherspoon	1	Hot Spring County	71923	
Witter	1	Madison County	72776	
Wittsburg	1	Cross County	72396	
Witts Spring	1	Searcy County	72686	
Wiville	1	Woodruff County	72101	
Wolf Bayou	1	Cleburne County	72530	
Wolquarry	1	Izard County		
Wonderview	1	Conway County		
Woodberry	1	Calhoun County	71744	
Wooden Hills	1	Boone County		
Woodland	1	Johnson County	72830	
Woodland Corner	1	Mississippi County	72319	
Woodland Heights	1	Pulaski County	72207	
Woodland Hills	1	Fulton County	72542	
Woodrow	1	Cleburne County	72130	
Woodson	1	Pulaski County	72180	
Woodyardville	1	Pulaski County		
Woolsey	1	Washington County	72774	
Woolum	1	Searcy County		
Woolum	1	Van Buren County	72645	
Wooster	1	Faulkner County	72181	
Worden	1	White County	72010	
Worthen	1	Pope County	72858	
Wright	1	Jefferson County	72182	
Wrightland	1	Lee County		
Wrightsville	1	Pulaski County	72183	
Wright Town	1	Crawford County		
Wyanoke	1	Crittenden County		
Wycamp	1	Phillips County	72390	
Wye	1	Perry County	72016	
Wylie Spur	1	Crittenden County		
Wyman	1	Washington County	72701	
Wynne	1	Cross County	72396	
Wyola	1	Washington County	72959	

== Townships ==
Name of place	Number of counties	Principal county	Lower zip code	Upper zip code
Wager Township	1	Benton County		
Waldo Township	1	Columbia County		
Walker Township	1	Faulkner County		
Walker Township	1	Franklin County		
Walker Township	1	White County		
Walker Creek Township	1	Lafayette County		
Wallace Township	1	Benton County		
Wallace Township	1	Franklin County		
Wallace Township	1	Little River County		
Wallace Township	1	Stone County		
Wallaceburg Township	1	Hempstead County		
Walls Township	1	Lonoke County		
Walnut Township	1	Benton County		
Walnut Township	1	Lee County		
Walnut Township	1	Montgomery County		
Walnut Township	1	Newton County		
Walnut Corner Township	1	Greene County		
Walnut Lake Township	1	Desha County		
Wappanocca Township	1	Crittenden County		
Ward Township	1	Johnson County		
Ward Township	1	Lonoke County		
Ward Township	1	Yell County		
War Eagle Township	1	Benton County		
War Eagle Township	1	Madison County		
War Eagle I Township	1	Madison County		
War Eagle II Township	1	Madison County		
Warm Springs Township	1	Randolph County		
Washburn Township	1	Logan County		
Washburn Township	1	Sebastian County		
Washington Township	1	Benton County		
Washington Township	1	Bradley County		
Washington Township	1	Conway County		
Washington Township	1	Fulton County		
Washington Township	1	Grant County		
Washington Township	1	Independence County		
Washington Township	1	Jefferson County	72079	72150
Washington Township	1	Ouachita County		
Washington Township	1	Sevier County		
Washington Township	1	Sharp County		
Washington Township	1	Stone County		
Washington Township	1	Van Buren County		
Washita Township	1	Montgomery County		
Watalula Township	1	Franklin County		
Watensaw Township	1	Prairie County		
Water Creek Township	1	Hempstead County		
Water Creek Township	1	Marion County		
Water Valley Township	1	Randolph County		
Waveland Township	1	Yell County		
Weaver Township	1	Franklin County		
Wedington Township	1	Washington County		
Welborn Township	1	Conway County		
Wells Bayou Township	1	Lincoln County		
Wesson Township	1	Union County		
West Fork Township	1	Washington County		
West Griggs Township	1	Van Buren County		
West Prairie Township	1	Poinsett County		
West Roanoke Township	1	Randolph County		
West Sullivan Township	1	Sharp County		
Wharton Township	1	Madison County		
Wharton Creek Township	1	Madison County		
Wheatley Township	1	St. Francis County		
Wheeler Township	1	Van Buren County		
Wheeler Township	1	Washington County		
White Township	1	Ashley County		
White Township	1	Newton County		
White Township	1	Pike County		
White Township	1	Polk County		
White Eagle Township	1	Conway County		
White Oak Township	1	Cleveland County		
White Oak Township	1	Franklin County		
White Oak Township	1	Sebastian County		
White River Township	1	Independence County		
White River Township	1	Izard County		
White River Township	1	Madison County		
White River Township	1	Marion County		
White River Township	1	Prairie County		
White River Township	1	Washington County		
White River Township	1	Woodruff County		
White Rock Township	1	Franklin County		
Whiteville Township	1	Baxter County		
Whiteville Township	1	Cleveland County		
Whiteville Township	1	Jefferson County		
Whitley Township	1	Crawford County		
Whittington Township	1	Garland County		
Whitton Township	1	Mississippi County		
Wilburn Township	1	Cleburne County		
Wild Cherry Township	1	Fulton County		
Wiley Township	1	Randolph County		
Wileys Cove Township	1	Searcy County		
Williams Township	1	Lonoke County		
Willis Township	1	Poinsett County		
Willow Township	1	Dallas County		
Wilmington Township	1	Union County		
Wilmot Township	1	Ashley County		
Wilson Township	1	Clay County		
Wilson Township	1	Faulkner County		
Wilson Township	1	Fulton County		
Wilson Township	1	Pope County		
Wilson Township	1	Stone County		
Wilson Township	1	Yell County		
Winfrey Township	1	Crawford County		
Winona Township	1	Carroll County		
Winslow Township	1	Washington County		
Wittich Township	1	Franklin County		
Wolf Creek Township	1	Pike County		
Womble Township	1	Montgomery County		
Wycough Township	1	Independence County		
Wye Township	1	Perry County		
Wyman Township	1	Washington County		
Wynne Township	1	Cross County		
