= Whitehall (disambiguation) =

Whitehall is a street (and its environs) in central London, which is also used colloquially to refer to the Civil Service.

Whitehall may also refer to:

== In London ==
- Palace of Whitehall, from which the street takes its name, destroyed by fire in 1698
- Whitehall, Cheam, an historic building in the London Borough of Sutton
- Whitehall House, 41 & 43 Whitehall
- Whitehall Theatre, original name of the Trafalgar Theatre, Whitehall

== Houses ==
- Whitehall, one of the Magnificent Seven Houses in Port of Spain, Trinidad and Tobago
- Whitehall Mansion, Stonington, Connecticut
- Flagler Museum or Whitehall, Palm Beach, Florida
- Whitehall House & Gardens, Louisville, Kentucky, a historic house museum in Kentucky
- Whitehall Plantation House (Monroe, Louisiana), a National Register of Historic Places listing in Ouachita Parish, Louisiana
- Whitehall (Annapolis, Maryland)
- Whitehall (Columbus, Mississippi)
- Whitehall (Lincoln, Nebraska)
- Whitehall Terrace, Durham, North Carolina
- Whitehall Farm, Yellow Springs, Ohio
- Whitehall Museum House, Middletown, Rhode Island
- Whitehall (Narragansett, Rhode Island), Narragansett, Rhode Island
- Whitehall (Aiken County, South Carolina)
- Whitehall (Greenville, South Carolina)
- Whitehall (Saluda, South Carolina)
- Whitehall (Clarksville, Tennessee)
- Whitehall (Sutherland Springs, Texas), listed on the NRHP in Wilson County, Texas
- Whitehall, Winestead, in the East Riding of Yorkshire, in England

== Places ==
=== Ireland ===
- Whitehall, Dublin

=== United Kingdom ===
- Whitehall, Bristol
- Whitehall, Hampshire
- Whitehall, Orkney (on Stronsay)

=== United States ===
- Whitehall, Lee County, Arkansas, a place in Arkansas
- Whitehall, Poinsett County, Arkansas
- Whitehall, Yell County, Arkansas, a place in Arkansas
- Whitehall, California, in Mendocino County
- Whitehall, California, former name of White Hall, California, in El Dorado County
- Whitehall, Georgia
- Whitehall, Indiana
- Whitehall, La Salle Parish, Louisiana
- Whitehall, Livingston Parish, Louisiana
- Whitehall, Dorchester County, Maryland, an unincorporated community in Dorchester County
- Whitehall, Michigan, a city
- Whitehall Township, Michigan, in which the city is located
- Whitehall, Montana
- Whitehall, New Jersey
- Whitehall (village), New York
- Whitehall (town), New York
- Whitehall, Ohio
- Whitehall, Adams County, Pennsylvania in Adams County, Pennsylvania
- Whitehall, Allegheny County, Pennsylvania
- Whitehall Township, Pennsylvania
- Whitehall Borough, Pennsylvania, a defunct borough now part of the city of Philadelphia
- Whitehall, Texas, a town in Texas connected by intersections of Texas State Highway 105
- Whitehall, Virginia
- Whitehall, Wisconsin

== Ships ==
- HMS Whitehall (D94), a British destroyer completed in 1924
- USS Whitehall, several naval ships operated by the United States
- Whitehall Rowboat, a type of rowboat named for its original place of manufacture, the end of Whitehall Street in New York City

== Other uses ==
- Whitehall (painting), a 1775 painting by William Marlow
- Whitehall (novel), a 1931 novel by E. V. Timms
- Whitehall State Park, Massachusetts
- Whitehall Street, New York City
- Whitehall Study, a study of stress and health in British civil servants
- Staten Island Ferry Whitehall Terminal
- Whitehall Theatre (Dundee), former theatre in Scotland

== People with the surname ==
- Jack Whitehall (born 1988), British comedian
- Michael Whitehall (born 1940), English television producer, talent agent, television personality, and author
- Raj Whitehall, protagonist of The General series by S. M. Stirling
- Robert Whitehall (1624–1685), English poet
- William Whitehall (1934–2020), American politician

== See also ==
- White Hall (disambiguation)
- White's Hall, the boyhood home of Johns Hopkins
