= Whitehall, Arkansas =

Whitehall, Arkansas may refer to:

- Whitehall, Lee County, Arkansas, a place in Arkansas
- Whitehall, Poinsett County, Arkansas
- Whitehall, Yell County, Arkansas, a place in Arkansas

== See also ==
- White Hall, Arkansas
