= White Rock =

White Rock or White Rocks may refer to:

== Places ==
=== Australia ===
- Wedding Cake Rock, New South Wales
- White Rock Conservation Park, Queensland
- Albino Rock, Queensland, an island formerly known as White Rock
- White Rock River (New South Wales)
- White Rock, Queensland (Cairns Region), a suburb in Cairns, Queensland
- White Rock, Queensland (Ipswich), a suburb in the city of Ipswich, Queensland

=== Canada ===
- White Rock, British Columbia, Canada, a city
- White Rock, Nova Scotia, Canada, an unincorporated community

=== United States ===
- White Rock, Franklin County, Arkansas, an unincorporated community
- White Rock, Washington County, Arkansas, an unincorporated community
- White Rock, California, an unincorporated community
- White Rock, Illinois, an unincorporated community
- White Rock, Kansas, a former settlement
- White Rock, Michigan, an unincorporated community
- White Rock, Minnesota, an unincorporated community
- White Rock, Missouri, an unincorporated community
- White Rock, Nevada, a ghost town
- White Rock, New Mexico, a census-designated place
- White Rock, San Juan County, New Mexico, a Navajo settlement
- White Rock, South Carolina, an unincorporated community
- White Rock, South Dakota, a town
- White Rock, Texas, a town
- White Rock (Taconic Mountains), a ridgeline high point; also White Rocks, the southernmost summit on the same ridgeline
- White Rock Township (disambiguation)
- White Rock Mountains, Nevada
- White Rock Lake, Dallas, Texas
- White Rock Creek, running through Dallas
- White Rock (DART station), Dallas
- White Rocks National Recreation Area, Vermont
- White Rocks Natural Area, a protected area in Boulder County, Colorado
- White Rock (Wyoming), a mountain in the Wind River Range
- White Rock Airport, a defunct airport in Dallas, Texas

=== Elsewhere ===
- White Rocks Complex, Pembroke, Malta
- White Rock River, New Zealand

== Other uses ==
- White Rock (film), a documentary about the 1976 Winter Olympic Games
- White Rock (album), a soundtrack album to the White Rock film
- White Rock Beverages, a company based in Whitestone, New York
- Project White Rock, codename of a cross-platform game that is in development by RedLynx
- White Rock Theatre, Hastings, East Sussex, England
- White Rock Battery, an artillery battery in Gibraltar
- The White Rock: An Exploration of the Inca Heartland, a 2001 travel book by Hugh Thomson
- The White Rock (novel), a 1945 novel by Denys Val Baker
