= White Rock, Arkansas =

White Rock, Arkansas could be one of two places:

- White Rock, Franklin County, Arkansas, an unincorporated community in White Rock Township, Franklin County, Arkansas
- White Rock, Washington County, Arkansas, an unincorporated community
