= White Hall =

White Hall may refer to:

== Geography ==
=== United States ===
- White Hall, Alabama
- White Hall, Arkansas
- White Hall, California
- White Hall Township, Greene County, Illinois
  - White Hall, Illinois
- White Hall, Baltimore County, Maryland
- White Hall, Cecil County, Maryland
- White Hall, Prince George's County, Maryland
- White Hall, Albemarle County, Virginia
- White Hall, Frederick County, Virginia
- White Hall, West Virginia

=== Elsewhere ===
- White Hall, Northern Ireland, a townland in County Antrim
- White Hall, Saint Elizabeth, Jamaica, a settlement

== Buildings ==
=== United States ===
- White Hall (Bear, Delaware), NRHP-listed
- White Hall (Daytona Beach, Florida), NRHP-listed
- White Hall (West Point, Georgia), listed on the NRHP in Harris County, Georgia
- White Hall (Whitehall, Georgia), listed on the NRHP in Clarke County, Georgia
- White Hall (Richmond, Kentucky), NRHP-listed
- White Hall Plantation House, NRHP-listed in Pointe Coupee Parish, Louisiana
- White Hall (Ellicott City, Maryland), NRHP-listed in Howard County
- White Hall (Princess Anne, Maryland), NRHP-listed in Somerset County
- White Hall (Cornell University, Ithaca, New York)
- White Hall (Spring Hill, Tennessee), listed on the NRHP in Maury County, Tennessee
- White Hall (Toano, Virginia), NRHP-listed in James City County
- White Hall (Zanoni, Virginia), NRHP-listed in Gloucester County

=== Elsewhere ===
- White Hall, Winestead, in the East Riding of Yorkshire in England
- "Salón Blanco" (White Hall), a hall at the Casa Rosada, Argentina
- White Hall, one of the Magnificent Seven Houses in Trinidad and Tobago, is the house of the Prime Minister of the Republic of Trinidad and Tobago

== See also ==
- White's Hall
- Whitehall (disambiguation)
