= Whistleville =

Whistleville may refer to the following places in the United States:

- Whistleville, Arkansas
- Whistleville, Georgia
- Whistleville, the site of a ghost town in Macon County, Illinois
