= Coleus habrophyllus =

Conservation status
- Endangered (EPBC Act)

Scientific classification
- Kingdom: Plantae
- Clade: Tracheophytes
- Clade: Angiosperms
- Clade: Eudicots
- Clade: Asterids
- Order: Lamiales
- Family: Lamiaceae
- Genus: Coleus
- Species: C. habrophyllus

Binomial name
- Coleus habrophyllus (P.I.Forst.) P.I.Forst.

Synonyms
- Plectranthus habrophyllus P.I.Forst.

Species of plant

Coleus habrophyllus, synonym Plectranthus habrophyllus, is a woody, square-stemmed herb in the family Lamiaceae. Growing only in South East Queensland, Australia, it is listed as endangered under the Environment Protection and Biodiversity Conservation Act since 16 July 2000.

== Distribution ==
It is known to grow only in seven locations near Ipswich and near Ormeau, south of Beenleigh, Australia.

The seven known populations are:

- Oxley Creek, Greenbank
- Opossum Creek, Springfield
- Woogaroo Creek, Goodna
- Three populations within White Rock Conservation Park, incorporating Six Mile Creek Conservation Park
- Near Ormeau (south of Beenleigh)
