= Whitehall House =

London listed building by Treadwell & Martin

Coordinates: 51.5064°N 0.1269°W

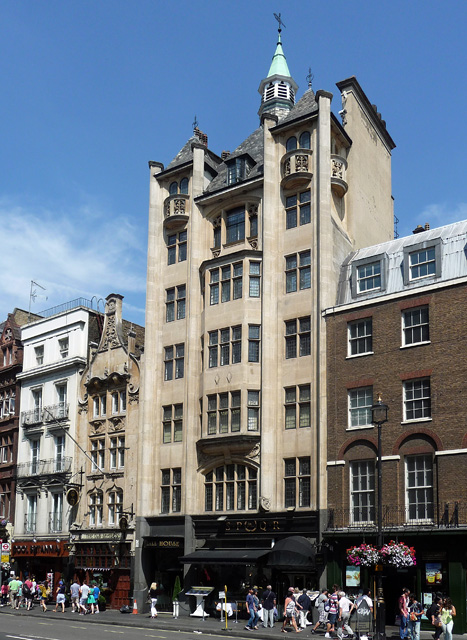
Whitehall House; The Old Shades pub is visible to the left

Whitehall House, 41 and 43 Whitehall, London, is a grade II listed building designed by Treadwell & Martin.
