= The White Rock =

The White Rock may refer to:

- The White Rock: An Exploration of the Inca Heartland , 2001 travel book by Hugh Thomson
- The White Rock (novel), 1945 novel by Denys Val Baker

== See also ==
- White Rock (disambiguation)
