= Whitehall Township =

Whitehall Township may refer to the following places:

- Whitehall Township, Michigan
- Whitehall Township, Pennsylvania

There is also:

- North Whitehall Township, Pennsylvania
- South Whitehall Township, Pennsylvania

See also

- Whitehall (disambiguation)
