= Winfield Township =

Winfield Township may refer to the following places:

- Winfield Township, DuPage County, Illinois
- Winfield Township, Lake County, Indiana
- Winfield Township, Scott County, Iowa
- Winfield Township, Osborne County, Kansas
- Winfield Township, Montcalm County, Michigan
- Winfield Township, Renville County, Minnesota
- Winfield Township, Union County, New Jersey
- Winfield Township, Stutsman County, North Dakota
- Winfield Township, Pennsylvania

See also

- Winfield (disambiguation)
