= Winfield =

Winfield may refer to:

== Places ==
=== Canada ===
- Winfield, Alberta
- Winfield, British Columbia

=== United States ===
- Winfield, Alabama
- Winfield, Arkansas
- Winfield, Georgia
- Winfield, Illinois
  - Winfield station
- Winfield, Indiana
- Winfield, Iowa
- Winfield, Kansas
- Winfield, Maryland (southern Carroll County)
- Winfield, Missouri
- Winfield (town), New York
- Winfield, Pennsylvania
- Winfield, Tennessee
- Winfield, Texas
- Winfield, West Virginia
- Winfield, Wisconsin
- Winfield Township, Michigan
- Winfield Township, Renville County, Minnesota
- Winfield Township, New Jersey
- Winfield Township, Pennsylvania
- West Winfield, New York

== People ==
=== Given name ===
==== Military ====
- Winfield Scott Edgerly (1846–1927), United States Army general
- Winfield Scott Hancock (1824–1886), United States Army general and unsuccessful presidential candidate in 1880
- Winfield Scott Schley (1839-1911), United States Navy admiral
- Winfield Scott (1786–1866), United States Army general and unsuccessful presidential candidate in 1852
- Winfield Scott (chaplain) (1837–1910), United States Army chaplain
- Winfield W. Scott Jr. (1927–2022), United States Air Force general
- Winfield W. Scott III, United States Air Force general

==== Politics ====
- Winfield Dunn, (1927-2024) governor of Tennessee
- Winfield T. Durbin (1847–1928), governor of Indiana
- Winfield Ervin Jr. (1902–1985), mayor of Anchorage
- Winfield Scott Hammond (1863–1915), governor of Minnesota
- Winfield Moses (born 1943), mayor of Fort Wayne
- Winfield M. Kelly Jr. (1935–2023), Maryland politician

==== Other ====
- Winfield Scott Chaplin (1847–1918), American academic administrator
- Winfield Scott Hastings (1847–1907), American baseball player
- Winfield Scott (songwriter) (1920–2015), American musician
- Winfield Townley Scott (1910–1968), American writer
- Winfield Scott Stratton (1848–1902), American capitalist

=== Surname ===
- Adam C. Winfield, American soldier accused of war crimes
- Antoine Winfield Sr. (born 1977), American football player
- Antoine Winfield Jr. (born 1997), American football player, son of Antoine Winfield Sr.
- A. R. Winfield (d. 1887), American Methodist preacher
- Bert Winfield (1878–1919), Welsh international rugby union player
- Charles Winfield, 1830s New York politician
- Charles H. Winfield (1822–1888), US congressman from New York
- Dave Winfield (born 1951), Hall of Fame Baseball player
- Gene Winfield (1927–2025), American automobile customizer
- James E. Winfield (1944–2000) American civil rights lawyer, politician, city prosecutor
- John Winfield (born 1944), English footballer
- Lauren Winfield (born 1990), English cricketer
- Lunch Winfield (born 2004), American football player
- Paul Winfield (1939–2004), American actor
- Percy Henry Winfield, professor of law
- Richard Dien Winfield (born 1950), American philosopher
- Thomas Winfield (born 1963), American politician

== Commerce ==
- Winfield (cigarette), an Australian brand of cigarette produced by British American Tobacco
- Winfield Carburetor Company, Los Angeles based maker of carburetors, owned by Ed Winfield
- Own-brand goods sold by the British retailer, Woolworths

== See also ==
- Winfield House, the residence of the US ambassador to the UK
- Winfield Racing School
- Winnfield, Louisiana
- Wynnefield, Philadelphia
- Winfield Joad, fictional character in novel and film, The Grapes of Wrath
