= Bacon Hotel =

- U.S. National Register of Historic Places
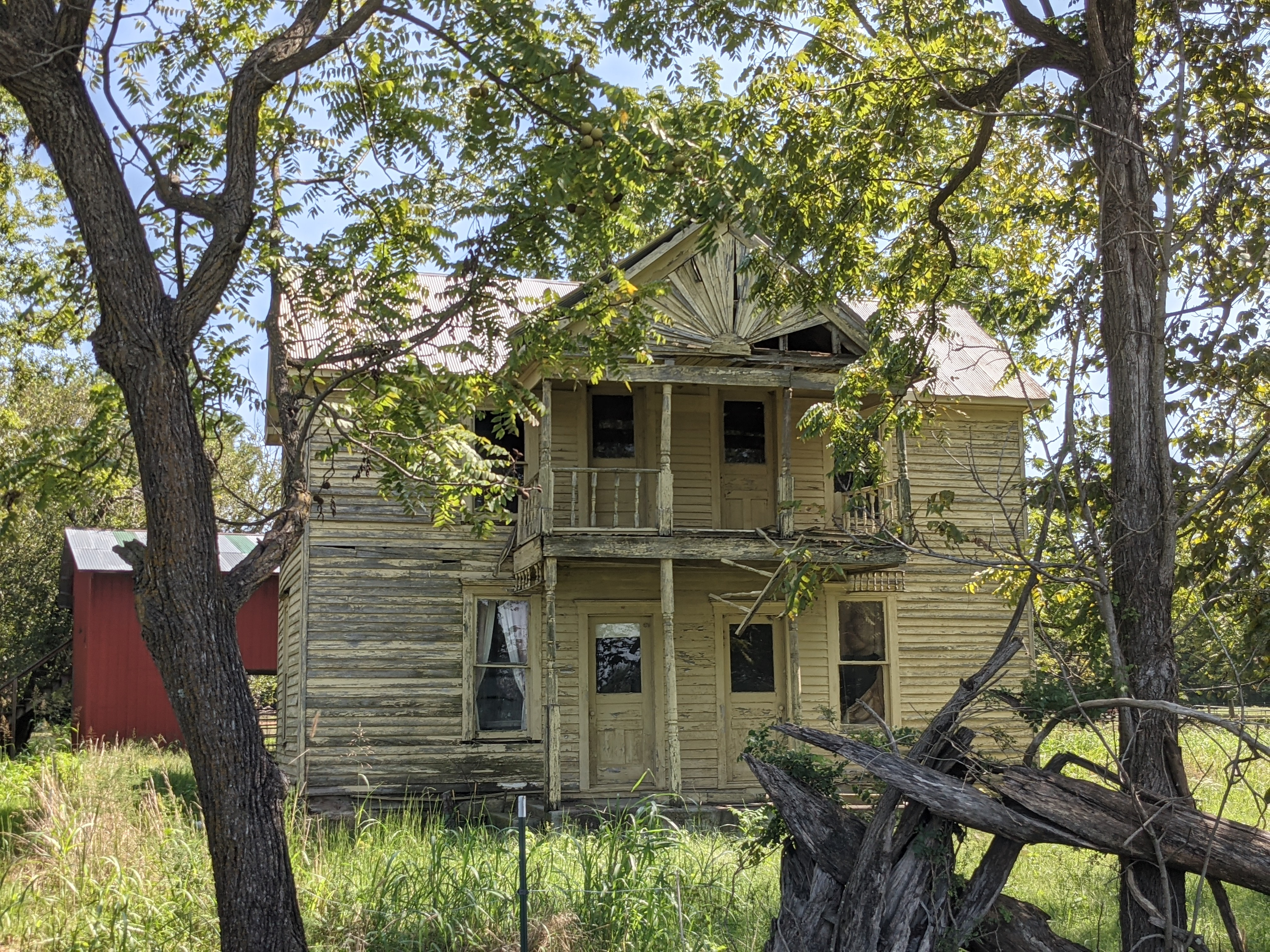

- Location within Arkansas Location within the United States
- Location: Homestead Rd. at jct. with RR tracks, SE corner, Whitehall, Arkansas
- Coordinates: 35°28′48″N 90°44′5″W
- Area: less than one acre
- Architect: James Bacon
- Architectural style: Folk Victorian
- NRHP reference No.: 95001437
- Added to NRHP: December 13, 1995

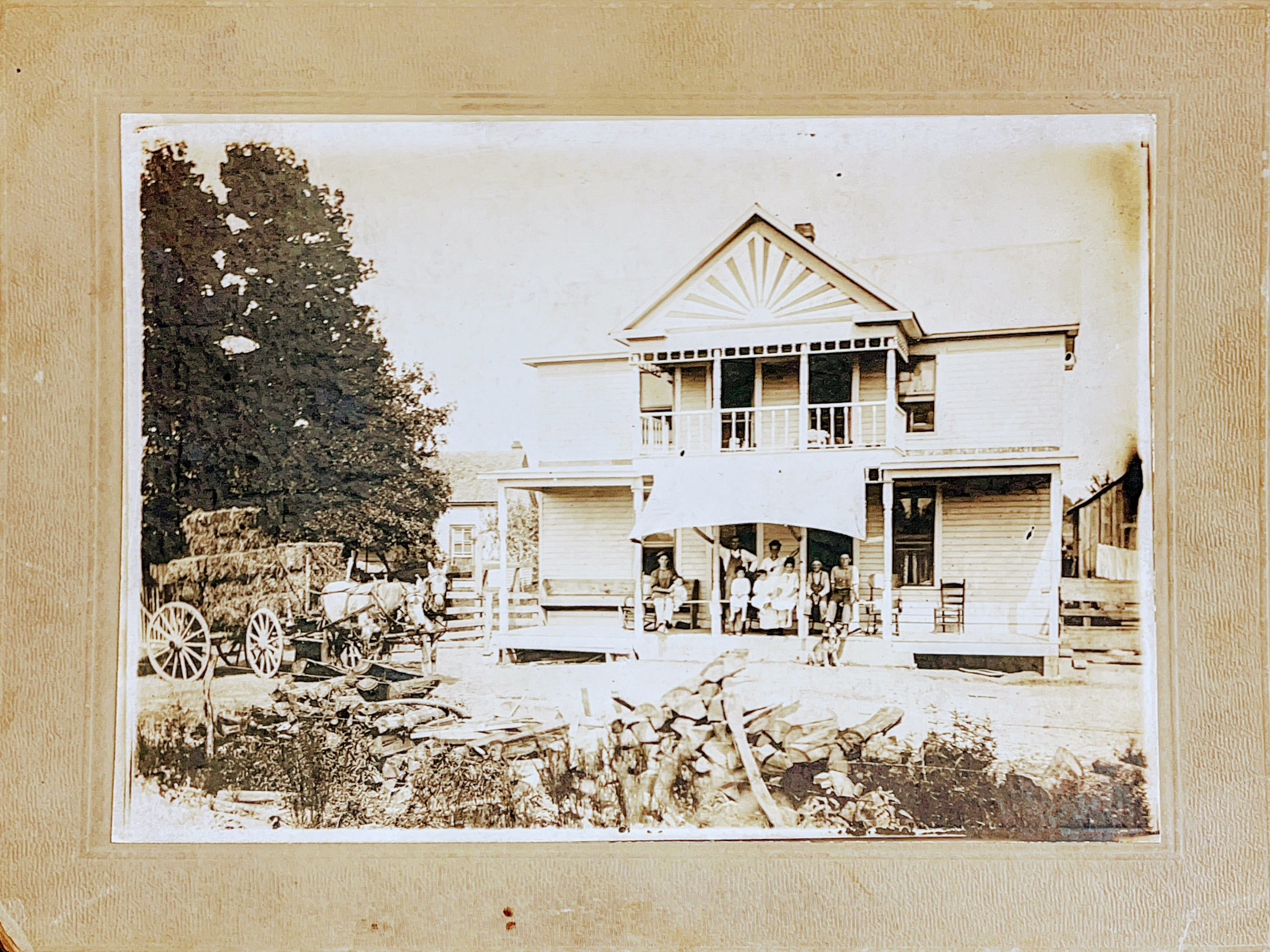

The Bacon Hotel, also known as the Sunrise Hotel, is a historic hotel building at the southeast corner of Railroad and Homestead Roads in Whitehall, Arkansas. It is a two-story wood-frame structure, with a cross-gable roof and a two-story porch extending across its front. The porch is supported by spindled wooden posts, and the front gable end features a large carved sunburst design. There are four guest rooms on each floor; those on the second level are accessed via outside stairs.

The hotel was built by James William Bacon in 1912 to accommodate timber company executives and salesman during the area's timber boom, It is one of the few surviving reminders of that period and cited in the National Registry as one of the state's finer railroad-era Folk Victorian-style hotels.

The building was listed on the National Register of Historic Places in 1995, at which time it had been reported to be functionally vacant since the 1950s.

== See also ==
- National Register of Historic Places listings in Poinsett County, Arkansas
