= Woogaroo Forest =

Forest in Queensland, Australia

Coordinates: 27°38′15″S 152°54′00″E

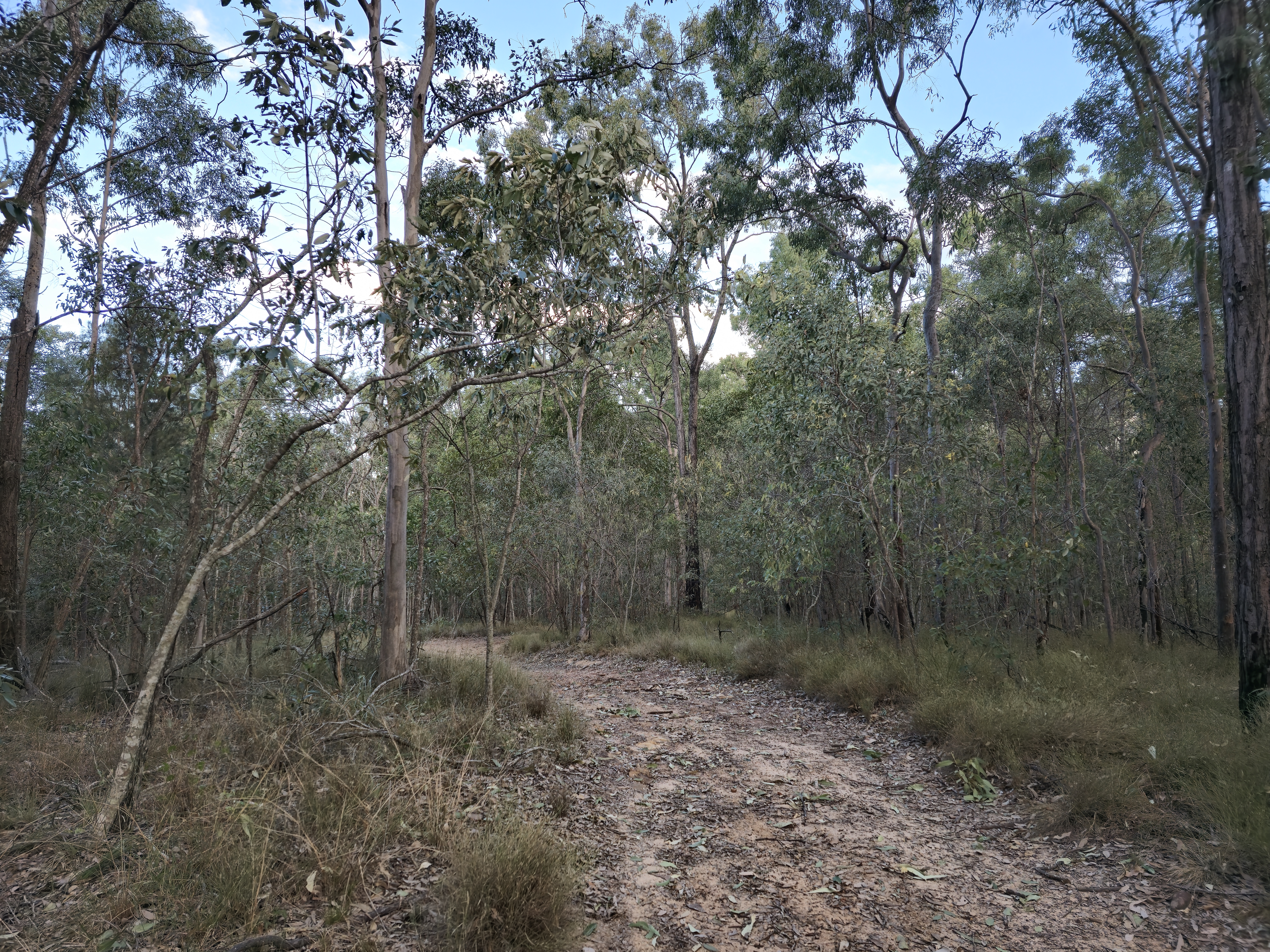
Pathway through the forest

Woogaroo Forest (also known as Woogaroo Scrub or Goodna Scrub) is an area of forest covered land in eastern Ipswich, Queensland, Australia. Woogaroo Forest currently covers over 450 hectares. Although not officially designated as protected bushland, it has been known locally for many years. Written references to Goodna Scrub date back to the early 1890s, when it was a popular destination for early European settlers, botanists and naturalists due to its diverse wildlife.

Woogaroo Forest is located within Six Mile, Woogaroo and Goodna Creeks sub-catchment of the highly urbanised Lower Brisbane River Catchment.

== Fauna ==
A large variety of native Australian animals rely on Woogaroo Forest for habitat. Several species which are listed as 'threatened' in Queensland have been recorded in the area. Of note, this includes koalas, powerful owls, and brush-tailed phascogales. Sugar gliders, platypus, kangaroos, wallabies, frilled lizards, and echidnas have also been recorded there.

== Flora ==
A wide range of native flora have been recorded at Woogaroo Forest. The predominant vegetation types are eucalypt forest and dry rainforest.

Coleus habrophyllus, a highly rare and endangered species of herb, is known to exist only in seven, small populations in South East Queensland and nowhere else in the world. Two of which fall within the boundaries of Woogaroo Forest.

== Campaign for official recognition and protection ==
As of 2024, Woogaroo Forest is threatened by four development proposals. The proposed development site stretches over 320 hectares of native bushland. If approved, this would see 1,800 homes, a commercial centre, childcare centre, and a local sports park built. Additionally, approximately 14 metres would be removed from the ridge lines to flatten the landscape.

A protest in opposition to the proposed development of Woogaroo Forest on 16 June 2024, saw hundreds of people in attendance.
