= McNair, Arkansas =

- Unincorporated community
- McNair's position in Arkansas. McNair, Arkansas (the United States)
- Coordinates: 36°3′1″N 94°10′35″W
- Country: United States
- State: Arkansas
- County: Washington
- Township: Fayetteville
- Elevation: 1,270 ft (387 m)
- Time zone: UTC-6 (Central (CST))
  - Summer (DST): UTC-5 (CDT)
- ZIP code: 72701
- Area code: 479
- GNIS feature ID: 77638

McNair (formerly Vale) is an unincorporated community in Fayetteville Township, Washington County, Arkansas, United States. It is located within Fayetteville in the southwest part of town near Baum Stadium. McNair was primarily the location of the switching board off the main Frisco line to the Ozark and Cherokee Central branch which went to Tahlequah.
