= Rising Sun, Fitzrovia =

Pub in Fitzrovia, London

Coordinates: 51°31′9.2″N 0°7′59.3″W

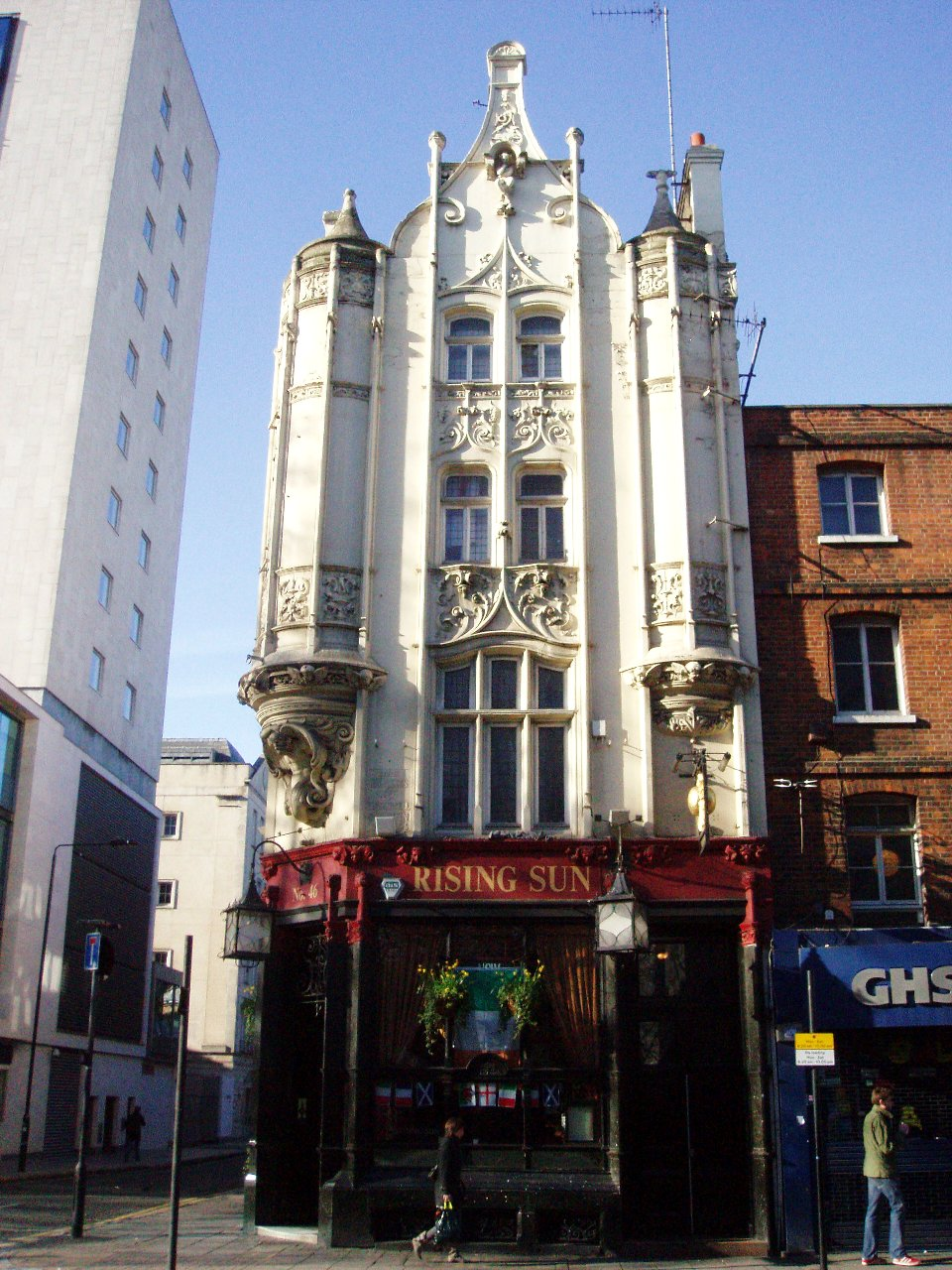
The Rising Sun, Fitzrovia.

The Rising Sun is a public house at 46 Tottenham Court Road, Fitzrovia, London, W1T 2ED, managed by Taylor Walker. It is a Grade II listed building with English Heritage.

The art nouveau Gothic building was designed by Victorian architects Treadwell and Martin. In the early 1980s the pub was renamed "The Presley" and decorated with images of Elvis Presley, the owners lowering the ceiling and destroying the Victorian interior. The pub was renamed The Rising Sun by its next owners.
