= Baldwin, Arkansas =

- Unincorporated community
- Baldwin's position in Arkansas. Baldwin, Arkansas (the United States)
- Coordinates: 36°2′54″N 94°5′49″W
- Country: United States
- State: Arkansas
- County: Washington
- Township: Fayetteville
- Elevation: 1,217 ft (371 m)
- Time zone: UTC-6 (Central (CST))
  - Summer (DST): UTC-5 (CDT)
- ZIP code: 72701
- Area code: 479
- GNIS feature ID: 57317

Baldwin is a former unincorporated community in Fayetteville Township, Washington County, Arkansas, United States. It has since been annexed by Fayetteville. It is located in east Fayetteville along Huntsville Road near Lake Sequoyah toward Elkins.
