= Bear, Delaware =

Census-designated place in Delaware, United States

- CDP
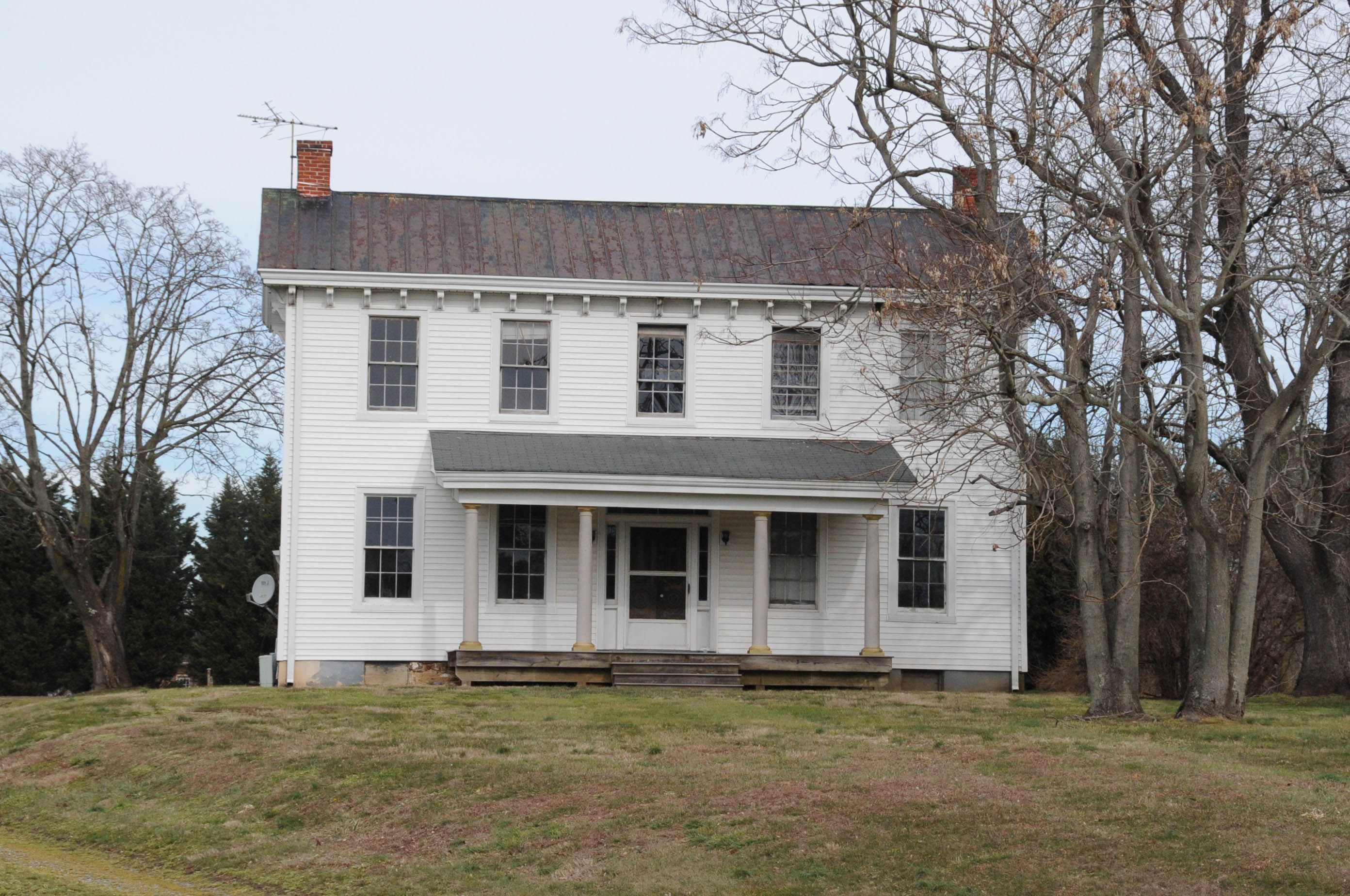
- White Hall

- Location in New Castle County and the state of Delaware.

- Location within the state of Delaware Bear (the United States)
- Coordinates: 39°37′45″N 75°39′30″W
- Country: United States
- State: Delaware
- County: New Castle

Area
  - Total: 5.78 sq mi (14.98 km^{2})
  - Land: 5.78 sq mi (14.98 km^{2})
  - Water: 0 sq mi (0.00 km^{2})
- Elevation: 69 ft (21 m)

Population (2020)
  - Total: 23,060
  - Density: 3,986.6/sq mi (1,539.25/km^{2})
- Time zone: UTC-5 (Eastern (EST))
  - Summer (DST): UTC-4 (EDT)
- ZIP code: 19701
- Area code: 302
- FIPS code: 10-04130
- GNIS feature ID: 216026

Bear is a census-designated place (CDP) in New Castle County, Delaware, United States. As of the 2020 census, Bear had a population of 23,060.

Originally a small crossroads in a rural area, approximately 14 miles (23 km) south of Wilmington, the area supported small farms growing mainly corn and cattle. In the late 1980s and 1990s Bear became a popular location for the construction of sprawling housing developments and shopping centers along U.S. Route 40. Much of Bear runs along the highway, and extends to approximately Delaware Route 896.

== History ==
According to common legend, the name "Bear" originated from a tavern located along the roadway from Wilmington to Dover, Delaware (at the intersection now formed by U.S. Route 40 and Delaware Route 7), whose sign was decorated with the image of a large bear, and which George Washington had reportedly visited.

Bear's population was 50 in 1890, and was 59 in 1900.

In later years, Bear has had a history of being centered around shopping centers and neighborhoods located along U.S. Route 40.

White Hall was listed on the National Register of Historic Places in 1990.

== Geography ==
Bear is located at 39°37′45″N 75°39′30″W (39.6292788, -75.6582628).

According to the United States Census Bureau, the CDP has a total area of 5.7 square miles (15 km^{2}), all land.

Bear is located approximately 14 miles south of Wilmington and about 44 miles from Philadelphia, Pennsylvania.

== Demographics ==
Historical population
Census	Pop.	Note	%±
2000	17,593		—
2010	19,371		10.1%
2020	23,060		19.0%
U.S. Decennial Census

=== Racial and ethnic composition ===
Bear CDP, Delaware – Racial and ethnic composition Note: the US Census treats Hispanic/Latino as an ethnic category. This table excludes Latinos from the racial categories and assigns them to a separate category. Hispanics/Latinos may be of any race.
Race / Ethnicity (NH = Non-Hispanic)	Pop 2000	Pop 2010	Pop 2020	% 2000	% 2010	% 2020
White alone (NH)	11,338	8,741	7,712	64.45%	45.12%	33.44%
Black or African American alone (NH)	4,575	6,507	8,739	26.00%	33.59%	37.90%
Native American or Alaska Native alone (NH)	31	33	40	0.18%	0.17%	0.17%
Asian alone (NH)	329	811	1,516	1.87%	4.19%	6.57%
Native Hawaiian or Pacific Islander alone (NH)	4	5	2	0.02%	0.03%	0.01%
Other race alone (NH)	32	36	120	0.18%	0.19%	0.52%
Mixed race or Multiracial (NH)	316	488	938	1.80%	2.52%	4.07%
Hispanic or Latino (any race)	968	2,750	3,993	5.50%	14.20%	17.32%
Total	17,593	19,371	23,060	100.00%	100.00%	100.00%

=== 2020 census ===
As of the 2020 census, Bear had a population of 23,060. The median age was 36.3 years. 23.3% of residents were under the age of 18 and 13.0% of residents were 65 years of age or older. For every 100 females there were 89.3 males, and for every 100 females age 18 and over there were 84.9 males age 18 and over.

100.0% of residents lived in urban areas, while 0.0% lived in rural areas.

There were 8,544 households in Bear, of which 33.4% had children under the age of 18 living in them. Of all households, 42.8% were married-couple households, 16.9% were households with a male householder and no spouse or partner present, and 32.6% were households with a female householder and no spouse or partner present. About 24.2% of all households were made up of individuals and 8.1% had someone living alone who was 65 years of age or older.

There were 9,072 housing units, of which 5.8% were vacant. The homeowner vacancy rate was 1.2% and the rental vacancy rate was 7.8%.

Racial composition as of the 2020 census
Race	Number	Percent
White	8,257	35.8%
Black or African American	8,969	38.9%
American Indian and Alaska Native	127	0.6%
Asian	1,527	6.6%
Native Hawaiian and Other Pacific Islander	3	0.0%
Some other race	2,200	9.5%
Two or more races	1,977	8.6%

=== 2010 census ===
In 2010, Bear had a population of 19,371 people. The racial makeup of the CDP was 50.5% White, 34.5% African American, 0.3% Native American, 4.2% Asian, 0.0% Pacific Islander, 6.8% from other races, and 3.7% from two or more races. 14.2% of the population were Hispanic or Latino of any race.

=== 2000 census ===
As of the census of 2000, there were 17,593 people, 6,027 households, and 4,544 families residing in the CDP. The population density was 3,063.4 inhabitants per square mile (1,182.8/km^{2}). There were 6,265 housing units at an average density of 1,090.9 per square mile (421.2/km^{2}). The racial makeup of the CDP was 66.9% White, 26.8% African American, 0.2% Native American, 2.0% Asian, <0.1% Pacific Islander, 1.8% from other races, and 2.3% from two or more races. Hispanic or Latino of any race were 5.5% of the population.

There were 6,027 households, out of which 46.6% had children under the age of 18 living with them, 51.4% were married couples living together, 18.2% had a female householder with no husband present, and 24.6% were non-families. 18.2% of all households were made up of individuals, and 2.5% had someone living alone who was 65 years of age or older. The average household size was 2.92 and the average family size was 3.30.

In the CDP, the population was spread out, with 33.0% under the age of 18, 8.5% from 18 to 24, 36.7% from 25 to 44, 17.7% from 45 to 64, and 4.1% who were 65 years of age or older. The median age was 33.8 years, with a median of 32.8 for natives and 34.8 for foreigners. For every 100 females, there were 95.2 males. For every 100 females age 18 and over, there were 90.7 males.

=== Income ===
The median income for a household in the CDP in 2014 was $60,647. Males had an average income of $62,474 versus $48,706 for females. The per capita income for the CDP was $20,715. The largest demographic living in poverty were "Males from ages 6–11" and 13.2% of the population was below the poverty line which is lower than the national average of 15.5%. Additionally, 6.7% of those under age 18 and 7.3% of those age 65 or over were below the poverty line.

=== Military service ===
Bear has a large population of citizens who have served in the military. The most common service period was (1) Vietnam, (2) The Gulf War in the 1990s, and (3) The Gulf War in the 2000s.

== Education ==
Education for Bear CDP is provided by two public school districts and numerous private schools. The public districts are: Christina School District and Colonial School District.

=== Christina School District ===
May B. Leasure Elementary School of the Christina district is in Bear. Its namesake is Elizabeth May Brown Leasure (November 3, 1898 - November 8, 1982), a teacher. It was established as Eden School in 1879. It was started as a 1-8 school but became a 1-6 school as Newark High School began taking grades 7–8. A November 11, 1934, fire gutted the facility, so all of the school's classes temporarily moved to Lodge Hall; the school was already renting space there in 1934 for overflow classes. A new permanent facility opened in 1935. The school received its current name in 1970, and the current facility opened in 1998.

William A. Oberle Jr. Elementary School, also of the Christina district, is in Bear. The school, then Porter Road Elementary School, opened in 2009, and it changed to its current name in 2011. Its namesake was a member of the Delaware House of Representatives.

The Christina district part of Bear is zoned to as follows: Leasure, Oberle, and Keene elementary schools serve sections for grades K-5. It is divided between the zones of Gauger/Cobbs Middle School and Kirk Middle School. It is divided between the zones of Glasgow High School and Christiana High School.

In earlier periods, in addition to Leasure, elementary schools serving Bear included Keene, Marshall, and McVey. Grades 5-6 were assigned to schools in Wilmington, including Bancroft Intermediate School. Previously Shue/Medill Middle School served sections of Bear.

The Christina District also maintains the Eden Support Services Center in Bear.

=== Other education ===
The Colonial district operates William Penn High School.

The most prominent private schools located in Bear include: Caravel Academy, Red Lion Christian Academy, and Fairwinds Christian School. In 2010, 18.8% of students in New Castle County attended private schools.

No major universities are based in Bear, but Wilmington University's primary sports complex is located along U.S. Route 40.

New Castle County Library operates the Bear Library.

== Economy ==
In Bear, the most common industries are (1) healthcare and social assistance, (2) finance and insurance, and (3) retail trade. The highest paid jobs are in (1) utilities, (2) transportation and warehousing, and (3) professional, scientific, and technical services.

The median property value in Bear is $173,200, with the largest share of property values in housing units that fall within $200,000–$250,000. 68.5% of housing units are occupied by their owner, which is higher than the national average.

== Diversity ==
The most common countries of origin are (1) Mexico, (2) India, and (3) China, and there are a high number of people who were born in Kenya. The percentage of the population with U.S. citizenship is 92.4%.

Spanish is the most spoken non-English language, followed by Arabic.

== Transportation ==
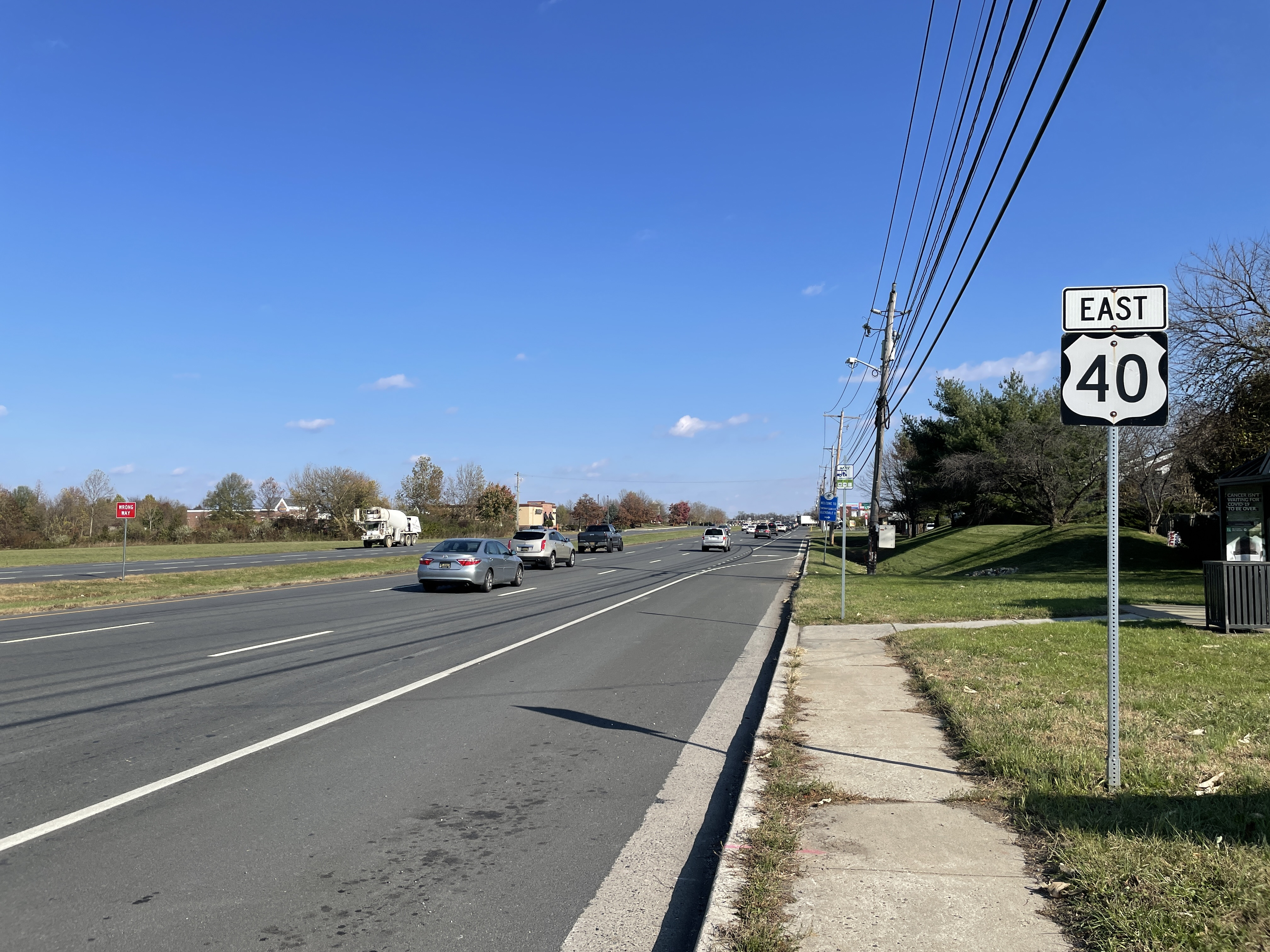
US 40 eastbound in Bear

Bear is located at the junction of east–west U.S. Route 40 and north–south Delaware Route 7. US 40 runs west to Glasgow and Elkton, Maryland and east to New Castle and the Delaware Memorial Bridge while DE 7 runs north to Christiana and south to Red Lion. The Delaware Route 1 freeway passes through Bear and has an interchange with US 40 serving the community. DE 1 heads north to an interchange with Interstate 95 in Christiana that provides access to Wilmington and the rest of the Northeast Megalopolis and south toward Dover and the Delaware Beaches.

DART First State provides bus service to Bear along Route 40, which runs between downtown Wilmington and Glasgow via the US 40 corridor; Route 54, which runs between Churchmans Crossing station and the Walmart on Wilton Boulevard via Bear; and Route 64, which runs between the Christiana Mall and Glasgow via Bear.

The Norfolk Southern Railway operates freight trains through Bear along the Delmarva Secondary line heading southeast from Newark and the New Castle Secondary line heading southwest from Wilmington; both lines meet to the south in Porter at a junction with the Delmarva Central Railroad. Along the Delmarva Secondary in Bear are Norfolk Southern's Del Pro Yard and Amtrak's Bear Maintenance Facility.

Automobiles are the most heavily used mode of transportation. The largest share of households has two cars, followed by three cars. There are state-led bus services and on-call DART services for people with disabilities. The average commute time to work is approximately 26.4 minutes, which is more than the state and national average. Most of these drivers are alone during their commute (82.6%).

== Notable people ==
- Anthony Dwayne McRae, perpetrator of the 2023 Michigan State University shooting and former Bear resident
- Barry Croft Jr., convicted co-leader of the 2020 plot to kidnap Michigan governor Gretchen Whitmer; resident of Bear
- Angelo Blackson, American football defensive tackle for the Chicago Bears of the National Football League (NFL); former Bear resident
- Ami Parekh, Indian-American figure skater who represented India in international competitions and was an eight-time Indian ladies' champion; resident of Bear
- Mark McKenzie, professional soccer player; grew up in Bear.
