= 80 Fetter Lane =

Building in London, England

Coordinates: 51°31′03″N 0°06′33″W

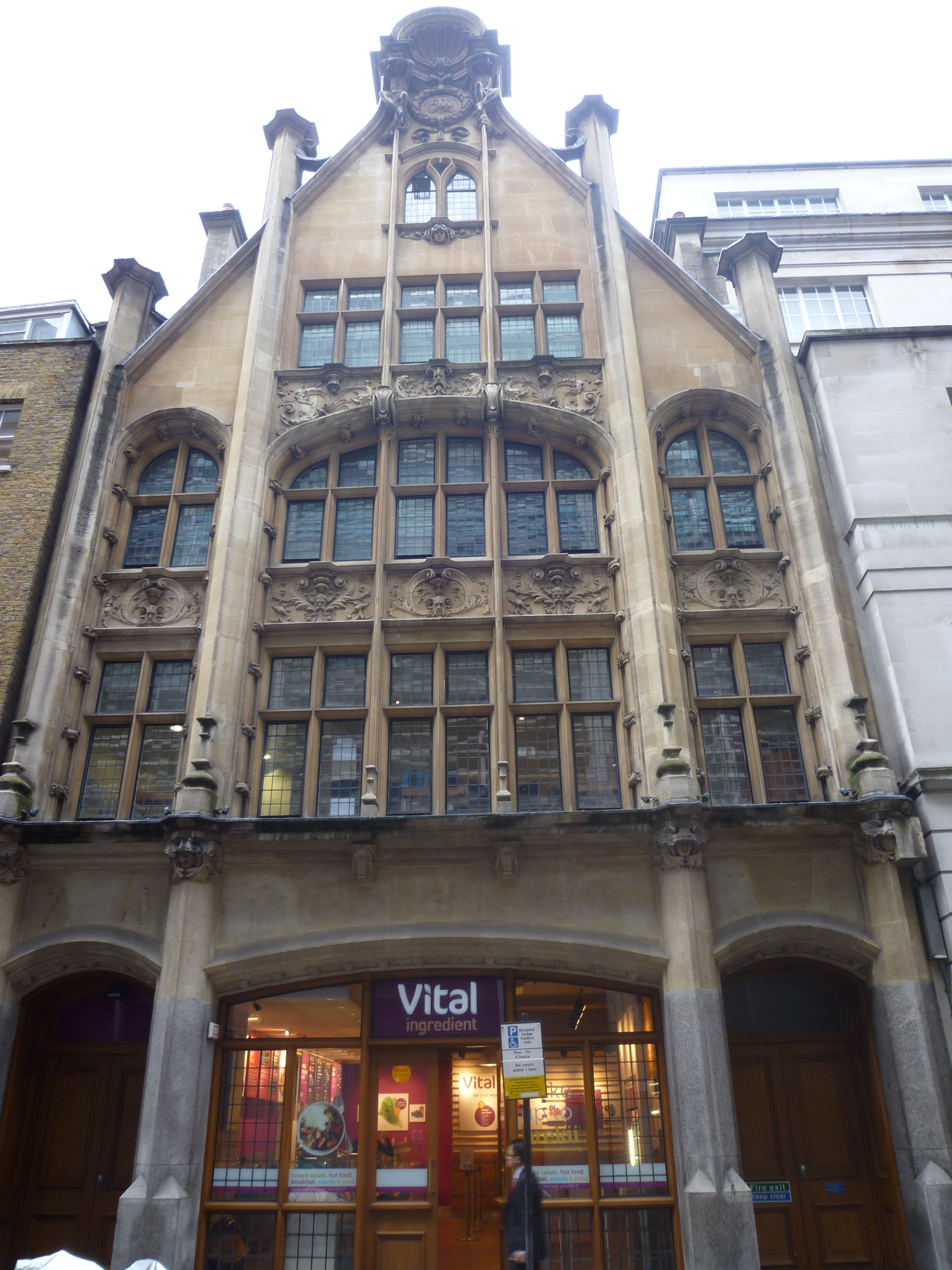
80 Fetter Lane

80 Fetter Lane is a Grade II listed building at 78–81 Fetter Lane, London. The building was designed by architects Treadwell & Martin for Buchanan's Distillery.
