= Fayetteville Township, Washington County, Arkansas =

Township of Fayetteville
- Township
- Fayetteville Township in Washington County, Arkansas (boundaries are identical to City of Fayetteville)
- Coordinates: 36°04′23″N 94°9′55″W
- Country: United States
- State: Arkansas
- County: Washington

Area
  - Total: 44.5 sq mi (115 km^{2})
  - Land: 43.5 sq mi (113 km^{2})
  - Water: 1.1 sq mi (2.8 km^{2}) 0%
- Elevation: 1,378 ft (420 m)

Population (2000)
  - Total: 58,047
  - Density: 1,337/sq mi (516/km^{2})
- Time zone: UTC-6 (CST)
  - Summer (DST): UTC-5 (CDT)
- Area code: 479
- GNIS feature ID: 2406952

Fayetteville Township is one of thirty-seven townships in Washington County, Arkansas, USA. The township had a population of 73,580 at the 2010 Census. The township contains the City of Fayetteville in its entirety, as the township and the city have identical boundaries.

== Geography ==
According to the United States Census Bureau, Fayetteville Township covers an area of 44.5 square miles (115 km^{2}), with 43.4 square miles (112 km^{2}) land and the remaining 1.1 square miles (2.8 km^{2}) water. The boundaries of Fayetteville Township are identical to the City of Fayetteville, which has taken from its neighboring township many times. As a result of the expansion of Fayetteville, the boundaries have become gerrymandered and follow the major routes as they leave town.

=== Neighborhoods ===
- Baldwin
- Barbara (historical)
- Fayette Junction
- McNair
- Rucker's Grove (historical)
- White Rock

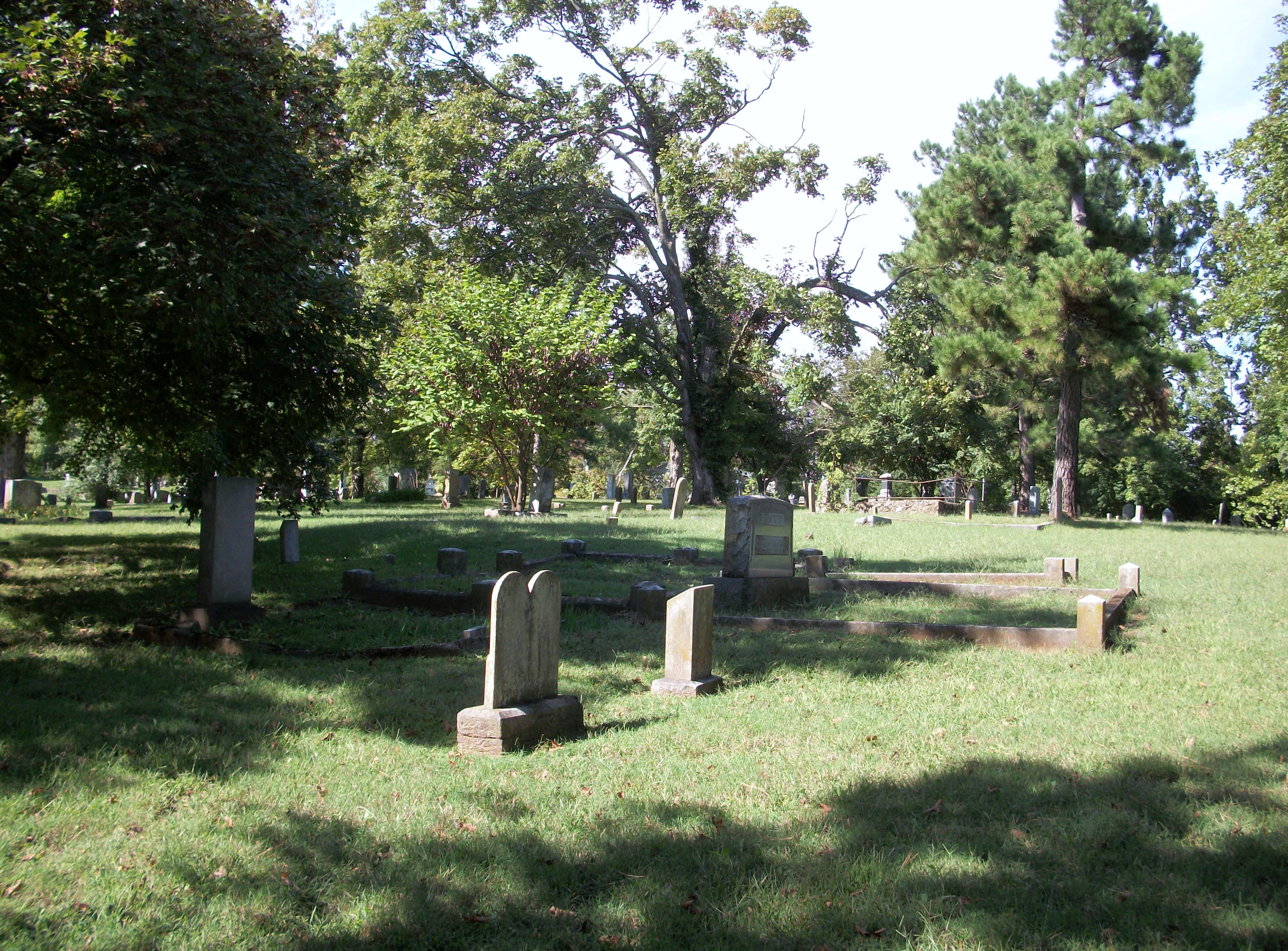
Evergreen Cemetery is located near the University of Arkansas in the central part of Fayetteville.

=== Cemeteries ===
The township contains eleven cemeteries:

- Bowell Cemetery
- Buckner Cemetery
- Combs Cemetery
- Fayetteville Confederate Cemetery
- Evergreen Cemetery
- Fairview Memorial Cemetery
- Fayetteville National Cemetery
- Mount Comfort Cemetery
- Stearns Cemetery
- Tharp Cemetery
- Walker Cemetery

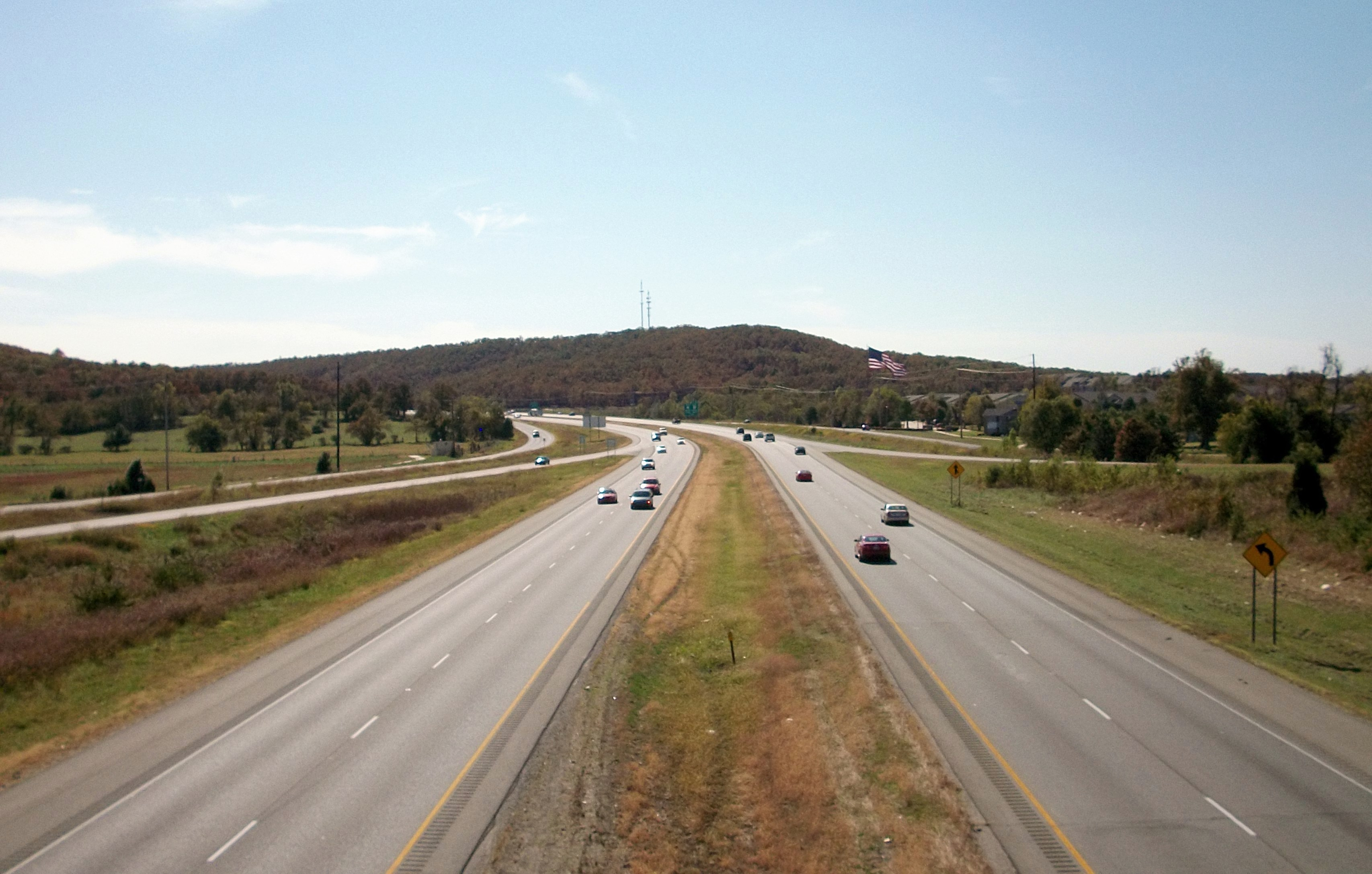
U.S. Route 71 is concurrent with Interstate 49 throughout Fayetteville Township, serving as the only freeway in the township.

=== Major routes ===
- I-49/US 71
- US 62
- US 71B
- Arkansas Highway 16
- Arkansas Highway 112
- Arkansas Highway 156
- Arkansas Highway 180
- Arkansas Highway 265
- Arkansas Highway 873

== See also ==
- University of Arkansas
- Dickson Street
