= Whitehall (Lincoln, Nebraska) =

- U.S. National Register of Historic Places
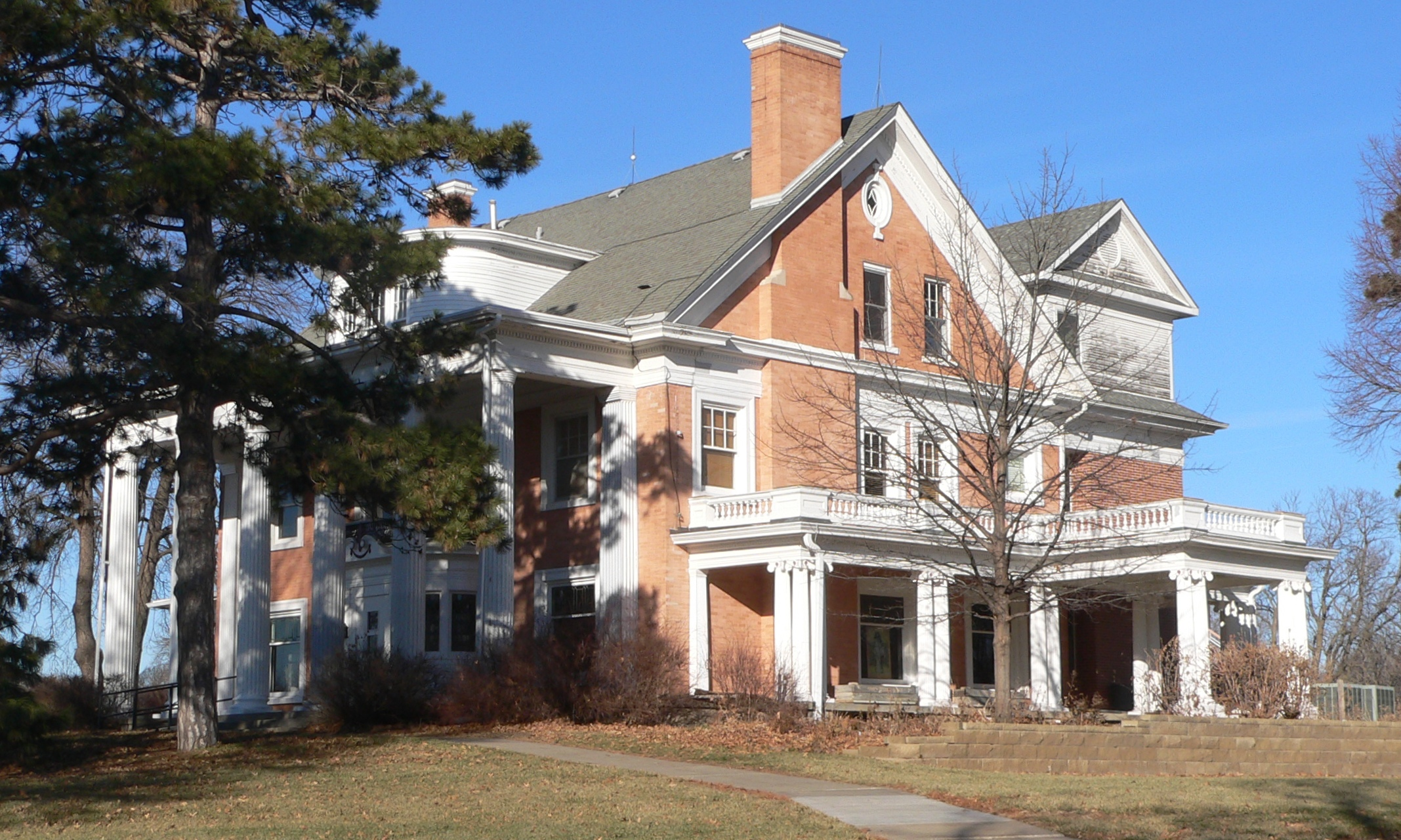
- The house in 2012

- Location within Nebraska Location within the United States
- Location: 5903 Walker, Lincoln, Nebraska
- Coordinates: 40°50′10″N 96°38′23″W
- Area: less than one acre
- Built: 1910
- Architectural style: Classical Revival
- NRHP reference No.: 82000610
- Added to NRHP: October 29, 1982

Whitehall is an historic house in Lincoln, Nebraska. It was built in 1910 and has been listed on the National Register of Historic Places since October 29, 1982.

== History ==
Whitehall was built in University Place, which was an incorporated community at the time, but was later annexed by the city of Lincoln. Whitehall is located about one-half mile from the campus of Nebraska Wesleyan University, with which the home shares several connections.

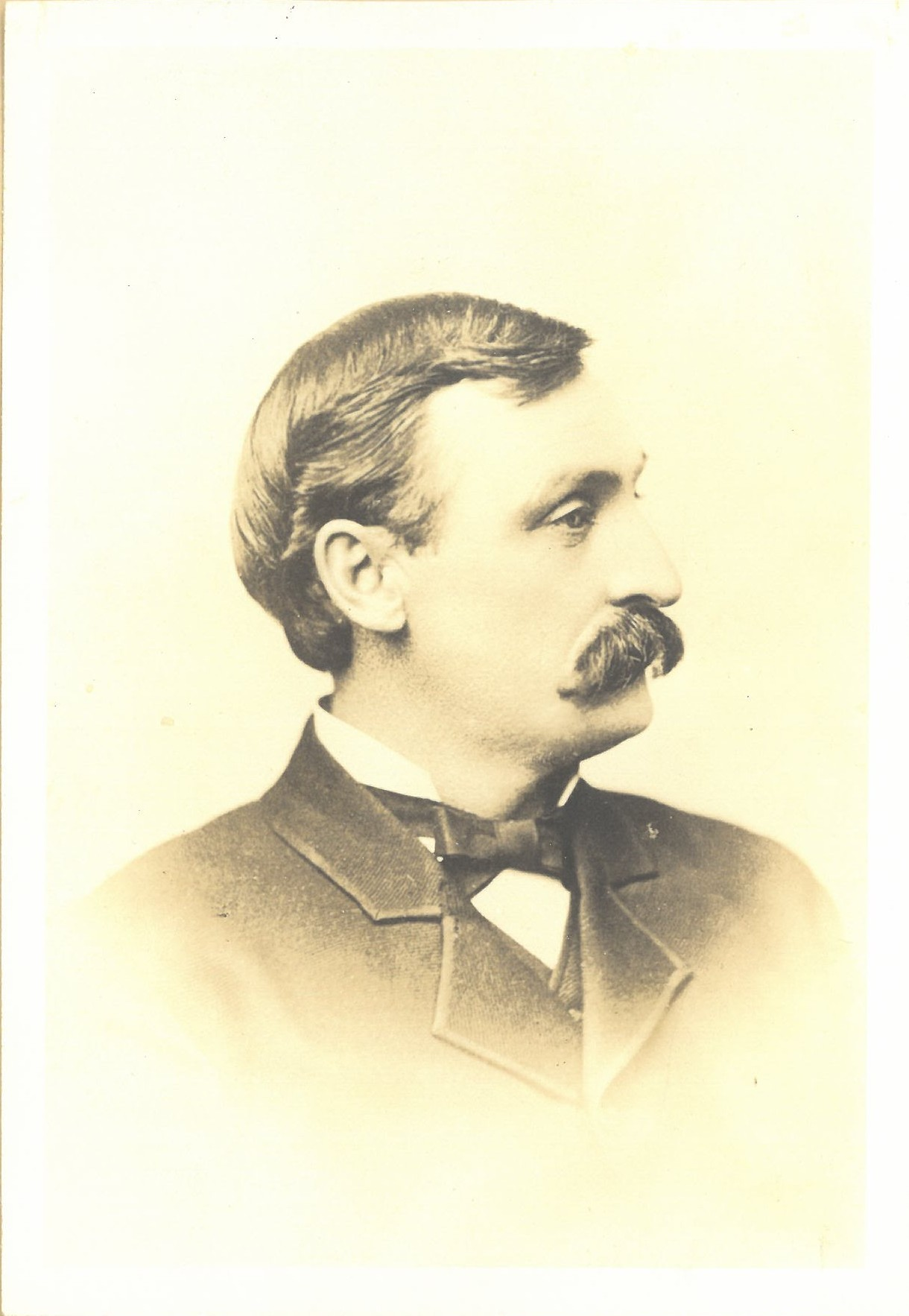
Charles Clarke White (1843-1895)

The mansion was built for Olive Johnson White (1848-1935), 15 years after the death of her husband, Charles Clarke White (1843-1895). Mrs. White was the daughter of Nebraska homesteaders Andrew and Mary A. (Lytle) Johnson,) who settled near Valparaiso, Nebraska, in 1865. She and her husband were married in 1868 by judge Luke Lavender in what was likely the first wedding in Lancaster County. During the time that Mrs. White lived at Whitehall, she hosted many social events in the house.

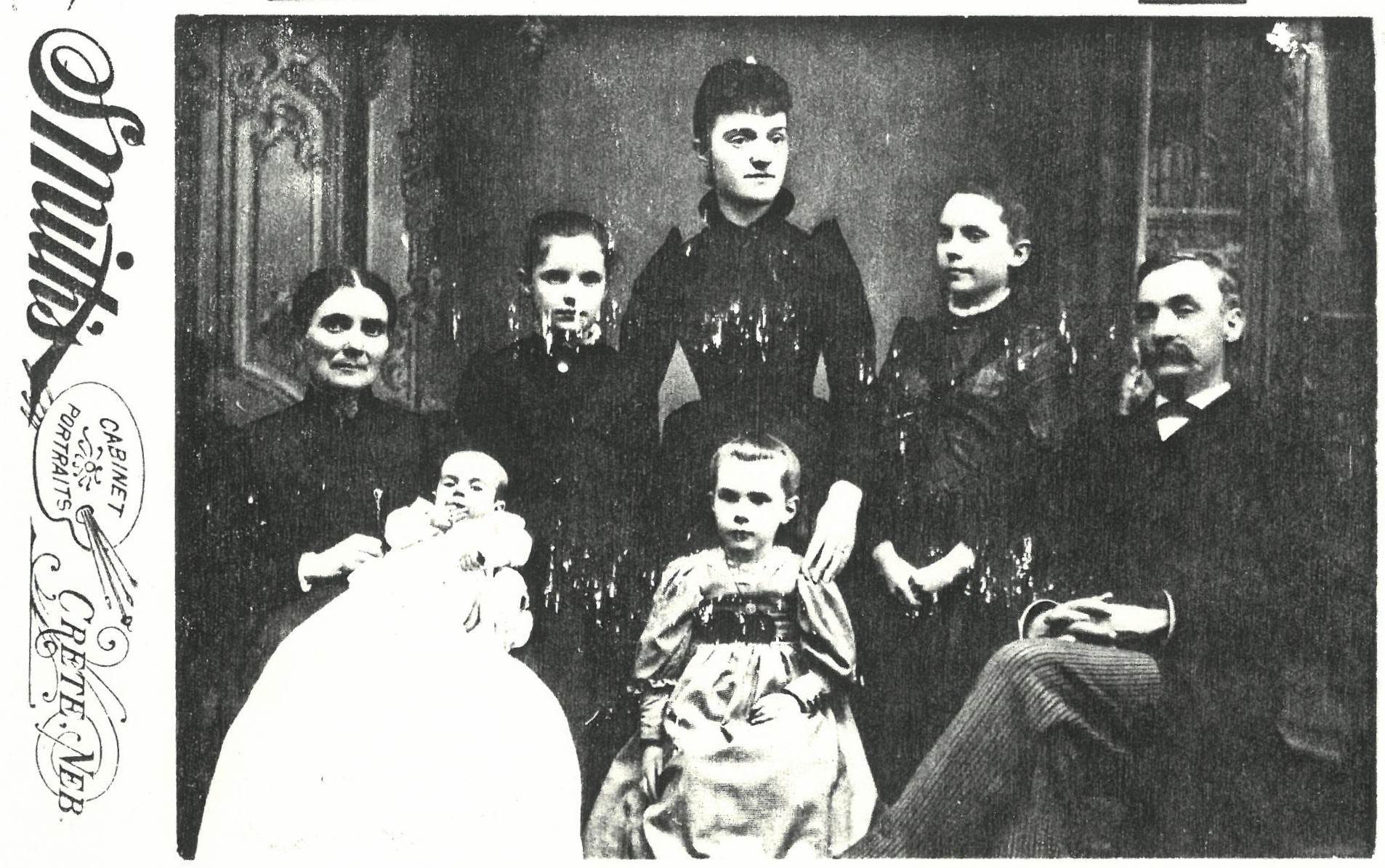
Mr. and Mrs. C.C. White and family

Mr. and Mrs. White were both significant supporters of Nebraska Wesleyan University in its first two decades. Mr. White, a successful mill owner, was on the university's original board of trustees. Mrs. White, an active member of the Women's Wesleyan Educational Council (WWEC), made substantial financial contributions to reduce the university's debt and increase its endowment -- the latter in response to a matching gift challenge from Andrew Carnegie. Support from the WWEC and from Mrs. White also made it possible to erect a music building on campus that was named in memory of C.C. White.

The house was bought by the state of Nebraska in 1927 to serve as a home for children, and in 1981 it was owned by the Department of Public Welfare of the state. New housing for children is located on the property (not included in this nomination), and the house is used as offices.

== Architecture ==
The house was designed in the Classical Revival architectural style. Design features of the two and one-half story house include "a foundation and trim of light Bedford stone and a large frontal porch of reinforced concrete," as well as six Ionic columns in the front.
