= White Hall (Bear, Delaware) =

Historic house in Delaware, United States

- U.S. National Register of Historic Places
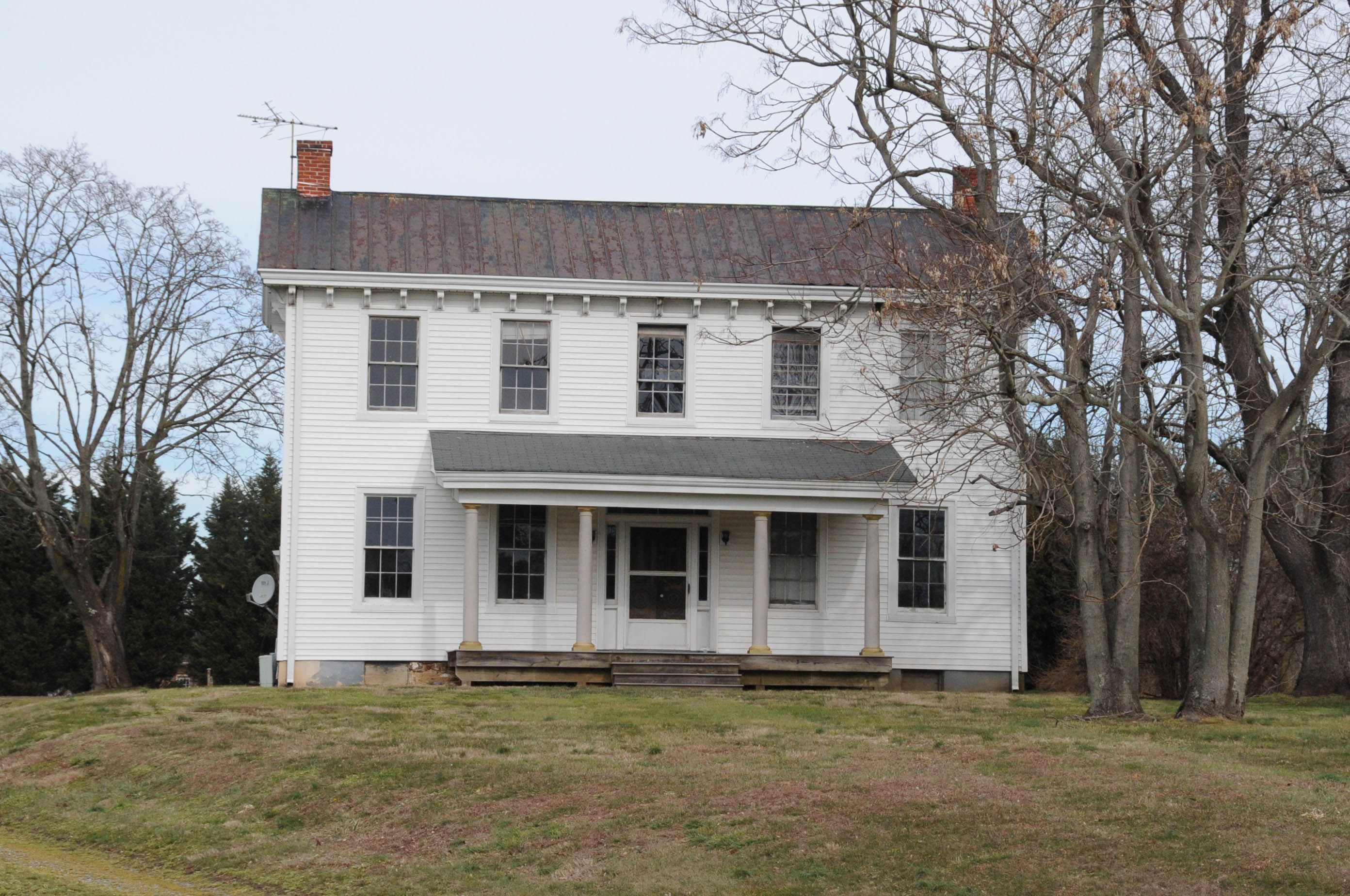

- Location within Delaware Location within the United States
- Location: 130 Michael Ln., Bear, Delaware
- Coordinates: 39.57343°N 75.72125°W
- Area: 4.3 acres (1.7 ha)
- Architectural style: Greek Revival, Italianate
- NRHP reference No.: 90001072
- Added to NRHP: July 12, 1990

White Hall, also known as the William Cann Tenant House and Andrew Elliason Tenant House, is a historic home located at Bear, New Castle County, Delaware. It was built in three phases during the 19th century between about 1830 and 1860, and is a two-story, five-bay frame dwelling with a gable roof. It has a 2 1/2-story rear wing that creates a "T" configuration. It is in a vernacular Greek Revival / Italianate-style. Also on the property are a contributing frame dairy barn, a concrete block milk house, and a frame implement shed, all dated to the 1930s.

It was listed on the National Register of Historic Places in 1990.
