= Weeks, Arkansas =

Unincorporated community in Arkansas, US

Coordinates: 34°52′53″N 94°25′07″W

Weeks is an unincorporated community in Scott County, in the U.S. state of Arkansas.

== History ==
Weeks was founded in the 1880s, and named after the local Weeks family. A variant name was "Week". A post office was established at Weeks in 1902, and remained in operation until 1922.
