= Wheeler, Arkansas =

Coordinates: 36°06′51″N 94°15′33″W

Wheeler is an unincorporated community in Washington County, in the U.S. state of Arkansas. The community is approximately four miles northwest of Fayetteville and lies adjacent to the Clear Creek floodplain.

== History ==
A post office called Wheeler was established in 1873, and remained in operation until 1996.
