= Treadwell & Martin =

English architecture partnership (1890–1910)

Treadwell & Martin were a firm of architects in London from 1890 to 1910. The partners were Leonard Martin (1869–1936) and Henry John Treadwell (1861–1910).

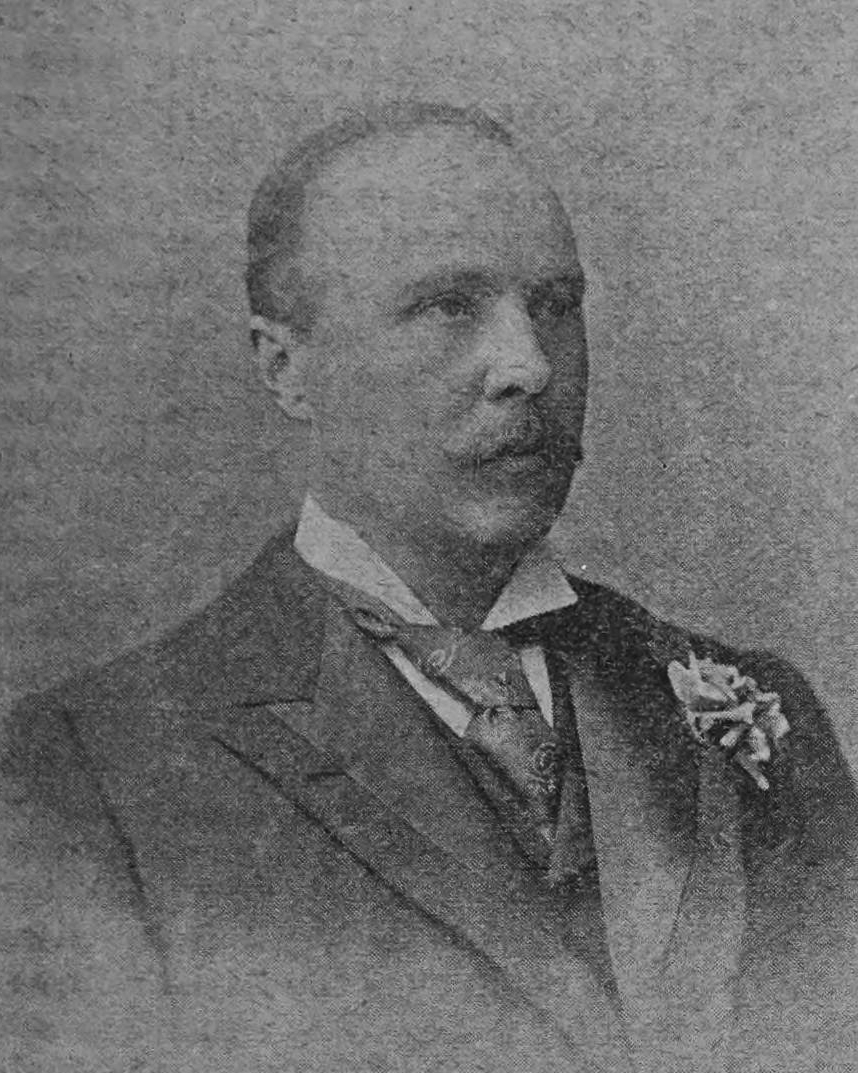
Henry John Treadwell

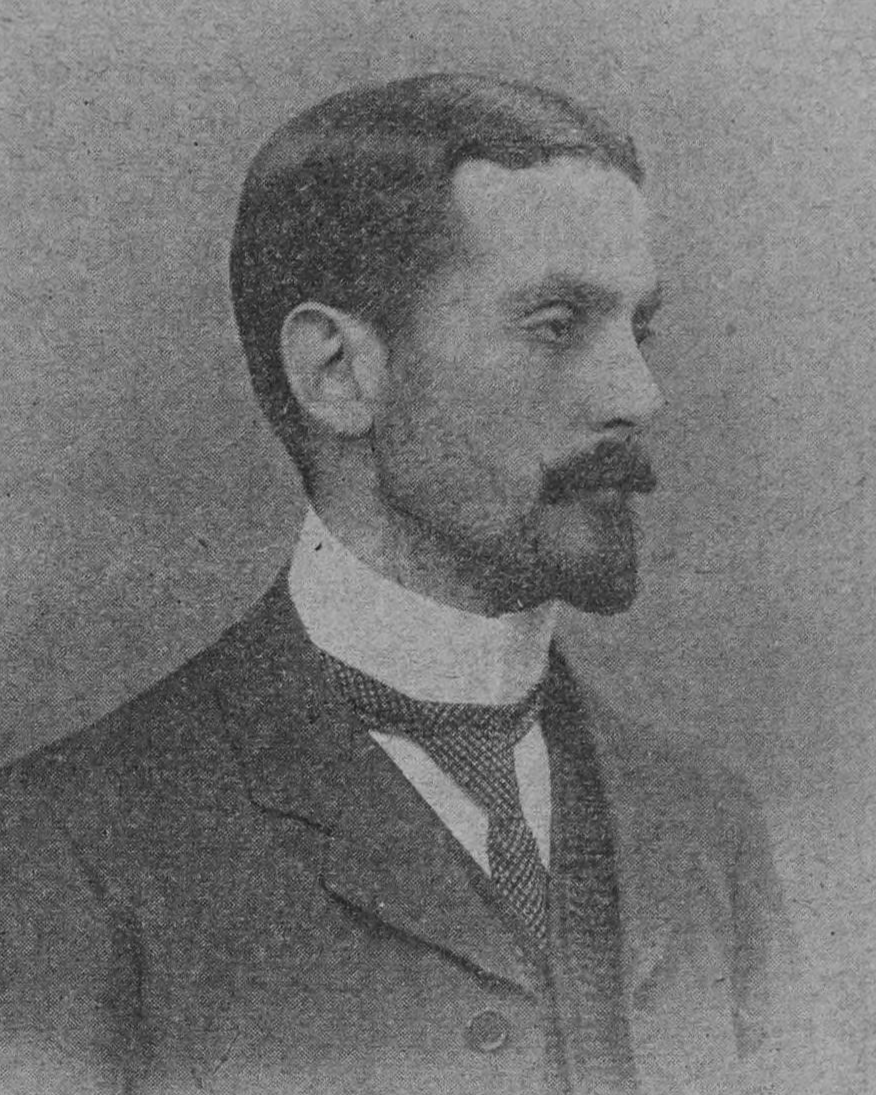
Leonard Martin

The firm was responsible for the design of Scott's restaurant in Coventry Street (1892–94), The Old Shades, a Grade II listed public house at 37–39 Whitehall, 80 Fetter Lane, built for Buchanan's Distillery, and the Rising Sun pub on Tottenham Court Road.

Treadwell & Martin's design for the Glasgow Art Gallery and Museum was shortlisted but unsuccessful.

== Gallery ==
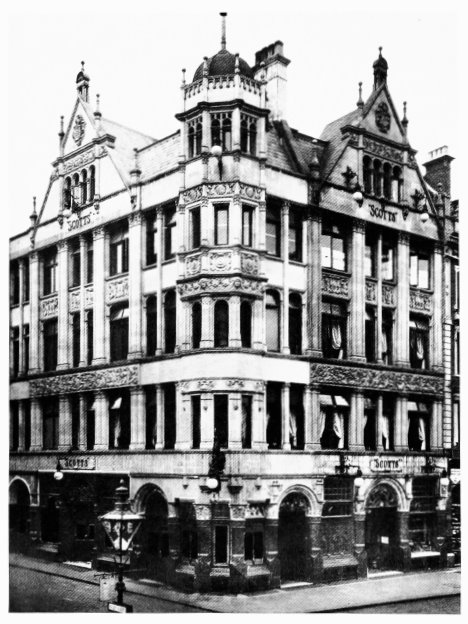
Scott's

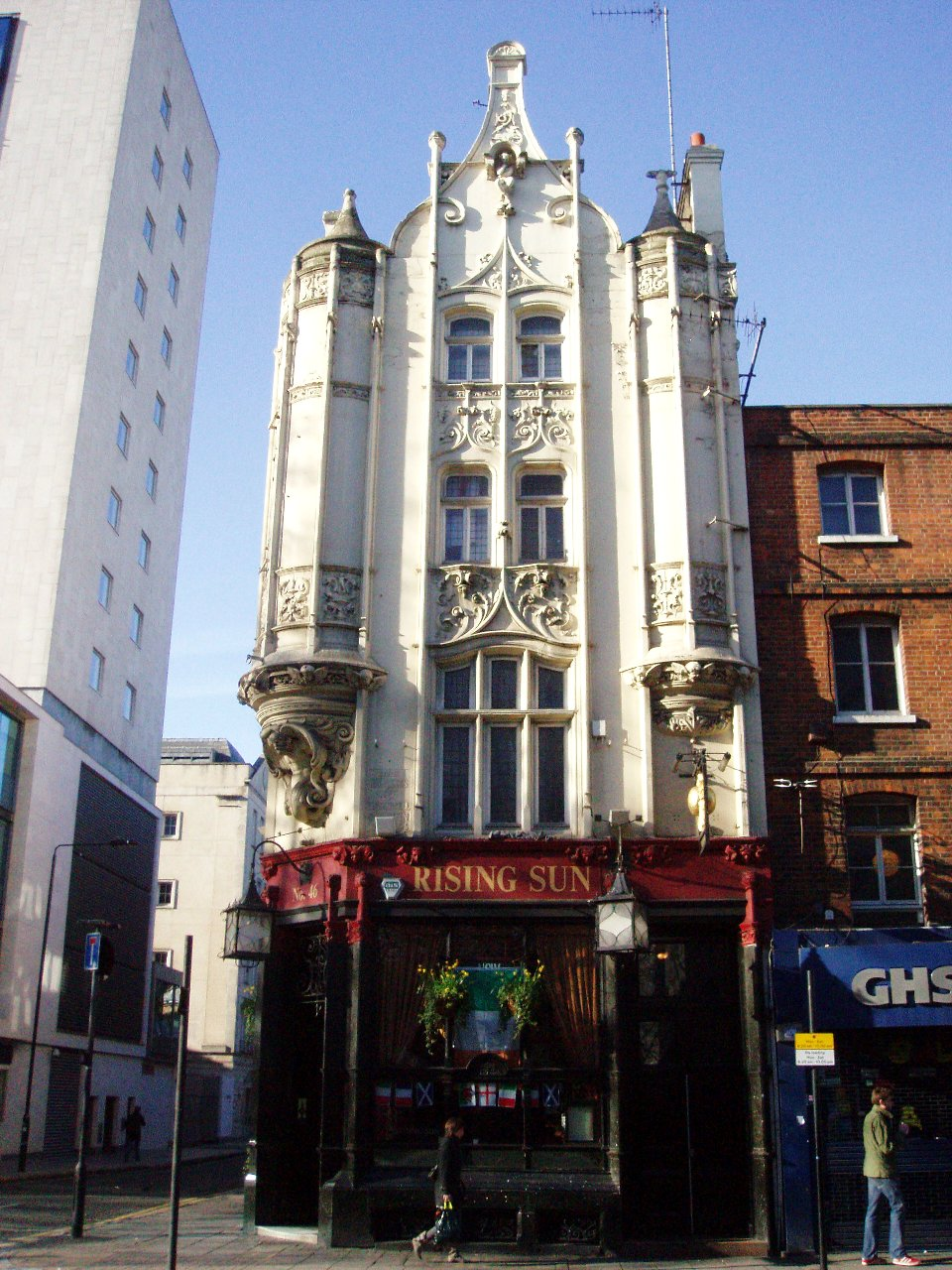
Rising Sun
