= The Old Shades =

Pub in Whitehall, London

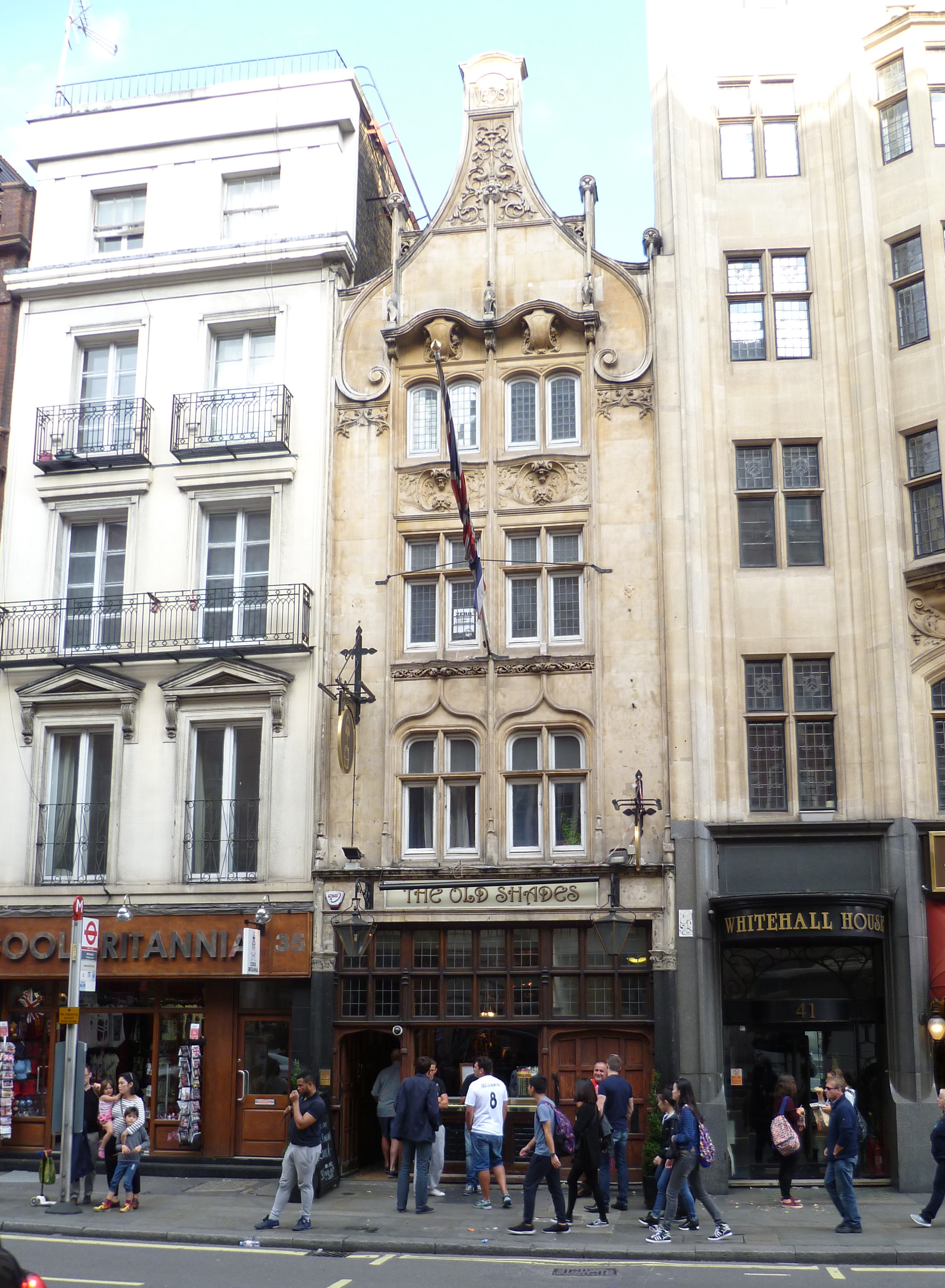
- The Old Shades

- Location within City of Westminster Location within Greater London

General information
- Location: 37–39 Whitehall, London, England
- Coordinates: 51.506486°N 0.12691162°W
- Opened: 1898

Design and construction
- Architecture firm: Treadwell and Martin
- Designations

Listed Building – Grade II
- Official name: Old Shades Public House
- Designated: 5 February 1970
- Reference no.: 1267004

The Old Shades is a Grade II listed public house at 37–39 Whitehall, London SW1.

It was built in 1898 by the architects Treadwell and Martin.

As of January 2020, it is operated by the Young's pub chain.
