= A. R. Winfield =

American Methodist preacher (died 1887)

- Died: 1887
- Occupation: Methodist preacher
- Known for: Editor of the Arkansas Methodist

A. R. Winfield (d. 1887) was an American Methodist preacher. He was the editor of the Arkansas Methodist, and "one of the most widely known Methodist divines in the South." His obituary in the Arkansas Democrat read, "No minister of the gospel in Arkansas was so widely known."
