= Whitehall (Columbus, Mississippi) =

Historic house in the US

Coordinates: 33.489513°N 88.429365°W

Whitehall in Columbus, Mississippi, also known as J.W. Hardy Estate, is an antebellum architecture historic house.

Built in 1843 by prominent attorney and planter James Walton Harris, Whitehall is a classic example of Greek Revival architecture. Half-pilasters attached to the façade add a graceful accent to the house. The original property extended over the entire city block and included gardens, stables, a carriage house, and slaves' quarters. During the Civil War it served as a hospital for Confederate soldiers.

During World War II the Columbus Civil Air Patrol unit often met in the living room at Whitehall. The basement at Whitehall was turned into a servicemen's club called the "Drop in Hangar". It was decorated with war time Disney cartoon images, several inscribed "Happy landings at Whitehall - Walt Disney". (Source Ida Billups Ward, conveyed by Rufus Ward.)

Whitehall can be visited during the Columbus, Mississippi Spring Pilgrimage of antebellum homes.
