= Woodyardville, Arkansas =

- Unincorporated community
- Location within Arkansas Location within the United States
- Coordinates: 34°39′56″N 92°16′12″W
- Country: United States
- State: Arkansas
- County: Pulaski
- Elevation: 289 ft (88 m)
- Time zone: UTC-6 (Central (CST))
  - Summer (DST): UTC-5 (CDT)
- Area code: 501
- GNIS feature ID: 78808

Woodyardville (also Feltons Store) is an unincorporated community in Pulaski County, Arkansas, United States.
