= Whistleville, Arkansas =

Unincorporated community in Arkansas, US

Coordinates: 35°46′17″N 90°07′34″W

Whistleville is an unincorporated community in Mississippi County, Arkansas, in the United States.
