= White Rock Conservation Park =

Coordinates: 27°41′12″S 152°51′10″E

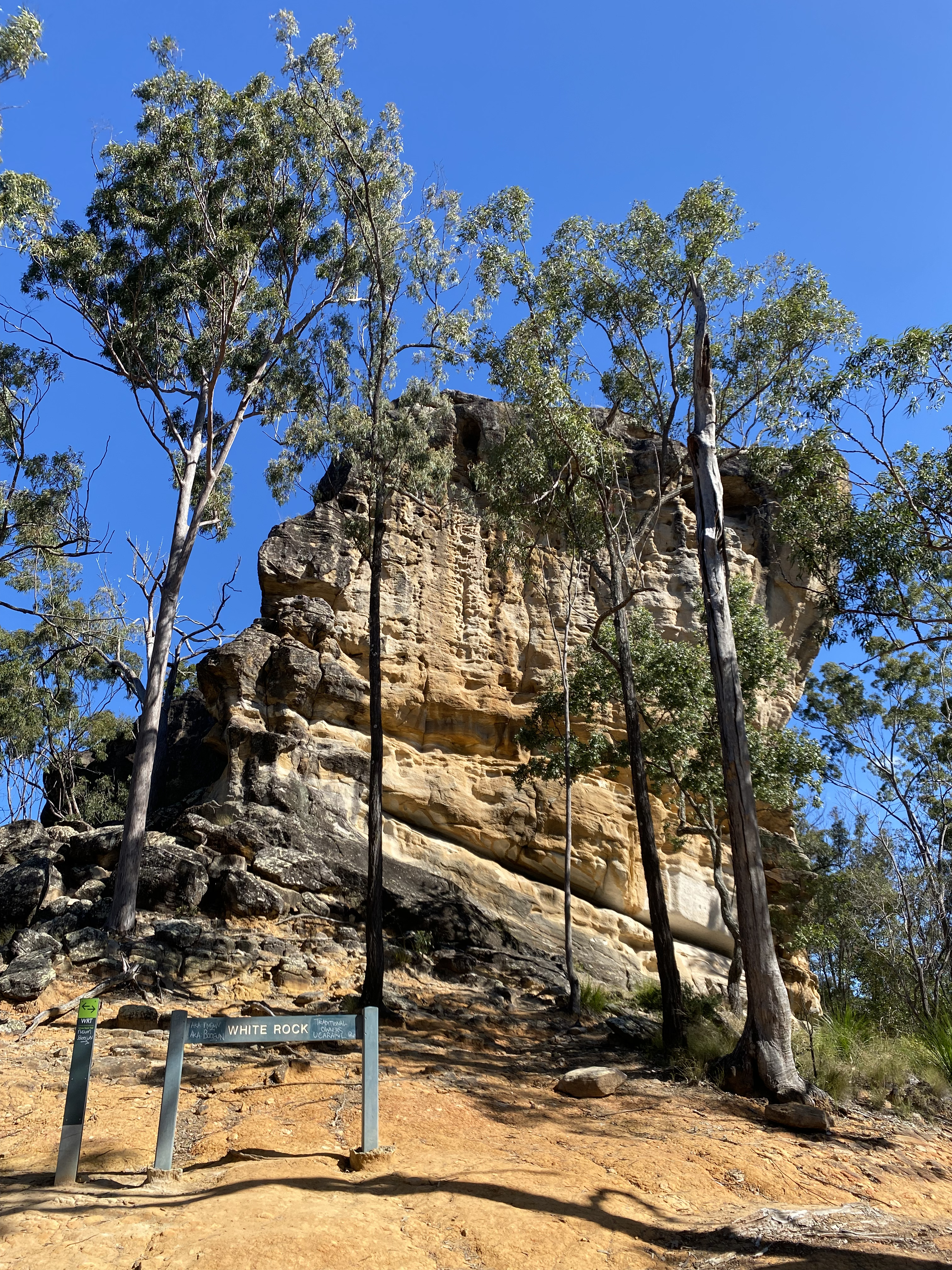
Base of White Rock

White Rock, a prominent pale-coloured rockface on a peak, is the major feature of interest of the White Rock Conservation Park, situated within the White Rock, Queensland (Ipswich) locality, Australia. It is also known as "Nugum" to the traditional owners, the Ugarapul people.

White Rock is a white sandstone outcrop and one of many on the ridge. The rock has views in all directions although there are small trees on top. The rock is quite soft and is covered with graffiti, from as early as 1919.

The area was used as a training area by American forces in the late 1930s and 1940s. This protected the area from logging with munitions lodged in trees creating risk for timber cutters.

== Walking tracks ==
The tracks in White Rock Conservation Park are a mixture of well-maintained near the carpark and unmaintained elsewhere.

=== White Rock Walking Track ===
This out-and-back track leads from the car park at Paperbark Flats Picnic Area located at the end of School Road to White Rock itself alongside the gully for most of the way. It is for the most part a gently graded well formed 6.5 kilometres (4.0 mi) walk, although much of the route is on a vehicle track.

In dry weather the track is covered with bulldust. In wet seasons there are often water obstacles to be crossed. There is a steep and rugged climb to the foot of White Rock at the end.

The traditional owners have requested that people refrain from climbing White Rock.

Local wildlife including echidnas, wallabies, kangaroos and even dingoes have been observed in the area. The area has abundant bird life, including endangered species such as the glossy black cockatoo.

=== The Ridge Track ===
An alternative route for most of the distance from the carpark to the Rock follows the ridge instead of the vehicle track. This is a Class 5 (Australian Standard) walk.

The eastern end of this track is obvious from the foot of the Rock, but the western (start) end is not obvious and is not well signposted. The Western path has been updated as of April 2008 by the local council and is easily seen and has a clear track. The Ridge Track starts 50 metres (160 ft) further along the vehicle track.

=== Little White Rock Track ===
Little White Rock Track is a 250 metres (820 ft) diversion from the main White Rock Track. The walk is a Class 3 (Australian Standard) walk and travels up the hill to the sandstone outcrop.

=== Boardwalk ===
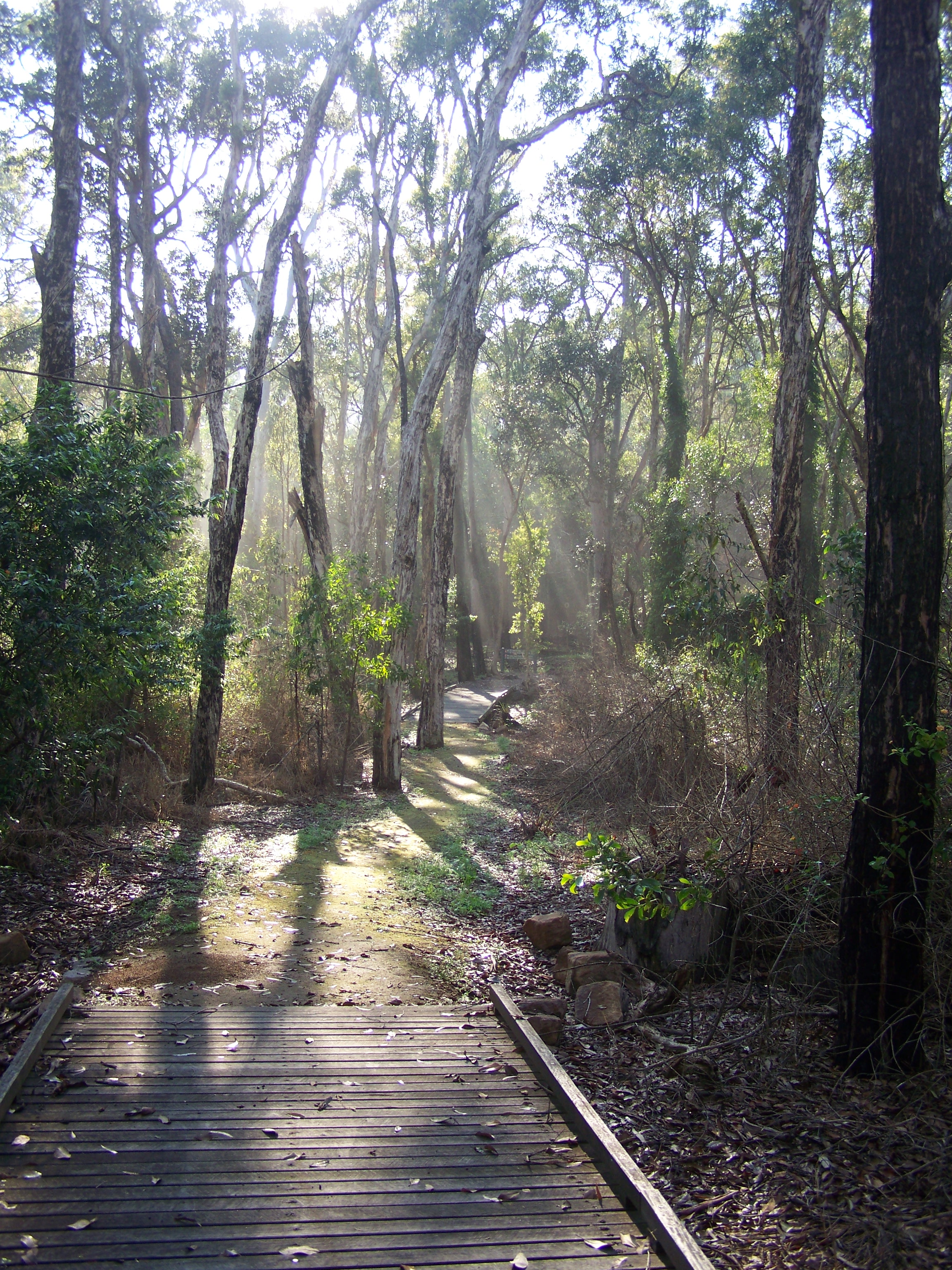
Six Mile Creek Boardwalk, 2010

Six Mile Creek boardwalk is a 375 metres (1,230 ft) diversion from the main White Rock Track and transverses in a loop through paperbark forest. The boardwalk is a Class 2 (Australian Standard) walk. Depending on the time of year the area has abundant birdlife. There is also a significant intrusion of lantana.

=== North Valley Track ===
The North Valley Track is for advanced bush walkers only. This is an unmarked track. The north valley track used to be a vehicle track like most of the main tracks but is now overgrown and used mostly by dirt bike riders.

== See also ==
- Protected areas of Queensland
