= Winfield, Arkansas =

Unincorporated community in Arkansas, US

Coordinates: 34°53′11″N 94°11′11″W

Winfield is an unincorporated community in Scott County, in the U.S. state of Arkansas.

== History ==
Winfield was founded in 1882. A post office called Winfield was established in 1882, and remained in operation until 1932.
