= White Rock, Washington County, Arkansas =

White Rock, Arkansas
- Unincorporated community
- White Rock's position in Arkansas White Rock, Arkansas (the United States)
- Coordinates: 36°4′46″N 94°15′9″W
- Country: United States
- State: Arkansas
- County: Washington
- Township: Fayetteville
- Elevation: 1,250 ft (380 m)
- Time zone: UTC-6 (Central (CST))
  - Summer (DST): UTC-5 (CDT)
- ZIP code: 72701
- Area code: 479
- GNIS feature ID: 74125

White Rock is an unincorporated community in Fayetteville Township, Washington County, Arkansas, United States. It is located about three miles west of Fayetteville on Arkansas Highway 16. Goose Creek is just south of the community.
