= Whitehall, Poinsett County, Arkansas =

Whitehall, Arkansas
- Unincorporated community
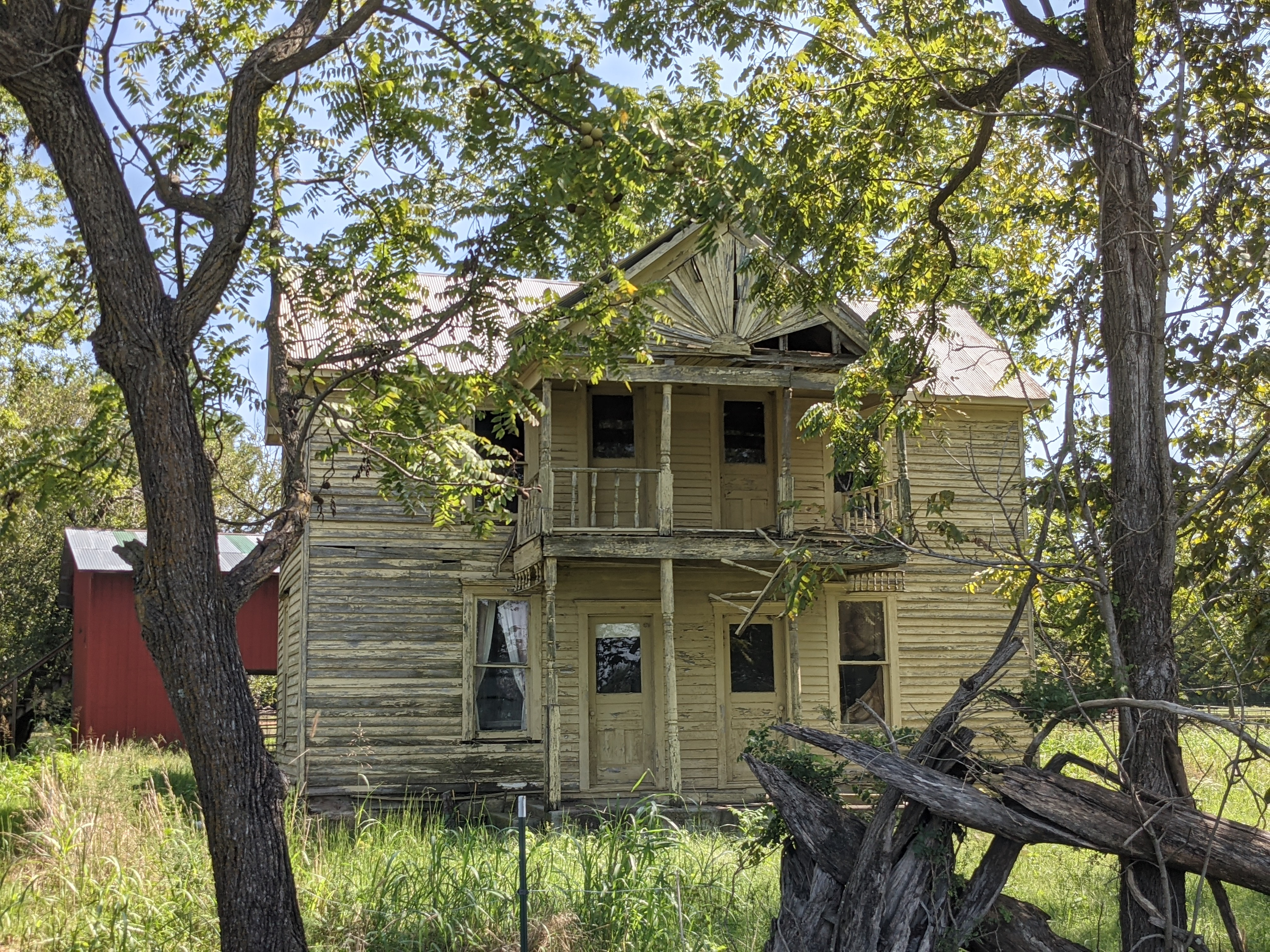
- Bacon Hotel

- Whitehall's position in Arkansas. Whitehall, Arkansas (the United States)
- Coordinates: 35°28′49″N 90°44′8″W
- Country: United States
- State: Arkansas
- County: Poinsett
- Township: Scott
- Elevation: 269 ft (82 m)
- Time zone: UTC-6 (Central (CST))
  - Summer (DST): UTC-5 (CDT)
- Area code: 870
- GNIS feature ID: 78764

This community was formerly named White Hall, see White Hall, Arkansas for the modern day community.

Whitehall, Arkansas (formerly White Hall) is an unincorporated community in Scott Township, Poinsett County, Arkansas, United States. Whitehall is located at the intersection of Arkansas Highway 1 and Arkansas Highway 214.
