= White Rock, Franklin County, Arkansas =

White Rock, Arkansas
- Unincorporated community
- White Rock's position in Arkansas White Rock, Arkansas (the United States)
- Coordinates: 35°34′54″N 93°58′10″W
- Country: United States
- State: Arkansas
- County: Franklin
- Township: White Rock
- Elevation: 823 ft (251 m)
- Time zone: UTC-6 (Central (CST))
  - Summer (DST): UTC-5 (CDT)
- Area code: 479
- GNIS feature ID: 78763

White Rock (formerly Whiterock) is an unincorporated community in White Rock Township, Franklin County, Arkansas, United States.
