= Marlon Blackwell =

American architect (born 1956)

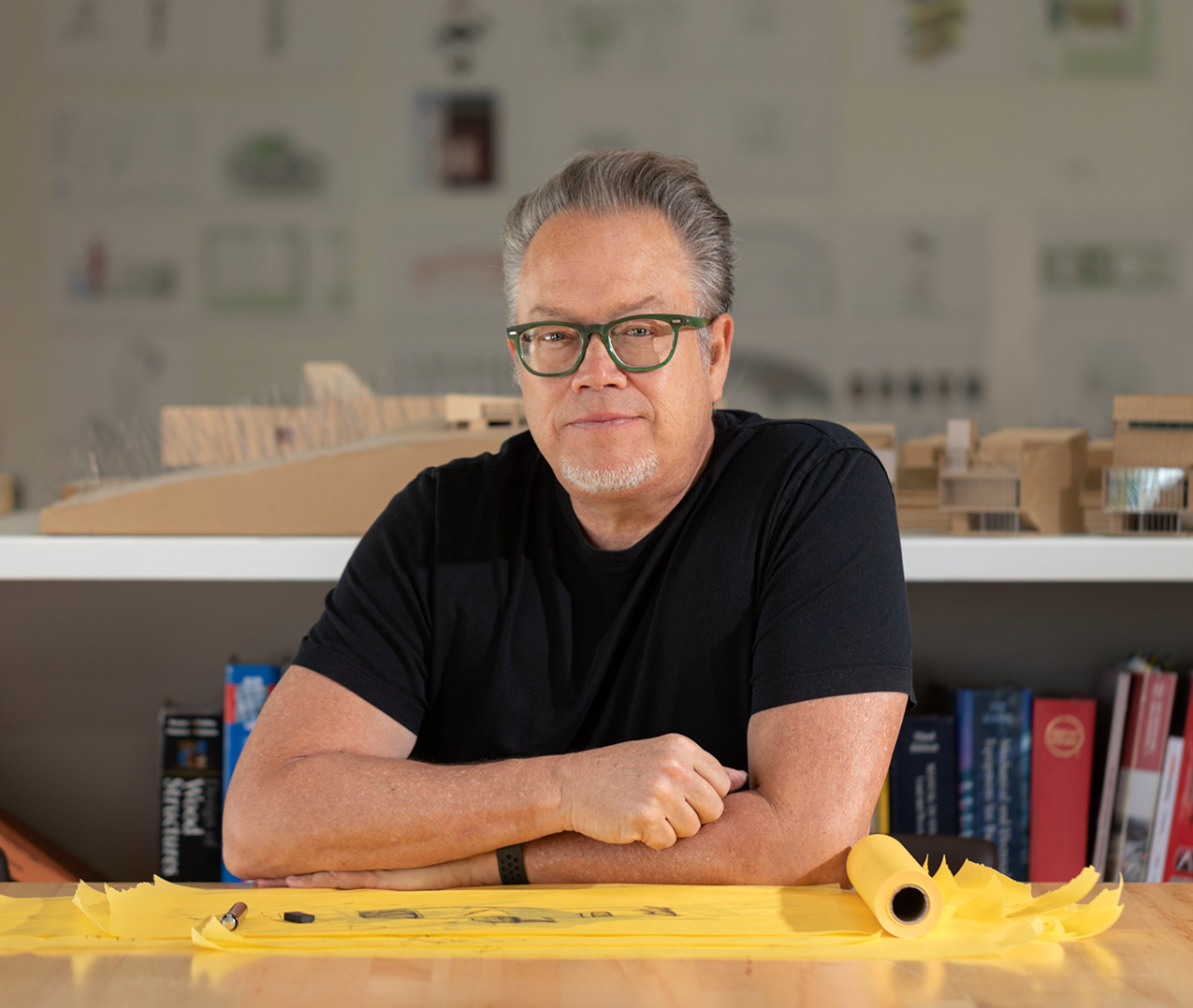
- Born: November 7, 1956 (age 69); Fürstenfeldbruck, Germany
- Education: Auburn University, Syracuse University in Florence, Italy
- Occupations: Architect; principal-owner
- Spouse(s): Meryati Johari Blackwell (married 1994–present). Principal and co-owner
- Awards: AIA Gold Medal (2020); United States Artists Ford Fellow (2014); American Academy of Arts and Letters Architecture Prize (2012)
- Practice: Marlon Blackwell Architects
- Projects: Ruth Lilly Visitors Pavilion, Indianapolis Museum of Art; Museum Store at Crystal Bridges Museum of American Art; Saint Nicholas Orthodox Church (Arkansas); Vol Walker Hall−Steven L. Anderson Design Center; Keenan TowerHouse; Shelby Farms Park
- Website: Official website

Marlon Blackwell (born November 7, 1956) is an American architect and university professor in Arkansas. He is a Fellow of the American Institute of Architects.

He is founder and principal at Marlon Blackwell Architects, a design firm established in 1992 in Fayetteville.

Blackwell is the E. Fay Jones Chair in Architecture and a Distinguished Professor in the Fay Jones School of Architecture and Design at the University of Arkansas in Fayetteville.

== Early life and career ==
Marlon Blackwell was born November 7, 1956, in Fürstenfeldbruck, Germany. He grew up near Air Force bases in the Philippines, Alabama, Florida, Colorado, and Montana. He received a Bachelor of Architecture from Auburn University and a Master of Architecture II from Syracuse University (in Florence, Italy). During college, he spent five summers in the rural South as a Bible salesman for the Thomas Nelson Publishing Company. After completing his undergraduate degree, he practiced in firms in Lafayette, Louisiana, and Boston, Massachusetts. Following his graduate degree, he was a visiting professor at Syracuse University.

He has taught at the University of Arkansas in Fayetteville since 1992. He co-founded the University of Arkansas Mexico Summer Urban Studio at the Casa Luis Barragán in Mexico City and taught in the program for many years beginning in 1996. He served as head of the architecture department from 2009 to 2015.

In 1992, he founded Marlon Blackwell Architects (originally Marlon Blackwell Architect).

He authored the book An Architecture of the Ozarks: The Works of Marlon Blackwell (Princeton Architectural Press, 2006). This monograph of his design work features nine built residential and commercial projects and three residential prototypes. The book includes essays by Juhani Pallasmaa, Dan Hoffman and David Buege.

In 1994, he married Meryati Johari. They live in Fayetteville with their two children. Meryati Johari Blackwell is an architect, principal and co-owner at Marlon Blackwell Architects.

== Notable career achievements ==
=== Honors and awards ===
Blackwell is the recipient of numerous awards and honors, including the 2020 AIA Gold Medal, the 2020 Southeastern Conference Professor of the Year, and the 2016 National Design Award for Architecture Design from Cooper-Hewitt, Smithsonian Design Museum. In 2014, he was named a United States Artists Ford Fellow (in Architecture and Design). In 2012, he received the Architecture Prize from the American Academy of Arts and Letters. In 2023 Blackwell was elected as a member to the American Academy of Arts & Sciences.

Blackwell was inducted into the National Academy of Design in 2018. He was the William A. Bernoudy Architect in Residence at the American Academy in Rome in 2018–2019. He was elected to the American Institute of Architects College of Fellows in 2009. In 1998, the Architectural League of New York selected him as an "Emerging Voice" in architecture.

Sixteen projects by Blackwell's firm have been recognized with national awards by The American Institute of Architects (AIA), including the AIA Honor Awards for Thaden School (with EskewDumezRipple and Andropogon Associates) (2023), The Lamplighter School Innovation Lab (2021), Shelby Farms Park (with James Corner Field Operations) (2019), Vol Walker Hall-Steven L. Anderson Design Center at the University of Arkansas (2018), the Crystal Bridges Museum Store at Crystal Bridges Museum of American Art (2015), the Little Rock Creative Corridor (2014), St. Nicholas Eastern Orthodox Church (2013), and the Ruth Lilly Visitors Pavilion at the Indianapolis Museum of Art (2012). He has won AIA Housing Awards for Graphic House (2017) and L-Stack House (2008).

The Saint Nicholas Orthodox Church in Springdale, Arkansas, received the 2011 World Architecture Festival, Best Civic and Community Building. It also won the 2012 American Institute of Architects (AIA) National Small Project Award.

Other awards and distinctions include several American Architecture Awards from the Chicago Athenaeum for Harvey Pediatric Clinic (2017), University of Arkansas School of Architecture Addition and Renovation (2014), Fayetteville Montessori Elementary (2014), Ruth Lilly Visitors Pavilion at the Indianapolis Museum of Art (2012), and Saint Nicholas Orthodox Church (2011).

In addition, the Harvey Pediatric Clinic in Rogers, Arkansas, received the 2017 Healthcare Design Award from the American Institute of Architects (AIA) Academy of Architecture for Health. The Gentry Public Library in Gentry, Arkansas, received the 2009 National AIA / ALA Library Design Award.

The University of Arkansas School of Architecture Addition and Renovation in Fayetteville, Arkansas, also received a 2016 American Architecture Prize (Educational Buildings, Platinum), a 2016 National AIA — CAE Education Facility Design Award of Excellence, and the 2012 American Institute of Architects (AIA) Technology in Architectural Practice, Building Information Modeling Award for Exemplary Use of BIM in a Small Firm.

The Reels Building at Thaden School in Bentonville, Arkansas, received a 2022 National AIA — CAE Education Facility Design Award for Merit. The Lamplighter School Innovation Lab in Dallas, Texas, received a 2020 National AIA — CAE Education Facility Design Award for Design Excellence.

The Fayetteville Montessori Schools (Elementary and Primary) in Fayetteville, Arkansas, received a 2016 American Architecture Prize [Educational Buildings, Gold]. Fayetteville High School, Phase 1+2 in Fayetteville, Arkansas, received the 2016 National AIA — CAE Education Facility Design Award of Merit.

The Little Rock Creative Corridor (with the University of Arkansas Community Design Center) in Little Rock, Arkansas, received the 2014 American Society of Landscape Architects Honor Award for Analysis and Planning.

The Moore Honeyhouse in Cashiers, North Carolina, received the 2003 AR+D Award from The Architectural Review.

His work was exhibited in "Building:Community" at the 2016 Venice Biennale in Venice, Italy, alongside the work of the University of Arkansas Community Design Center.

The Keenan TowerHouse, in Fayetteville, Arkansas, was featured on the cover of the February 2001 issue of Architectural Record. The St. Nicholas Eastern Orthodox Church, in Springdale, Arkansas, was featured on the cover of the November 2011 issue of Architectural Record.

His firm was named the 2011 Firm of the Year by Residential Architect magazine. Blackwell was selected as an ID Forty: Undersung Heroes by The International Design Magazine in 2006.

=== Academia ===
Blackwell has taught at the University of Arkansas since 1992, and he has also held visiting teaching positions at several universities. During his tenure at the University of Arkansas, he was named by DesignIntelligence magazine as one of the "30 Most Admired Educators" for 2015. He has co-taught design studios with Peter Eisenman (1997 and 1998), Christopher Risher (2000), and Julie Snow (2003). Other visiting academic appointments have included the McDermott Visiting Professor at the University of Texas at Austin (2016), the George Baird Professor at Cornell University (2012), the Thomas Jefferson Professor at the University of Virginia (2011), the Elliel Saarinen Visiting Professor at the University of Michigan (2009), the Ivan Smith Distinguished Professor at the University of Florida (2009), the Paul Rudolph Visiting Professor at Auburn University (2008), the Cameron Visiting Professor at Middlebury College (2007), the Ruth and Norman Moore Visiting Professor at Washington University in St. Louis (2003), and a visiting graduate professor at the Massachusetts Institute of Technology (MIT) (2001 and 2002).

== Major works ==
=== Residential ===
- Graphic House, Fayetteville, Arkansas (2016)
- Srygley Pool House, Fayetteville, Arkansas (2014)
- L-Stack House, Fayetteville, Arkansas (2006)
- Porchdog House Prototype, Biloxi, Mississippi (2009)
- Arkansas House, Johnson, Arkansas (2004)
- Keenan TowerHouse, Fayetteville, Arkansas (2000)
- Moore HoneyHouse, Cashiers, North Carolina (1998)

=== Commercial ===
- Crystal Bridges Museum Store, Bentonville, Arkansas (2011)
- Harvey Pediatric Clinic, Rogers, Arkansas (2016)
- The Fulbright Building renovation, Fayetteville, Arkansas (2007)
- Blessings Golf Course Clubhouse, Fayetteville, Arkansas (2005)
- Srygley Office Building, Fayetteville, Arkansas (2004)

=== Institutional ===
- Thaden School (with EskewDumezRipple and Andropogon Associates), Bentonville, Arkansas (2019)
- Fayetteville High School (Arkansas) (2014)
- Ruth Lilly Visitors Pavilion, Indianapolis Museum of Art (2010)
- Saint Nicholas Orthodox Church, an Eastern Orthodox church in Springdale, Arkansas (2010)
- Gentry Public Library, Gentry, Arkansas (2008)
- Northwest Arkansas Free Health Center, Fayetteville, Arkansas (2013)
- All Saints Episcopal Church, Bentonville, Arkansas (in design development)
- Montessori Elementary and Primary Schools, Fayetteville, Arkansas (2012, 2014)
- Vol Walker Hall renovation, incorporating the Steven L. Anderson Design Center addition, University of Arkansas, Fayetteville, Arkansas (2013)
- The Lamplighter School Innovation Lab and Barn, Dallas, Texas (2017)

=== Urban ===
- Creative Corridor (with University of Arkansas Community Design Center), Little Rock, Arkansas (2012)
- Buildings at Shelby Farms Park (with James Corner Field Operations, landscape architect), Memphis, Tennessee (2016)
