= Thumping Dick Hollow =

Cove in Tennessee, United States

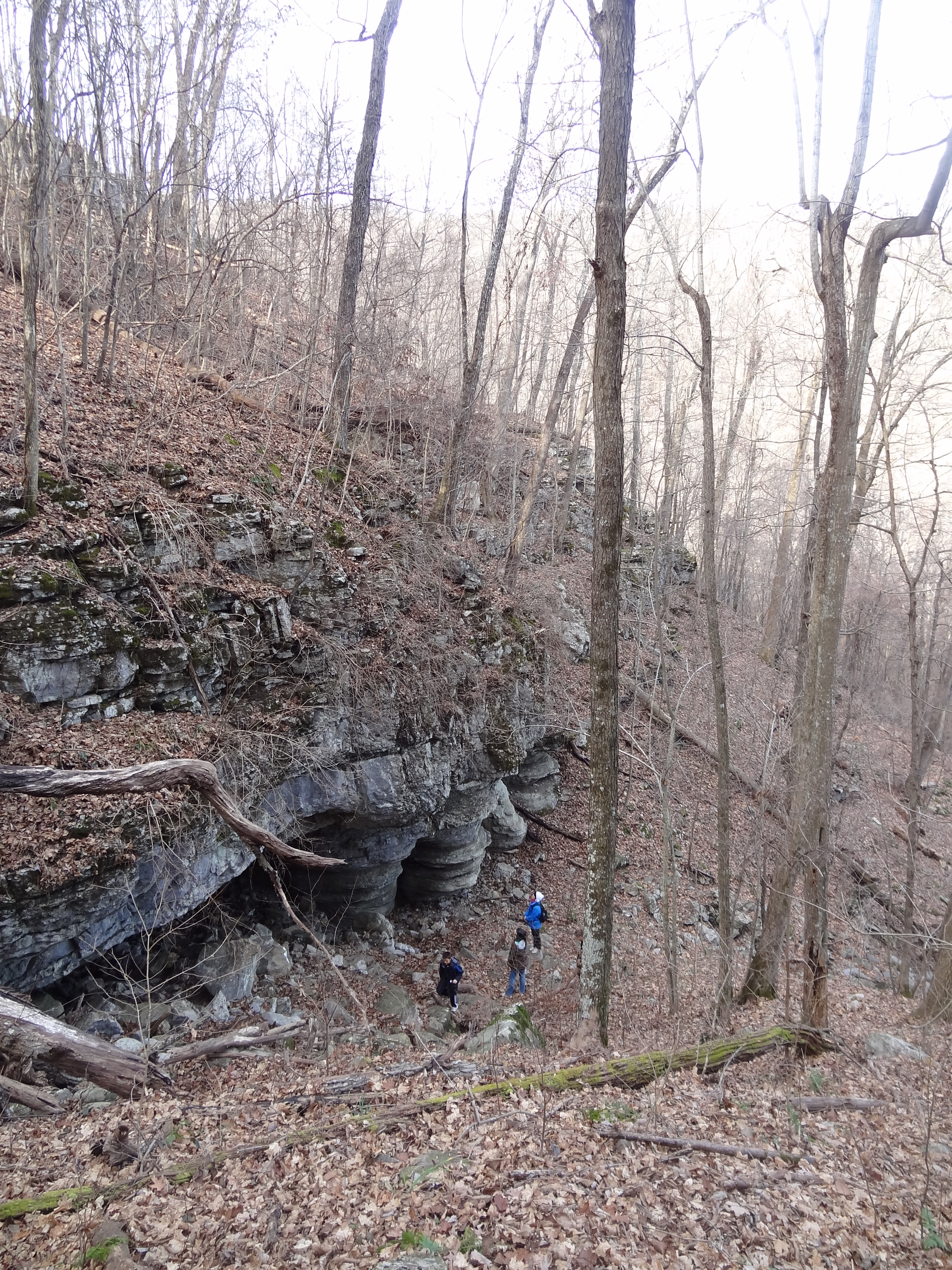
- No-Name Cave

- Location within Tennessee
- Length: 2 miles (3.2 km) East-West
- Width: 0.1 to 1 mile (0.16 to 1.61 km)

Geography
- Location: Franklin County, Tennessee, United States
- Coordinates: 35°13′40.22″N 85°57′19.41″W
- Traversed by: Sewanee Perimeter Trail
- Interactive map of Thumping Dick Hollow

Thumping Dick Hollow, also known as Thumping Dick Cove, is a small cove in Franklin County, south Tennessee, within the domain of the University of the South and town of Sewanee. It is noted for its unusual name, old-growth forest, and caves.

== Description ==
Thumping Dick Hollow is a small cove with multiple sinkholes and caves including Solomon's Temple. It is also noted for its old growth forest. It is one of the segments of the Sewanee Perimeter Trail. In 1973, Dick Cove was designated as a National Natural Landmark by the National Park Service.

== Origin of name ==
There are multiple traditions as to the origin of the unusual name. The hollow was referred to as early as 1858 before the University of the South was built. A popular version relates that a local resident named "Dick" built a water-powered grain mill in the 19th century; when in operation, the mill made a "thumping" sound that was heard throughout the surrounding forest. Another version of the origin states that the a hydro powered sump pump or sawmill made a thumping sound when in operation.

== Location ==
Thumping Dick Hollow located off of the old Stagecoach route of the Breakfield Road in Sewanee, Tennessee and forms part of the Sewanee Perimeter Trail. It is approximately 700 feet (210 m) in elevation below Breakfield Road. From gate #7 on Breakfield Road, follow the path beyond the gate for .8 miles (1.3 km) until it crosses a stream with a collapsed bridge. Cross over the stream and follow a faint path to the left until the entrance to the Columned Entrance Cave is visible. The second cave, Solomon's Temple, is further ahead around the cliff on the right.

== In literature ==
Noted early 20th century New England author, drama critic, and Yale professor Walter Prichard Eaton wrote of the hollow. In his 1922 collection of essays Penguin, Persons, and Peppermints, Eaton describes a visit to the hollow in early spring while celebrating the Southern American gift for colorful place names.

== Gallery ==
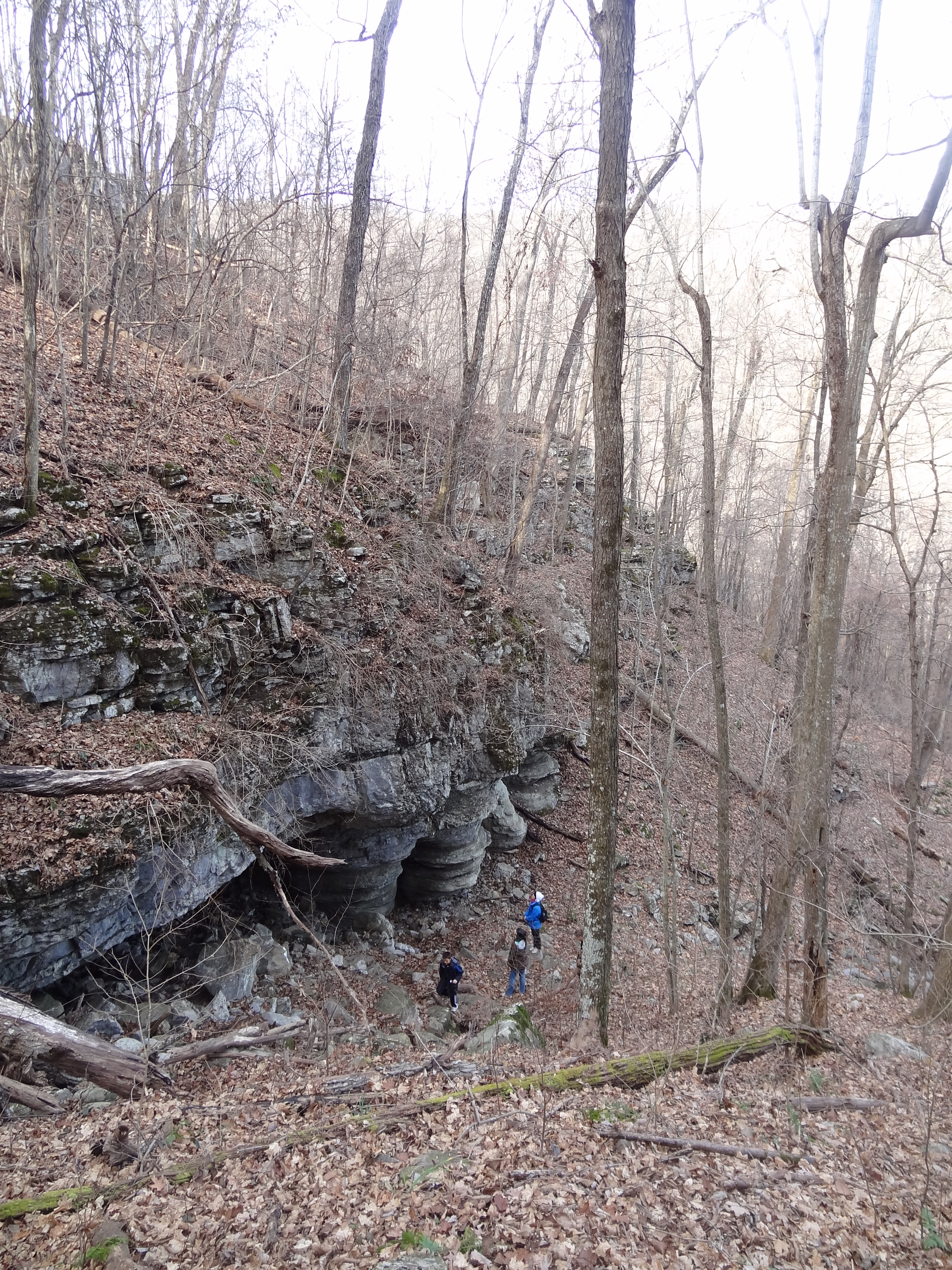
No-Name Cave

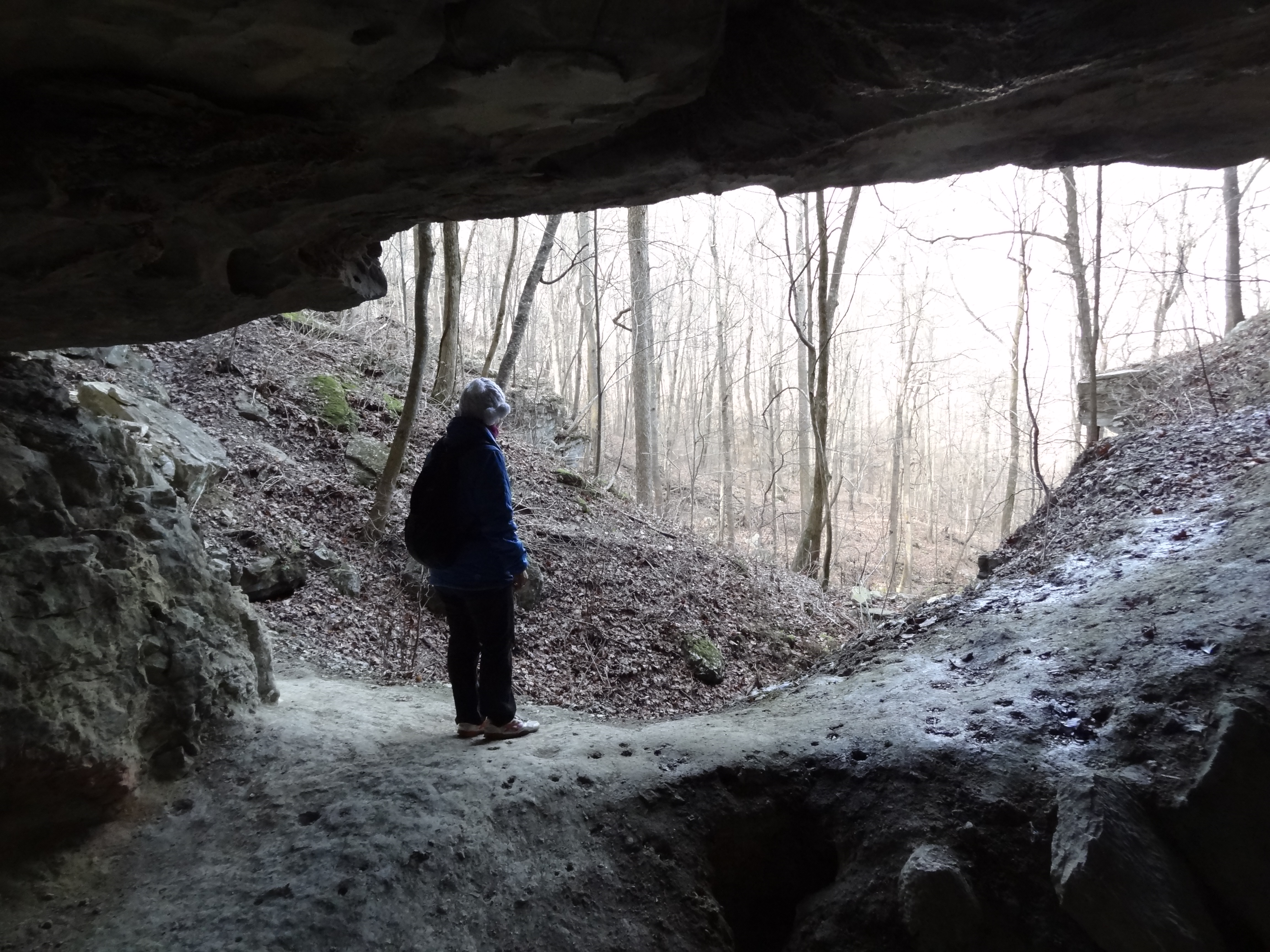
No-Name Cave Interior

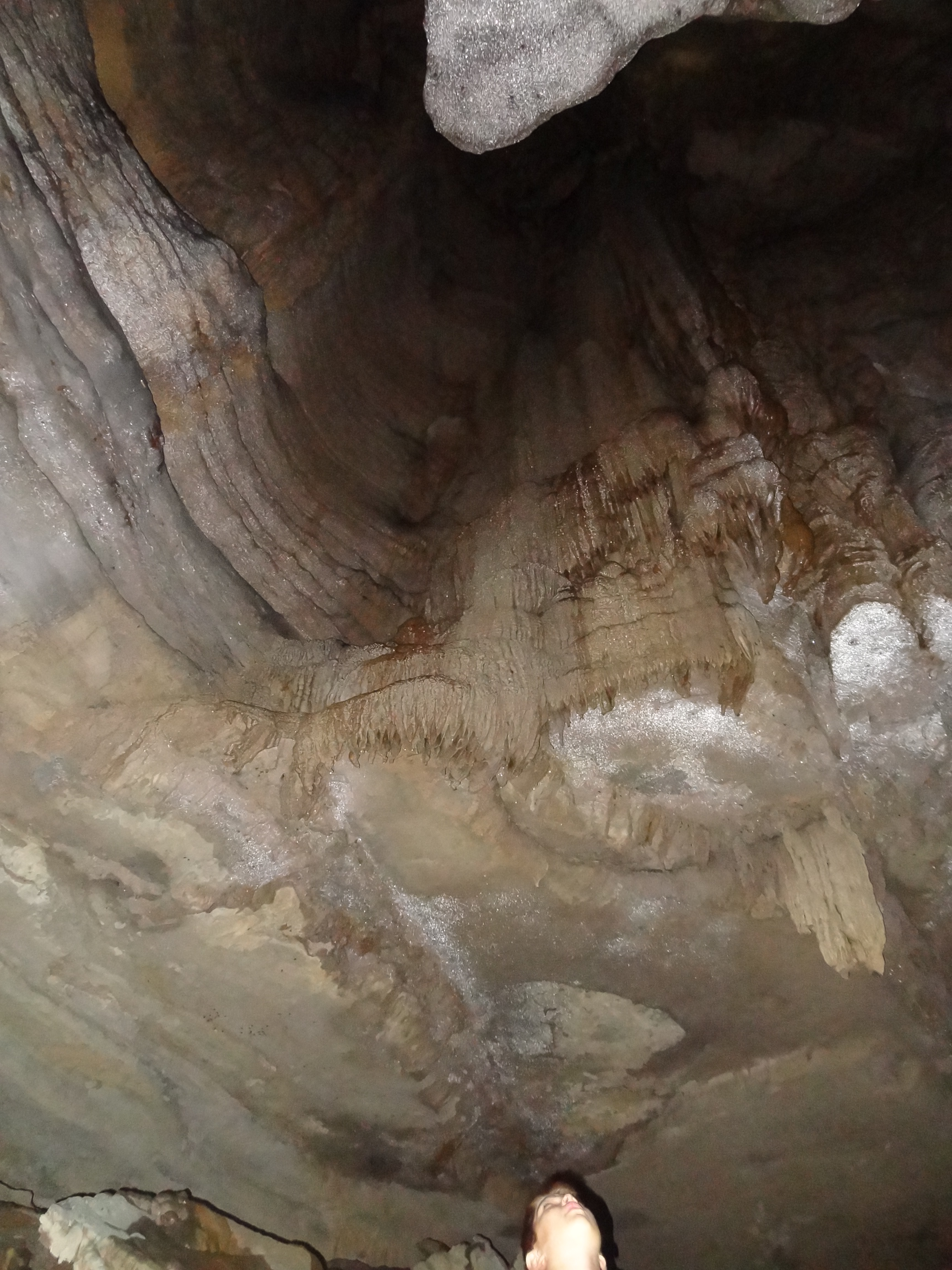
No-Name Cave Interior Dome

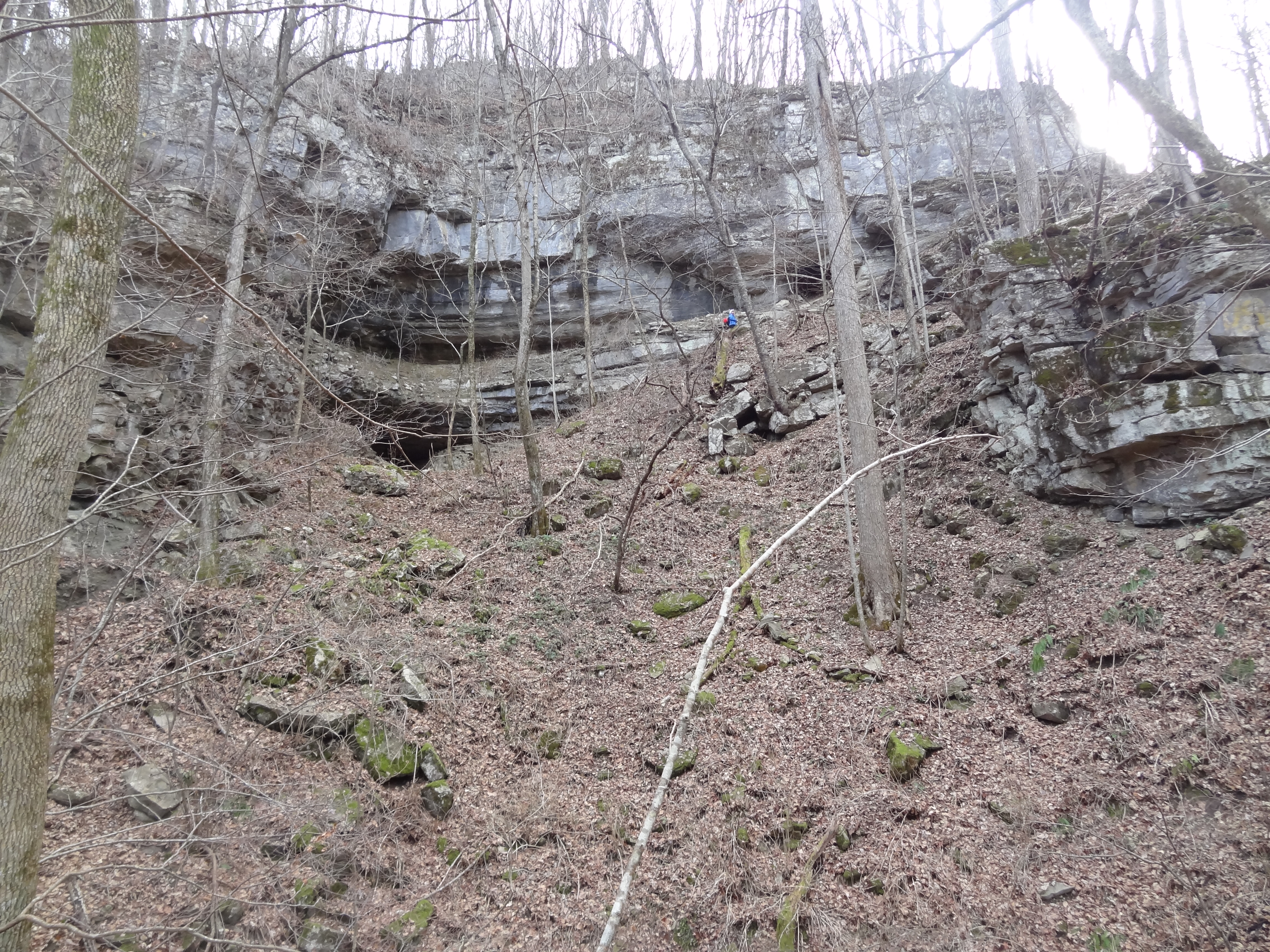
Cliff Towards Solomon's Temple Cliff

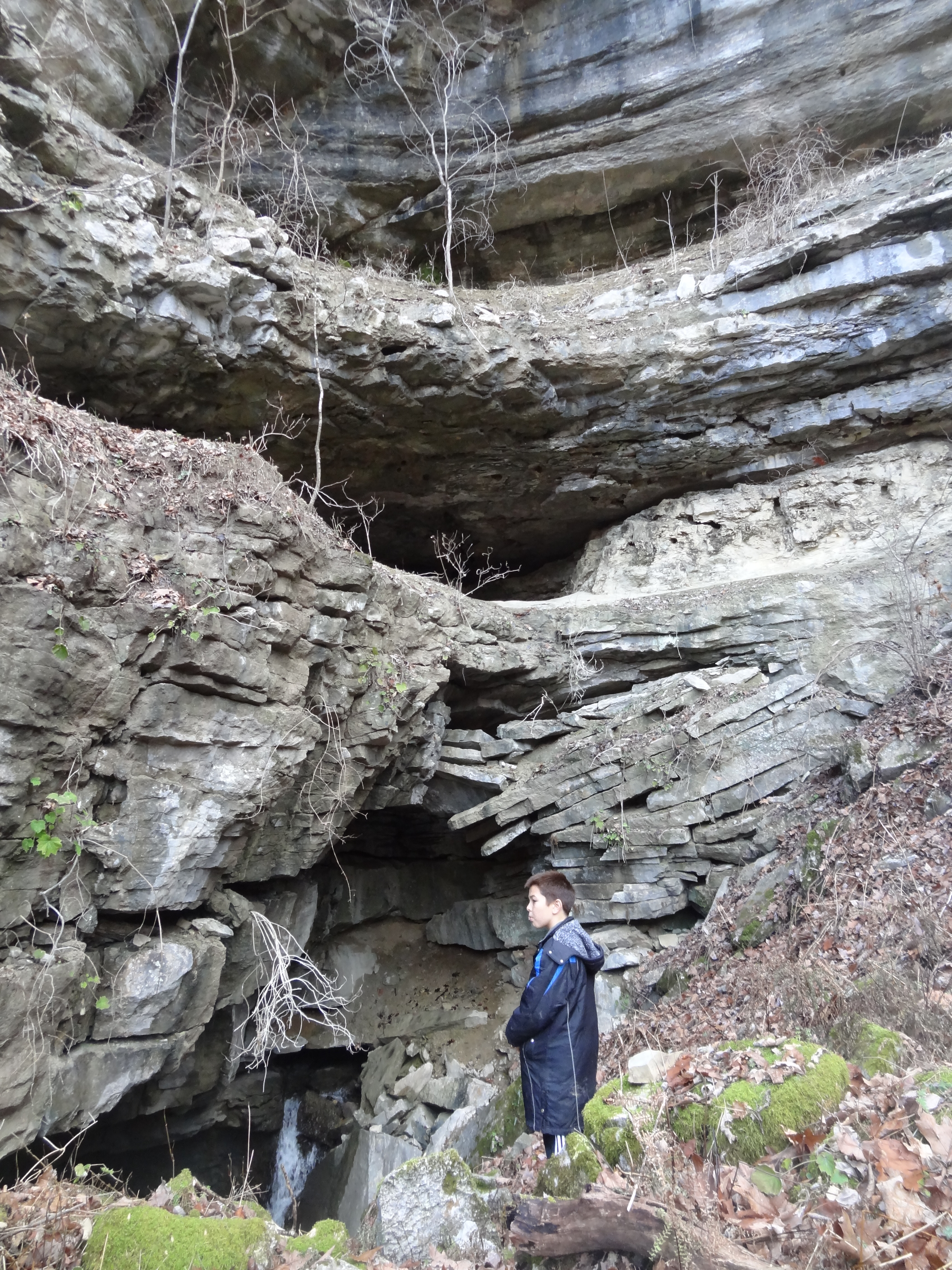
Waterfall below Solomon's Temple Cave

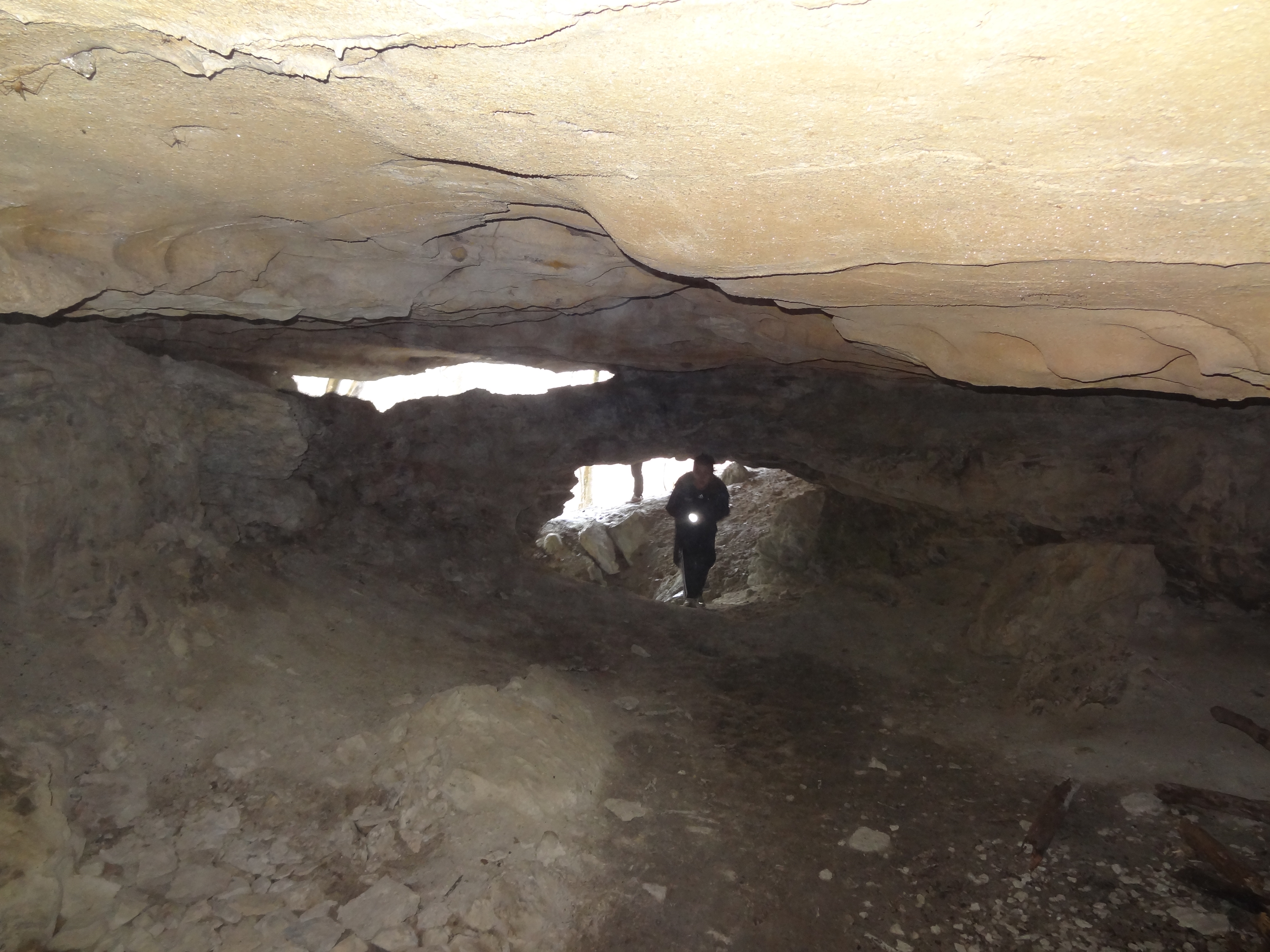
Solomon's Temple Cave Entrance Interior

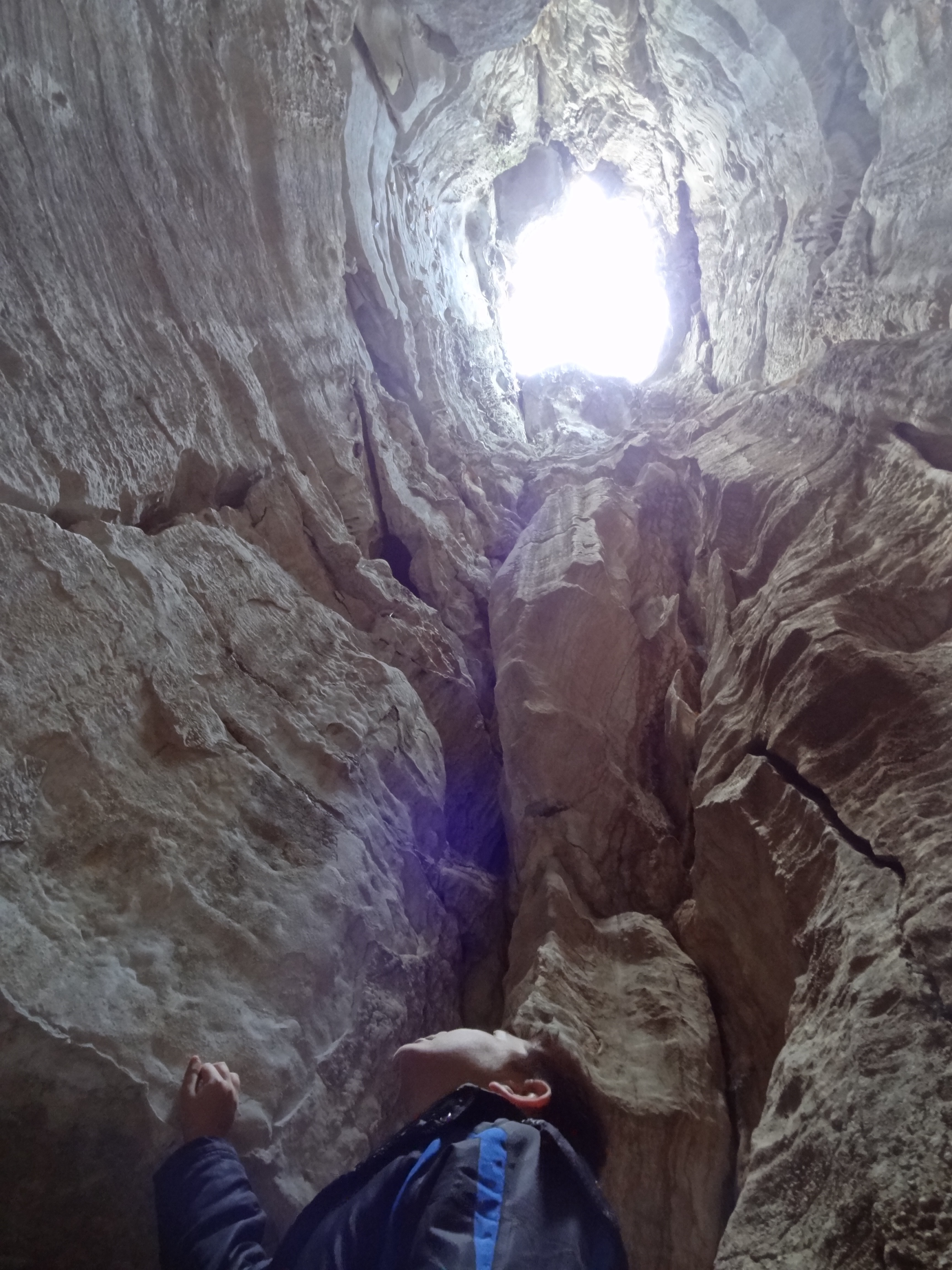
A sinkhole looking up

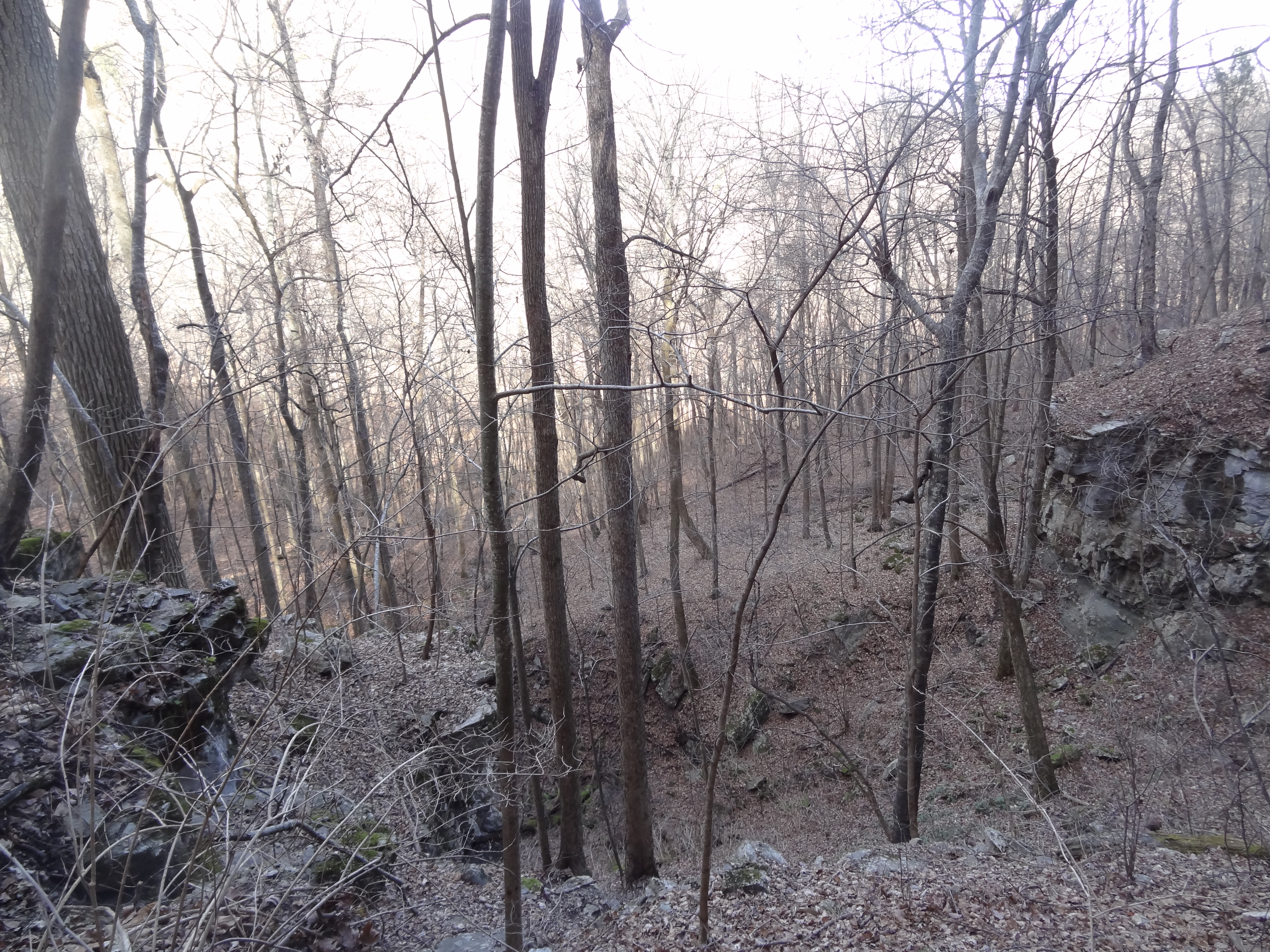
Collapsed Sinkhole below Solomon's Temple Cave
