= Crosby Arboretum =

Arboretum in Picayune, Mississippi, United States

Coordinates: 30.5036°N 89.6662°W

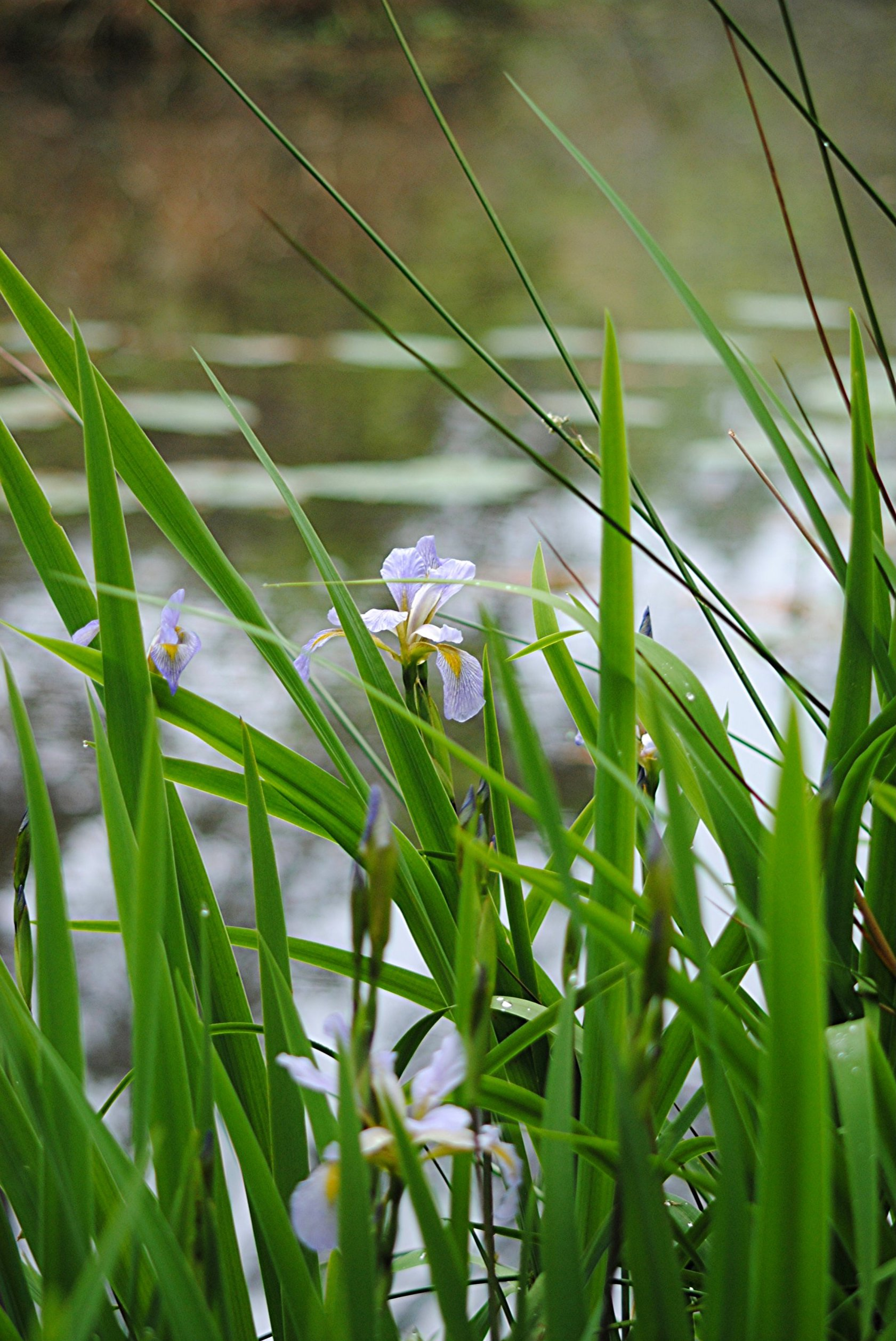
- A pond-side iris at the arboretum.
- Interactive map of Crosby Arboretum

The Crosby Arboretum is located in Picayune, Mississippi, United States, and is affiliated with Mississippi State University. It contains 64 acres (259,000 m^{2}) in its interpretive center, plus over 700 acres (2.8 km^{2}) in seven additional natural areas, sheltering over 300 species of indigenous trees and shrubs.

== History and landscape ==
The Arboretum project was initiated by Lynn Crosby Gammill and her husband Stewart Gammill along with her brother Osmond Crosby to honor their father, L. O. Crosby, Jr. (1907–1978), by conserving the region's biological diversity and showcasing plants native to the Pearl River drainage basin. The seven natural areas in Pearl River, Hancock, and Lamar counties were selected for diversity of vegetation, and are preserved and managed for research. These areas contain longleaf pine forests, slash pine hardwoods, sweet bay-tupelo-swamp bay, beech-magnolia, bald cypress-tupelo, bottomland hardwoods, hillside bogs, and savannas.

- Hillside Bog – 70 acres (283,000 m^{2}) of highly diverse habitat in northern Hancock County, including a hillside bog, longleaf pine, sweetbay-tupelo-swampbay, and longleaf pine-scrub oak.
- Dead Tiger Creek Hammock – 20 acres (81,000 m^{2}) of a low, non-alluvial, hardwood swamp, home to a variety of species including Coreopsis nudata and Macranthera flammea.
- Dead Tiger Creek Savanna – 20 acres (81,000 m^{2}) including a pine ridge, sloping bog area with several pitcher plant bogs that contain orchids and insect eating plants, and a flat savanna, containing most of the Mississippi holly species and 2 species of pitcher plant.
- Red Bluff – 320 acres (1.3 km^{2}) along Catahoula Creek, with a clear-water stream, sandy white beaches, oxbow lakes, titi-lined creek banks, open sandy areas, gum swamps, and dry pine woods.
- Talowah – 120 acres (486,000 m^{2}) of longleaf pine ridges, maintained by periodic burning, with hardwoods along the branch bottoms.
- Mill Creek – 20 acres (81,000 m^{2}) of mature beech-magnolia woodland. All five species of magnolia in the state are found here, as are beech, southern magnolia, swampbay, spruce pine, and yellow-poplar.
- Steep Hollow – A diverse and species-rich area with quaking bogs, longleaf pine slopes and ridges, and sweetbay-tupelo-swampbay areas.

== Pinecote Pavilion ==
The Arboretum is home to the Pinecote Pavilion designed by the late E. Fay Jones. Jones was an apprentice to Frank Lloyd Wright and followed many of Wright's design principles. The pavilion is one of the architectural jewels of Mississippi.

In 1991, Pinecote Pavilion has received an Honor award from the American Institute of Architects and secured Jones to win the AIA Gold Medal. Pinecote, the 64-acre Interpretive Center, was sensitively designed by consultants Andropogon Associates and site master planner Edward L. Blake, Jr. The design for Pinecote received a 1991 Honor award from the American Society of Landscape Architects (ASLA) and an ASLA Medallion Award (1999). Pinecote features walking journeys through 20 acres of biologically-enhanced savanna exhibits, 40 acres of woodland succession, and nearly 4 acres of created waterways.

== See also ==
- List of botanical gardens in the United States
