= Vol Walker Hall =

- Vol Walker Library-University of Arkansas, Fayetteville
- U.S. National Register of Historic Places
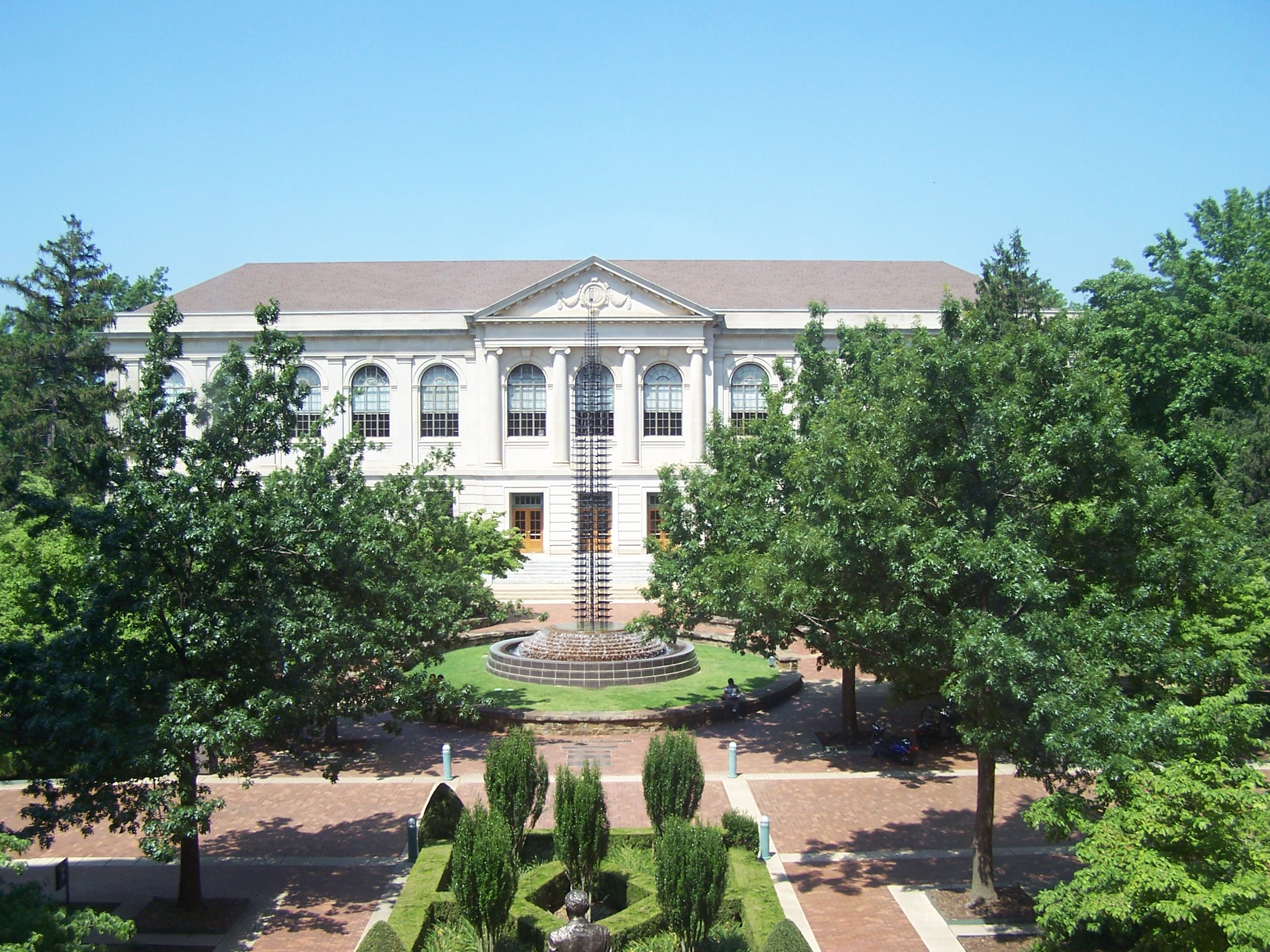
- Vol Walker Hall as viewed from Old Main

- Location within Arkansas Location within the United States
- Location: Campus Dr., Fayetteville, Arkansas
- Coordinates: 36°04′07″N 94°10′22″W
- Area: 2.8 acres (1.1 ha)
- Built: 1935
- Architect: John Milner Associates, Inc.
- Architectural style: Colonial Revival, Classical Revival, Other, Georgian Revival
- MPS: Public Schools in the Ozarks MPS
- NRHP reference No.: 92001105
- Added to NRHP: September 4, 1992

Vol Walker Hall (earlier Vol Walker Library) is a building on the University of Arkansas campus in Fayetteville, Arkansas. It contains the Fay Jones School of Architecture and Design. The structure was added to the National Register of Historic Places in 1992.

== Eponym ==
The University of Arkansas Board of Trustees changed the name to honor James Volney "Vol" Walker in the spring of 1934. An 1877 University of Arkansas alumnus, respected lawyer, and member of the Arkansas legislature, Walker was instrumental in keeping the University in Fayetteville despite efforts to move it.

== History ==
Vol Walker Hall was born when University President John C. Futrall decided to utilize Public Works Administration funds available to the University of Arkansas to build a new library. Planning for the new library (and also a new science building) began in March 1931. A similar library at the University of Rochester was used as a blueprint, and eventually Futrall brought in the original designers of the Rochester library, Gordon and Kaehler.

The hall contained the University library from 1935 until 1968, when it was supplanted by Mullins Library. It was at this time that the name was changed to Vol Walker Hall.

== Expansion ==
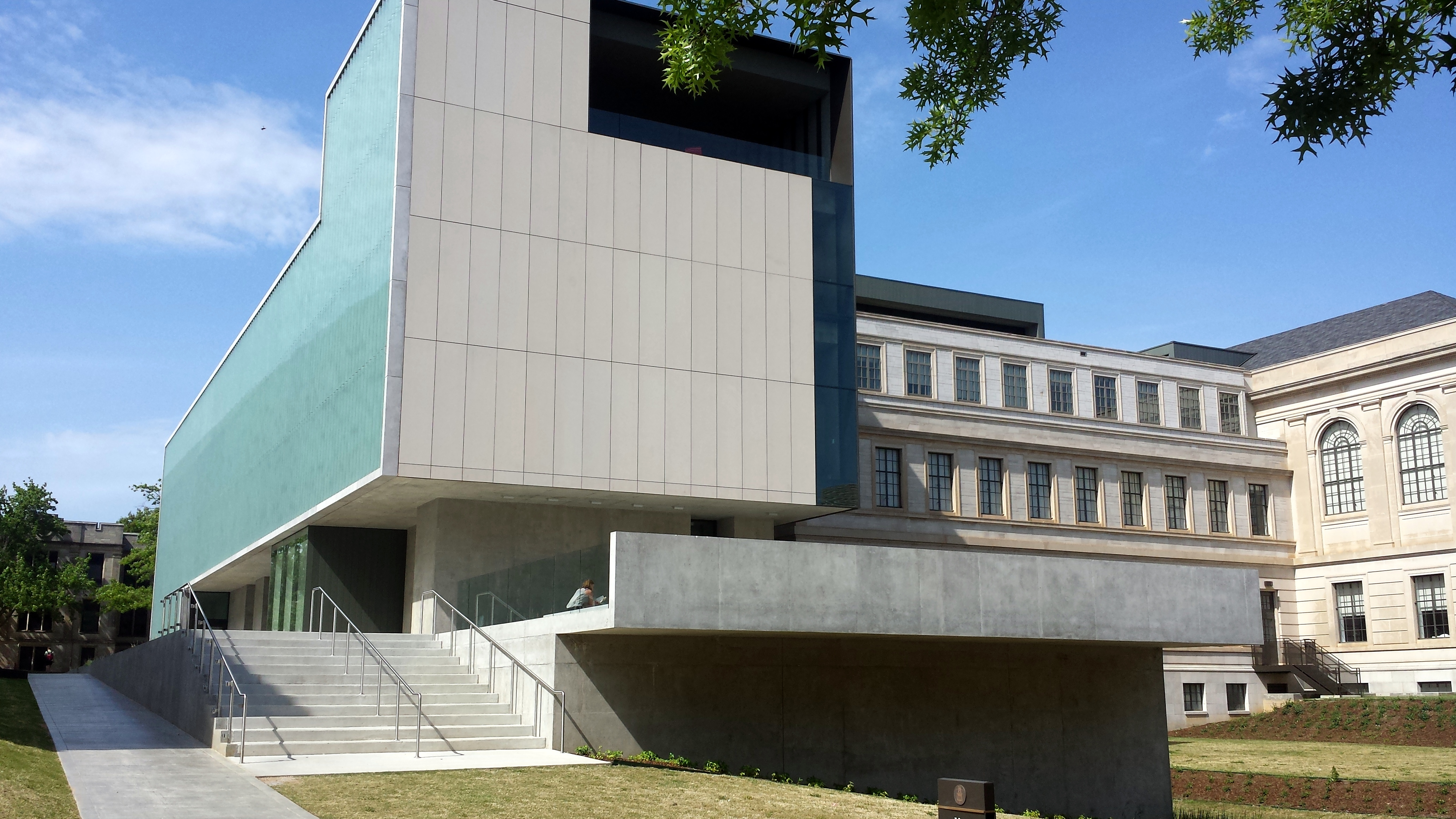
Steven L. Anderson Design Center

A two-year renovation and expansion of Vol Walker Hall was completed in 2013, culminating in the new Steven L. Anderson Design Center being attached to the historic structure. The design center added 37,000 square feet (3,400 m^{2}) of studio, faculty, and classroom space and allows the Fay Jones School of Architecture and Design to be entirely housed under one roof for the first time. Designed by the School of Architecture's Distinguished Professor Marlon Blackwell, the expansion has received several awards in the architecture community, including a 2018 American Institute of Architects Honor Award for Architecture, a 2014 American Institute of Architects (AIA) Gulf States Honor Award and Architects Newspaper's Building of the Year.

== See also ==
- National Register of Historic Places listings in Washington County, Arkansas
