= John B. Begley Chapel =

Begley Chapel
- John B. Begley Chapel
- Exterior of the chapel

- Location in Kentucky Begley Chapel (the United States)
- 37°6′10″N 85°18′0″W
- Country: United States
- Website: www.lindsey.edu/about-lwc/john-b-begley-chapel.cfm

History
- Status: Open
- Founder: Lindsey Wilson College
- Dedicated: October 10, 1997

Architecture
- Architect: Fay Jones
- Groundbreaking: November 16, 1996

Specifications
- Width: 44 feet (13 m)
- Height: 60 feet (18 m)
- Materials: Brick, steel, glass, wood

John B. Begley Chapel is a chapel located on the campus of Lindsey Wilson College in Columbia, Kentucky designed by architect E. Fay Jones, completed in 1997. Jones' design was inspired by agricultural forms common to the surrounding area.

== Architecture ==
Jones designed two adjacent cylindrical spaces linked by an arched brick tunnel. Both windowless brick cylinders are capped by steel and glass covers termed "crowns" by Jones. An 800-pound curved Ozark red oak door serves as the entry, set into a stepped brick door jamb. Kentucky contractor James N. Gray Company built the structure which was funded by an anonymous $2 million donation.

Interior view of the chapel

At an event celebrating its 20th anniversary, the chapel was described as “...a beautiful and unusual, symmetrical work of architecture that captures your eyes from the outside. Then if you walk on the inside, you find out there are no windows -- so it raises your gaze up to the heavens so that you can look to God.”

== See also ==
- Thorncrown Chapel (1980), designed by Jones in Eureka Springs, Arkansas
- Mildred B. Cooper Memorial Chapel (1988), designed by Jones in Bella Vista, Arkansas
