= Sewanee Perimeter Trail =

Coordinates: 35.191859°N 85.936802°W

- Length: 20 miles (32 km)
- Location: Sewanee, Tennessee
- Trailheads: Sewanee War Memorial Cross, Lake Cheston, Green's View, and the Sewanee University Gates
- Use: Hiking, Trail Biking, Jogging, Camping
- Difficulty: Easy to Moderate
- Season: All Year
- Sights: Thumping Dick Cove, Sewanee War Memorial Cross, Green's View, Morgan's Steep
- Hazards: Tick-borne diseases Mosquitos; Yellowjackets; Chiggers; Steep grades Poison ivy Venomous snakes
- Website: Sewanee Perimeter Trail

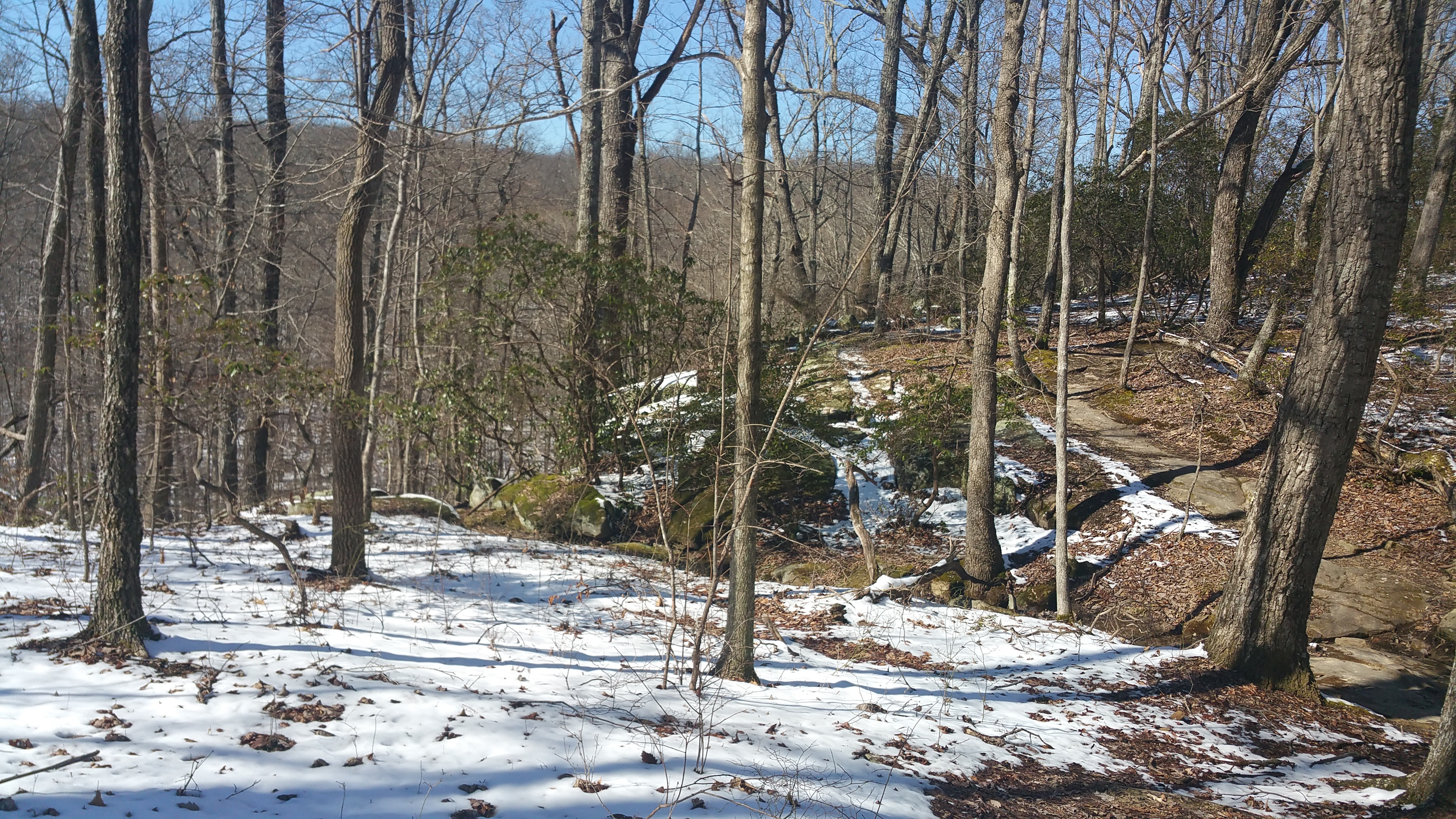
Snow on the Sewanee Perimeter Trail

The Sewanee Perimeter Trail is a private mixed-use mountain top trail of 20 miles (32 km) owned and maintained by the University of the South in Sewanee, TN.

== Description ==
The trail follows the perimeter of the Cumberland Plateau bluff line and encircles the campus of the University of the South. It is open for use by students, faculty, and alumni of the University as well as local residents of Sewanee. The trail includes mixed use sections appropriate for hiking, running, and mountain biking as well as sections that are for hiking only.

=== Designated Trails ===
It consists of ten designated hiking trails:

1. Cross/Perimeter Trail/Tennessee Williams: 1.25 miles (2.01 km) loop
2. The Cross to Morgan's Steep: 1 mile (1.6 km) one way
3. Bridal Veil Falls: 2 miles (3.2 km) round trip
4. Elliott Point/Parallel Trail: 3.5 miles (5.6 km) loop
5. Western Section Perimeter: 7.5 miles (12.1 km) one way
6. Forestry Cabin/Dotson Point: 4.5 miles (7.2 km) loop
7. Thumping Dick Cove: 2 miles (3.2 km) round trip
8. Cedar Hollow Lake: 2 miles (3.2 km) loop
9. Shakerag/Beckwith's Point: 3.5 miles (5.6 km) loop
10. Piney Point: 2 miles (3.2 km) round trip

=== Access Points ===
Access points on the trail include the Memorial Cross, Lake Cheston, Green's View, and the University Gates. At each access point are signs noting the hiking and camping policies of the property. Since the University property is private, all visitors must abide by stated policies.
