= All Saints' Chapel (Sewanee) =

University chapel in Sewanee, Tennessee, US

- The north side of All Saints' Chapel
- All Saints' Chapel
- 35°12′14″N 85°55′12″W
- Location: Sewanee, Tennessee
- Country: United States
- Denomination: Episcopal Church
- Website: sewanee.edu/campus-life/believing/all-saints-chapel/

History
- Dedicated: 1959
- Consecrated: 1975

Architecture
- Architect(s): Ralph Adams Cram, Edward McCrady, Ayers and Godwin
- Style: Gothic Revival
- Years built: 1904–59
- Groundbreaking: 1904
- Completed: 1959
- Construction cost: US$1.45 million ($16 million in 2025)

Specifications
- Capacity: 1,400
- Length: 233 feet (71 m)
- Width: 63 feet (19 m)
- Height: 61 feet (19 m) (roof); 134 feet (41 m) (tower)
- Materials: Sandstone

Clergy
- Dean: The Very Rev. Christopher L. Epperson

All Saints' Chapel is the primary campus chapel of Sewanee: The University of the South in Sewanee, Tennessee. Based on chapels and churches at the University of Oxford, was designed by Ralph Adams Cram in 1904. Construction began that year but paused in 1907 when funds ran out. The unfinished chapel was used for multiple daily services from 1910 until 1954, when construction resumed. The chapel and its bell tower were finished in 1959.

The Gothic Revival structure was built of load-bearing local sandstone without the use of structural steel and concrete. It includes a bell tower with 56 bells, a large rose window in the church's west end, and seating for 1,400 worshipers and choristers. Stained glass windows depict scenes from the Bible, images representing the arts and sciences and scenes from Sewanee history. The Gothic Revival architecture and the chapel's place in the university's central quadrangle contribute to Sewanee's reputation as a "Little Oxford".

The chapel is used for regular Anglican worship services, musical performances and university commencement ceremonies. It was the subject of controversy over Confederate imagery from the 1990s through 2021, during which period Confederate flags and symbols were successively removed from the chapel.

== History ==
A chapel was planned at the site of the University of the South on Monteagle Mountain prior to its actual founding, and a six-ton cornerstone was laid at the planned site in 1860. The outbreak of the Civil War stopped construction, and the cornerstone was demolished during the war. After the war, St. Augustine's Chapel was built in 1867–68 in time for the university's opening as an Episcopal Church–affiliated university. It was enlarged nine times over the next 42 years until it was demolished once services moved to All Saints' Chapel.

In 1904, the university commissioned Ralph Adams Cram, one of the leading Gothic Revival architects in the United States, to design a new chapel in that style. All Saints' Chapel's cornerstone was placed in 1905, just north of the location of St. Augustine's Chapel. By 1907, when the outer walls had risen to the clerestory level, construction abruptly stopped following the failure of the bank that held the funds for the chapel during the Panic of 1907. A temporary wooden roof was installed over the unfinished walls in 1910, and the university used the chapel in that state. Between 1910 and 1957, the chapel became known as the busiest Episcopal church in the South with over 600 services each year by the 1950s.

Sewanee professor Edward McCrady drew sketches for the completion of the chapel in 1937. McCrady became the university's vice-chancellor in 1951, and construction resumed in 1954, with the Atlanta firm of Ayers and Godwin producing the construction drawings for the remaining work. The 1,400-seat chapel was completed in 1959 at a cost of $1.45 million ($16 million in 2025). All Saints' was completed as part of a broader and ambitious 1950s building program at Sewanee connected with the school's centennial. The chapel began its popular annual presentation of the Festival of Nine Lessons and Carols in 1959.

All Saints' Chapel was consecrated in October 1975 following the repayment of its construction debt. Around 1990, sealant was applied to porous stone inside the church, resulting in perfect acoustics. Archbishop of Canterbury George Carey visited All Saints' Chapel in 1999.

In the 1990s, the chapel was part of efforts by Sewanee to remove visual elements of the university's past associations with the Confederate States of America. In the mid-1990s, the chapel removed the flags of several southern states—including state flags that included the Confederate battle flag—and in 1997, a mace used in chapel ceremonies that included the Confederate flag vanished after being damaged. It was found in 2005 but was not repaired. In 2021, Sewanee revised a stained glass window panel showing two bishops, one carrying a Confederate flag and the other an American flag, to remove the flags.

== Architecture ==
West end and narthex with rose window

All Saints' Chapel is situated on the southern side of Sewanee's main quadrangle. A cloister connects the chapel with Walsh-Ellet Hall, the main administration building, on the opposite side. The quadrangle was completed in 1965 with a cloister connecting Walsh-Ellet, Carnegie, and Guerry halls with the Cleveland annex and All Saints' Chapel. The chapel was constructed almost completely from local sandstone, and the stone was load-bearing, without use of steel or concrete reinforcement.

Shapard Tower includes the 56-bell Leonidas Polk Memorial Carillon

It was designed in Cram's signature Gothic Revival style. A crenellated parapet and two towers mark the narthex. The west end of the church is marked by a large rose window inspired by those of Notre Dame in Paris. The vaulted ceilings were based on the French cathedrals at Chartres and Amiens. On the south side near the chapel's crossing is a 134-foot (41 m) tower that incorporates elements from 15th-century towers in Britain and U.S. Collegiate Gothic towers from the early 20th century. The tower, modified by McCrady from Cram's design, is modeled on the University Church of St Mary the Virgin in Oxford. Shapard Tower houses the Leonidas Polk Memorial Carillon with 56 bells of a combined weight of 23 short tons (21 t), with the largest bell weighing 7,500 pounds (3,400 kg). The carillon has a five-octave range.

The exterior of the chapel measures 233 feet (71 m) in length and 63 feet (19 m) in width, with the chapel's roof (separate from the tower) reaching 61 feet (19 m) from the ground. The interior of the chapel spans 212 feet (65 m) from the west wall to the high altar, and the width of the nave proper is 35 feet (11 m). The height to the ceiling is 51 feet (16 m). The chapel seats 1,250 in the nave and an additional 150 in the chancel.

Nave of All Saints' Chapel

Stained glass windows in the clerestory and aisles were completed in the 1950s. They depict biblical scenes as well as figures from the arts and sciences. Four large stained-glass windows in the narthex display scenes from the history of the university up to the 1950s, including the Civil Rights Movement and a Volkswagen Beetle. All but three windows were produced by English firm J. Wippell & Co. Two windows were produced by George Payne of New Jersey, while the tower vestibule window was made by Geissler in New York. A Confederate seal was removed from one of the narthex windows in 2019.

Stones were donated by historic British churches for All Saints' Chapel. A stone from Iona Abbey is inlaid in the high altar; a piece of ancient stone from the Henry VII Chapel was donated by the dean and chapter of Westminster Abbey and is in the north wall; and a white marble stone from Canterbury is placed in the south wall. All Saints' Chapel includes a smaller St. Augustine's Chapel, named in honor of the university's earlier chapel building and that includes several pieces of liturgical furniture from the earlier chapel.

== Organ ==
The nave, nave organ and rose window viewed from the chancel

The chapel's main organ, installed in 1961, is a Casavant Frères Op. 2654. The organ is located in two chambers on either side of the chancel and was rebuilt in 2003–04 to improve its sound. The nave organ is located in a case at the base of the rose window in the west end. Both organs are playable from a three-manual electric console.

== Reception ==
The chapel has been recognized as a central part of Sewanee's identity as an American "Little Oxford". After a lecture visit, historian Arnold J. Toynbee wrote in the London Observer: "If the English visitor happens to have an Anglican background, he will find the atmosphere at Sewanee familiar and congenial; but he does not need to be Anglican or English to find this university interesting."

== Programs ==
All Saints' Chapel is known for its music program, including a popular Festival of Nine Lessons and Carols. The limited number of public tickets for Lessons and Carols are claimed immediately. The chapel is used for Sewanee's commencement ceremonies.

== See also ==
- Chapel of the Apostles
