= Sewanee: The University of the South =

Private university in Sewanee, Tennessee, US

Coordinates: 35°12′11″N 85°55′11″W

The University of the South
- Latin: Universitas Meridiana
- Motto: Ecce quam bonum et quam iucundum habitare fratres in unum. (Latin, from Psalm 133)
- Motto in English: Behold how good and how pleasant it is for brethren to dwell together in unity!
- Type: Private
- Established: 1857; 169 years ago
- Religious affiliation: Episcopal Church
- Academic affiliations: CIC; NAICU; Annapolis Group; Oberlin Group; CLAC; ACS
- Endowment: $517.6 million (2025)
- Chancellor: Jacob Wayne Owensby
- Vice-Chancellor: Robert W. Pearigen
- Undergraduates: 1,695
- Postgraduates: 73
- Location: Sewanee, Tennessee, U.S.
- Campus: Rural, 13,000 acres (5,300 ha)
- Colors: Purple and gold
- Nickname: Tigers
- Sporting affiliations: NCAA Division III – SAA
- Website: sewanee.edu
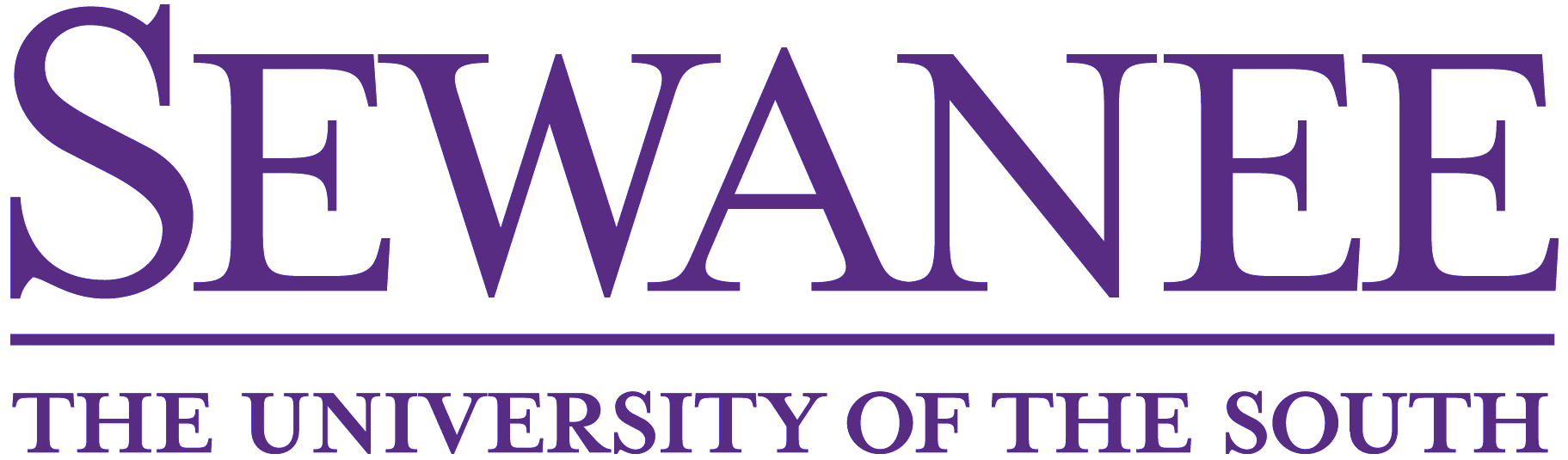

The University of the South, familiarly known as Sewanee (/səˈwɑːni/), is a private Episcopal liberal arts college in Sewanee, Tennessee, United States. It is owned by 28 southern dioceses of the Episcopal Church, and its School of Theology is an official seminary of the church. The campus (officially called "The Domain" or, affectionately, "The Mountain") consists of 13,000 acres (53 km^{2}) of scenic mountain property atop the Cumberland Plateau, with the developed portion occupying about 1,000 acres (4.0 km^{2}).

== History ==
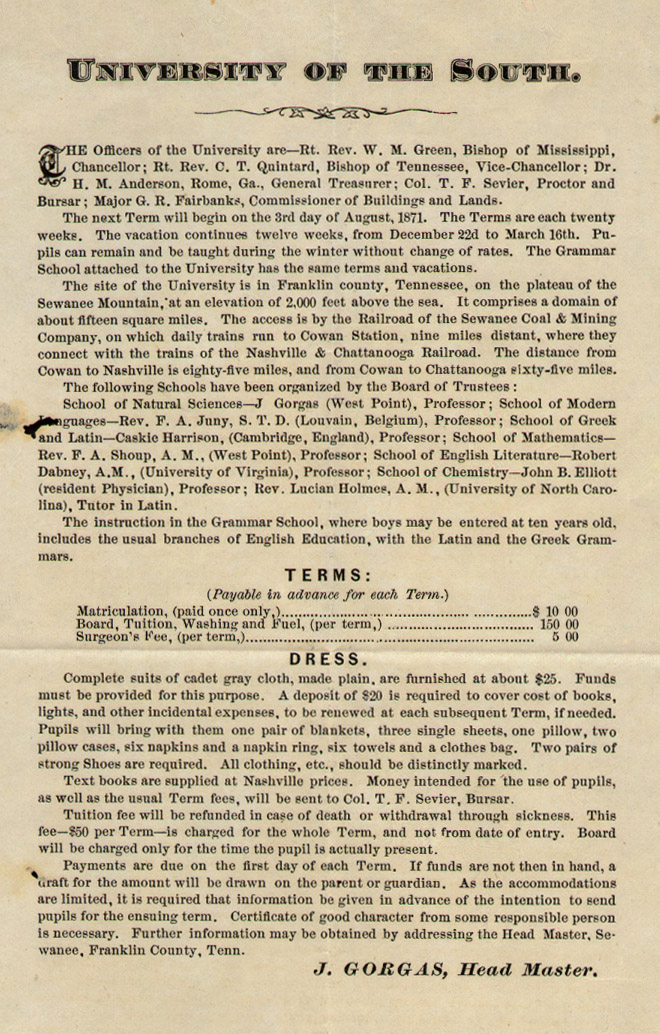
1871 Poster for Sewanee

Beginning in the 1830s, Bishop James Otey of Tennessee led an effort to found an Episcopal seminary in the Deep South. Following the Mexican War, the Episcopal Church saw tremendous growth in the region; and a real need for an institution "to train natives, for natives" – as Otey put it – arose. Up to that point, only the Virginia Theological Seminary in Alexandria, Virginia, existed south of the Mason–Dixon line, and other denominations were already establishing schools in the region. The location was chosen primarily because of the proximity to the major railway hub of Chattanooga, Tennessee, and the existing railroad spur up the mountain, the "Mountain Goat", which ran from 1858 until April 1985. Bishop Leonidas Polk commented that, due to the access to railroads, one could reach any point in the South from Sewanee within thirty-six to forty-eight hours.

On July 4, 1857, delegates from ten Southern dioceses of the Episcopal Church in the United States—Alabama, Arkansas, Florida, Georgia, Louisiana, Mississippi, North Carolina, South Carolina, Tennessee, and Texas—were led up Monteagle Mountain by Polk for the founding of their denominational college for the region. The goal was to create a Southern university free of Northern influences. As Otey put it: the new university will "materially aid the South to resist and repel a fanatical domination which seeks to rule over us." The majority of the land for the university was donated by the Sewanee Mining Company on the condition that a university "be put in operation within ten years". The company's early profits were derived from the labor of mainly African-American convict leasing. John Armfield, co-founder of Franklin & Armfield, "the largest slave trading firm" in the United States, was the largest single donor involved in the founding of the university.

The six-ton marble cornerstone, laid on October 10th, 1860, and consecrated by Polk, was blown up in 1863 by Union soldiers; many of the pieces were collected and kept as keepsakes by the soldiers. A few were donated back to the university, and a large fragment was eventually installed in a wall of All Saints' Chapel. Several figures later prominent in the Confederacy, notably Polk, Bishop Stephen Elliott, Jr., and Bishop James Hervey Otey, were founders of the university. Generals Edmund Kirby Smith, Josiah Gorgas, and Francis A. Shoup were prominent in the university's postbellum revival.

Because of the damage and disruptions during the Civil War, construction came to a temporary halt. Polk died in action during the Atlanta campaign. He is remembered through his portrait Sword Over the Gown, painted by Eliphalet F. Andrews in 1900. After the original was vandalized in 1998, a copy by Connie Erickson was unveiled on June 1, 2003.

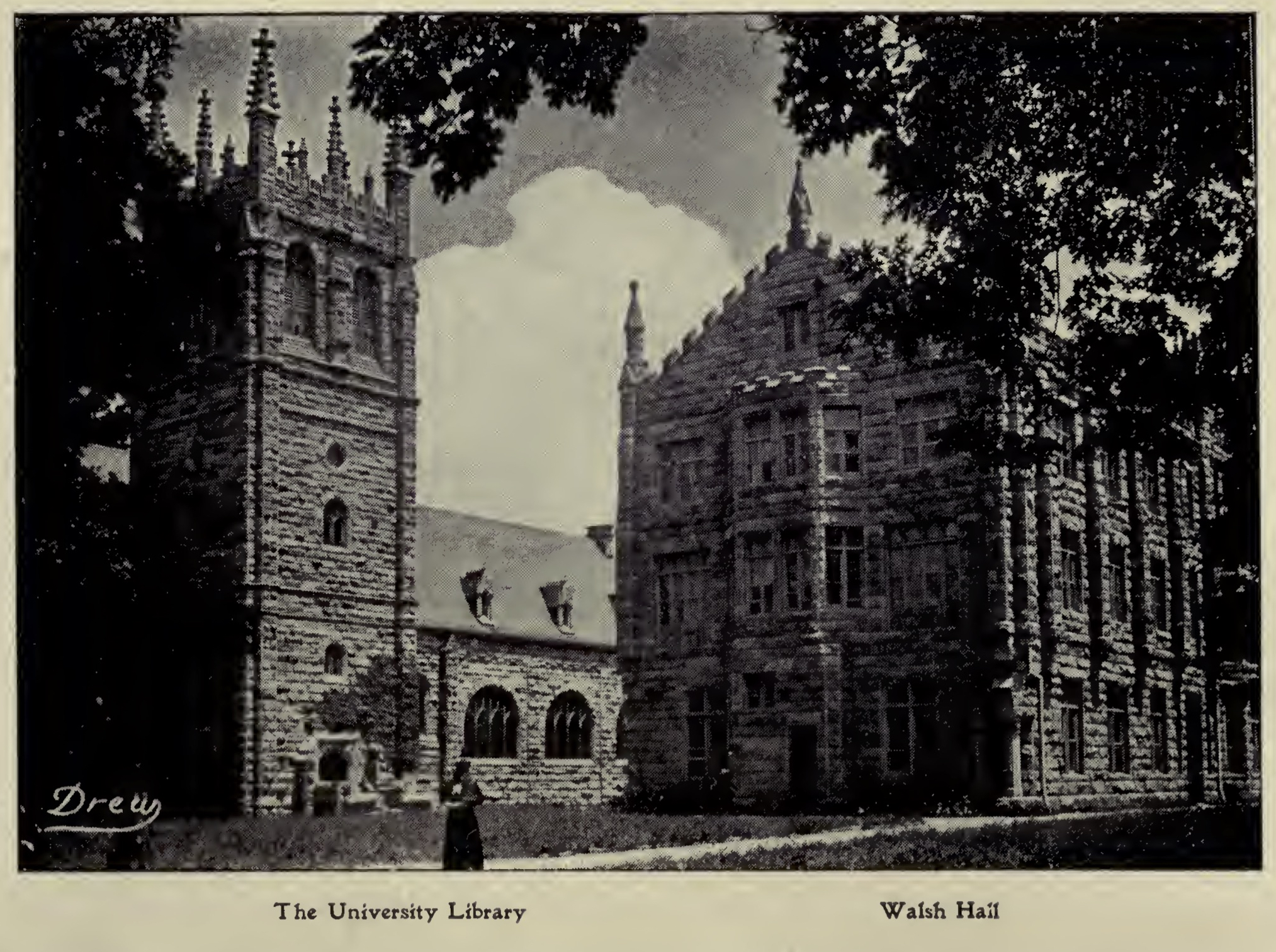
University Library and Walsh Hall, c. 1905

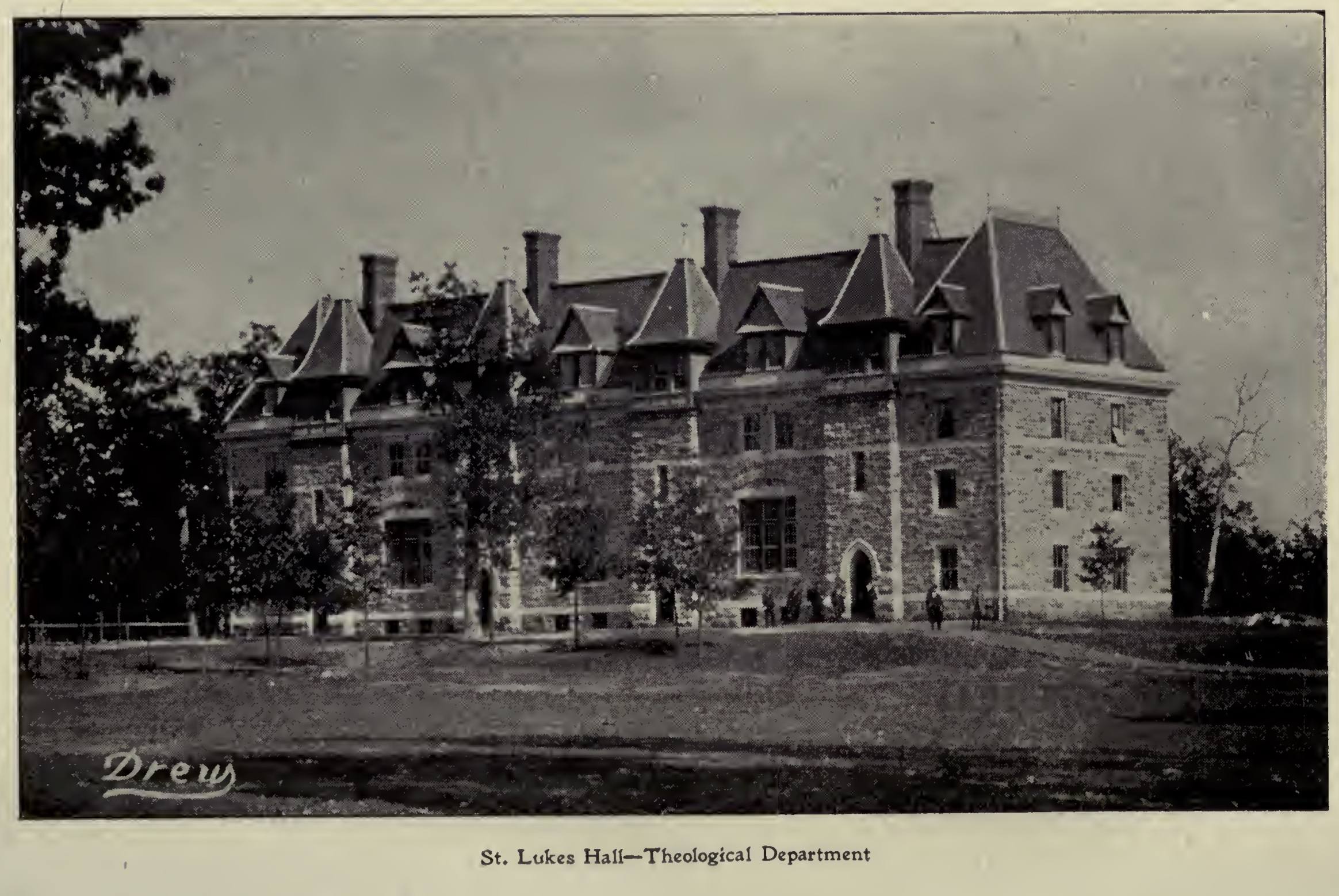
St. Lukes Hall, c. 1905

In 1866, building was resumed, and this date is sometimes used as the re-founding of the university and the year from which it has maintained continuous operations, though official materials and anniversary celebrations still use 1857. The university's first convocation was held on September 18, 1868, with nine students and four faculty members present. Presiding was Charles Todd Quintard, vice-chancellor (chief academic officer) of the university, second Bishop of Tennessee and "Chaplain of the Confederacy". He attended the first Lambeth Conference (1868) in England and received financial support from clergy and laity of the Church of England for rebuilding the school. Quintard is known as the "Re-Founder" of the University of the South.

During World War II, the University of the South was one of 131 tertiary institutions nationally that took part in the V-12 Navy College Training Program, which offered students a path to a Navy commission.

=== 2004 name change ===
For the period 2004 to about 2016, the institution combined its two historical names in all university publications that were not official documents and styled itself as "Sewanee: The University of the South". Version three of the university's style guide, a document reflecting the official policies of the university with respect to its public image following the name change, stated in part:

First, it must be understood that the official and legal name of this institution is "The University of the South". In the past, though, unorganized use of this official name and the university's familiar name, Sewanee, has been confusing to those unfamiliar with the institution. In addition, college guides and Web sites that have become so crucial in young people's college searches may list the institution under as many as four different entries—beginning with "The", "University", "South", or "Sewanee". To avoid confusion and to honor the history and character of the institution, a consistent reference to the name of the institution is critical. So, for extended audiences unfamiliar with the institution, the naming convention "Sewanee: The University of the South" should be used on a first reference. Subsequent references may be to "Sewanee" or "the University".

A minor scandal ensued, with more conservative commentators insinuating that the change was intended to "distance" the university from its historic association with Southern culture. "Some alumni were also angered by a report commissioned by the university last year [2004] by a marketing firm from Chicago that said that the word 'South' often had negative connotations for students around the country; the weaker the connection between the South and the university's name, the better, the consultants said." As of February 2016, the university has reverted to using the University of the South as its official name on all correspondence.

=== 2018 Charlie Rose controversy ===
In the wake of several women coming forward with allegations of sexual harassment against television personality Charlie Rose, many educational institutions revoked honorary degrees bestowed on him. Sewanee's board of regents initially declined to do so, citing a desire to "not condemn the individual". However, due to backlash from student members of the board of trustees and faculty in the university's school of theology, the board of regents reversed their original decision and rescinded Rose's honorary doctorate.

=== Ties to slavery and the Roberson Project ===
In September 2020, the university's governing board released a statement acknowledging for the first time that the university "was long entangled with, and played a role in, slavery, racial segregation, and white supremacy". It added that the university "categorically rejects its past veneration of the Confederacy and of the 'Lost Cause' and wholeheartedly commits itself to an urgent process of institutional reckoning ...". The university announced that it will utilize the findings of its Roberson Project on Slavery, Race, and Reconciliation (which began in 2017) to guide their current discussions and path forward.

== Academics ==
Schools of dentistry, engineering, law, medicine, and nursing once existed, and a secondary school was part of the institution into the second half of the 20th century. However, for financial reasons it was eventually decided to focus on the college and the School of Theology.

=== College of Arts and Sciences ===
As the largest unit of the university, the College offered bachelor's degrees in 40 majors in fall 2026. Its most popular undergraduate majors in the class of 2021 were:

- Economics (52)
- Psychology (50)
- Political Science & Government (42)
- Biology/Biological Sciences (36)
- English Language & Literature (36)
- History (28)
- International/Globalization Studies (24)

=== School of Theology ===
Theological education was part of the original vision for the university and in 1878 the theology department was organized as a seminary of the Episcopal Church. Today the School focuses on training priesthood candidates through its Master of Divinity program, along with offering the Master of Arts, Master of Sacred Theology, and Doctor of Ministry degrees and a selection of master's-level certificates.

The School also houses Education for Ministry (EfM), an extension course designed for lay theological education in parishes, and publishes two academic journals: the Anglican Theological Review and the Sewanee Theological Review (known as the St. Luke's Journal of Theology from 1957 to 1991).

=== School of Letters ===
The School of Letters was established in 2006 as a summer degree program and offers a Master of Fine Arts in Creative Writing. A Master of Arts in American Literature was offered until 2022.

== Campus ==
The Sewanee campus overlooks the Tennessee Valley and consists of 13,000 acres (5,300 ha) on the Cumberland Plateau. It includes many buildings constructed of various materials faced with local stone, most done in the Gothic style. In 2011, it was named by Travel + Leisure as one of the most beautiful college campuses in the United States, and the beauty of its campus is consistently recognized by other, leading publications.

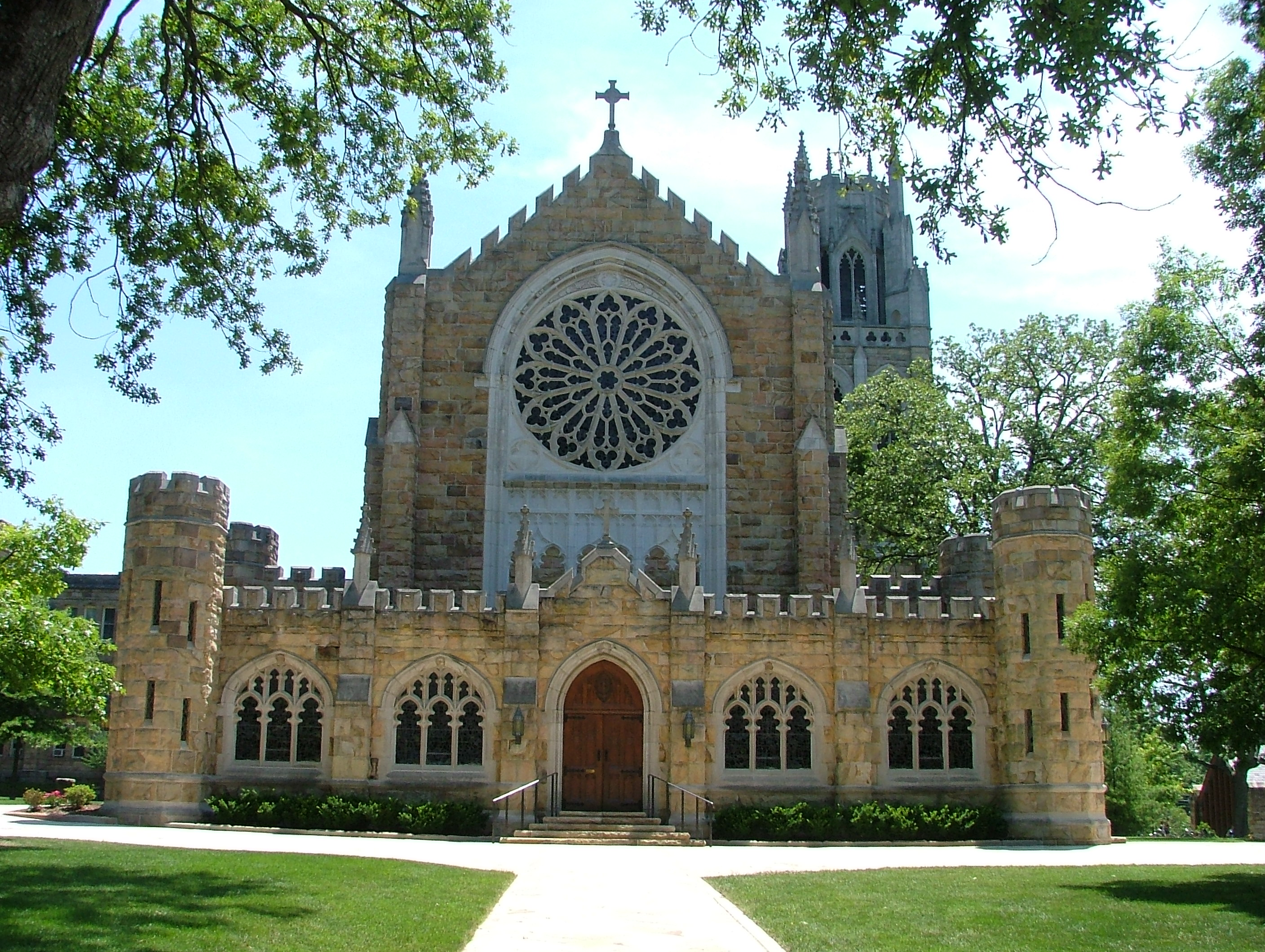
All Saints' Chapel

- All Saints' Chapel was originally designed by Ralph Adams Cram and began construction in 1904 (replacing the smaller, wooden St. Augustine's Chapel which stood nearby), but the Panic of 1907 left the university without the funds to complete it. It was completed in 1959 to a design by Vice-Chancellor Edward McCrady. McCrady was also responsible for the connection of the buildings of the original quadrangle with cloisters. The final window was installed in 2004, nearly 100 years after construction began on the chapel.
- St. Luke's Chapel, designed by the architect Charles C. Haight and built in 1904, is one of three chapels on the campus (All Saints, Chapel of The Apostles, St. Luke's). St. Luke's is located next to St. Luke's Hall (1887) which formerly housed the School of Theology. The chapel itself is used in various capacities over the academic year, including hosting services in the Taizé style of worship.
- The Fowler Center is located on Texas Avenue and is the recreation center for the university. It houses swimming pools, basketball courts, tennis courts, a running track, and weight rooms and group exercise rooms. Many of the trophies from Sewanee's athletic history are also located in this building.
- The duPont Library first opened in 1965. It hosts around 750,000 printed volumes. Special features of the duPont Library include: the Theology Library, the William Ralston Listening Library & Archive (containing a state of the art listening space and over 15,000 compact discs), and the Cup and Gown Café.
- The Chapel of the Apostles was designed by the Arkansas architectural firm of E. Fay Jones and Maurice J. Jennings for the School of Theology and was dedicated and consecrated in October 2000. Primarily used as the worship center for the School of Theology, the chapel hosts services Monday through Friday during sessions. The Daily Office is prayed daily along with celebrations of the Eucharist.

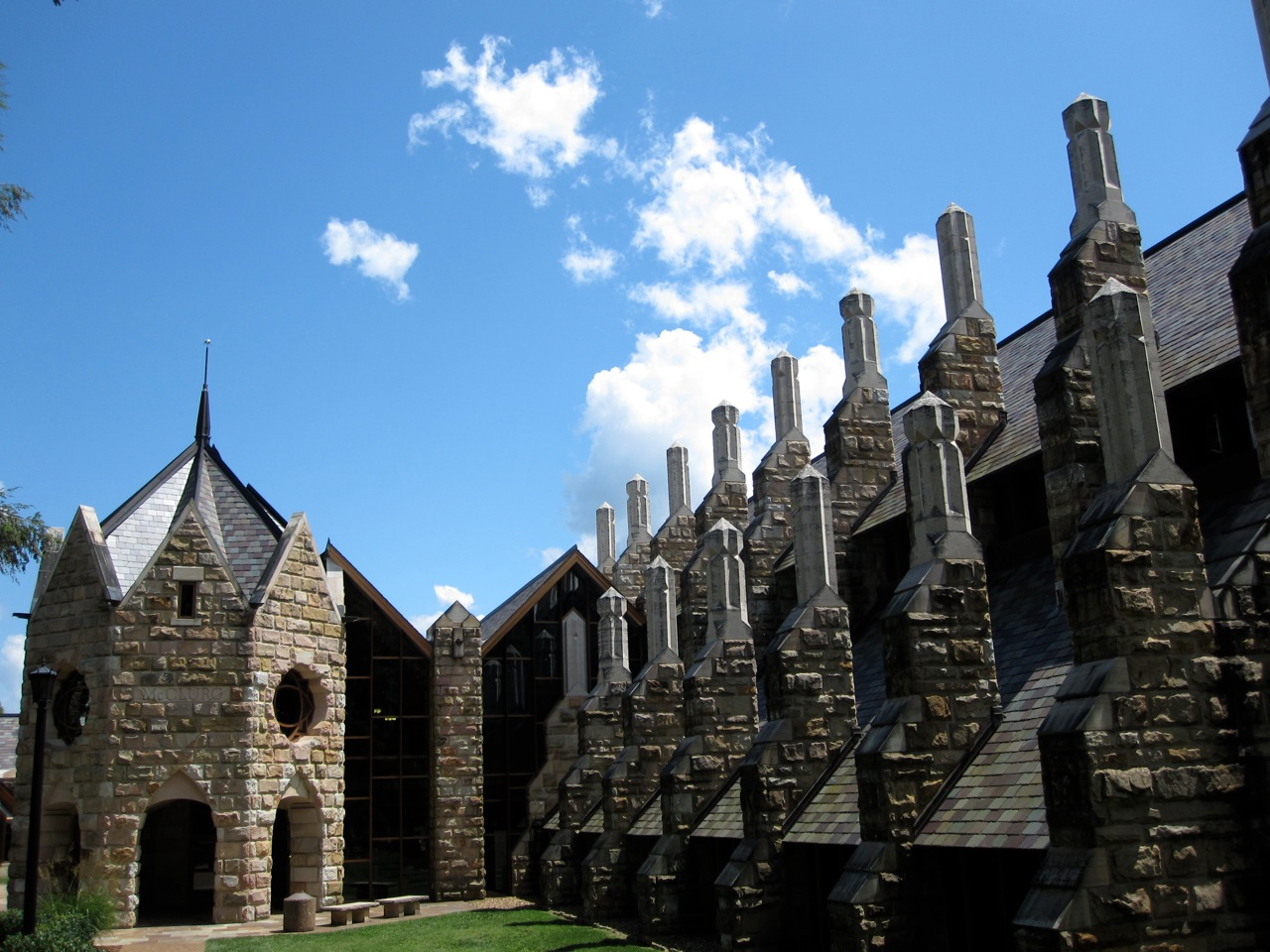
McClurg Hall

- Sewanee has 19 traditional dormitories, each housing a mix of students from all class years. Theme housing, consisting of small living units focused on a common interest such as a foreign language, is also available. Ninety-nine percent of Sewanee students live in campus housing.
- The School of Theology is located on Tennessee Avenue near Gorgas and Quintard residence halls and houses the School of Theology, its faculty, its classrooms, and the Beecken Center, and administrative offices for the Education for Ministry program. Prior to 1981, the building housed the Sewanee (Military) Academy, now part of St. Andrew's-Sewanee School nearby.
- Spencer Hall houses the chemistry, biology, and biochemistry departments, as well as components of environmental science. Its completion in late August 2008 provided an additional 49,000 square feet (4,600 m^{2}) to the existing Woods Lab science building. Sustainable building practices and technology were incorporated into Spencer Hall.
- Snowden Hall houses the Department of Forestry and Geology and components of environmental science. A new 10,000-square-foot (930 m^{2}) addition and remodeling of the building was completed in 2010, making this the university's first LEED Gold–certified building. 3,000 square feet (280 m^{2}) of solar panels provide about a third of the building's electricity needs, and a bioswale filters runoff from the roof top.
- Gailor Hall, originally constructed to serve as the university's dining hall and another dormitory, now houses the english and foreign language departments, as well as the Roberson Project offices.
- The Tennessee Williams Center is the home of the Department of Theatre and Dance.

== Literary associations ==
The Sewanee Review, founded in 1892, is the oldest continuously published literary magazine in the United States, and has published many distinguished authors. Its success helped launch the Sewanee Writers' Conference, held each summer. The School of Letters, offering an M.A. in English and M.F.A. in Creative Writing, was established in 2006. The current editor is Adam Ross.

Sewanee and its environs have been the (temporary or full-time) residence of such authors as Allen Tate, Andrew Lytle, William Alexander Percy, Walker Percy, Shelby Foote, Caroline Gordon, and Robert Lowell. In 1983 playwright and Pulitzer Prize winner Tennessee Williams left his literary rights to the University of the South. Ensuing royalties helped build the Tennessee Williams Center, a performance venue and teaching facility, and create the Tennessee Williams teaching fellowships, which bring well-known figures in the arts to the campus.

"Ecce quam bonum et quam iucundum habitare fratres in unum", the university's motto, is taken from the opening of Psalm 133: "Behold how good and how pleasant it is for brethren to dwell together in unity."

== Environmental sustainability ==
Since fall 2008, the university has held an annual Sustainability Week, which featured speakers, feasts of local foods, and environmentally themed documentaries. The campus is also home to an environmental sustainability house, the Green House, and residence halls have environmental sustainability representatives. In 2007, the university became a signatory to the President's Climate Commitment. As of 2011, the university received a "B" on the College Sustainability Report Card.

== Institutional traditions ==
Academic rankings

Liberal arts
- U.S. News & World Report: 45
- Washington Monthly: 73

National
- Forbes: 154
- WSJ/College Pulse: 141

The school is rich in distinctive traditions, many of which are tied to Southern culture. For example, male students have historically worn coats and ties to classes—this tradition has generally been continued. Faculty and student members of the primary honor society and main branch of student government, the Order of Gown (changed after controversy surrounding the exclusivity of the title "order of the gownsmen"), may wear academic gowns to teach or attend class—one of the last vestiges of this historically English practice in North America. Furthermore, the Order is charged with the maintenance of this and other traditions of the university.

=== Greek life ===
The university saw the installation of its first fraternity in 1877 with the founding of the Tennessee Omega chapter of Alpha Tau Omega. In 1880, that chapter became the first of any fraternity in the South to have its own chapter house or lodge, which belonged to the fraternity until its closure in 2021. As of 2022, slightly over half of Sewanee male students are members of fraternities, and slightly over two-thirds of female students belong to sororities.

=== Mace controversy ===
The university mace, an unsolicited gift dedicated to early Ku Klux Klan leader Nathan Bedford Forrest, which prominently featured a Confederate battle flag, has been a point of interest in the debate over the university's identity, because of its association with Forrest and its implications for attitudes toward African Americans. Forrest had no connection with the university; the mace had been commissioned in 1964 by Louise Claiborne-Armstrong, whose brother attended the university. (A portrait of her by Amanda Brewster Sewell is in the University Art Gallery.)

It was given to the university in 1965 and was carried by the president of the Order of Gownsmen at academic processions until it disappeared in 1997. Upon its rediscovery, various alumni offered to pay for the mace's repair but the university declined their offer.

== Athletics ==
Sewanee athletics monogram

Sewanee was a charter member of the Southern Intercollegiate Athletic Association in 1894. The Sewanee Tigers were pioneers in American intercollegiate athletics and possessed the Deep South's preeminent football program in the 1890s. The 1899 football team had perhaps the best season in college football history, winning all 12 of their games, 11 by shutout, and outscoring their opponents 322–10. Five of those wins, all shutouts, came in a six-day period while on a 2,500-mile (4,000 km) trip by train. In 2012, the College Football Hall of Fame held a vote of the greatest historic teams of all time, where the 1899 Iron Men beat the 1961 Alabama Crimson Tide as the greatest team of all time.

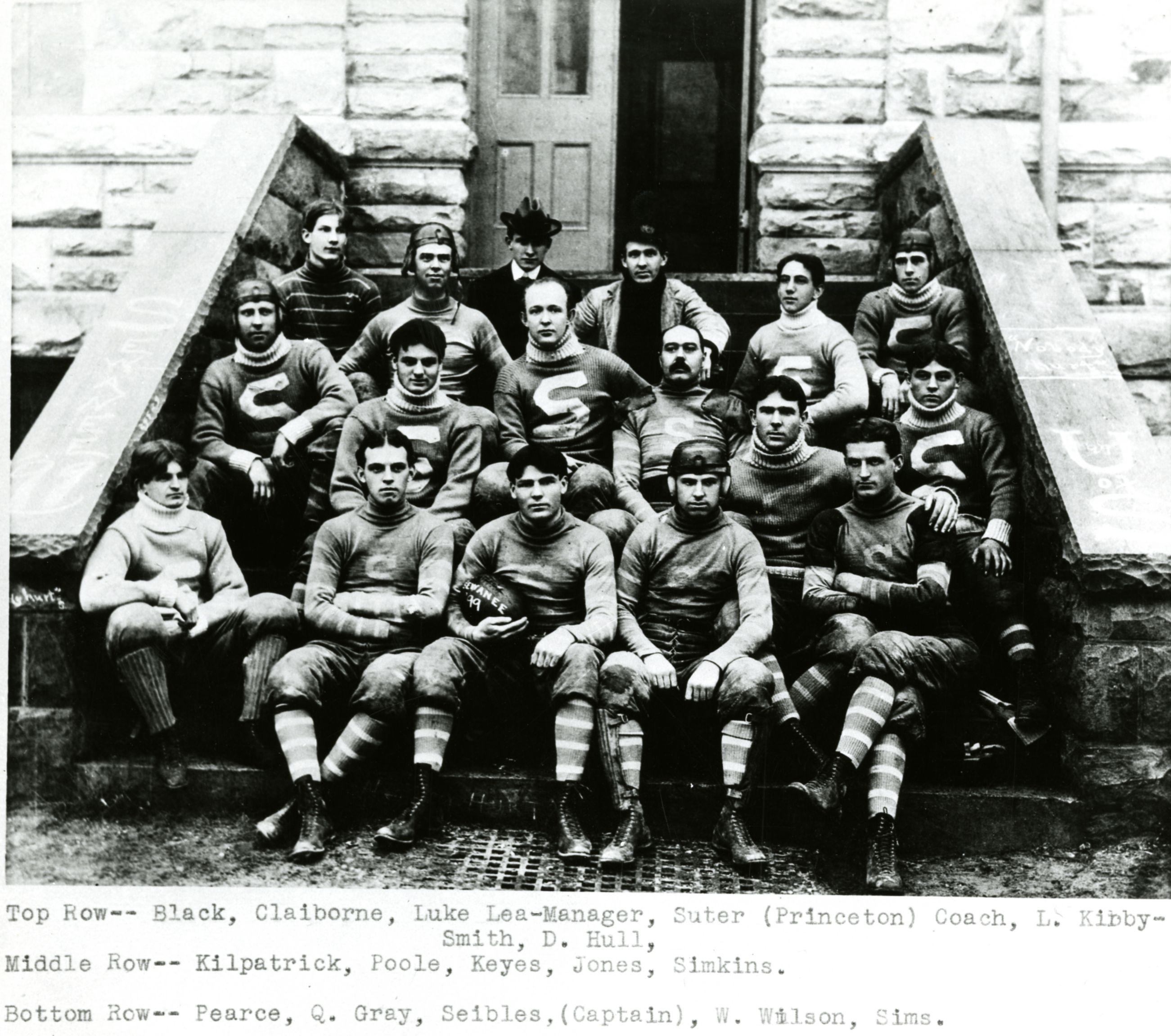
The famed "Iron Men" of the 1899 Sewanee Tigers football team, led by coach Billy Suter and captain Henry Seibels, and managed by future U.S. Senator Luke Lea

Sewanee was also a charter member of the Southeastern Conference upon its formation in 1932. By this time, however, its athletic program had declined precipitously and Sewanee never won a conference football game in the eight years it was an SEC member. The Tigers were shut out 26 times in their 37 SEC games, and were outscored by a combined total of 1163–84.

When Vice Chancellor Benjamin Ficklin Finney, who had reportedly objected to Sewanee joining the SEC, left his position in 1938, the leading candidate was Alexander Guerry, a former president of the University of Chattanooga. According to a university historian, Guerry agreed to come to Sewanee only if the school stopped awarding athletic scholarships. In 1940, two years after Guerry's arrival, Sewanee withdrew from the SEC and subsequently deemphasized varsity athletics. Guerry's stance is sometimes credited as an early step toward the 1973 creation of NCAA Division III, which prohibits athletic scholarships.

Sewanee went on to become a charter member of the College Athletic Conference in 1962. The conference, now the Southern Collegiate Athletic Conference (SCAC), consists of small, academically focused private liberal arts colleges such as Sewanee.

Sewanee is now a member of the Southern Athletic Association (SAA), offering 11 varsity sports for men and 13 for women. As is the case for all of its previous conferences, Sewanee is a charter member of its current conference—it was one of the seven SCAC members that announced their departure from that conference at the 2011 annual meeting of SCAC presidents. The seven were joined by Berry College, another small private school in Georgia.

== Notable alumni and faculty ==
Sewanee has over 12,000 alumni from all 50 states and 40 countries and has produced 26 Rhodes Scholars, as well as 34 NCAA Postgraduate Fellows, 46 Watson Fellowships, and dozens of Fulbright Scholars. Several alumni of the College and the School of Theology have become bishops of the Episcopal Church, among them Gene Robinson, the first Anglican bishop in a same-sex partnership; and three presiding bishops: John Allin, John E. Hines, and Edmond L. Browning.

== See also ==
- Cordell-Lorenz Observatory
- Sewanee Perimeter Trail
