= Saint Nicholas Orthodox Church (Arkansas) =

Antiochian Orthodox parish in Springdale, Arkansas

St. Nicholas Orthodox Church
- Saint Nicholas Antiochian Orthodox Church
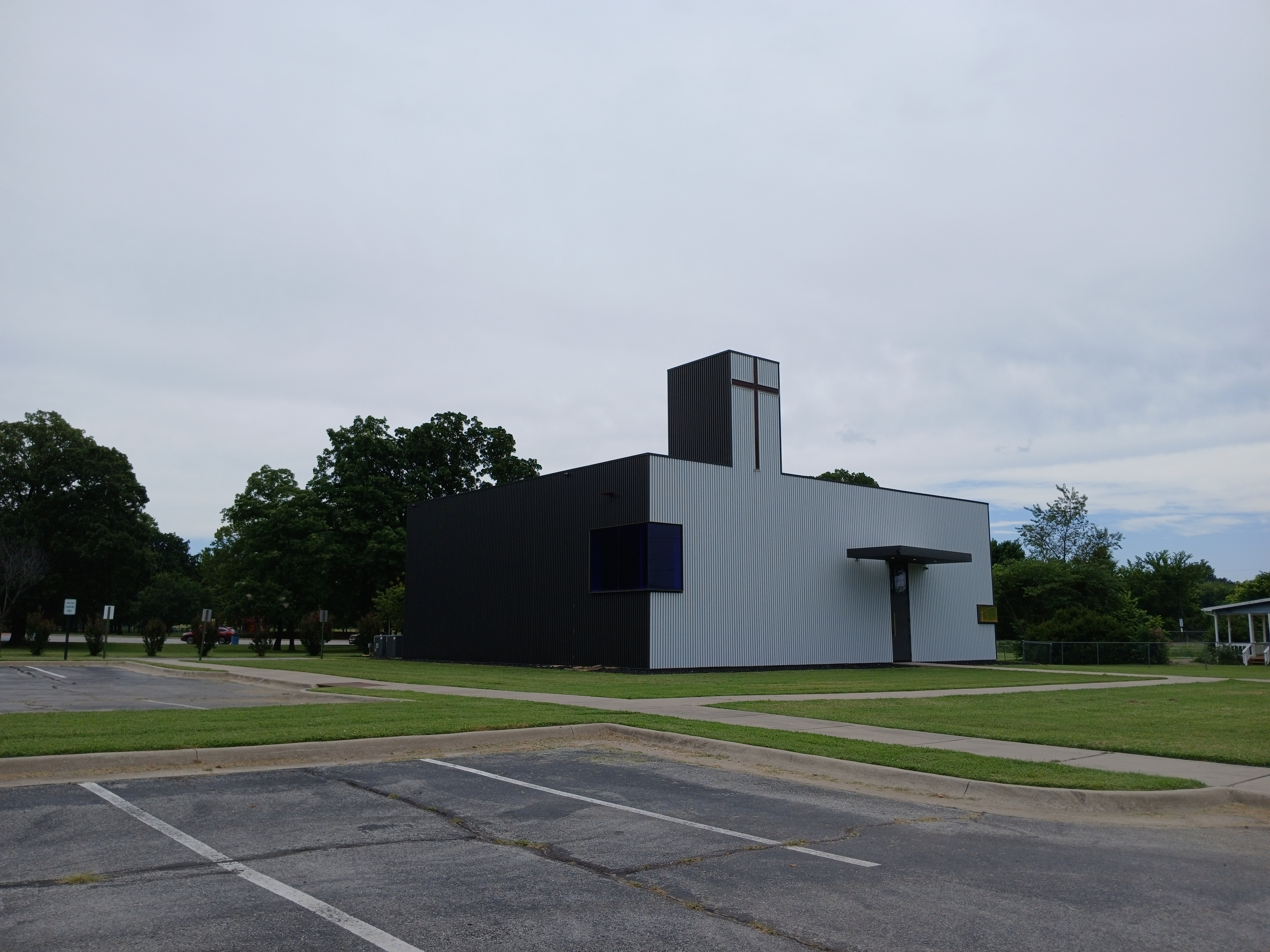
- July, 2024

- Location within Arkansas Location within the United States
- 36.15778°N 94.18342°W
- Location: 3171 S 48th St; Springdale, Arkansas
- Country: United States
- Language: English
- Denomination: Eastern Orthodox
- Website: stnicholasar.org

History
- Status: Parish church
- Dedication: Saint Nicholas

Architecture
- Functional status: Active
- Architect: Marlon Blackwell
- Completed: December 2009
- Construction cost: US$405,000 (equivalent to US$607,783 in 2025)

Administration
- Province: Greek Orthodox Patriarchate of Antioch and All the East
- Archdiocese: Antiochian Orthodox Christian Archdiocese of North America
- Diocese: Diocese of Miami and the Southeast

Clergy
- Archbishop: The Most Rev. Metr. Joseph (al-Zehlaoui)
- Bishop: The Right Rev. Bp. Nicholas (Ozone)
- Rector: The Rev. Fr. Paul Fuller

Saint Nicholas Orthodox Church is a church in Springdale, Arkansas. Jonathan Boelkins was the project manager. It was converted from a metal shop garage. Marlon Blackwell was the church's architect. The church is located at 3171 South 48th Street across I-540 from Arvest Ballpark.

It includes a skylit tower and an addition on the western side. It is modern and sparse in decoration. It received the 2013 American Institute of Architects Honor Awards for Architecture, the 2012 AIA Small Project Award, the 2011 World Architecture Festival – Best Civic and Community Building award, the 2011 Chicago Athenaeum American Architecture Award, the 2011 Gulf States Regional AIA Merit Award, was the 2011 Architectural Record Magazine Online – November Feature, received the 2010 Architect Magazine Design Review Honor Award and won a 2010 Arkansas AIA Honor Award.
