= University of Arkansas Fay Jones School of Architecture and Design =

Architecture school at the University of Arkansas

Fay Jones School of Architecture and Design
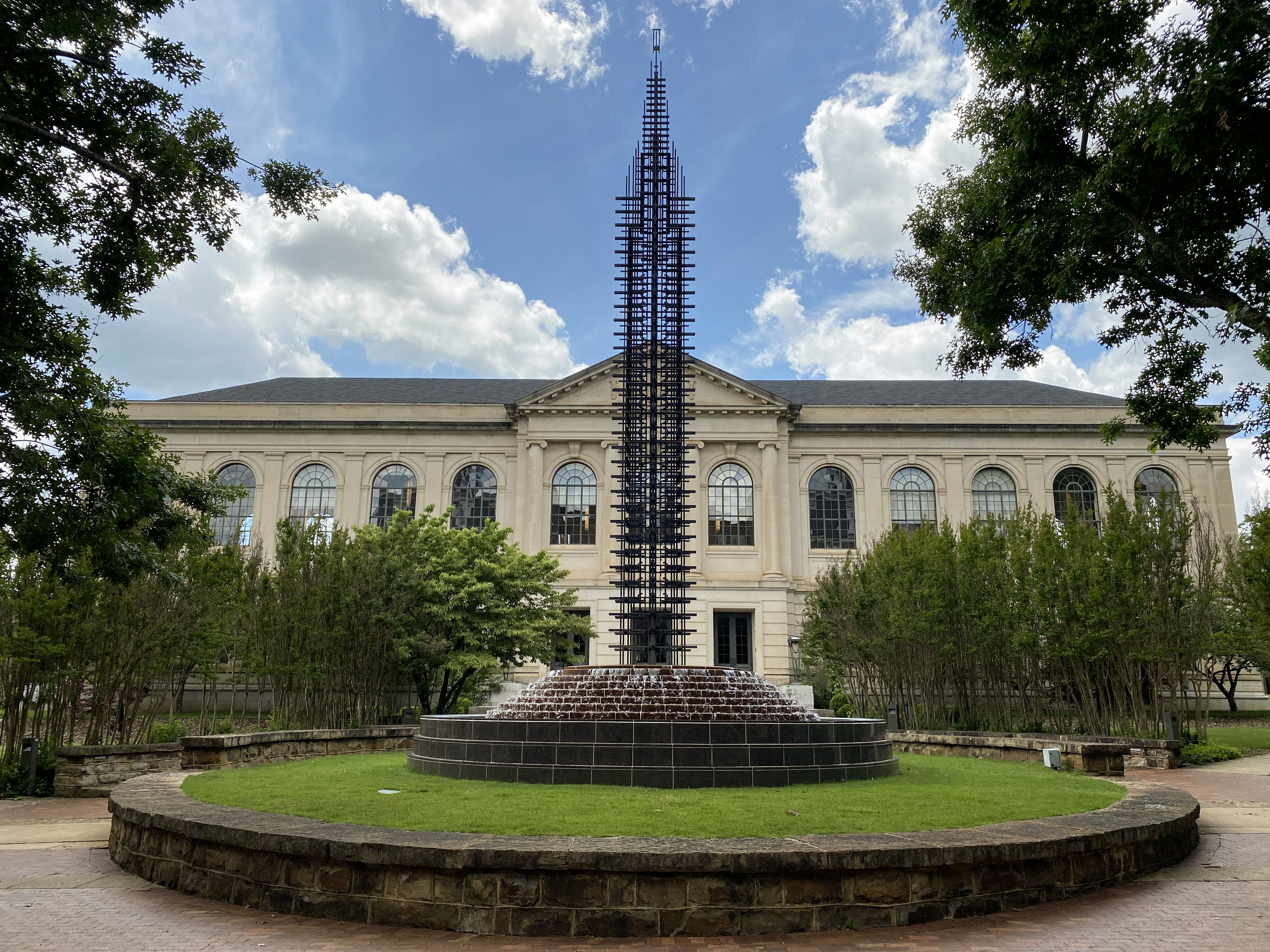
- Vol Walker Hall, home of the Fay Jones School of Architecture and Design
- Established: 1946
- Parent institution: University of Arkansas
- Dean: Peter MacKeith
- Academic staff: 35
- Students: 522 (2012)
- Location: Fayetteville, Arkansas, U.S. 36°04′07″N 94°10′22″W
- Website: fayjones.uark.edu

The Fay Jones School of Architecture and Design is the architecture school of the University of Arkansas, a public land-grant research university in Fayetteville, Arkansas. It offers education in architecture, landscape architecture, and interior design and was founded in 1946.

== History ==
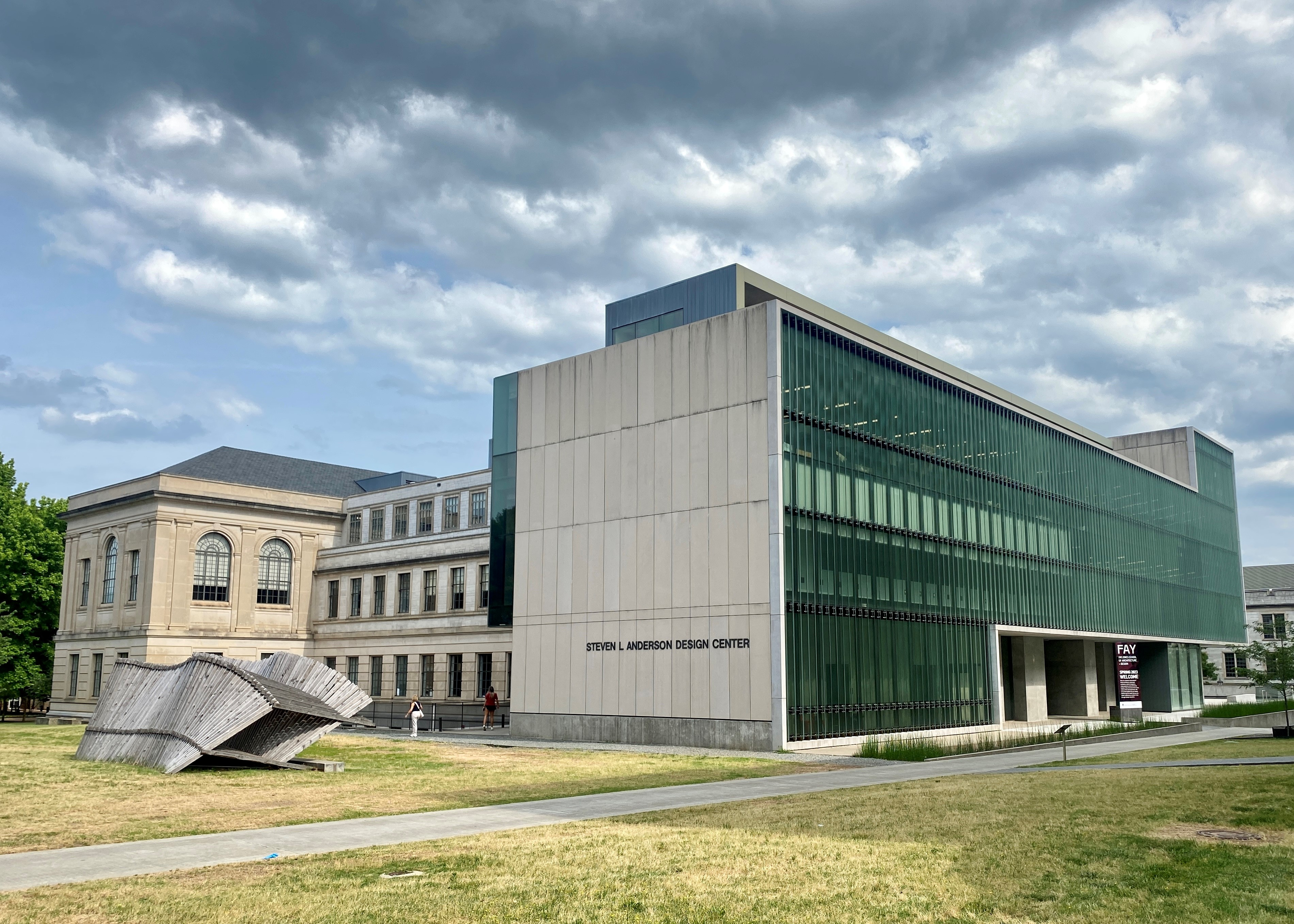
The Design Center extension, adjacent to Vol Walker Hall

Vol Walker Hall was built in 1935 as the university’s library. Since 1968, it has served as home to the architecture school, although some programs of the school have been located in other campus facilities during that time. The renovated historic building, plus the significant addition, allows the school, for the first time, to accommodate the faculty and students of all three disciplines – architecture, landscape architecture and interior design – along with support staff, in a shared space.

The Fay Jones School of Architecture and Design began in 1946-47 as architecture courses within the College of Engineering, with John G. Williams teaching 17 students, including future faculty members E. Fay Jones and Ernie Jacks. In 1948, the architecture program transferred into the College of Arts and Sciences. The National Architectural Accrediting Board (NAAB) accredited the architecture program in 1958. The landscape architecture program was established in 1975 and has been accredited by the Landscape Architecture Accreditation Board (LAAB) of the American Society of Landscape Architects (ASLA) since 1983. After many years in planning, the Interior Design program moved to the school in July 2010. The Interior Design program is a CIDA (Council of Interior Design Accreditation) accredited program.

In 1974, the program became a school, with Fay Jones serving as the first dean. In 2009, the school was renamed the Fay Jones School of Architecture and Design, at the request of Don and Ellen Edmondson, former clients of Jones', who made a $10 million planned gift.

On September 12, 2013, the renovated Vol Walker Hall and the new addition, the Steven L. Anderson Design Center, were rededicated and dedicated, respectively, on the west side of the addition.

In 2010, the Donald W. Reynolds Foundation donated $10 million to name the addition to Vol Walker Hall the Steven L. Anderson Design center, honoring Anderson, foundation president and a 1976 graduate of the Fay Jones School’s architecture program. The U of A also contributed $19.8 million toward the project, an example of how the campus facilities fee is being used to help pay for deferred maintenance and renovation for specific capital improvements.

The 34,320-square-foot design center addition is made from limestone panels, steel, architectural concrete, Arkansas white oak and glass. Added to the 56,635 square feet in Vol Walker Hall, the total space in the building is now 90,955 square feet. According to current estimates, the project cost was a little more than $36.6 million.

The facility includes several design studios, a computer lab, a design shop, a 200-seat lecture hall, a securable exhibition gallery, student and faculty lounge areas, and a green roof.

Marlon Blackwell is the E. Fay Jones Chair in Architecture in the Fay Jones School at the U of A, where he has taught since 1992.

== Academics ==
Five degrees total may be attained from the Fay Jones School of Architecture and Design: the Bachelor of Architecture (B.Arch.) and Bachelor of Landscape Architecture (B.L.A.), each of which requires about 10 semesters of work; Bachelor of Interior Design (B.I.D.), which is a nine-semester program; and the Bachelor of Science in Architectural Studies (ARSTBS) and Bachelor of Science in Landscape Architecture Studies (LARCBS), both of which are the basis for graduate work in architecture or further education in other fields. Several minors are also available.

== Facility ==
=== Community Design Center ===
The University of Arkansas Community Design Center was founded in 1995 as part of the Fay Jones School of Architecture and Design.

=== Garvan Woodland Gardens ===
Garvan Woodland Gardens, located near Hot Springs, Ark., is a viable and sustainable entity within the University of Arkansas at Fayetteville. This program furthers the University’s mission of teaching, research and public service. It was established in honor of the heiress Verna Cook Garvan. Prior to her death in 1993, Garvan worked with landscape architecture faculty at the Fay Jones School to develop 210 wooded acres on Lake Hamilton near Hot Springs into a woodland botanical garden.

=== University of Arkansas Resiliency Center ===
The University of Arkansas Resiliency Center (RESC) is an interdisciplinary research and outreach center that is hosted by the University of Arkansas Fay Jones School of Architecture and Design. It was founded in 2018 by Dr. Marty Matlock, a professor of Ecological Engineering at the University of Arkansas.
