= E. Fay Jones =

American architect (1921–2004)

Euine Fay Jones
- Born: January 31, 1921; Pine Bluff, Arkansas
- Died: August 30, 2004 (aged 83); Fayetteville, Arkansas
- Education: University of Arkansas
- Occupation: Architect
- Known for: Thorncrown Chapel
- Spouse: Mary Elizabeth Knox (1943–2004)
- Children: 2

Euine Fay Jones (January 31, 1921 – August 30, 2004) was an American architect and designer. An apprentice of Frank Lloyd Wright during his professional career, Jones is the only one of Wright's disciples to have received the AIA Gold Medal (1990), the highest honor awarded by the American Institute of Architects. He also achieved international prominence as an architectural educator during his 35 years of teaching at the University of Arkansas School of Architecture.

His Thorncrown Chapel was added to the National Register of Historic Places in 2000, 20 years after it was built, in recognition of its architectural significance. It also has received a Twenty-five Year Award from the American Institute of Architects and other professional recognition.

== Early life ==
E. Fay Jones, (first name Euine, which is pronounced U-wan and is an old Welsh form of John), was born in Pine Bluff, Arkansas, on January 31, 1921. Jones became the only surviving child in his family after both of his sisters died at an early age. His family moved to Little Rock, and later to El Dorado, Arkansas, where he worked in the family restaurant. Jones was a longtime member of the Boy Scouts of America and earned the rank of Eagle Scout.

Jones's interest in architecture began with the design of treehouses in grammar school and high school. One of his houses had a working brick fireplace and roll-up doors and screens. In 1938, after being inspired by a short film about the Johnson Wax Headquarters, designed by American architect Frank Lloyd Wright, Jones decided to pursue a career in architecture. Jones hoped to earn an appointment to the United States Naval Academy and took civil engineering classes at the University of Arkansas to improve his chances. While enrolled, he was a brother of Kappa Sigma fraternity. Jones's hopes were dashed after his congressman was defeated for reelection and was unable to offer an appointment.

Jones married Mary Elizabeth "Gus" Knox on January 6, 1943 in San Francisco. The couple had two daughters, Janis and Cami.

== Military experience ==
At the outbreak of World War II, Jones joined the United States Navy and served in the Pacific theater of operations for fifteen months as a naval aviator piloting torpedo and dive bombers, though not in combat. He attained the rank of lieutenant.

== Post-war period ==
Jones returned to Little Rock after the war, where he worked as a draftsman for an architectural engineering firm. His talents were noticed, and he was encouraged to return to the University of Arkansas in 1946 to enroll in the new architecture program started by John G. Williams. Jones obtained a bachelor's degree in architecture in 1950, aided by the GI Bill.

He had a graduate teaching fellowship at Rice University in Houston, Texas, where he obtained a master's degree in architecture in 1951. While in Houston, at the prompting of Williams, Jones attended the 1949 American Institute of Architects conference in hopes of catching a glimpse of Wright, who was receiving that year’s Gold Medal. Jones was introduced to Wright at an after-convention party where he spent 30 minutes discussing Wright's views on architecture.

Bruce Goff offered Jones a teaching position at the University of Oklahoma, which he accepted from 1951 to 1953. Goff became a mentor and a friend to Jones, giving him another perspective on modern architecture. Jones applied for an apprenticeship at Wright's winter workshop, Taliesin West, near Scottsdale, Arizona. Later, Wright invited Jones' entire family to his home and design institute, Taliesin, in Spring Green, Wisconsin.

Jones returned to both Taliesin studios numerous times as both friend and apprentice, becoming a Taliesin Fellow in 1953. Jones greatly admired Wright, but soon established a private practice in the Ozark Mountains of northwest Arkansas.

He joined the faculty of the department of architecture at the University of Arkansas at Wright's suggestion, later serving as the first dean of the U of A School of Architecture. In 1984, the ACSA (Association of Collegiate Schools of Architecture) honored Jones with the ACSA Distinguished Professor Award.

== Design career ==
Jones preferred the rural quiet of the Arkansas mountains to the urban landscape. He ignored architectural trends and developed his own organic aesthetic with materials found in The Ozarks and familiar traditional forms from his home region. Jones's work focused primarily on the intimate rather than the grandiose. His most renowned works were chapels and private homes, rather than skyscrapers.

Former President Bill Clinton wrote about one of Jones’s homes in his 2004 autobiography My Life. Clinton had lived in Fayetteville in the 1970s while teaching at the University of Arkansas law school, and moved into a Jones home near the campus. Clinton called it a “perfect place to live, a beautiful little house.”

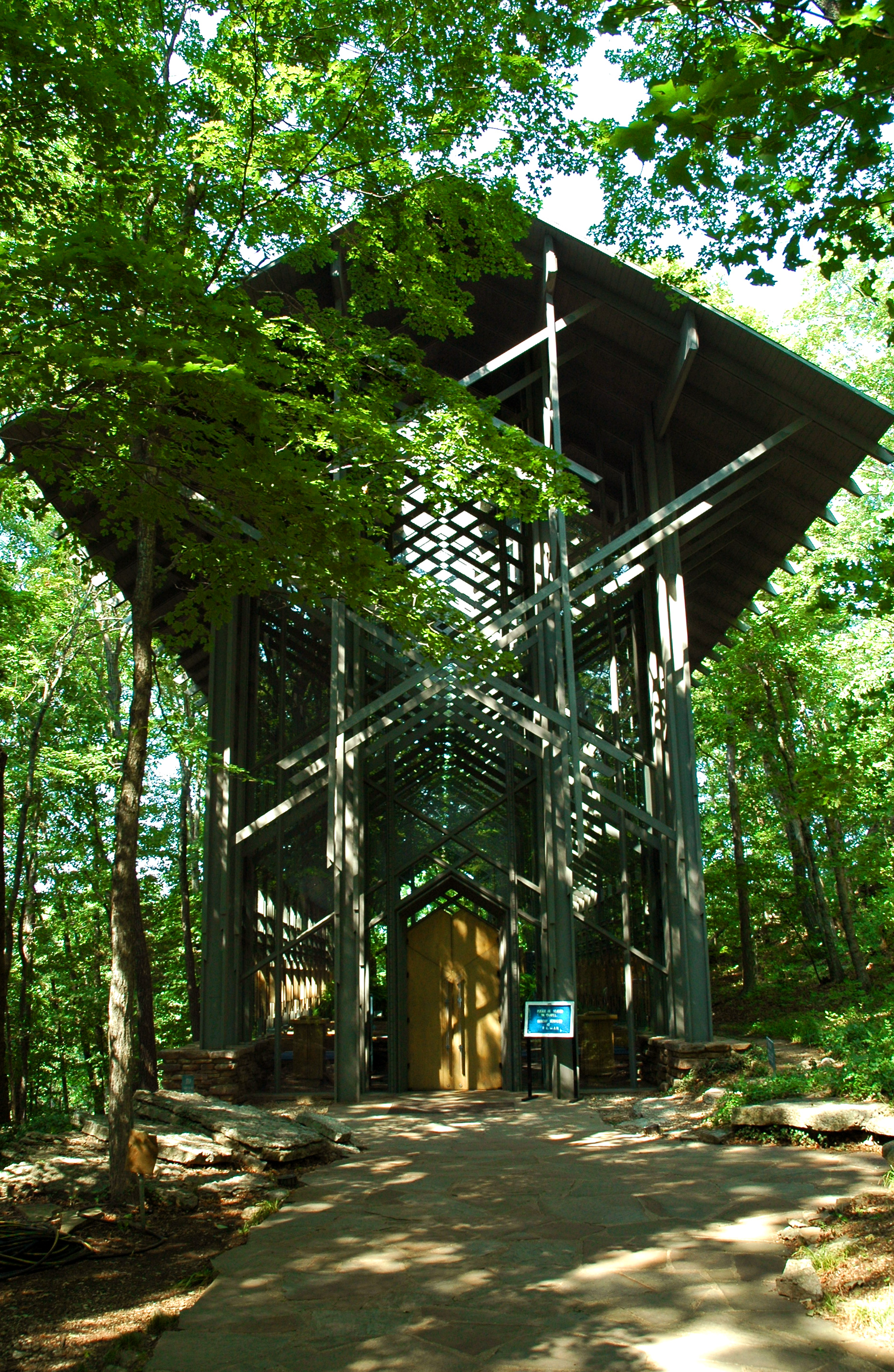
Thorncrown Chapel was added to the National Register of Historic Places in 2000 due to its exceptional architectural significance, although generally buildings must be at least 50 years old to qualify.

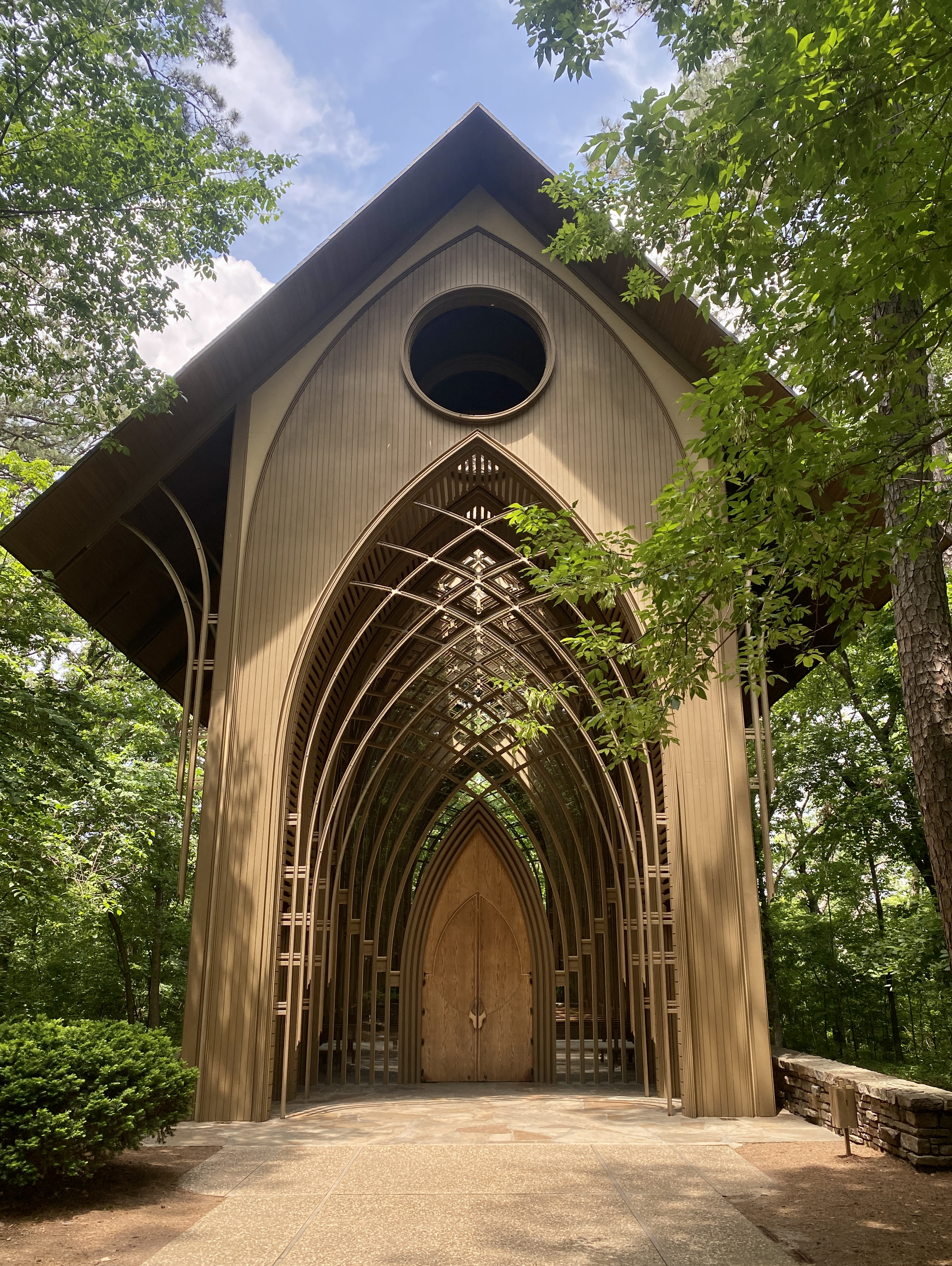
Mildred B. Cooper Memorial Chapel in Bella Vista, Arkansas.

Jones used Frank Lloyd Wright's principles, but made unique buildings. His most famous buildings were the Thorncrown Chapel in Eureka Springs, Arkansas; the Mildred B. Cooper Memorial Chapel in Bella Vista, Arkansas; the Pinecote Pavilion at the Crosby Arboretum in Picayune, Mississippi; and the Anthony Chapel located at Garvan Woodland Gardens in Hot Springs, Arkansas which was built by his partner, Maurice Jennings. These buildings were simple and transcendental creations of wood. In a poll of the membership of the American Institute of Architects, Thorncrown Chapel was ranked as the fourth most favored building. Thorncrown was also selected as the best American building constructed since 1980.

Jones also designed the Marty Leonard Chapel in Fort Worth, Texas, which was built in 1990. In 1997, his John B. Begley Chapel was dedicated on the campus of Lindsey Wilson College in Columbia, Kentucky. The Begley Chapel was Jones's first all-brick chapel.

The architect was also known for creating unique designs for furniture such as his stacking stool in the Cooper Hewitt, Smithsonian Design Museum collection and public art projects, such as the Fulbright Peace Fountain located at the University of Arkansas main campus.

Jones viewed architecture as

"the science and art of building, both of these things. But, it's more than mere construction or mere building or the technical putting together of things. It's more than mere accommodation, or, certainly not just stylistic notions; it must transcend these things, and it's something that the human spirit has to be involved with."

Jones was recalled as a gentle and unassuming man. His business partner, Maurice Jennings, stated that he had worked with Jones for 25 years without one instance of emotional conflict.

== Death ==
On August 31, 2004, Jones died at his home in Fayetteville, Arkansas at the age of 83 from heart and lung failure, complicated by Parkinson's disease. He was survived by his wife and two daughters.

== Legacy and honors ==
- 2009, the University of Arkansas School of Architecture was dedicated in Jones's honor. After a multi-million-dollar contribution from Don and Ellen Edmondson, the school is now known as the Fay Jones School of Architecture and Design.
- 1994, a retrospective of his work was produced for the Old State House Museum in Little Rock, Arkansas. It is available from the museum as a traveling exhibition. The University of Arkansas also published a driving tour of many of his residences and buildings in Northwest Arkansas.
- 1990, Jones received the American Institute of Architects Gold Medal.
- 1980, he was accepted as a Fellow of the American Academy in Rome.
- 1979, he was accepted as a Fellow of the American Institute of Architects.
- Jones received honorary degrees from four institutions: Kansas State University, Drury College, the University of Arkansas, and Hendrix College.
