= Holy Family Shrine =

Catholic shrine outside Omaha, Nebraska

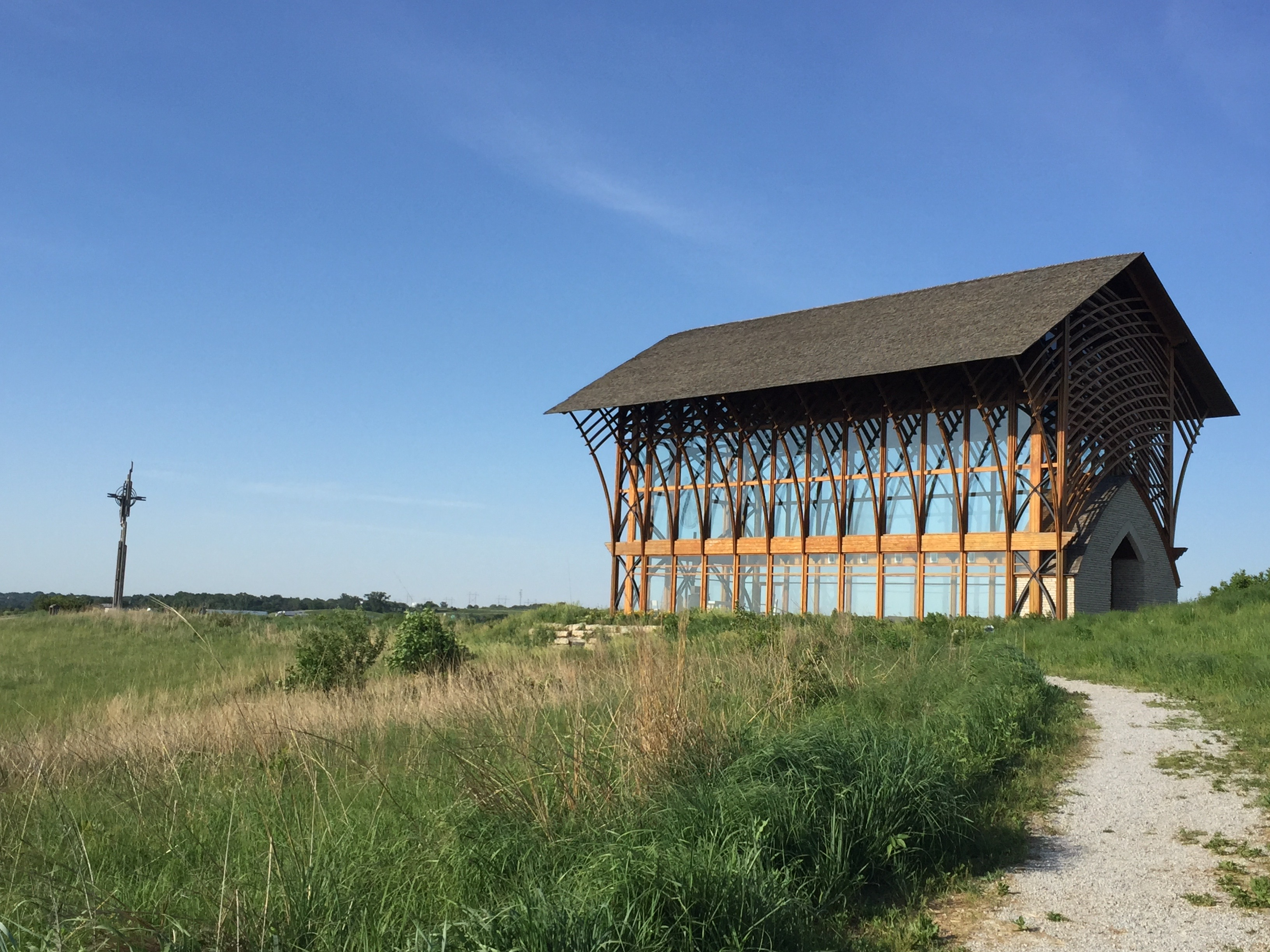
- Holy Family Shrine
- 41.075252°N 96.278174°W
- Location: 23132 Pflug Road; Gretna, Nebraska 68028
- Country: United States
- Denomination: Roman Catholic
- Website: holyfamilyshrine.com

History
- Status: Shrine

Architecture
- Functional status: Active
- Architect: Jim Dennel
- Years built: 1997-2002

Specifications
- Length: 80 ft 10 in (24.64 m)
- Width: 26 ft 9 in (8.15 m)
- Height: 31 ft 9 in (9.68 m) at eave 48 ft 9 in (14.86 m) at ridge

Administration
- Archdiocese: Omaha

Clergy
- Archbishop: George Joseph Lucas

The Holy Family Shrine is a Catholic shrine located along Interstate 80 outside of Omaha, Nebraska, near the town of Gretna. Inspired by the work of the architect E. Fay Jones, it was designed by Jim Dennel.

== History ==
The idea to build a shrine for travelers on the Interstate was conceived in 1993 when four Catholics—a priest, two architects, and another layperson—were all inspired to build a chapel for travelers "of the road and of the spirit". Its design was inspired by the work of the architect E. Fay Jones The land was purchased in 1995, but funding and administrative difficulties delayed the project for two years. Construction of the parking lot and visitor center began in 1997, but further funding to begin construction of the chapel was not secured until 1999. The chapel building topped out in July 2000. The following week, a windstorm destroyed the structure. The chapel was opened to the public in July 2002.

A path of life-size depictions of the stations of the cross was built in 2013. 20,000 people visited the chapel in 2016.

== Architecture ==
The project was designed by Jim Dennel of the Ciaccio Dennel Group (later renamed BCDM Architects) of Omaha, Nebraska. The chapel stands on bluffs that overlook Interstate 80. The chapel building, inspired by Thorncrown Chapel, is made of western red cedar beams and glass walls. The southern window features an etching of the Holy Family, the namesake of the shrine. The primarily glass construction was chosen to allow for unobstructed views of the surrounding landscape. A visitor center inspired by a prairie dugout contains a gift shop, meeting spaces, and restrooms. The entrance to the visitor center is meant to evoke the tomb of Jesus, and a sculpture hanging from a skylight to evoke his shroud. A 40-foot (12 m) cross is located past the front of the shrine, towering over the interstate below.

== Gallery ==
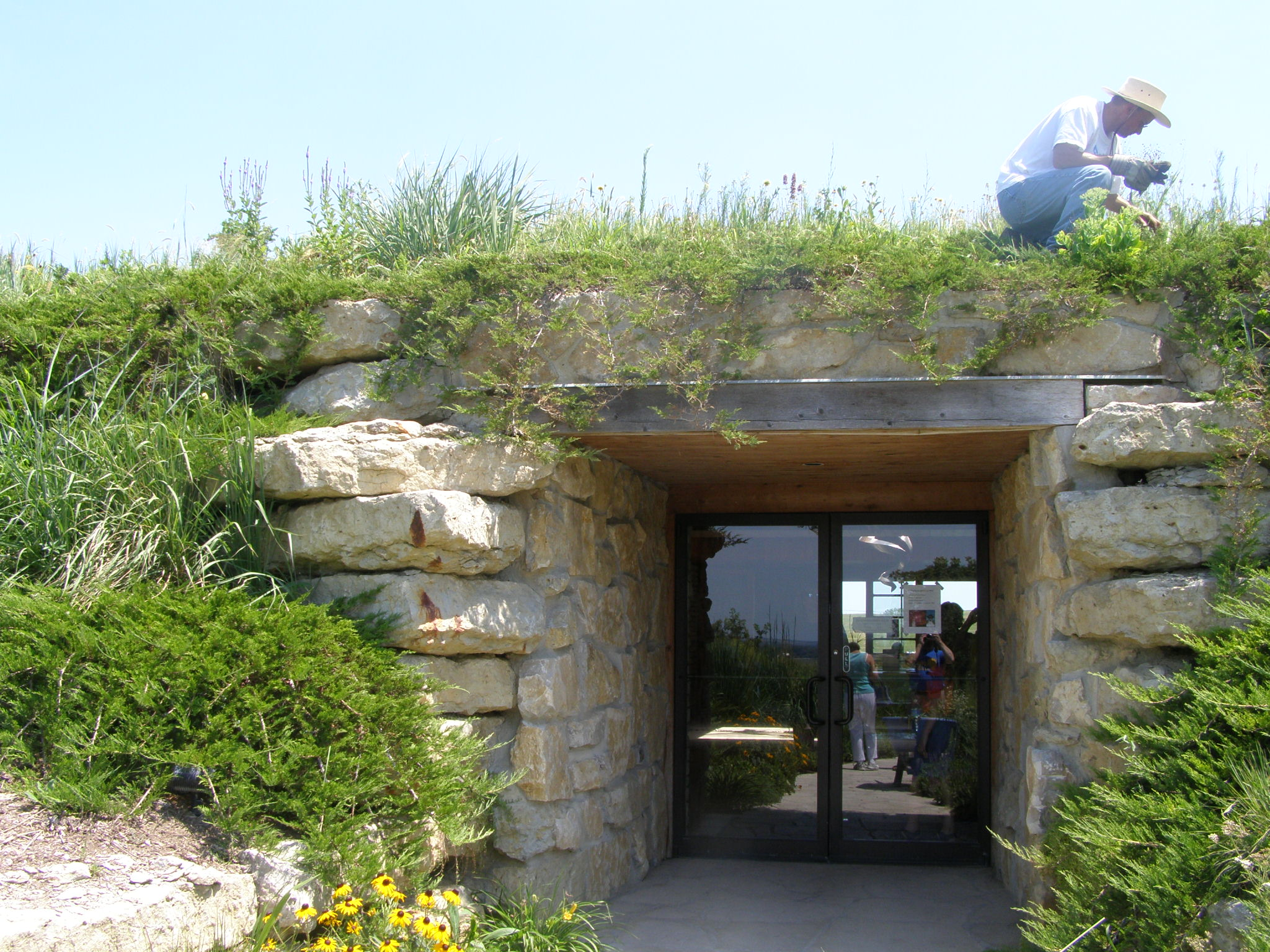
The entrance to the visitor center

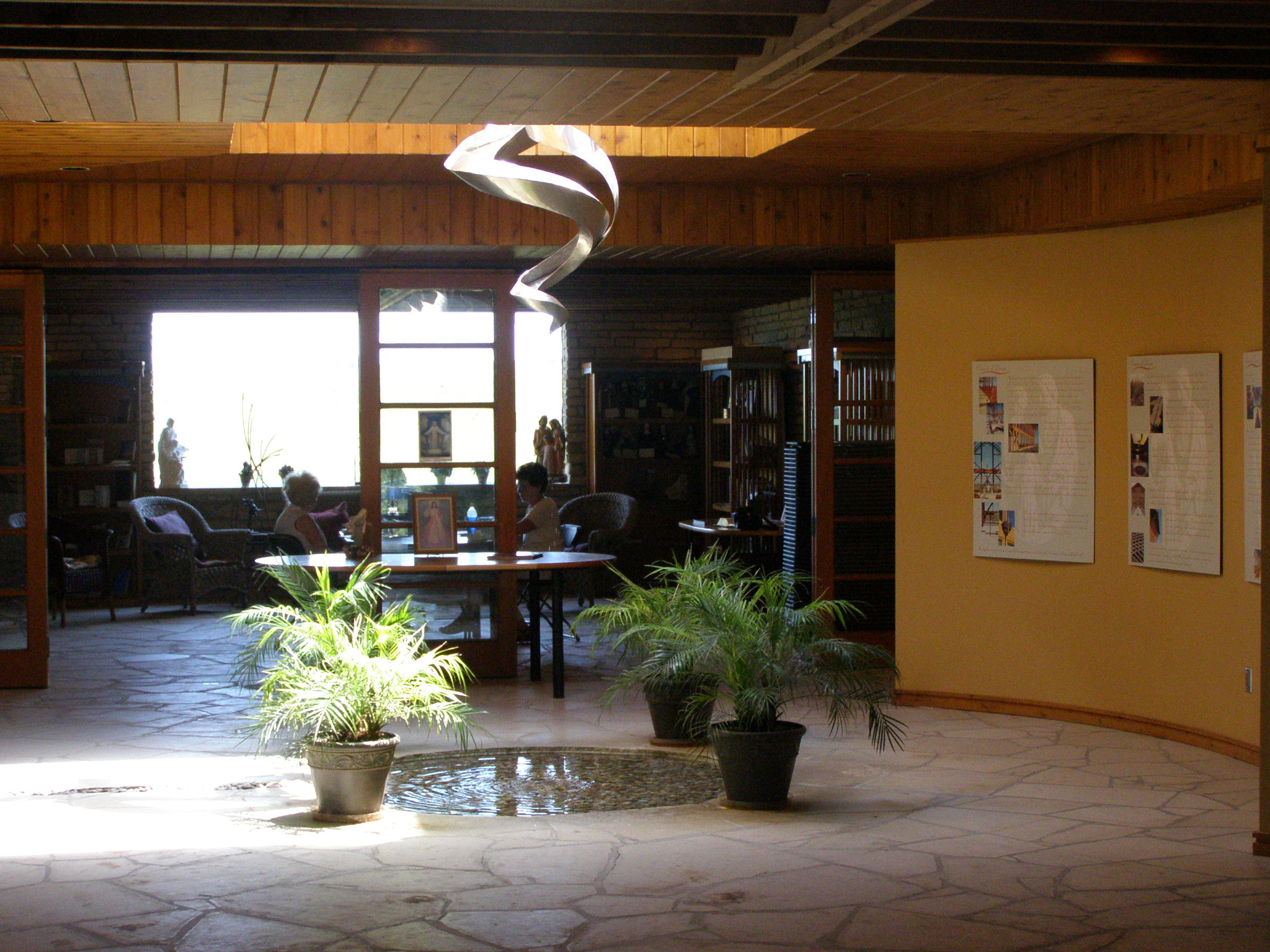
The interior of the visitor center, showing the shroud-like sculpture

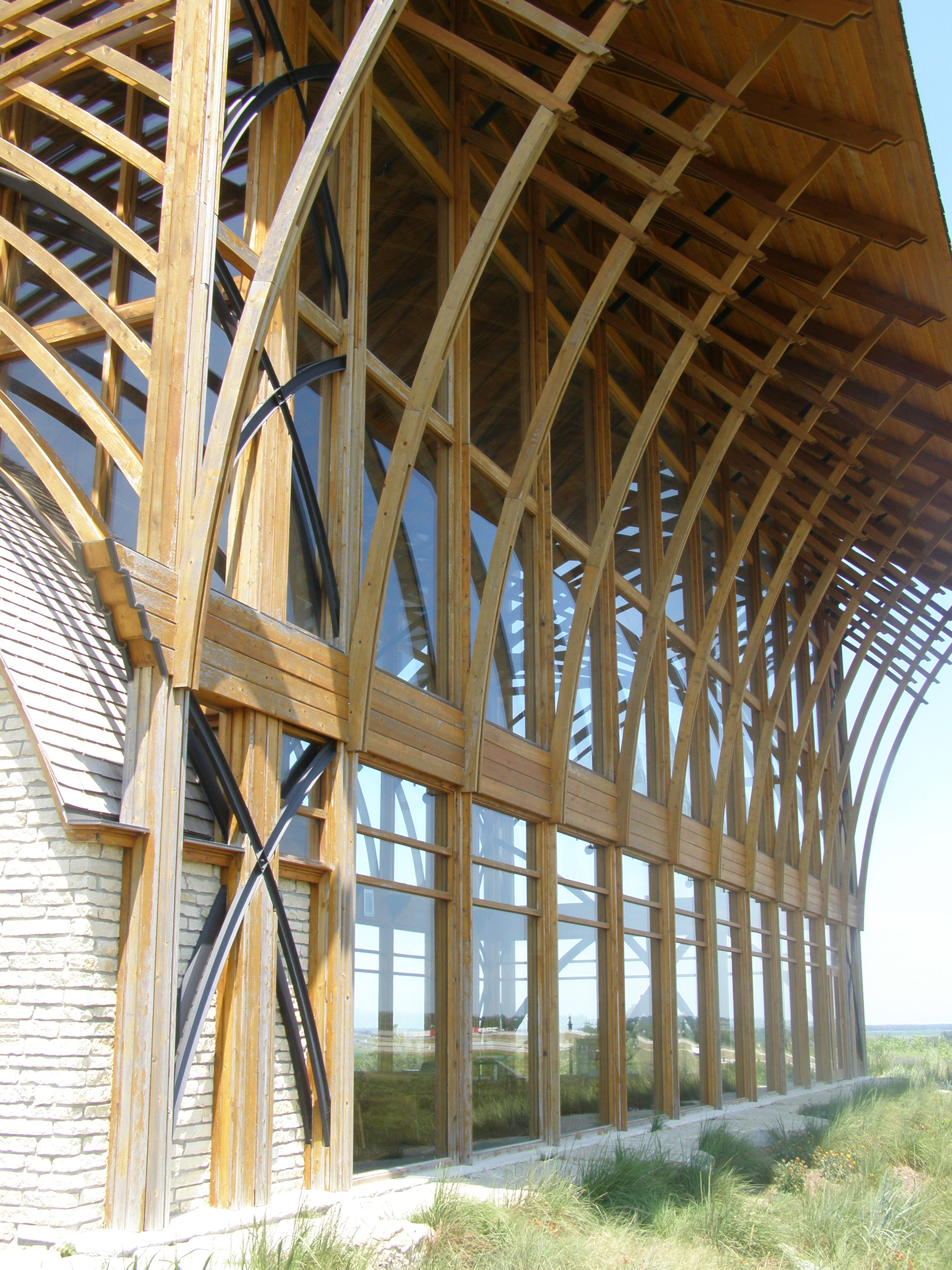
Detail: cedar beams and glass facade

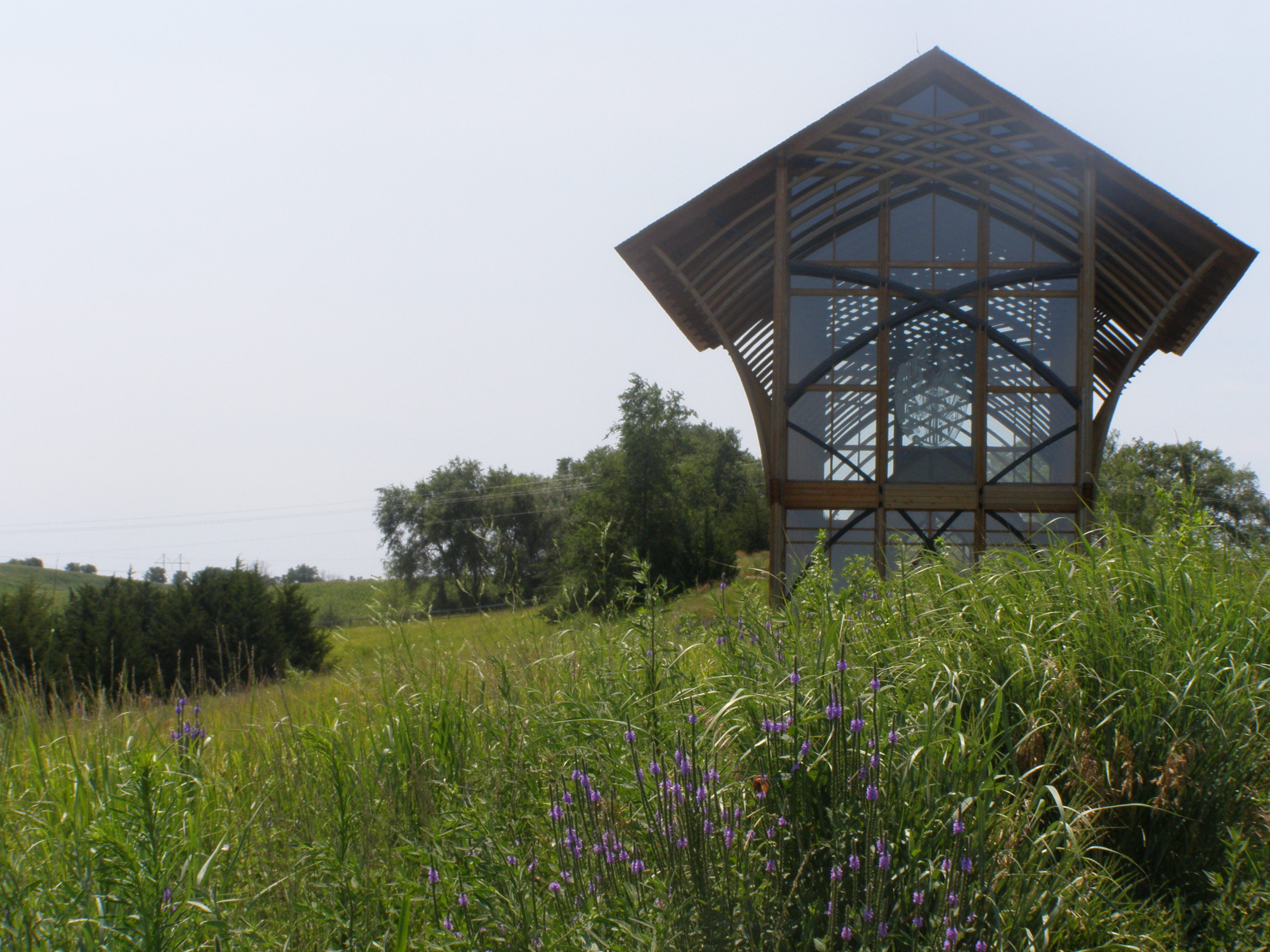

== See also ==
- Thorncrown Chapel (1980), designed by Jones in nearby Eureka Springs, Arkansas
- Mildred B. Cooper Memorial Chapel, similar chapel built by Jones in nearby Bella Vista, Arkansas
