= Thorncrown Chapel =

Chapel in Eureka Springs, Arkansas, US

- U.S. National Register of Historic Places
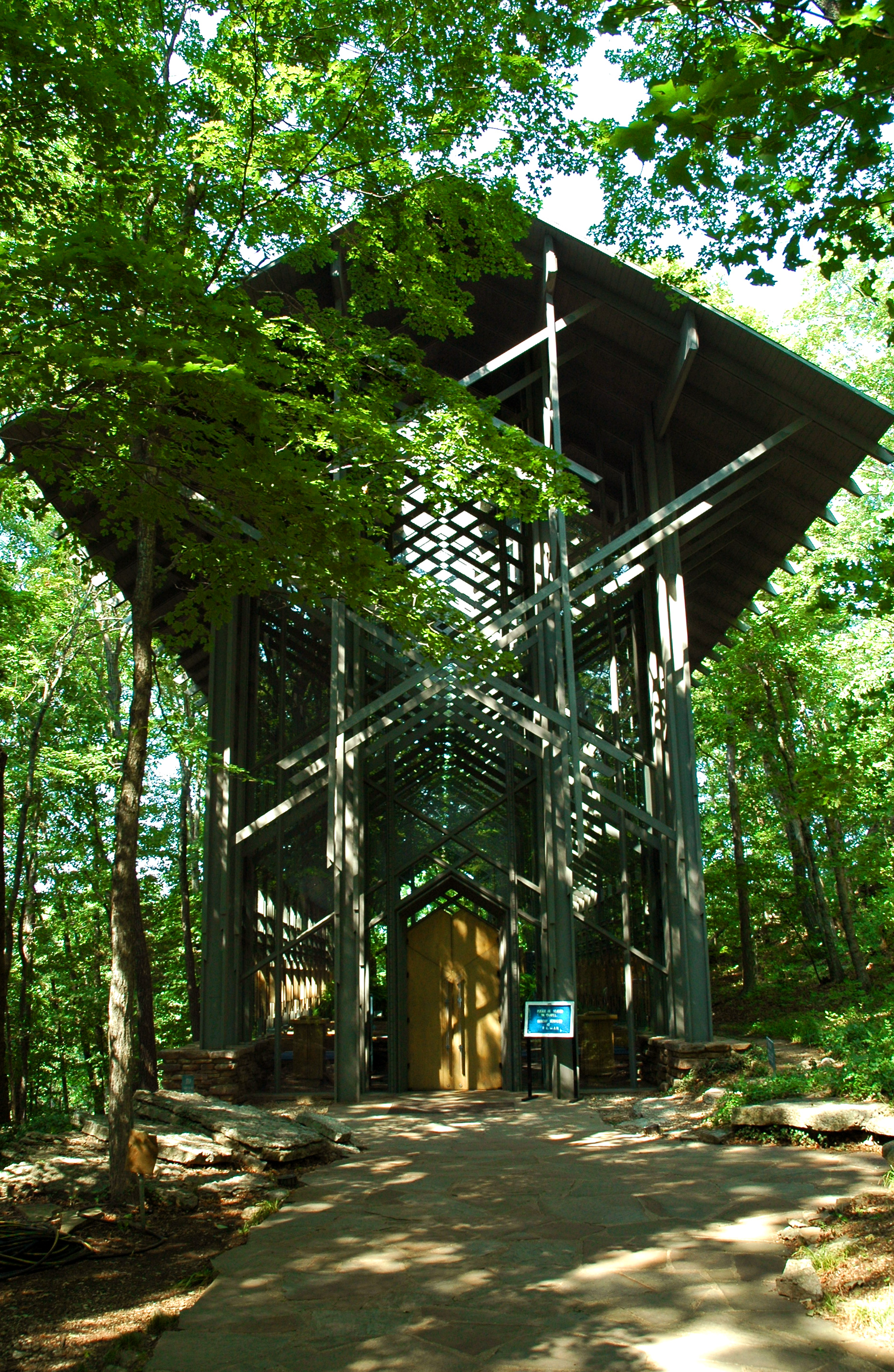

- Location within Arkansas Location within the United States
- Nearest city: Eureka Springs, Arkansas
- Coordinates: 36°24′59″N 93°46′22″W
- Area: 7.6 acres (3.1 ha)
- Built: 1980
- Architect: E. Fay Jones
- Architectural style: Modern
- MPS: Arkansas Designs of E. Fay Jones MPS AD
- NRHP reference No.: 97000452
- Added to NRHP: April 28, 2000

Thorncrown Chapel was designed by E. Fay Jones and constructed in Eureka Springs, Arkansas, in 1980. The design recalls the Prairie School of architecture popularized by Frank Lloyd Wright, with whom Jones had apprenticed. The chapel was commissioned by Jim Reed, a retired schoolteacher who envisioned a non-denominational pilgrimage chapel set apart for meditation. The design was inspired by Sainte-Chapelle, a Gothic church in Paris pierced by numerous stained glass windows. It held some of King Louis IX's medieval Christian relics, including the Crown of Thorns believed to have been worn by Christ. This relic inspired the name of the American chapel.

The chapel's unusual artistry has been recognized. It was selected for the 2006 Twenty-five Year Award by the American Institute of Architects. It was listed on the National Register of Historic Places (NRHP) in 2000, three decades before the 50-year cutoff required of most NRHP listings. It was included in Budget Travel's list of "12 Most Beautiful Churches in America" and Bored Panda's list of "50 Most Extraordinary Churches Of The World."

== Background ==
Retired schoolteacher Jim Reed bought land in 1971 where he intended to commission a non-denominational pilgrimage chapel near Eureka Springs, Arkansas. He wanted it to be set apart from the city for meditation in the forested landscape. He commissioned architect E. Fay Jones to design the project. Jones said that he was inspired in his design of Thorncrown Chapel by Sainte-Chapelle, a Gothic church in Paris, France that is known for its jewel-like interior, the result of its many narrow, stained-glass windows and different types of glass that allow light into the structure.

== Structure and status ==
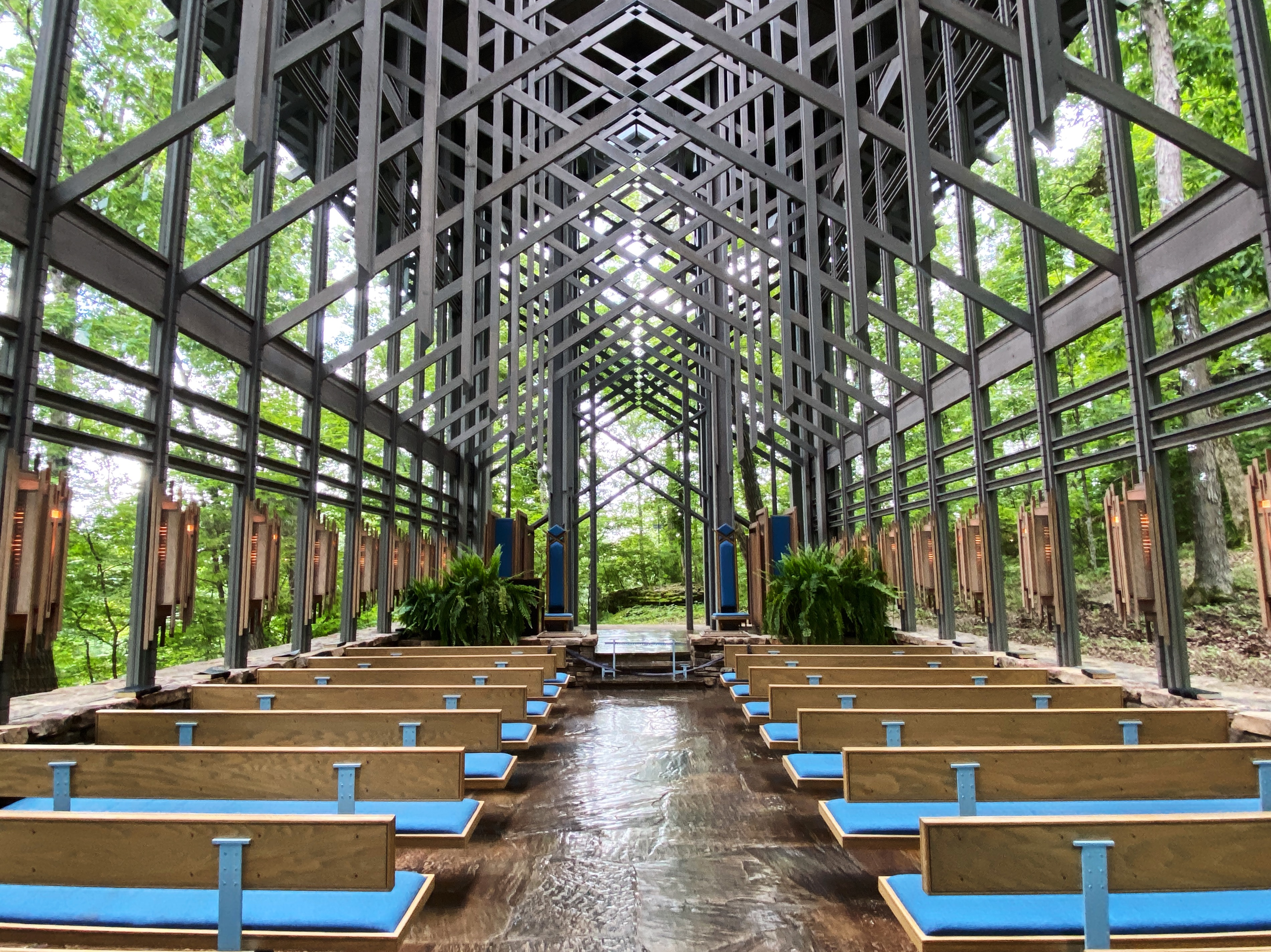
Interior

The chapel stands 48 feet (15 meters) high, 24 feet (7.3 meters) wide, and 60 feet (18 meters) long. It has 425 windows, which add up to 6,000 square feet (approximately 560 square meters) of glass. During the design process, Jones decided that in order to preserve the site's natural setting, no structural element could be larger than what two men could carry through the woods. The structure was constructed using organic materials indigenous to northwestern Arkansas, including pressure-treated Southern pine and flagstone for the floor and surrounding wall. The small ornamental roof skylight was later enlarged to provide additional natural lighting throughout the chapel.

The chapel looks like an open-air structure, but is, in fact, an enclosed air-conditioned space that seats up to 100 people. It is open daily from March to December with free admission. It is closed January and February except for weddings and other special events. Non-denominational church services are held in the adjoining worship center on Sundays from April to December.

== Honors and awards ==
The chapel was selected by the American Institute of Architects for the 2006 Twenty-five Year Award, recognizing works whose value has continued. It was listed on the National Register of Historic Places (NRHP) in 2000. The status was granted three decades before the 50-year cutoff required of most NRHP listings, which are typically not designated before that cutoff unless they are architecturally significant.

Budget Travel included the chapel in its list of "12 Most Beautiful Churches in America" Bored Panda has it on the list of "50 Most Extraordinary Churches Of The World."

== See also ==
- Mildred B. Cooper Memorial Chapel, similar chapel built by Jones in nearby Bella Vista, Arkansas
- Holy Family Shrine (2002), designed by Jim Dennel, Omaha
- National Register of Historic Places listings in Carroll County, Arkansas
