= Mildred B. Cooper Memorial Chapel =

Church in Bella Vista, Arkansas

Cooper Chapel
- Mildred B. Cooper Memorial Chapel
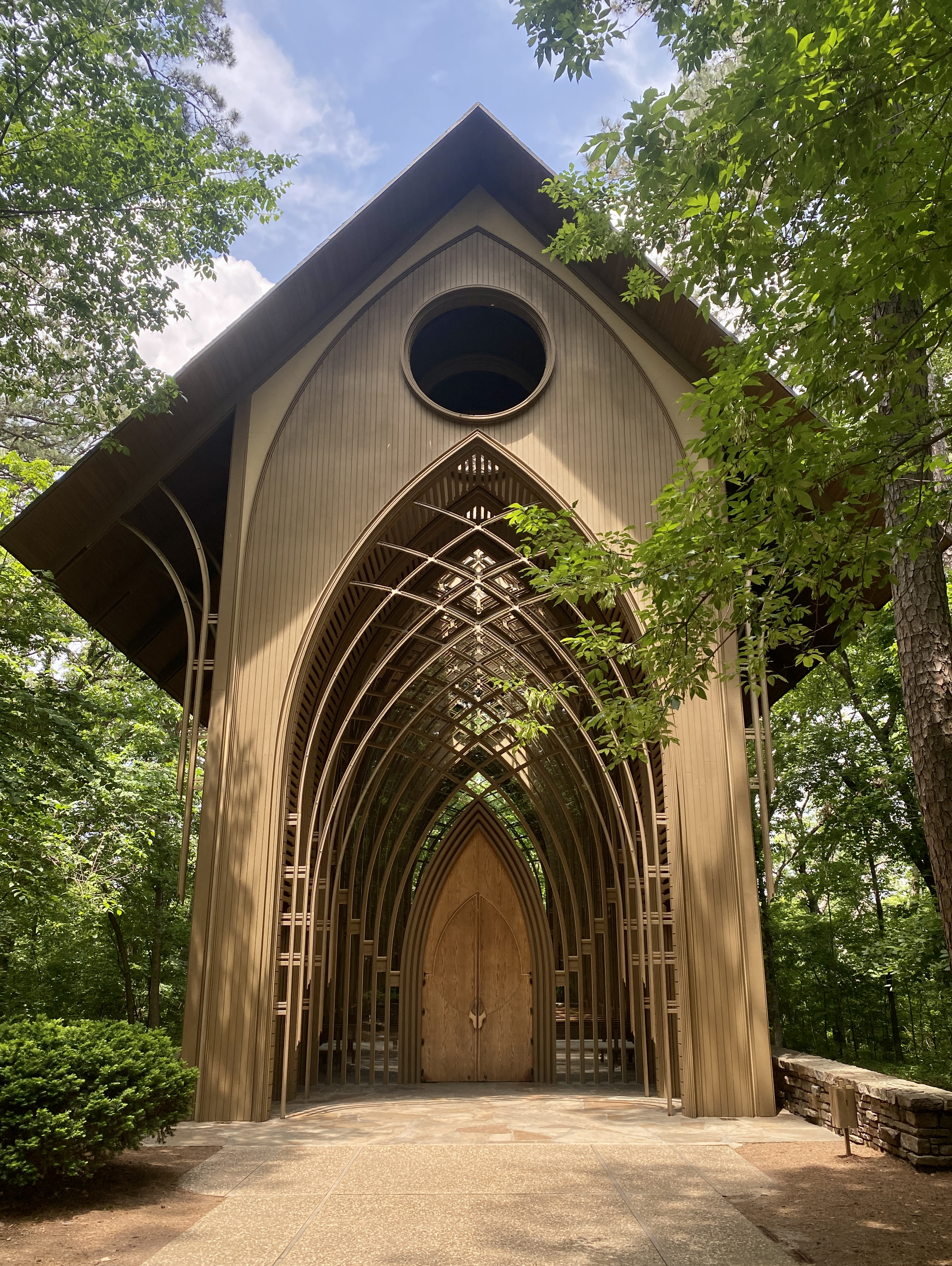
- Exterior of the chapel

- Location in Arkansas Cooper Chapel (the United States)
- 36°28′40″N 94°14′43″W
- Country: United States
- Website: www.cooperchapel.com

History
- Status: Open
- Founded: 1991
- Founder: Mildred B. Cooper Memorial Chapel Foundation

Architecture
- Heritage designation: Nominated to NRHP, June 5, 1996
- Architect: Fay Jones
- Architectural type: Moderne
- Style: Gothic (influences)
- Groundbreaking: 1988

Specifications
- Length: 84 feet (26 m)
- Width: 24 feet (7.3 m)
- Height: 54 feet (16 m)
- Materials: Steel, glass

Mildred B. Cooper Memorial Chapel is a chapel in Bella Vista, Arkansas, designed by E. Fay Jones and Maurice Jennings and constructed in 1988. The chapel was commissioned by John A. Cooper, Sr. to honor Mildred Borum Cooper, his late wife. The chapel was designed to celebrate both God and his creations.

Located on a wooded site along Lake Norwood, the chapel has become a popular tourist destination in Northwest Arkansas. It is also popular as a venue for wedding ceremonies.

== Architecture ==
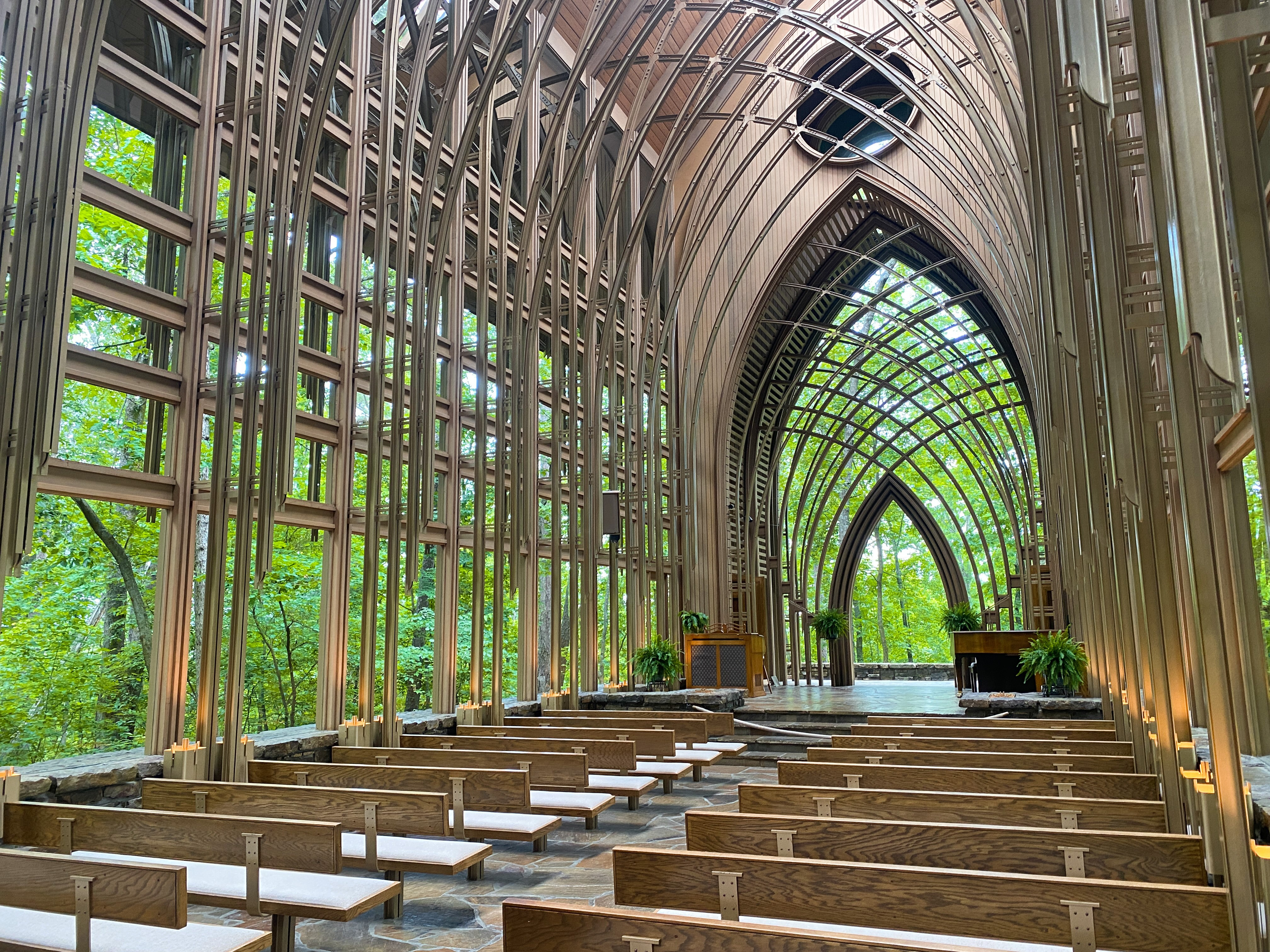
Interior view of the chapel

Jones apprenticed with Frank Lloyd Wright, and designed a building with numerous windows open to the landscape.

Jones used 31 tons of steel and 4,460 square feet of glass to create a series of tall, vertical Gothic arches that run the length of the chapel. Though it looks like an open-air structure, the chapel is glass-enclosed and air conditioned.

Soon after completion, the chapel was praised; a critic said that it "quietly commands a dignity and presence uncommon among buildings of our era."

== About Mildred Borum Cooper ==
Mildred Borum Cooper, born and raised in Arkansas, spent much of her life in service to her people and community. She was president of United Methodist Women's organizations, served in the Girl Scout organization, worked as postmistress, and organized the first garden club, home extension club, and library in Cherokee Village.

== See also ==
- Thorncrown Chapel (1980), designed by Jones in nearby Eureka Springs, Arkansas
- Holy Family Shrine (2002), designed by Jim Dennel, Omaha
