= Shiloh Church (Springdale, Arkansas) =

Historic church in Arkansas, United States

- U.S. National Register of Historic Places
- U.S. Historic district – Contributing property
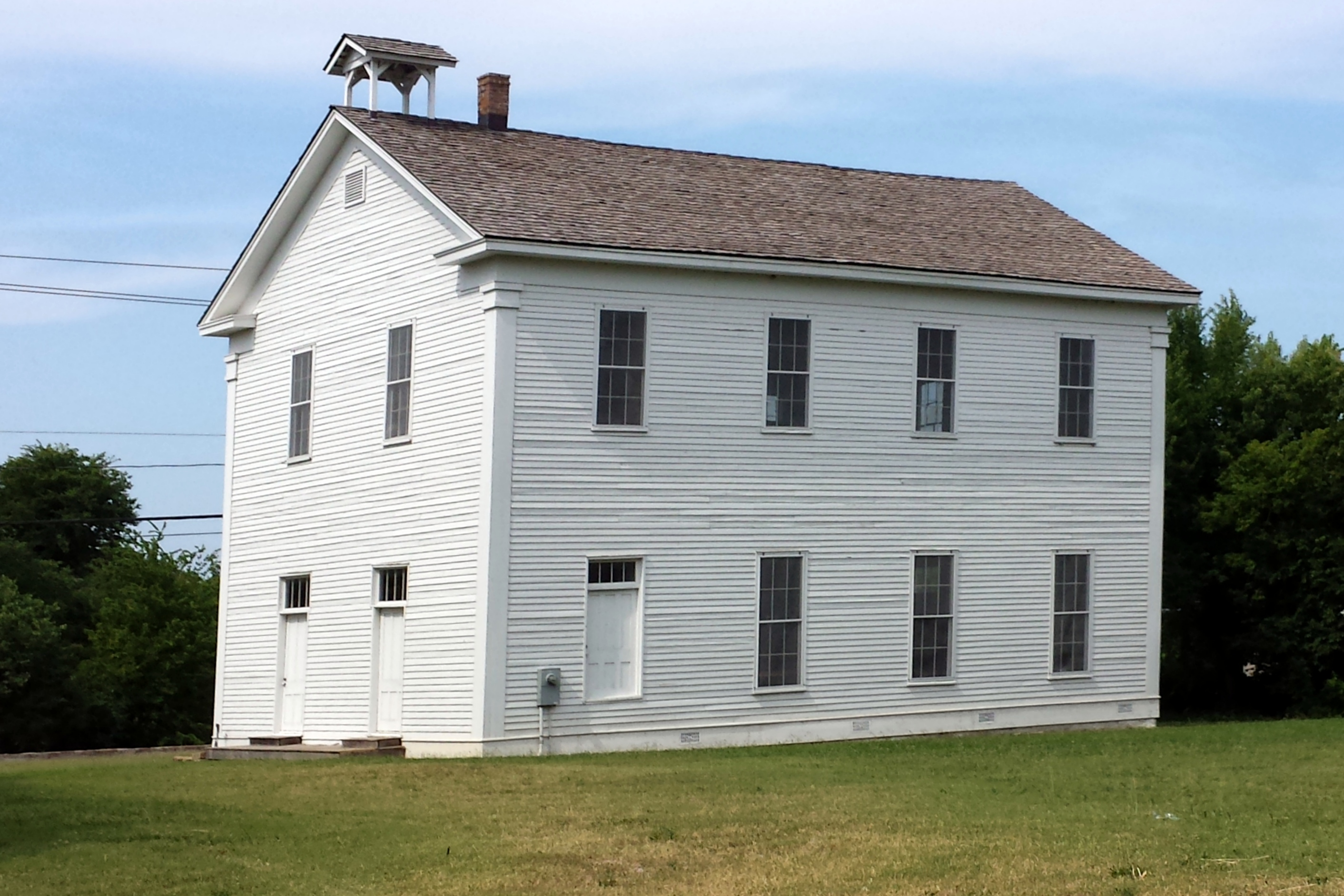

- Location within Arkansas Location within the United States
- Location: Huntsville and Main Sts. Springdale, Arkansas
- Coordinates: 36°11′17″N 94°7′52″W
- Area: 0.8 acres (0.32 ha)
- Built: 1870
- Architectural style: Greek Revival
- Part of: Shiloh Historic District (ID78000640)
- NRHP reference No.: 75000418

Significant dates
- Added to NRHP: June 5, 1975
- Designated CP: August 31, 1978

Shiloh Church is a historic church at Huntsville and Main Streets in Springdale, Arkansas. It is a two-story wood-frame structure, finished with wooden clapboards and topped by a gable roof with a small belfry. Decoration is relatively plain, with pilastered corners, a plain entablature along the side walls, and transom windows above the pair of entrances on the main facade. Built in 1870, it is the oldest surviving building in Springdale. It was used for many years as both a church (by multiple denominations) and the local Masonic lodge. By the late 1920s it had been abandoned by all of these users, and was acquired in 1932 by the local chapter of the International Order of Odd Fellows (IOOF), which used it as its lodge. The IOOF chapter deeded the building to the city in 2005.

The church was listed on the National Register of Historic Places in 1975.

== See also ==
- National Register of Historic Places listings in Washington County, Arkansas
