= Natalie Smith Henry =

American painter

- self-portrait, 1930s
- Born: Natalie Smith Henry; January 4, 1907; Malvern, Arkansas
- Died: February 20, 1992 (aged 85); Malvern, Arkansas

Natalie Smith Henry (January 4, 1907 – February 20, 1992) was an American artist who worked mostly in Chicago. She is best known for her Depression-era post office murals commissioned by the United States Department of the Treasury.

== Early life and education ==
Natalie Smith Henry was the first of five children born to Natalie Smith and Samuel Ewell Henry, a circuit clerk and Hot Spring County judge. Henry's interest in art first began at age twelve following the death of her mother. Although her interest began as a creative way to channel her grief, at age fifteen Henry began formally studying illustration at the International Correspondence Schools of Scranton, Pennsylvania.

Following her graduation from Malvern High School in 1925, Henry attended Galloway College before moving to Illinois in 1928 to attend the prestigious School of the Art Institute of Chicago. In 1937, after taking classes part-time for several years, Henry finally earned a four-year degree from the Hubert Ropp School of Art. Henry paid her school tuition by serving as Ropp's recordkeeper and working part-time as a typist at the Ryerson Library from 1931 to 1942.

== Career ==
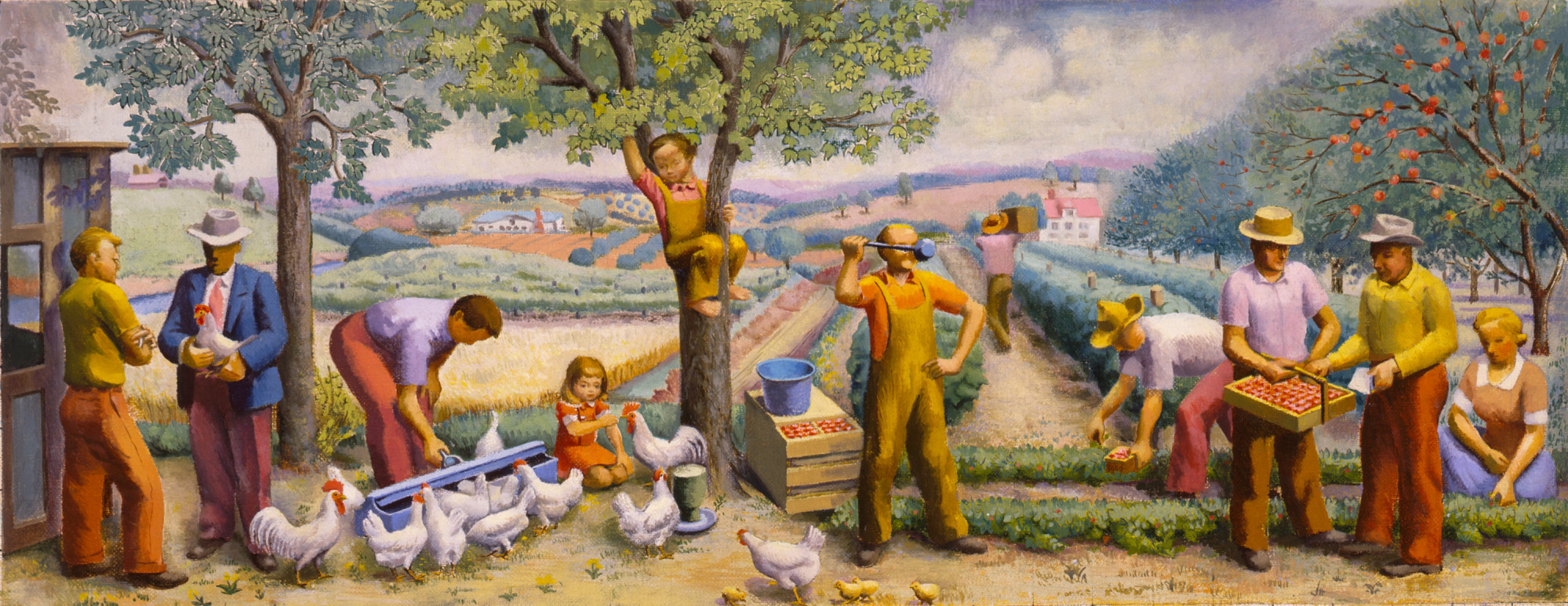
Study for Local Industries (1940), Smith's post office mural in Springdale, Arkansas

Henry first began displaying her work at a national level in 1935, when she exhibited Picnic at the Annual Exhibition of Artists of Chicago and Vicinity. The following year, Man with Shells was shown alongside the work of notable European and American artists Wassily Kandinsky, Edward Hopper, and Wood.

In addition to her part-time work as an artist, Henry also contributed to the Federal Art Project of the Works Project Administration by producing murals for private clients. In 1939 the Section of Painting and Sculpture of the United States Department of the Treasury commissioned her to paint a mural for the Springdale, Arkansas Post Office. This mural, titled Local Industries, was well received by those suffering from the effects of the Great Depression.

In 1944, Henry joined the Chicago Society of Artists and annually submitted work there until 1987. Throughout her career, her work was exhibited in galleries throughout Chicago, including the Art Institute of Chicago, the Chicago Society of Artists, the Chicago Women's Salon, and The Renaissance Society.

Despite her artistic success, the unmarried Henry still struggled financially. After several years of part-time secretarial positions, Henry worked for Office of Price Administration–Rent Division from 1942 to 1943. After working in commercial art from 1943 to 1948, Henry became the manager of the Art Institute of Chicago School Store, a position she held until 1972. During her time as manager, Henry also earned money by designing woodblocks and making greeting cards for the Chicago Society of Artists.

For many years Henry shared an apartment with Rowena Fry at the Lambert Tree Studios building, and Henry depicted her in the watercolor Rowena Washing Her Hair sometime during the 1930s.

== Death and legacy ==
Henry returned to her hometown of Malvern, Arkansas in 1985 and remained there until her death in 1992. Fry came to live with her in 1989, dying the next year. Currently, her works are held in the Smithsonian American Art Museum in Washington, D.C. and the Shiloh Museum of Ozark History in Springdale, Arkansas.
