= Shiloh Historic District =

Historic district in Arkansas, United States

- U.S. National Register of Historic Places
- U.S. Historic district
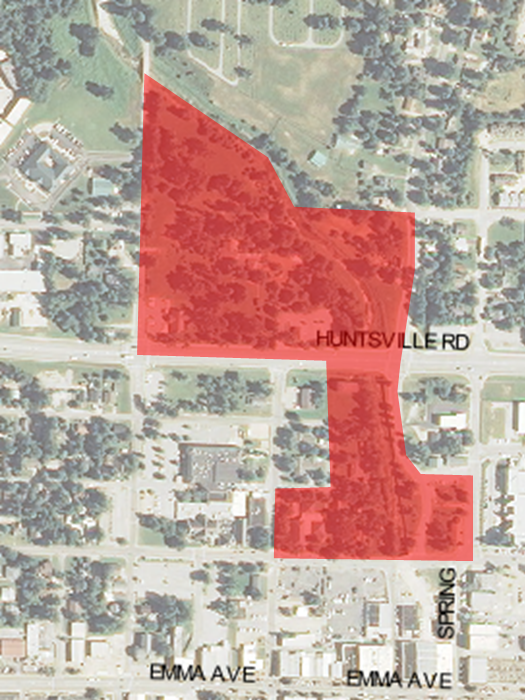
- Location: Roughly bounded by Spring Creek, Shiloh, Johnson, Mill, and Spring Sts., Springdale, Arkansas
- Coordinates: 36°11′19″N 94°7′53″W
- Area: 32 acres (13 ha)
- Architectural style: Late 19th And 20th Century Revivals, Late Victorian
- NRHP reference No.: 78000640
- Added to NRHP: August 31, 1978

Shiloh Historic District is a historic area of downtown Springdale, Arkansas listed on the National Register of Historic Places. The district encompasses eighteen significant buildings within its 32 acres (13 ha), with eight having historic or architectural significance and twelve relating to the early commercial and industrial development of Springdale. Also included within the area are several roads of historic significance to the city. The district covers an area straddling Spring Brook, around which the community developed beginning in the 1830s, and is roughly centered on the 1870 Shiloh Church building, which is the community's oldest surviving building.

== Contributing properties ==
- Shiloh Church
- Berry-Braun House
- Smith-Searcy House
- Steele Store
- Springdale Library-Shiloh Museum of Ozark History
- Bookout House
- Berry-Braun Cottage
- American Legion Hut

== See also ==
- National Register of Historic Places listings in Washington County, Arkansas
