= Arvest Ballpark =

Stadium in Springdale, Arkansas

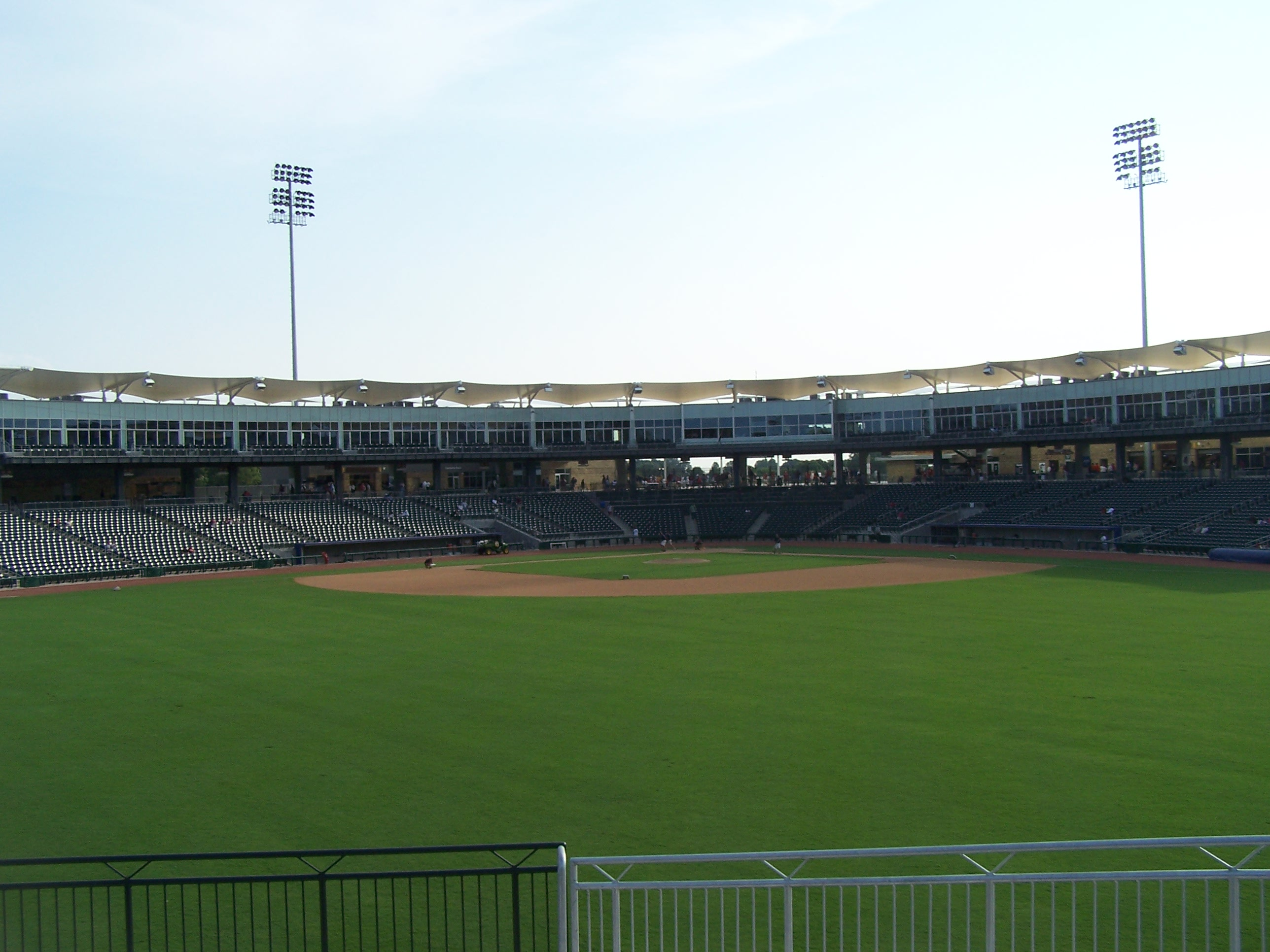

- Location within Arkansas Location within the United States
- Location: 3000 South 56th Street; Springdale, Arkansas, 72762
- Coordinates: 36°9′33″N 94°11′42″W
- Owner: City of Springdale
- Operator: Rich Baseball Operations
- Capacity: 7,305 (5,353 fixed seats)
- Surface: Patriot bermuda overseeded with rye
- Field size: Left Field: 325 feet (99 m); Center Field: 400 feet (122 m); Right Field: 325 feet (99 m)

Construction
- Groundbreaking: February 28, 2007; 19 years ago
- Opened: April 10, 2008; 18 years ago
- Cost: $50 million ($74.8 million in 2025 dollars)
- Architect: Populous
- Structural engineer: Thornton Tomasetti
- Services engineer: Henderson Engineers
- General contractor: Crossland Construction
- Main contractor: John McBride Construction Company Inc.

Tenant
- Northwest Arkansas Naturals (TL) (2008–present)

Arvest Ballpark is a stadium in Springdale, Arkansas. It is primarily used for baseball, as the home of the Northwest Arkansas Naturals of the Texas League. The ballpark has a capacity of 7,305 people and opened in 2008. Arvest Ballpark was designed by the Kansas City architecture firm Populous. Arvest Ballpark was named the 2008 Ballpark of the year by baseballparks.com

== History ==
The Wichita Wranglers were the Double-A affiliate of the San Diego Padres from 1987 to 1994 and the Kansas City Royals from 1995 to 2007. The Wranglers had struggled with low attendance numbers and an aging Lawrence–Dumont Stadium throughout Bob Rich Jr.'s 18-year ownership of the team. In 2006, Rich sought to move the team to Springdale, contingent on a citizen vote to approve financing for a new stadium.

Springdale's mayor, Jerre M. Van Hoose, and the head of the Chamber of Commerce, Perry Webb, knew what it would take to bring the affiliated Minor Leagues to the area. Not only would they have to find a team willing to move, they would also need to provide them with a better facility than what they would be leaving behind. The referendum concerning a new ballpark was held on July 11, 2006, with voters approving by a narrow margin the continuation of a 1% sales tax to fund construction of the ballpark.

Ground for the ballpark was broken on February 27, 2007. Construction was performed by Crossland Construction and completed in April 2008. On September 10, 2007, a naming rights deal was reached with Arvest Bank Group, Inc. of nearby Bentonville, and the new ballpark's official name was introduced as Arvest Ballpark on October 5, 2007.

The first game played at Arvest Ballpark was the 2008 opening day game between the Naturals and the San Antonio Missions on April 10, 2008. The Naturals lost 7-1 in front of a sellout crowd of 7,820.

== Images ==
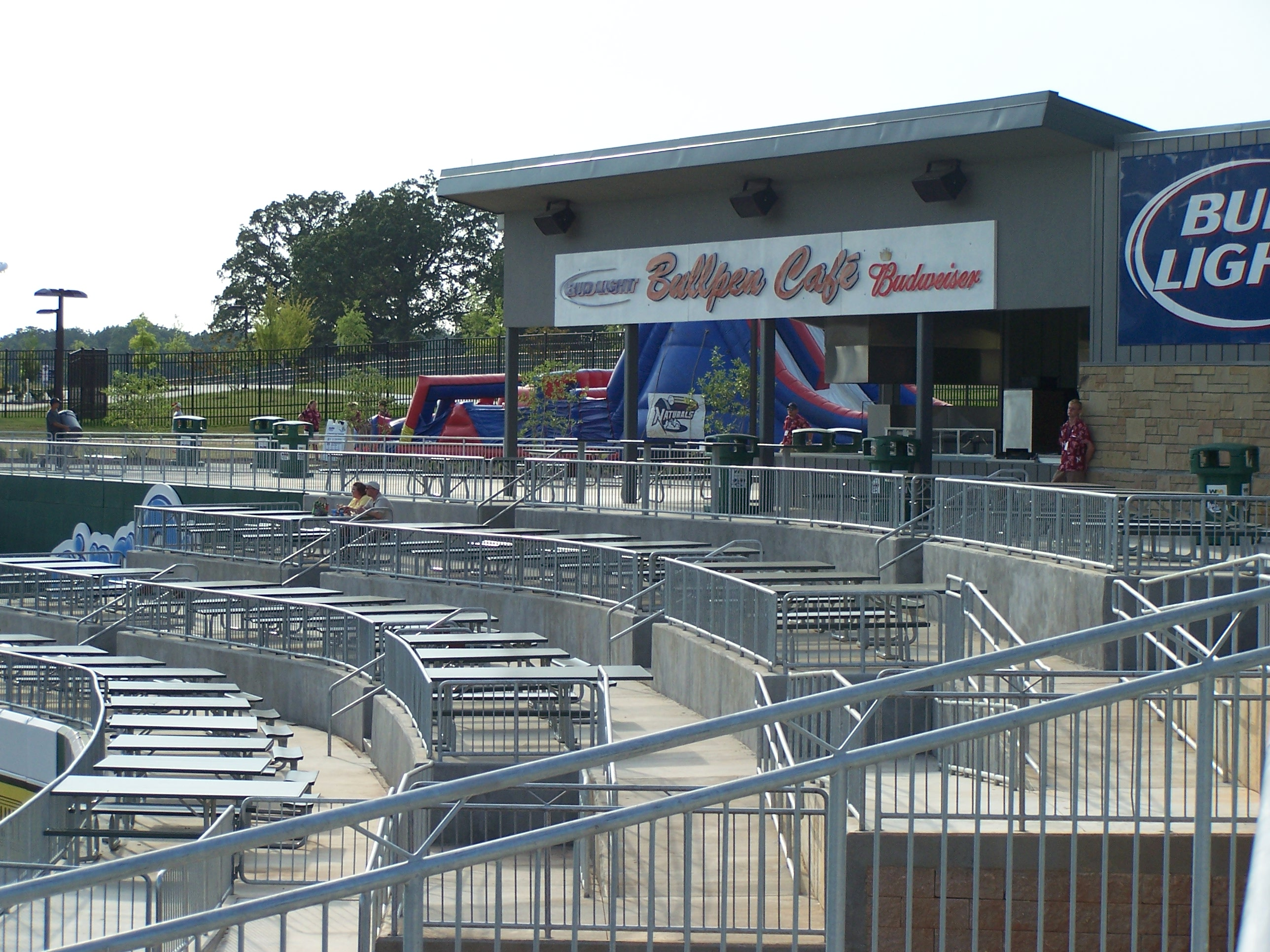
Arvest Ballpark Bullpen Cafè, located beyond left field

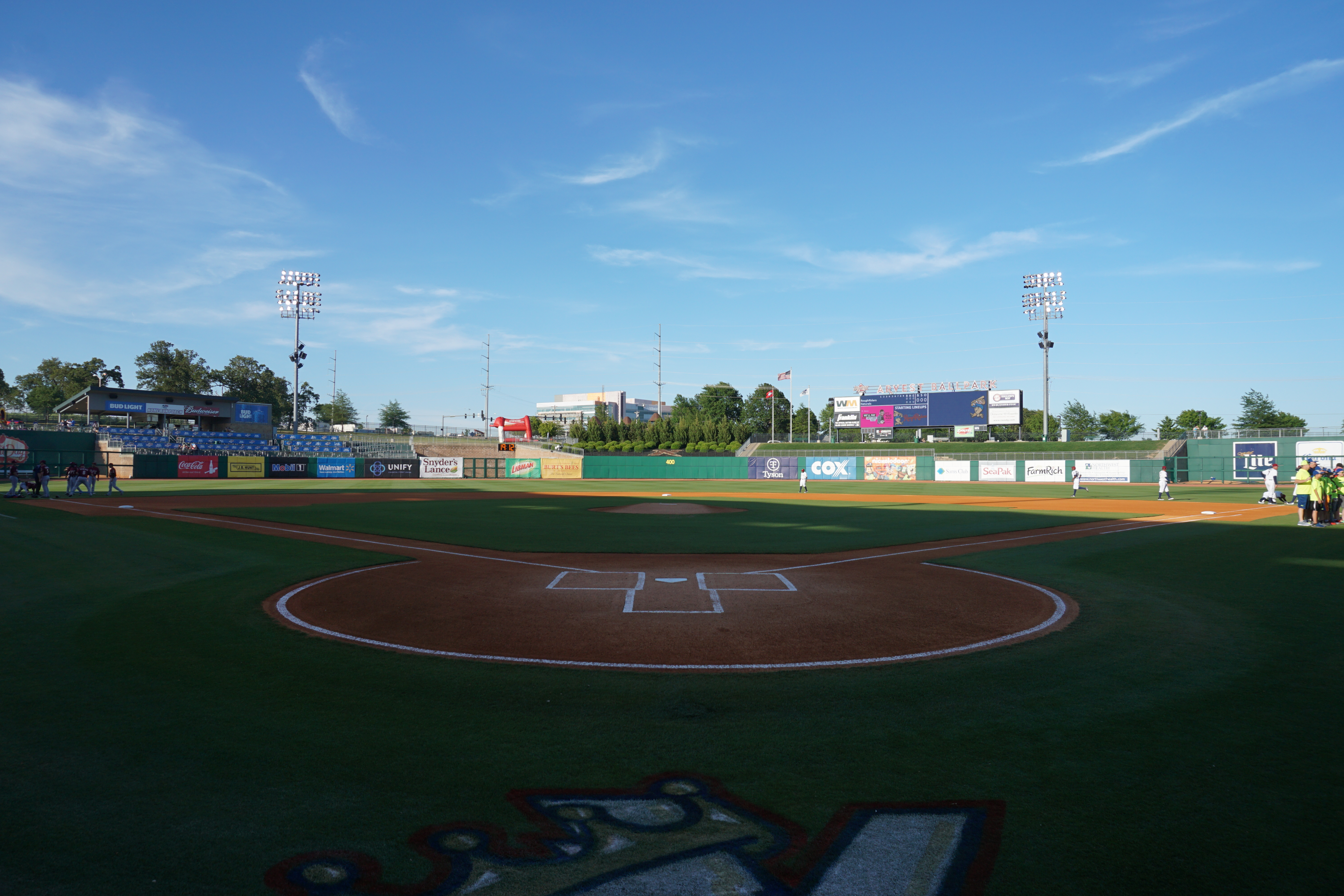
View from behind home plate

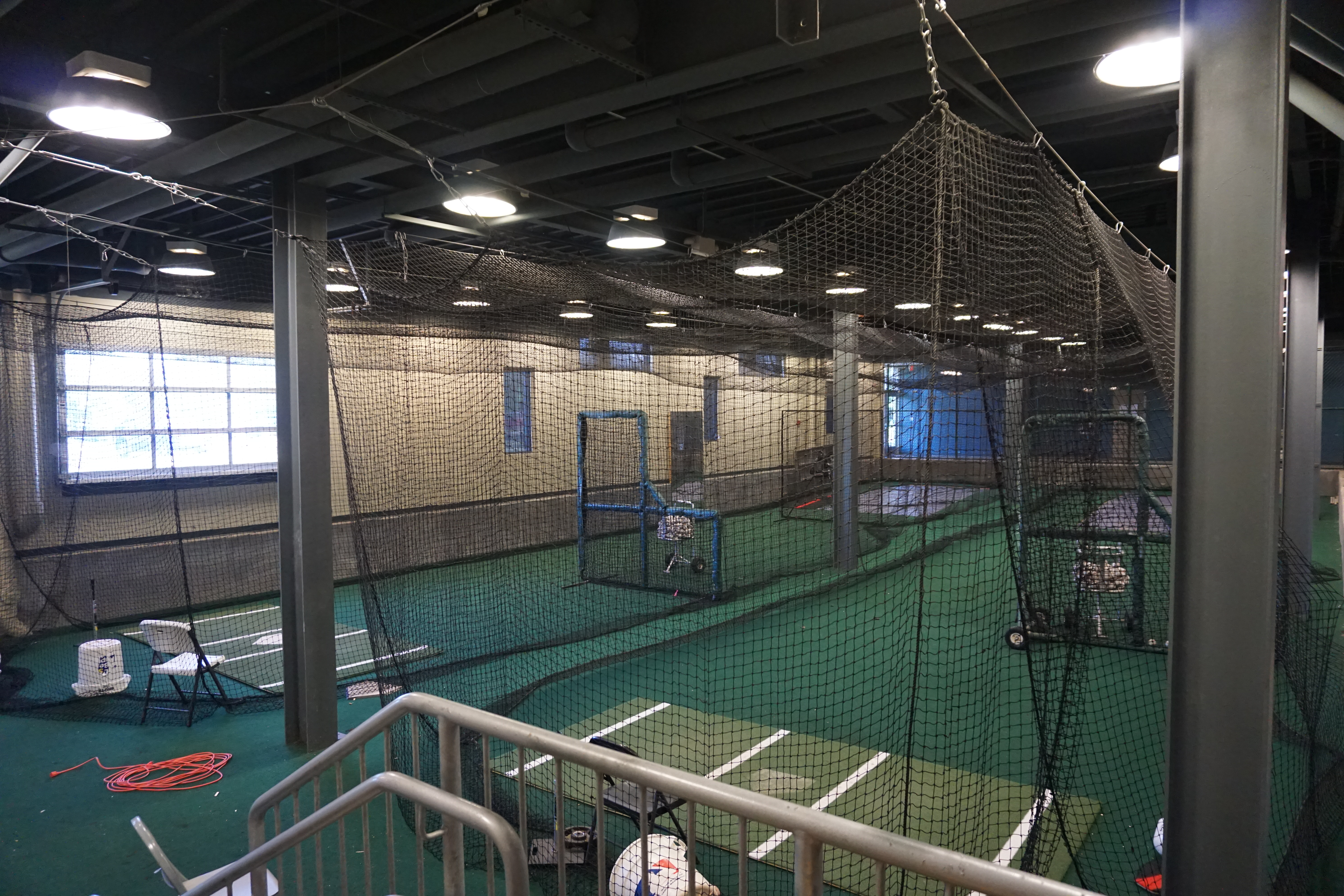
Batting cages

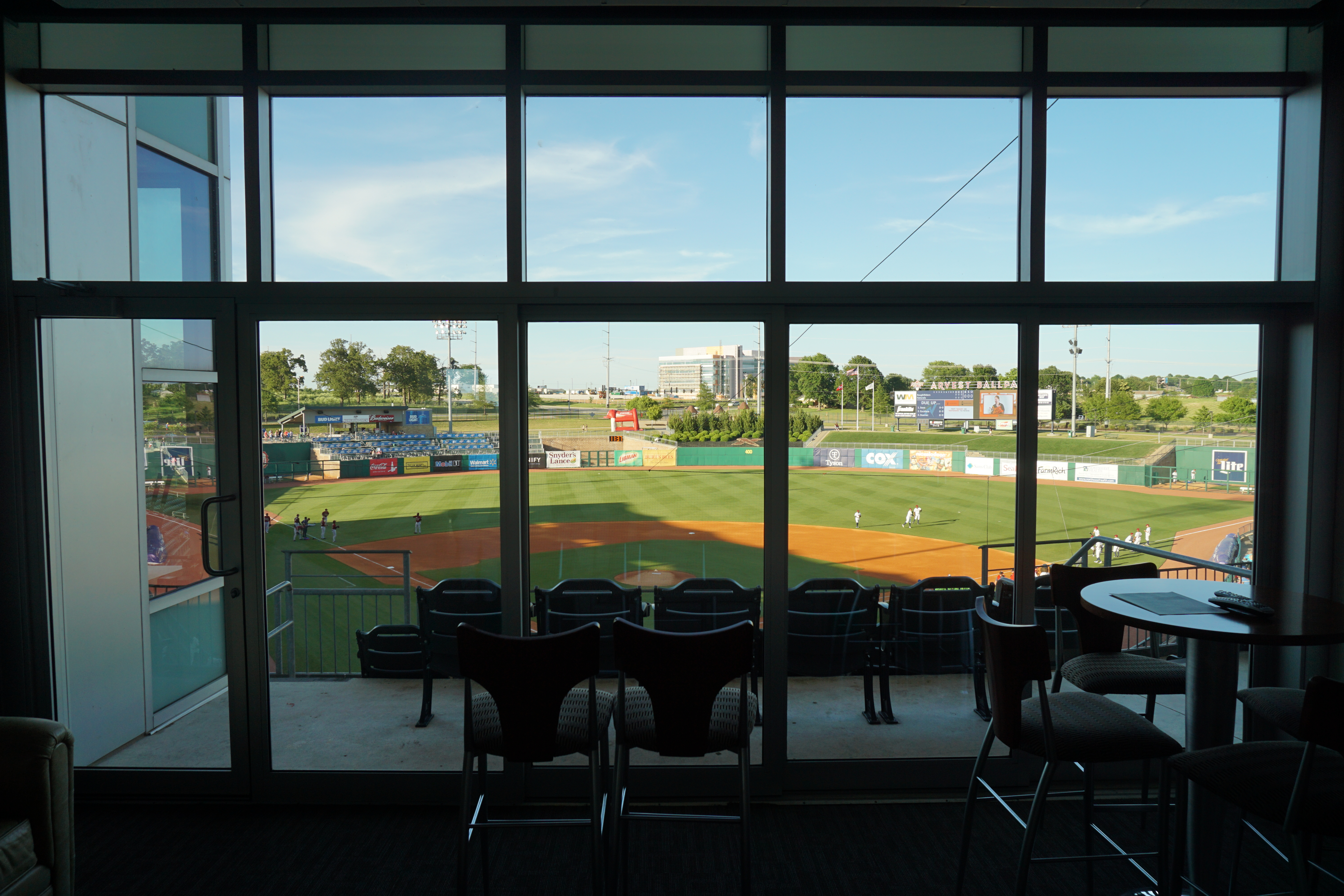
Luxury suite

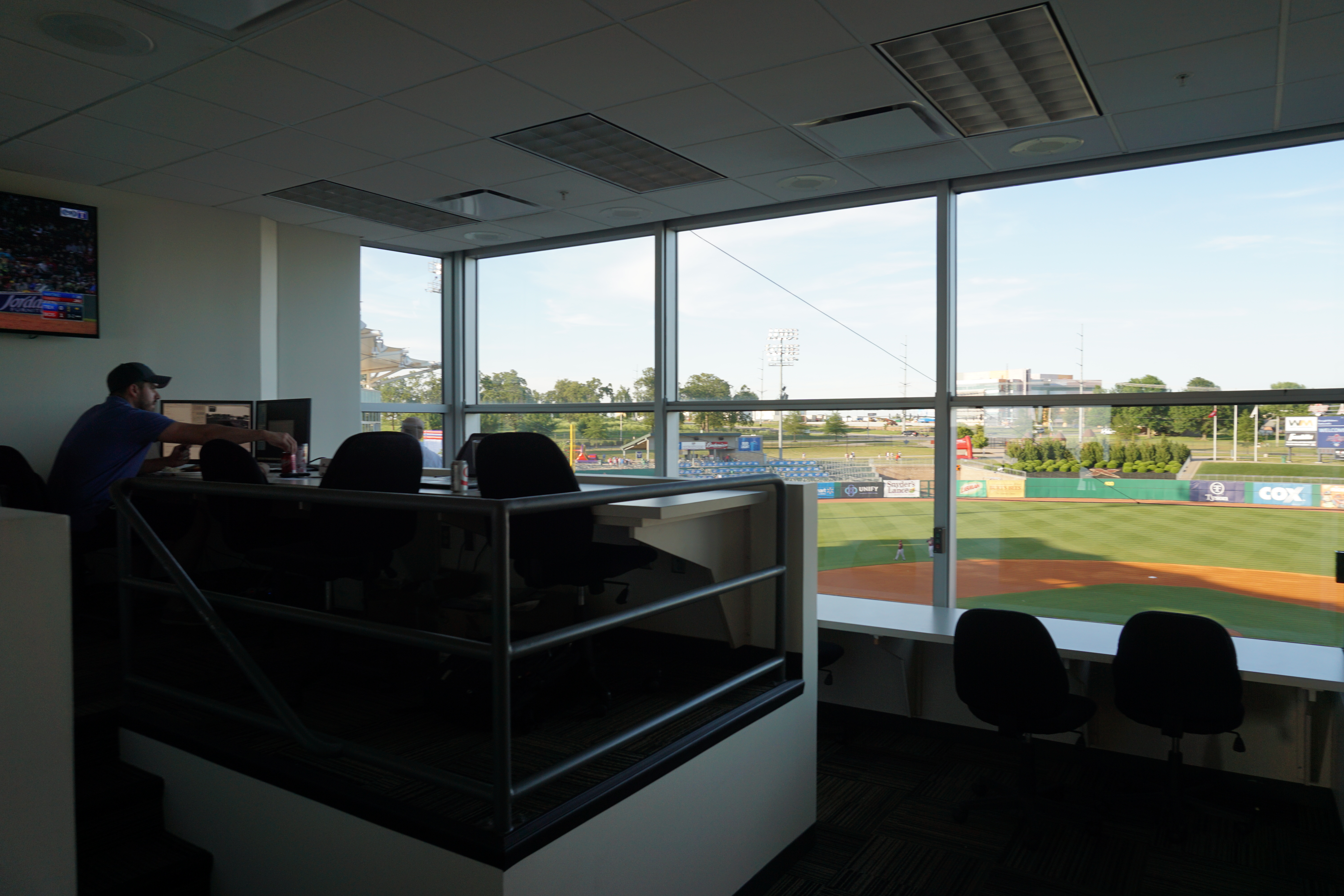
Press box
