= Rowena Fry =

American painter

Rowena Fry

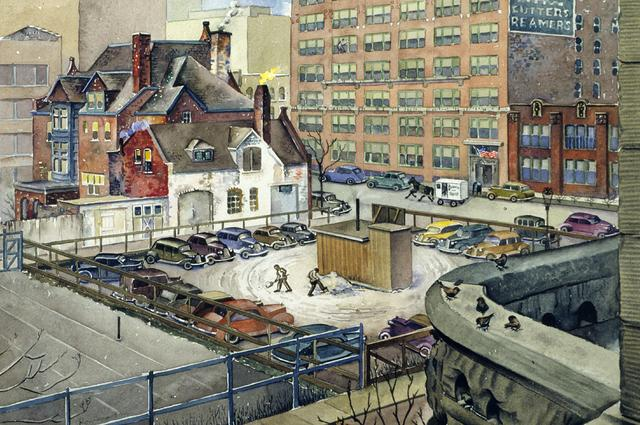
The Parking Lot, circa 1939

Rowena Fry (October 27, 1900 – November 2, 1990) was an American painter.

Born in Athens, Alabama, Fry studied at the Watkins Institute in Nashville before coming to Chicago in the late 1920s. There she studied at the School of the Art Institute of Chicago and the Hubert Ropp School of Art. From 1938 to 1939 she was involved as a muralist with the Works Progress Administration, producing work at Abbott Laboratories, Oscar Mayer, and the American Marietta Paint Company. She taught painting and serigraphy from her studio for many years, and from 1942 to 1946 she taught art at the Great Lakes Naval Hospital.

For many years she shared an apartment with Natalie Smith Henry at the Lambert Tree Studios building, and Henry depicted her in the watercolor Rowena Washing Her Hair sometime during the 1930s. Fry went to Malvern, Arkansas to live with Henry later in life. She died there, survived by two sisters, and is buried in the town's Oak Ridge Cemetery; her grave marker gives a date of birth of October 27, 1900. Fry's work is in the collection of the Illinois State Museum. A collection of the two women's papers was digitized by the Archives of American Art at the Smithsonian Institution.
