= Springdale, Arkansas =

- City
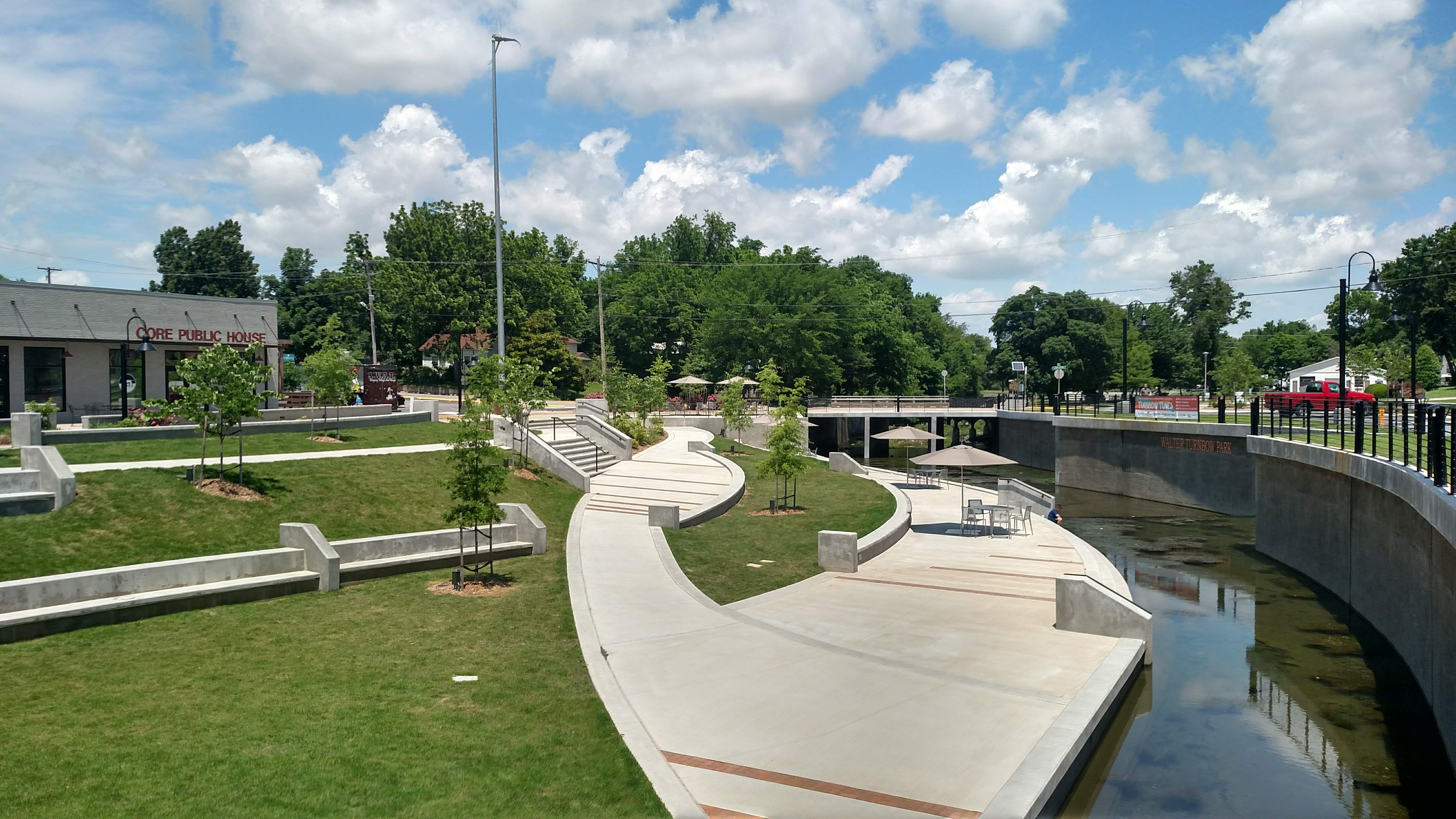
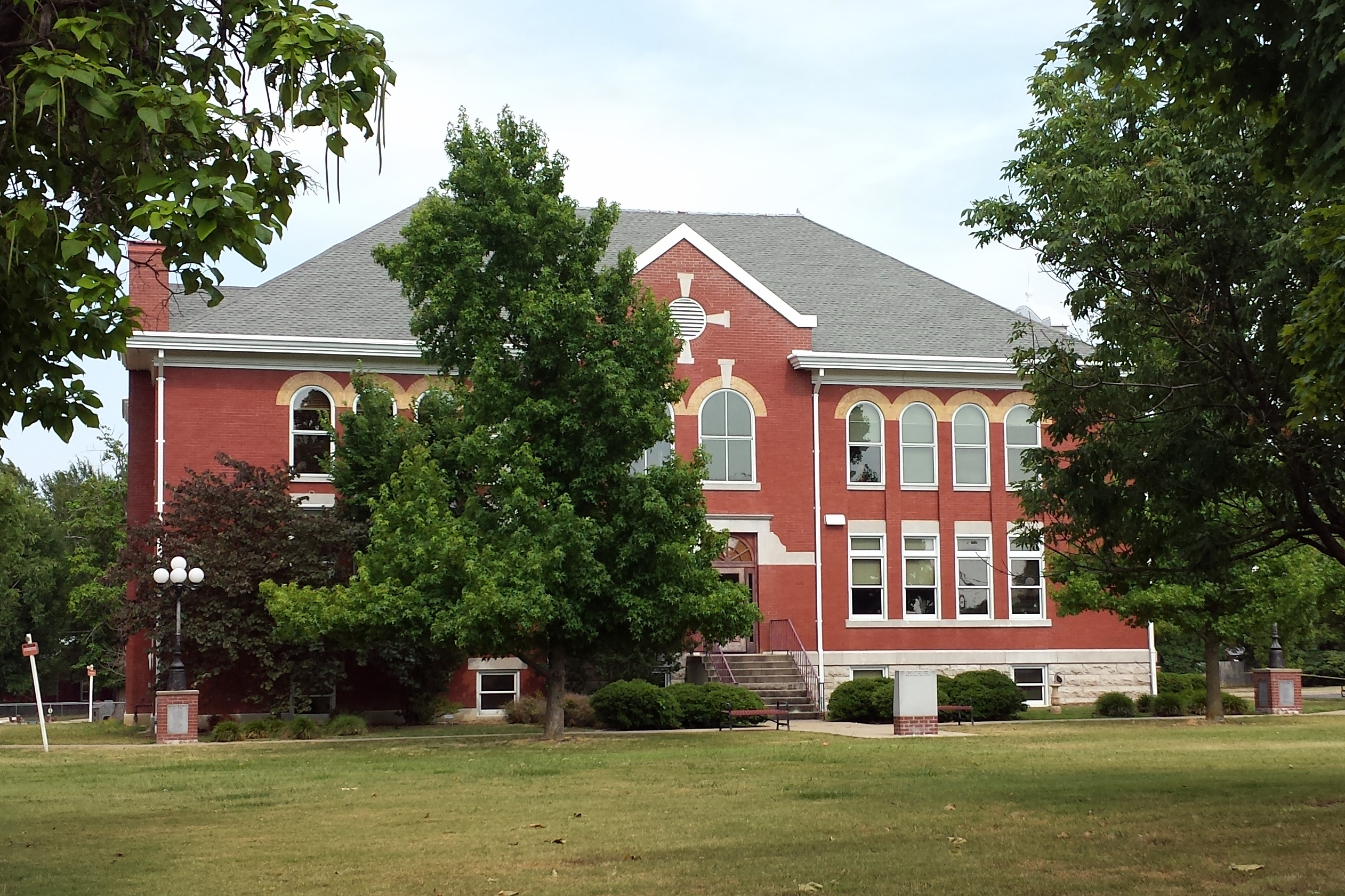
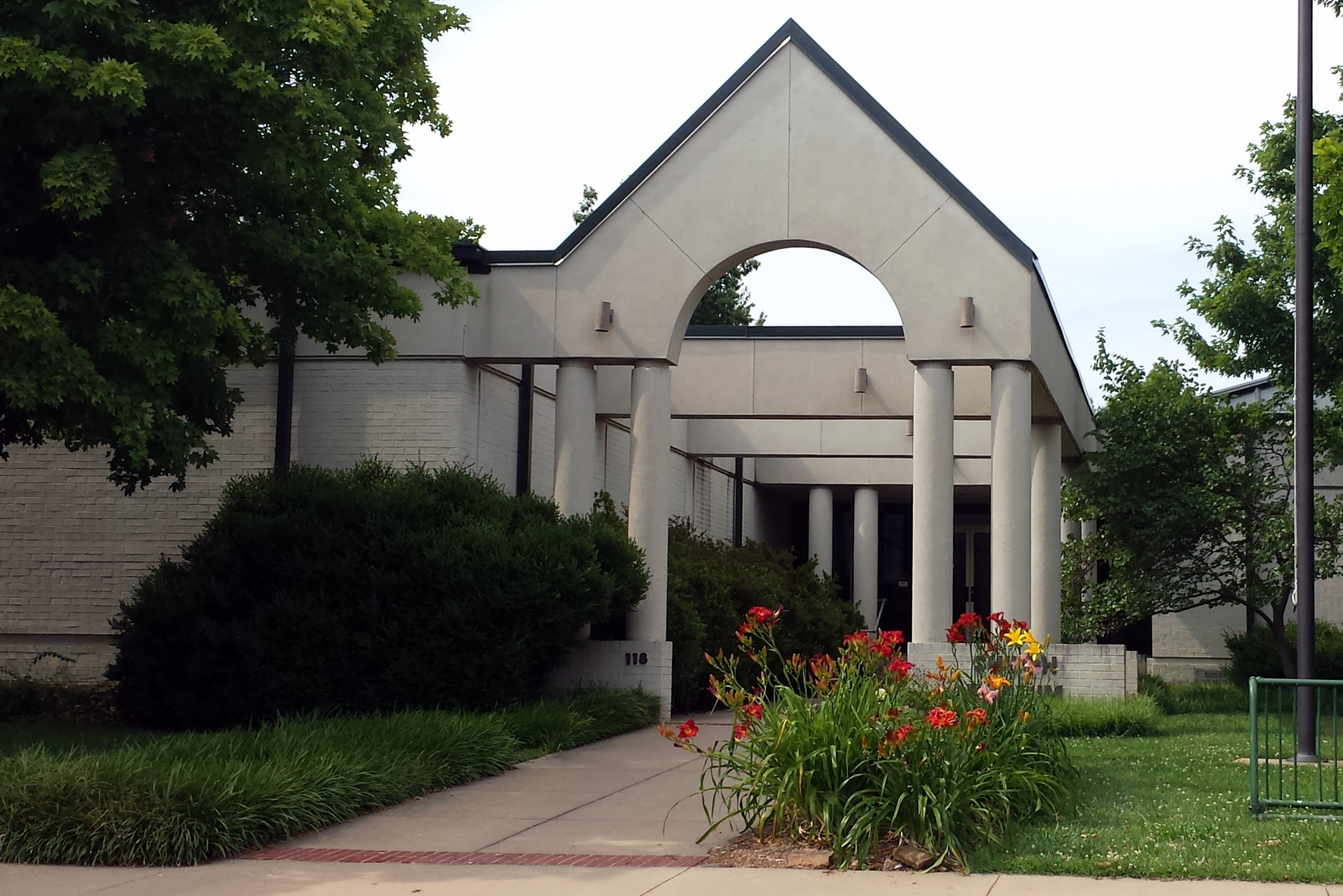
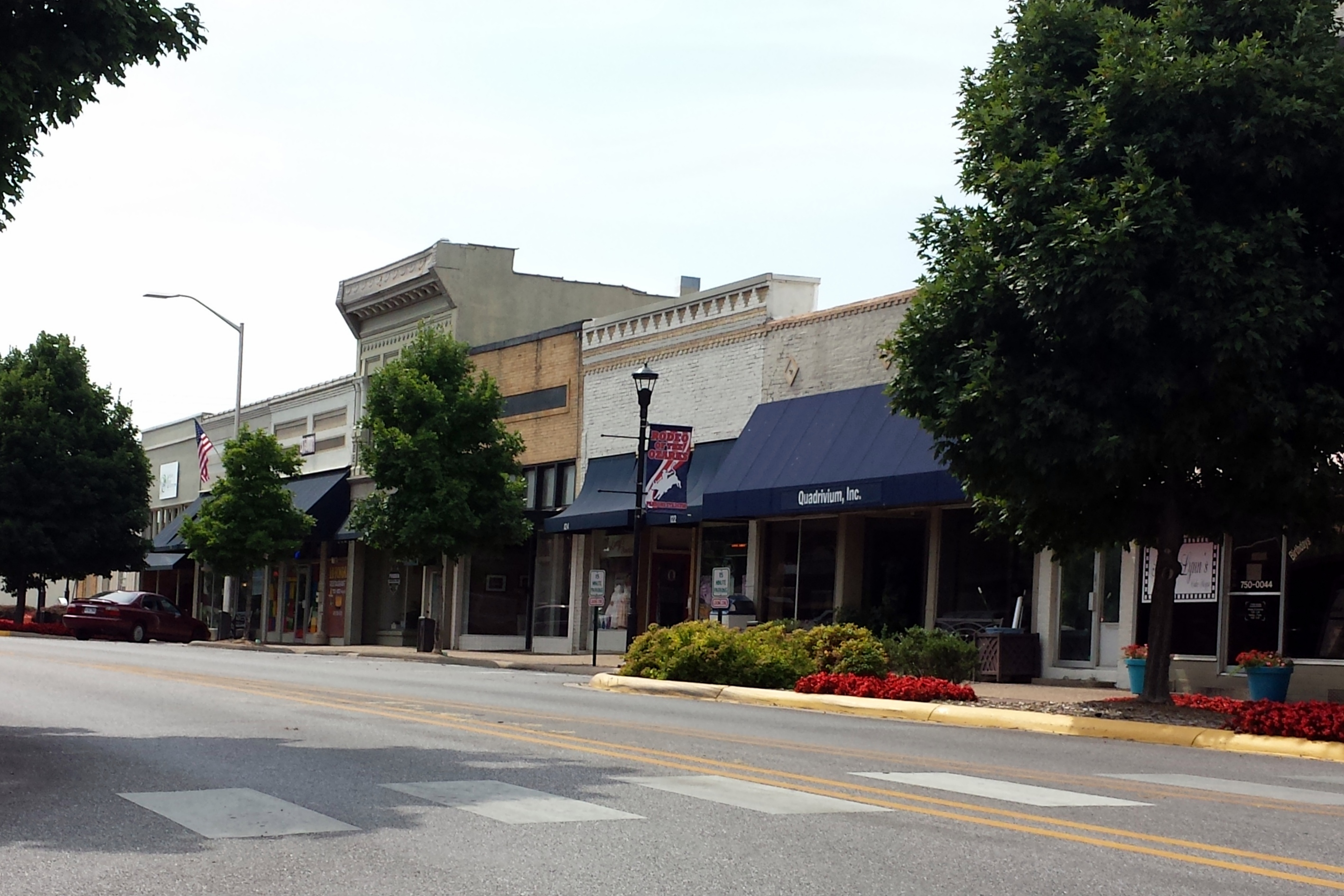
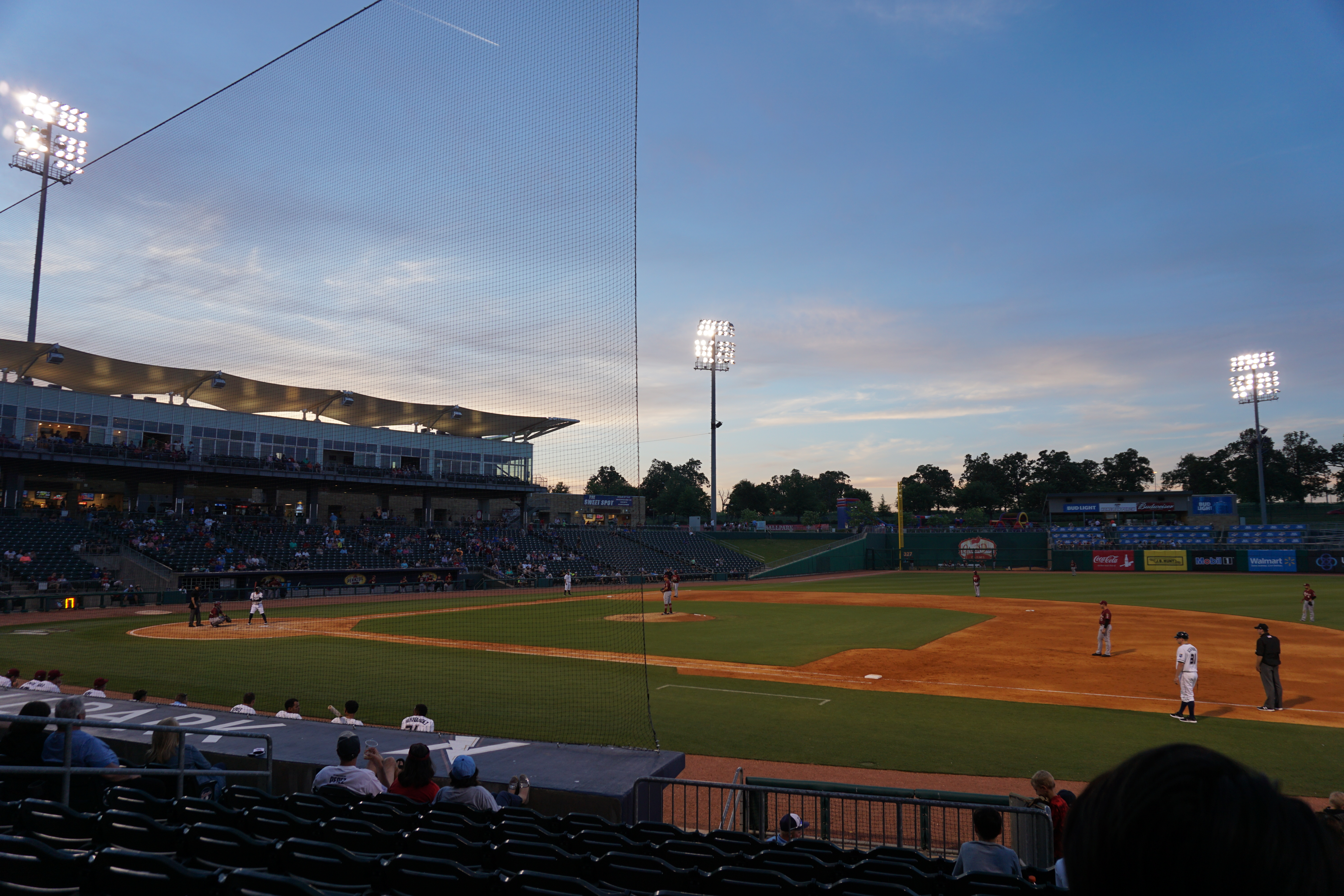
- Spring Creek in Turnbow Park Old Springdale High School Shiloh Museum of Ozark History Emma Avenue Arvest Ballpark

- Flag Seal
- Nickname: The Poultry Capital of the World
- Motto: "We're Making It Happen"
- Interactive map of Springdale, Arkansas
- Location within Arkansas Location within the United States
- Coordinates: 36°11′25″N 94°09′27″W
- State: Arkansas
- Counties: Washington, Benton
- Founded: 1838

Government
  - Type: Mayor-city council
  - Mayor: Doug Sprouse

Area
  - City: 49.70 sq mi (128.73 km^{2})
  - Land: 49.20 sq mi (127.42 km^{2})
  - Water: 0.51 sq mi (1.31 km^{2})
- Elevation: 1,335 ft (407 m)

Population (2020)
  - City: 84,161
  - Estimate (2025): 90,685 ▲
  - Density: 1,711/sq mi (660.5/km^{2})
  - Metro: 546,725
- Time zone: UTC−6 (Central (CST))
  - Summer (DST): UTC−5 (CDT)
- ZIP codes: 72762, 72764-72766
- Area code: 479
- FIPS code: 05-66080
- GNIS feature ID: 2405509
- Website: www.springdalear.gov
- NWA metro population as of 2019

Springdale is a city in Washington and Benton counties in the U.S. state of Arkansas. The population was 84,161 at the 2020 census, making it the fourth-most populous city in Arkansas. It is included in the three-county Northwest Arkansas metropolitan area, which had 546,725 residents in 2020.

Located on the Springfield Plateau deep in the Ozark Mountains, Springdale has long been an important industrial city for the region. In addition to several trucking companies, the city is home to the world headquarters of Tyson Foods, the world's largest meat- producing company.

Springdale has been experiencing a population boom in recent years, as indicated by a 133% growth in population between the 1990 and 2010 censuses. During this period of rapid growth, the city has seen the establishment of a Springdale campus of Northwest Arkansas Community College and the Northwest Arkansas Naturals minor league baseball team move into Arvest Ballpark. Tyson remains the city's top employer and is visible throughout the city. Governor Mike Beebe signed an act into law recognizing Springdale as "The Poultry Capital of the World" in 2013.

== History ==
Springdale was formerly called Shiloh and was platted under that original name in 1866. In 1878, the town was incorporated with the name of Springdale.

In 2020, voters of the city of Bethel Heights decided to merge with Springdale after the city sanitation plant received several violations from the Arkansas Health Department. The city was eventually annexed on August 21, 2020.

An intense EF3 tornado struck the town on March 30, 2022, heavily damaging or destroying several structures and injuring seven people.

== Geography ==
According to the United States Census Bureau, the city has a total area of 49.7 square miles (129 km^{2}), of which, 49.2 square miles (127 km^{2}) of it is land and 0.5 square miles (1.3 km^{2}) of it, or 0.62%, is water. The city limits extend north into southern Benton County. Springdale is bordered by the cities of Cave Springs, Lowell, to the north, by Elm Springs and Tontitown to the west, and by Johnson and Fayetteville to the south.

The city is located in both Benton and Washington counties along Interstate 49/US Highway 62/US Highway 71 (I-49/US 62/US 71). This is the only fully controlled access route through the area, which replaced the winding US 71 (now US 71B) in the 1990s. An interstate connection with Fort Smith to the south and Kansas City, Missouri, to the north has greatly helped to grow Springdale. Within Washington County, Springdale is bordered along the south by Fayetteville and Johnson. In some locations, this transition is seamless. The city extends west and east along Highway 412 toward Tontitown and Beaver Lake, respectively.

=== Geology ===
Springdale is located on the Springfield Plateau, a subset of The Ozarks which run through northwest Arkansas, southern Missouri, and Northeastern Oklahoma. In the Springdale area, sandstone and shale were deposited on top of the Springfield Plateau during the Pennsylvanian Period. These were eroded after the Ouachita orogeny and uplift, exposing Mississippian limestone formations of the Springfield Plateau visible today.

=== Climate ===
Springdale lies in the humid subtropical climate zone (Köppen Cfa) with influence from the humid continental climate type. The climate in this area is characterized by hot, humid summers and generally mild to cool winters. The climate is similar to that of nearby Fayetteville.

July is the hottest month of the year, with an average high of 89 °F (32 °C) and an average low of 71 °F (22 °C). Temperatures above 100 °F (38 °C) are uncommon but not rare, occurring on average twice a year, with 57 days over 90 °F (32 °C) annually. January is the coldest month with an average high of 46 °F (8 °C) and an average low of 29 °F (−2 °C). The city's highest temperature was 111 °F (43.9 °C), recorded in 1954. The lowest temperature recorded was −24 °F (−31 °C), in 1899. Precipitation is weakly seasonal, with a bimodal pattern: wet seasons in the spring and fall, and relatively drier summers and winters, but some rain in all months.

Climate data for Springdale
Month	Jan	Feb	Mar	Apr	May	Jun	Jul	Aug	Sep	Oct	Nov	Dec	Year
Mean daily maximum °F (°C)	46.4 (8.0)	50.2 (10.1)	60.4 (15.8)	68.7 (20.4)	75.7 (24.3)	84.9 (29.4)	88.9 (31.6)	88.5 (31.4)	82.0 (27.8)	70.5 (21.4)	59.0 (15.0)	48.7 (9.3)	68.7 (20.4)
Daily mean °F (°C)	37.0 (2.8)	40.6 (4.8)	50.4 (10.2)	59.0 (15.0)	67.1 (19.5)	75.9 (24.4)	79.5 (26.4)	78.4 (25.8)	71.4 (21.9)	59.9 (15.5)	48.9 (9.4)	39.9 (4.4)	59.0 (15.0)
Mean daily minimum °F (°C)	28.6 (−1.9)	31.6 (−0.2)	41.2 (5.1)	49.5 (9.7)	58.6 (14.8)	67.5 (19.7)	70.7 (21.5)	69.4 (20.8)	61.9 (16.6)	50.7 (10.4)	39.9 (4.4)	32.0 (0.0)	50.1 (10.1)
Average precipitation inches (mm)	1.57 (40)	1.79 (45)	2.48 (63)	2.81 (71)	3.09 (78)	2.30 (58)	2.69 (68)	2.35 (60)	2.12 (54)	2.02 (51)	1.53 (39)	1.68 (43)	26.43 (670)
Source: Weather.Directory

== Demographics ==
Historical population
Census	Pop.	Note	%±
1880	249		—
1890	1,146		360.2%
1900	1,251		9.2%
1910	1,755		40.3%
1920	2,263		28.9%
1930	2,763		22.1%
1940	3,319		20.1%
1950	5,835		75.8%
1960	10,076		72.7%
1970	16,783		66.6%
1980	23,458		39.8%
1990	29,941		27.6%
2000	45,798		53.0%
2010	69,797		52.4%
2020	84,161		20.6%
2025 (est.)	90,685	▲	7.8%
Encyclopedia of Arkansas; History and Culture

=== Racial and ethnic composition ===
Springdale, Arkansas – racial and ethnic composition Note: the US census treats Hispanic/Latino as an ethnic category. This table excludes Latinos from the racial categories and assigns them to a separate category. Hispanics/Latinos may be of any race.
Race / ethnicity (NH = Non-Hispanic)	Pop. 2000	Pop. 2010	Pop. 2020	% 2000	% 2010	% 2020
White alone (NH)	33,926	36,798	34,543	74.08%	52.72%	41.04%
Black or African American alone (NH)	293	1,160	1,733	0.64%	1.66%	2.06%
Native American or Alaska Native alone (NH)	370	534	544	0.81%	0.77%	0.65%
Asian alone (NH)	760	1,336	1,791	1.66%	1.91%	2.13%
Pacific Islander or Native Hawaiian alone (NH)	700	3,967	8,662	1.53%	5.68%	10.29%
Other race alone (NH)	24	105	193	0.05%	0.15%	0.23%
Mixed-race or multiracial (NH)	720	1,205	3,408	1.57%	1.73%	4.05%
Hispanic or Latino (any race)	9,005	24,692	33,287	19.66%	35.38%	39.55%
Total	45,798	69,797	84,161	100.00%	100.00%	100.00%

=== 2020 census ===
As of the 2020 census, Springdale had a population of 84,161 and 27,077 households; 19,475 were family households. The median age was 31.2 years. 30.5% of residents were under the age of 18 and 10.2% were 65 years of age or older. For every 100 females there were 99.4 males, and for every 100 females age 18 and over there were 96.3 males age 18 and over.

95.3% of residents lived in urban areas, while 4.7% lived in rural areas.

Of all households, 43.4% had children under the age of 18 living in them. 49.0% were married-couple households, 17.0% were households with a male householder and no spouse or partner present, and 24.8% were households with a female householder and no spouse or partner present. About 21.6% of all households were made up of individuals and 7.8% had someone living alone who was 65 years of age or older.

There were 28,275 housing units, of which 4.2% were vacant. The homeowner vacancy rate was 1.0% and the rental vacancy rate was 4.6%.

Racial composition as of the 2020 census
Race	Number	Percent
White	39,343	46.7%
Black or African American	1,884	2.2%
American Indian and Alaska Native	1,352	1.6%
Asian	1,836	2.2%
Native Hawaiian and Other Pacific Islander	8,711	10.4%
Some other race	20,404	24.2%
Two or more races	10,631	12.6%

=== 2010 census ===
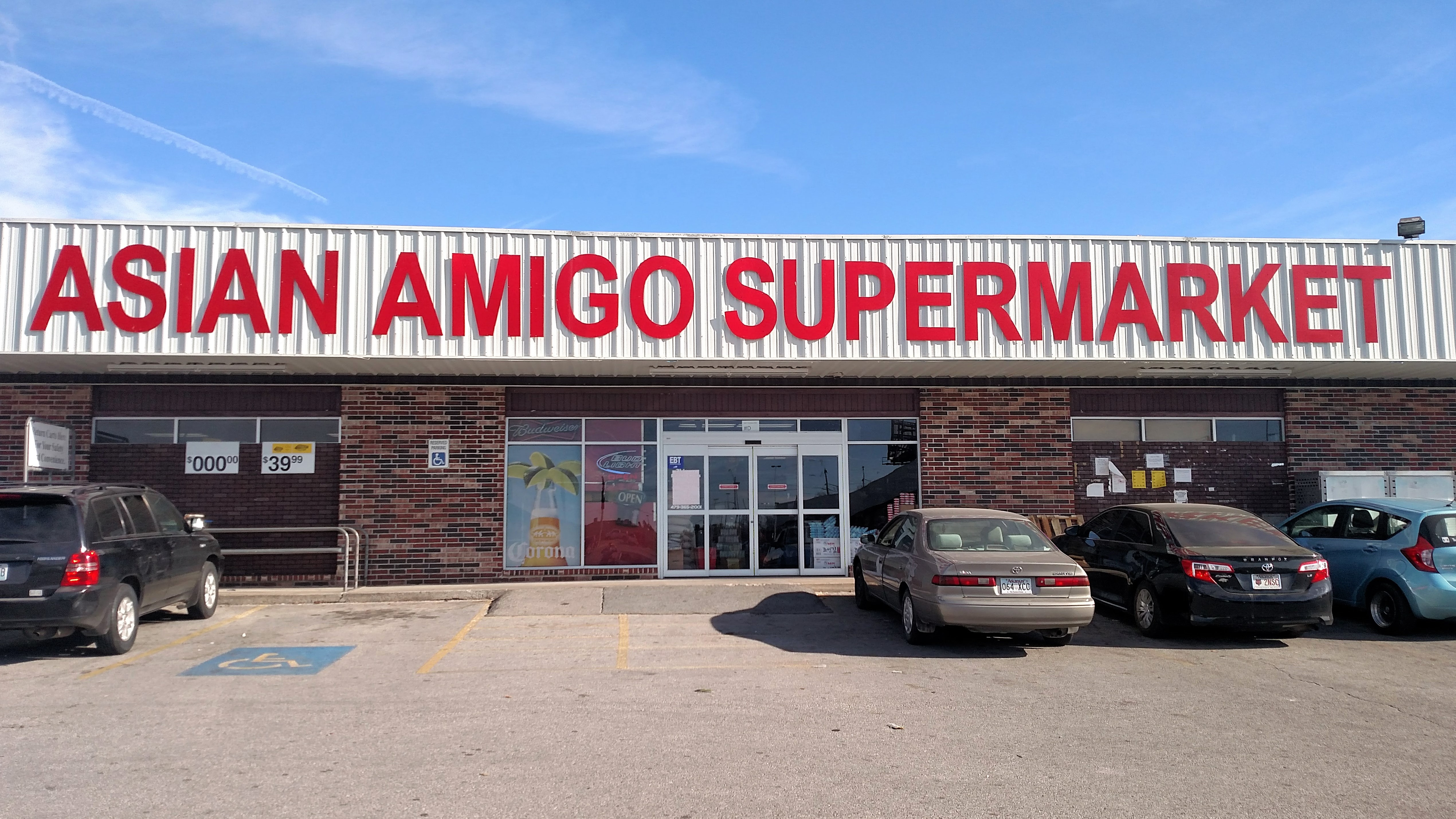
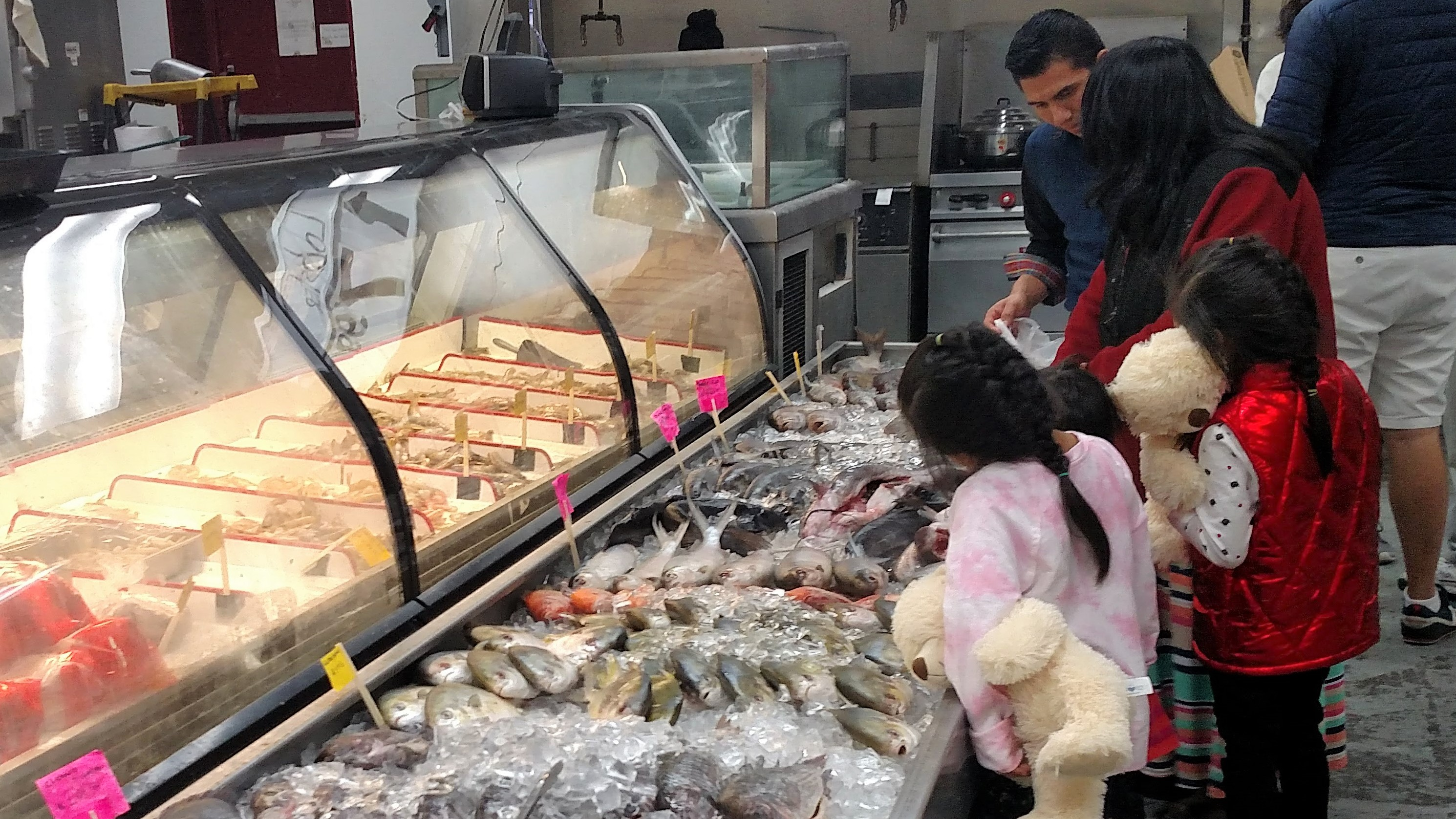
The Asian Amigo Supermarket represents the intersection of Asian and Hispanic populations in Springdale.

According to the 2010 US census, the total population was 69,797. Of this, 45,185 (64.74%) were White, 15,332 (21.97%) were some other race, 3,976 (5.70%) were Native Hawaiian or other Pacific Islanders, 2,011 (2.88%) were two or more races, 1,363 (1.95%) were Asian, 1,251 (1.79%) were Black or African American, 679 (0.97%) were American Indian or Alaska Native. 24,592 (35.38%) were Hispanic or Latino (of any race)

There were 22,678 households, out of which 41.9% had children under the age of 18 living with them, 53.0% were married couples living together, 13.3% had a female householder with no husband present, and 27.0% were non-families. 21.5% of all households were made up of individuals, and 8.2% had someone living alone who was 65 years of age or older. The average household size was 3.02 and the average family size was 3.54.

The median income for a household in the city was $26,523, and the median income for a family was $46,407. Males had a median income of $31,495 versus $26,492 for females. The per capita income for the city was $18,645. 21.3% of the population and 17.4% of families were below the poverty line. Out of the total population, 33.6% of those under the age of 18 and 6.3% of those 65 and older were living below the poverty line.

=== Metropolitan area ===
The Northwest Arkansas region consists of three Arkansas counties: Benton, Madison, and Washington. The area had a population of 347,045 at the 2000 census which had increased to 463,204 by the 2010 census (an increase of 33.47 percent). The Metropolitan Statistical Area does not consist of the usual principal-city-with-suburbs morphology; instead Springdale is bordered to the north by Rogers, the south by Fayetteville, and the northwest by Bentonville, with smaller cities like Lowell and Johnson in between.

=== Marshallese population ===
The city is home to the largest community of Marshall Islanders in the United States, which dates to the 1980s, when one Marshall Islander arrived in the city to work for Tyson Foods and subsequently spread word of plentiful jobs to others in the islands. The Marshall Islands opened a consulate in the city in 2008.

=== Religion ===
56.8% of Springdale's population describes themselves as religious, slightly above the national average of 48.8%. 25.6% of people in Springdale who describe themselves as having a religion are Baptist (14.5% of the city's total population). 12.5% of people holding a religion are Catholic (7.1% of the city's total population).

== Economy ==
Top employers Springdale Chamber of Commerce
#	Employer	# of employees
1	Tyson Foods	4,300
2	George's	2,500
3	Springdale Public Schools	2,235
4	Cargill Meat Solutions	1,200
5	Northwest Medical Center-Springdale	900
6	Rockline Industries	535
7	A.E.R.T.	500
8	Harps Food Stores	495
9	Kawneer	465
10	Multi-Craft Contractors	400

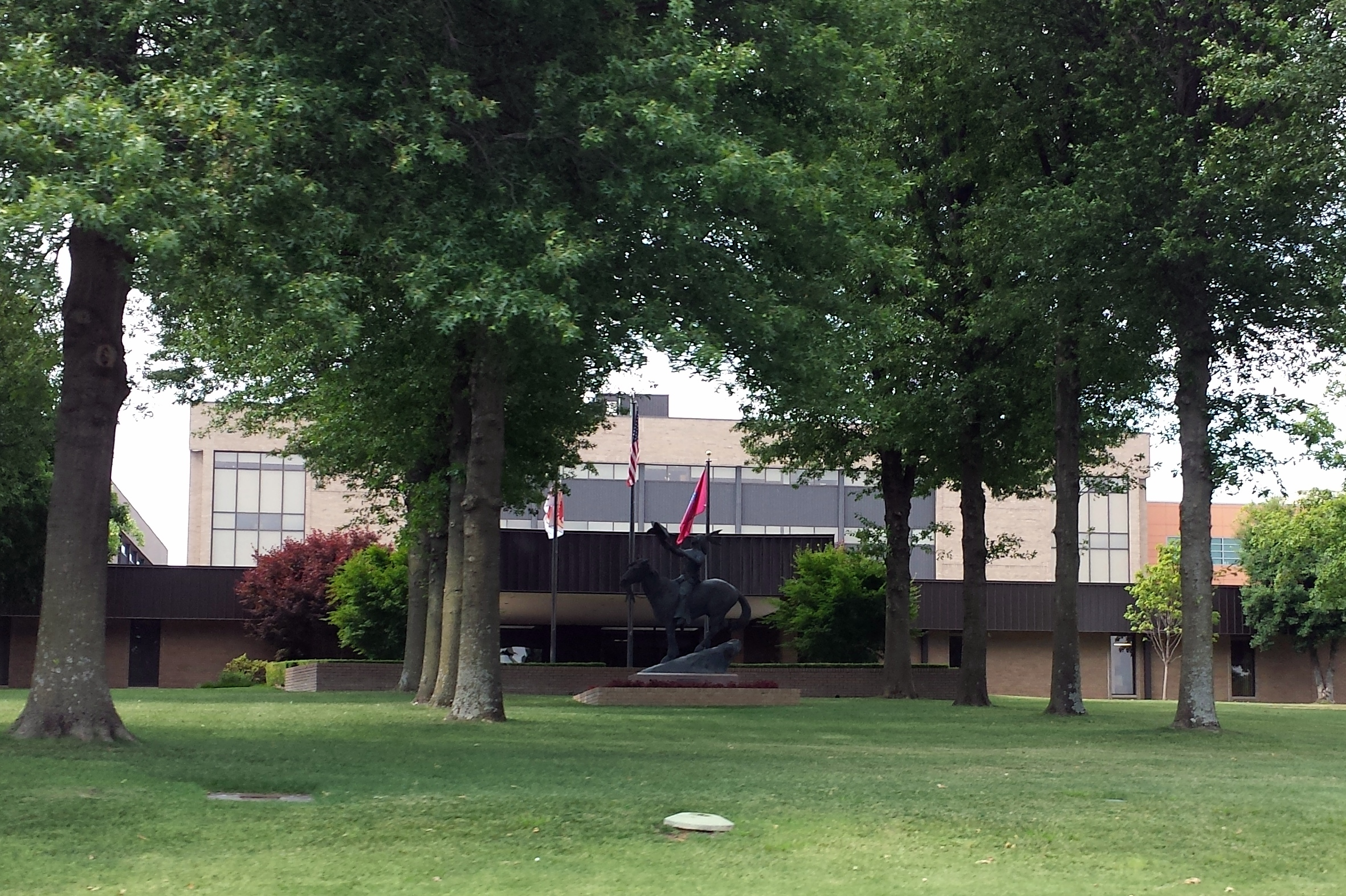
Tyson World Headquarters

Springdale has a poultry processing industry operated by Tyson Foods, Cargill, and George's.

== Arts and culture ==
Points of interest

- Arts Center of the Ozarks
- Arvest Ballpark
- Fitzgerald Station and Farmstead
- Shiloh Historic District
- Shiloh Museum of Ozark History
- Springdale Poultry Industry Historic District
- The Springdale Post Office contains a 1939 Natalie Smith Henry mural, titled Local Industries, commissioned by the Treasury Department's Section of Fine Arts. Depictions of poultry and fruit farmers reflected the early industries of Tyson Foods and Welch's Grape Juice Company. Springdale was the southwest regional headquarters of the Welch's company.

Parsons Stadium in eastern Springdale is host to many events throughout the year, most notably the Rodeo of the Ozarks. This four-day event began in Springdale in 1944 and brings professional cowboys and cowgirls to the city for one of the nation's top outdoor rodeos. Always hosted on Independence Day weekend, the event brings a parade, the Miss Rodeo of the Ozarks Pageant, and the Grand Entrance to the stadium. It also hosts Buckin' in the Ozarks (a Professional Bull Riders [PBR] event), Arenacross (a motocross competition with professional and amateur exhibitions) during Bikes Blues and BBQ weekend and other motorized exhibitions.

== Sports ==
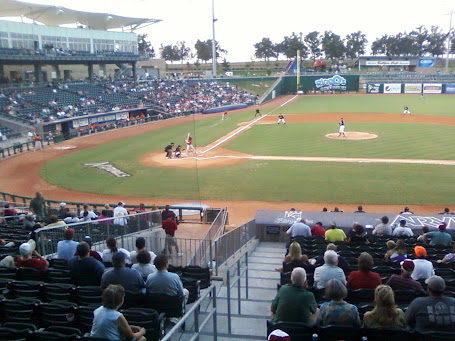
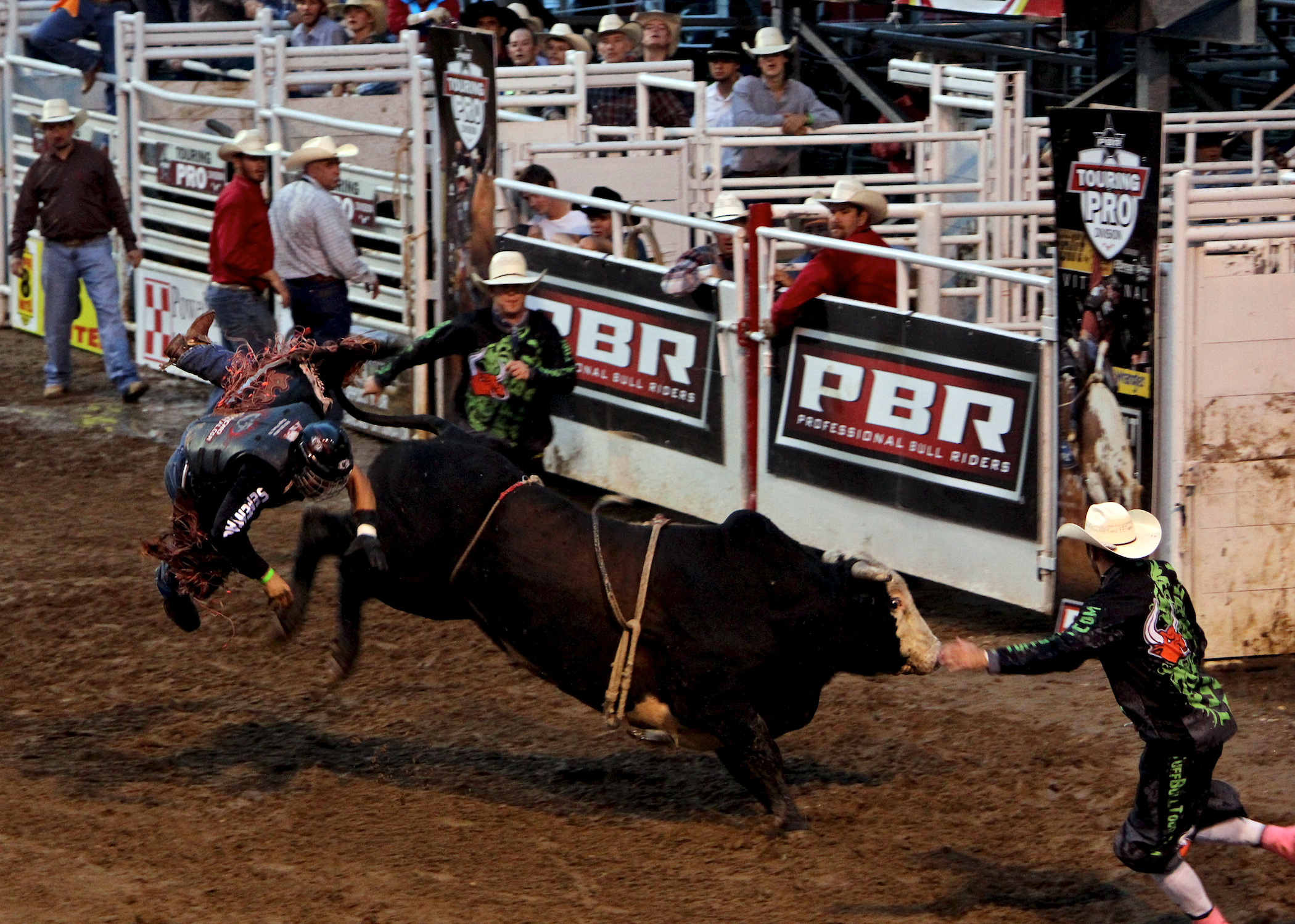
Left: NWA Naturals playing in Arvest Ballpark.
Right: Bull riding in Parsons Stadium

Springdale is home to the Northwest Arkansas Naturals, the minor league baseball team of the Texas League. The team, formerly known as the Wichita Wranglers, relocated in 2008 upon completion of Arvest Ballpark. The stadium has 6,500 seats and additional grass berm seating as well as suites and event space for private events. Approximately 70 Naturals home games are played in the stadium every year. In 2013, Arvest Ballpark hosted the 77th annual Texas League All-Star Game.

== Government ==
Springdale operates within the mayor-city council form of government. The mayor is elected by a citywide election to serve as the chief executive officer (CEO) of the city by presiding over all city functions, policies, rules and laws. Once elected, the mayor also allocates duties to city employees. Mayors serve four-year terms and can serve unlimited terms. The city council consists of eight members who together form the legislative body for the city. The council balances the city's budget and passes ordinances. The body also controls the representatives of specialized city commissions underneath their jurisdiction. Two members are elected from each of the city's four wards. The council meets every second and fourth Tuesday of the month at the City Administration Building.

Citizen input is welcomed through the use of various specialized groups. Positions are appointed by the mayor and approved by the city council.

Springdale is represented by Republican Steve Womack, representative for Arkansas's 3rd congressional district.

== Education ==
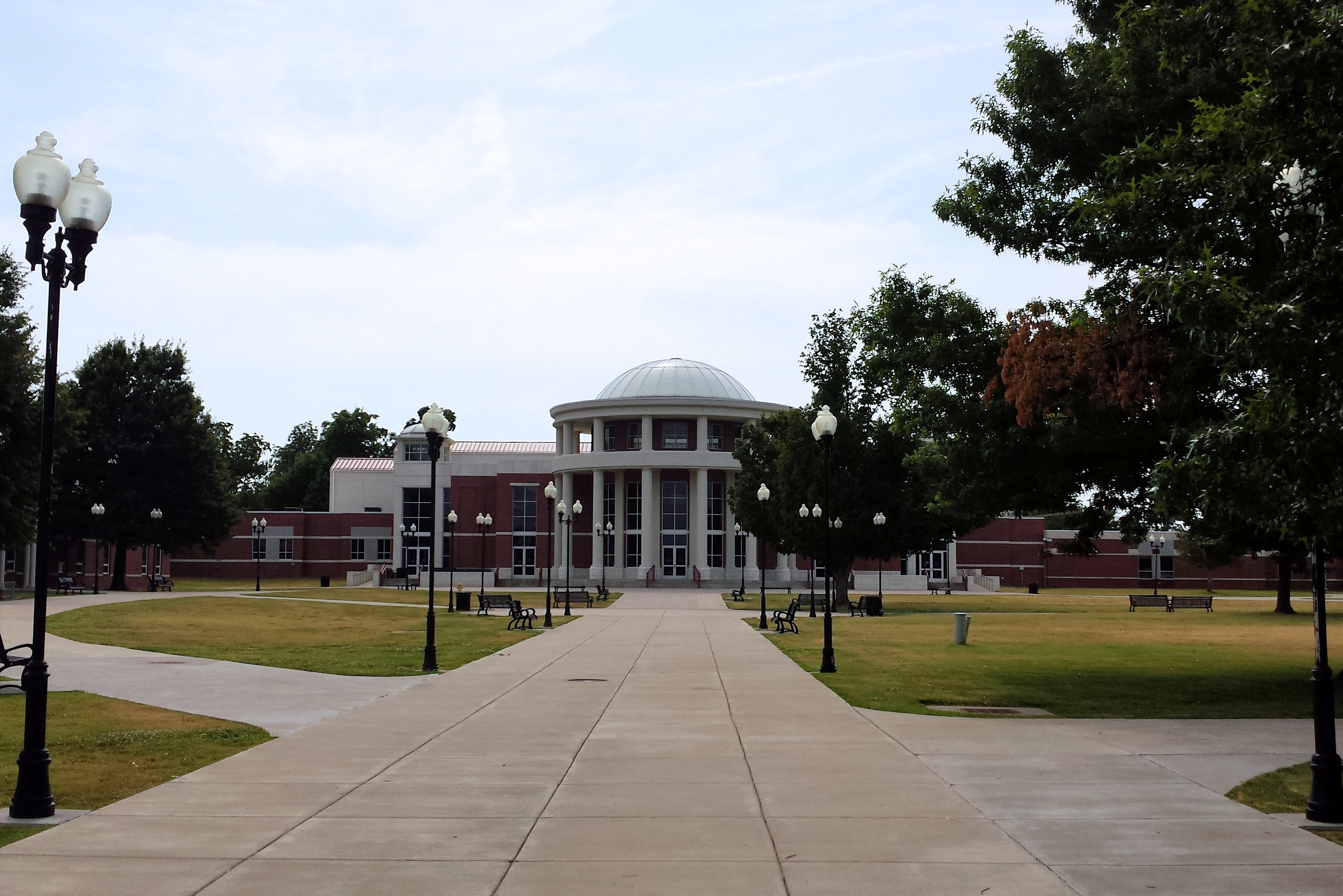
Springdale High School

=== Primary and secondary ===
Springdale Public Schools is the largest school district in Arkansas, providing educational services to over 23,000 students on 29 campuses in the city. Pre-kindergarten, seventeen elementary schools, four middle schools, Springdale High School, Har-Ber High School, and the Don Tyson School of Innovation constitute the district. The district offers a variety of programs, including International Baccalaurate Programme and the (Environmental and Spatial Technology) EAST Initiative. College prep programs (academies) for Engineering and Architecture, IT, Law and Public Safety, and Medical Profession Education allow students to begin specialized instruction.

Most of Springdale, including all portions of Springdale in Washington County, is in Springdale Public Schools. Within Benton County, other districts that include sections of Springdale include Bentonville Public Schools and Rogers Public Schools.

Shiloh Christian School is a private school founded in 1976 by Cross Church. It is fully accredited by the Association of Christian Schools International and Arkansas Nonpublic School Accrediting Association. The PreK–12 student body is approximately 900 students.

A Catholic school, St. Raphael School, of the Roman Catholic Diocese of Little Rock, operated in Springdale until its 2013 closure. The nearest Catholic high school is Ozark Catholic Academy in Tontitown.

=== Higher education ===
The Northwest Technical Institute (NWTI) provides occupational training for residents of Springdale and Northwest Arkansas. NWTI also has an Adult Education Center where students earn GEDs, study English as a foreign language, and study to apply for US citizenship.

Springdale has a campus of the Northwest Arkansas Community College. This two-year public community college provides associate degrees and non-credit courses. Ecclesia College is a small religious work college accredited through the Association for Biblical Higher Education located in western Springdale.

== Infrastructure ==
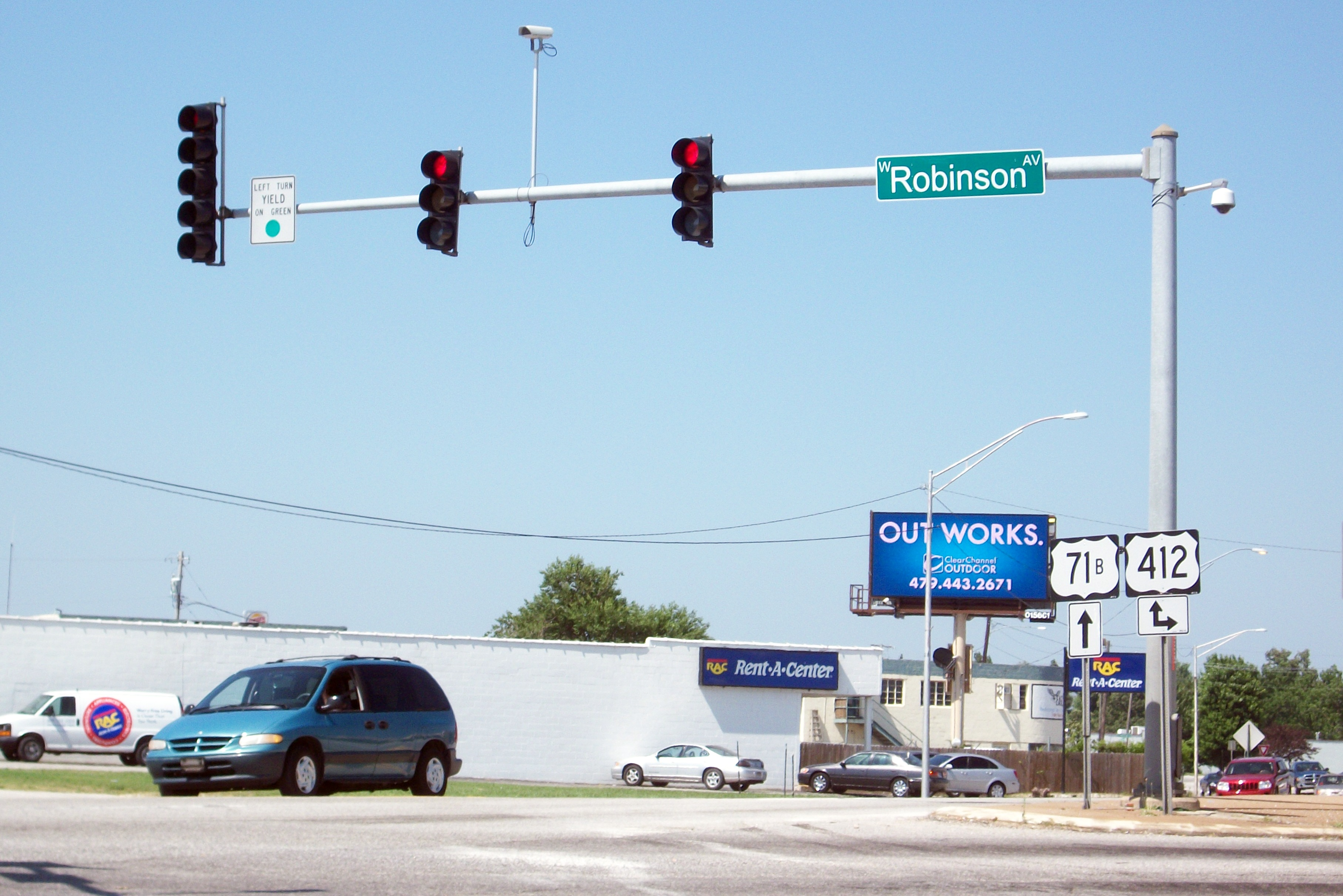
US 412 and US 71B briefly overlap in Springdale along Thompson Avenue.

=== Transportation ===
- Interstate 42
- Interstate 49
- US Route 62
- US Route 71
- US Route 412 Business
- US Route 71 Business
- Highway 112
- Highway 264
- Highway 265

The major through route in Springdale is Interstate 49/US 71/US 62 (the concurrent routes are unsigned and thus the route is simply known as I-49 in Springdale). This fully controlled access, four-lane expressway is a discontinuous piece of a route ultimately planned to connect Kansas City, Missouri to New Orleans, Louisiana. Formerly designated as Interstate 540 with the re-designation as Interstate 49 being granted by the U.S. Department of Transportation Federal Highway Administration in 2014, the highway became the first freeway in the area when it was completed in the 1990s to relieve the former US 71 (now US 71B) of a much-increased demand of through travelers following the unanticipated and rapid growth of Northwest Arkansas. Major construction along the I-49 corridor included the Bella Vista Bypass, which was opened to traffic north of Springdale in October 2021. Future plans for the I-49 corridor include completion of a freeway segment through the Ouachita Mountains to Texarkana.

Springdale's major provider of public transportation is Ozark Regional Transit. The bus-based regional transit system runs throughout Washington and Benton Counties and is administrated by the Arkansas State Highway and Transportation Department. The nearest intercity bus service is provided by Jefferson Lines in nearby Fayetteville.

The Springdale Municipal Airport is a general aviation airport located near downtown Springdale. Commercial air service in Northwest Arkansas is available from Northwest Arkansas National Airport in Highfill.

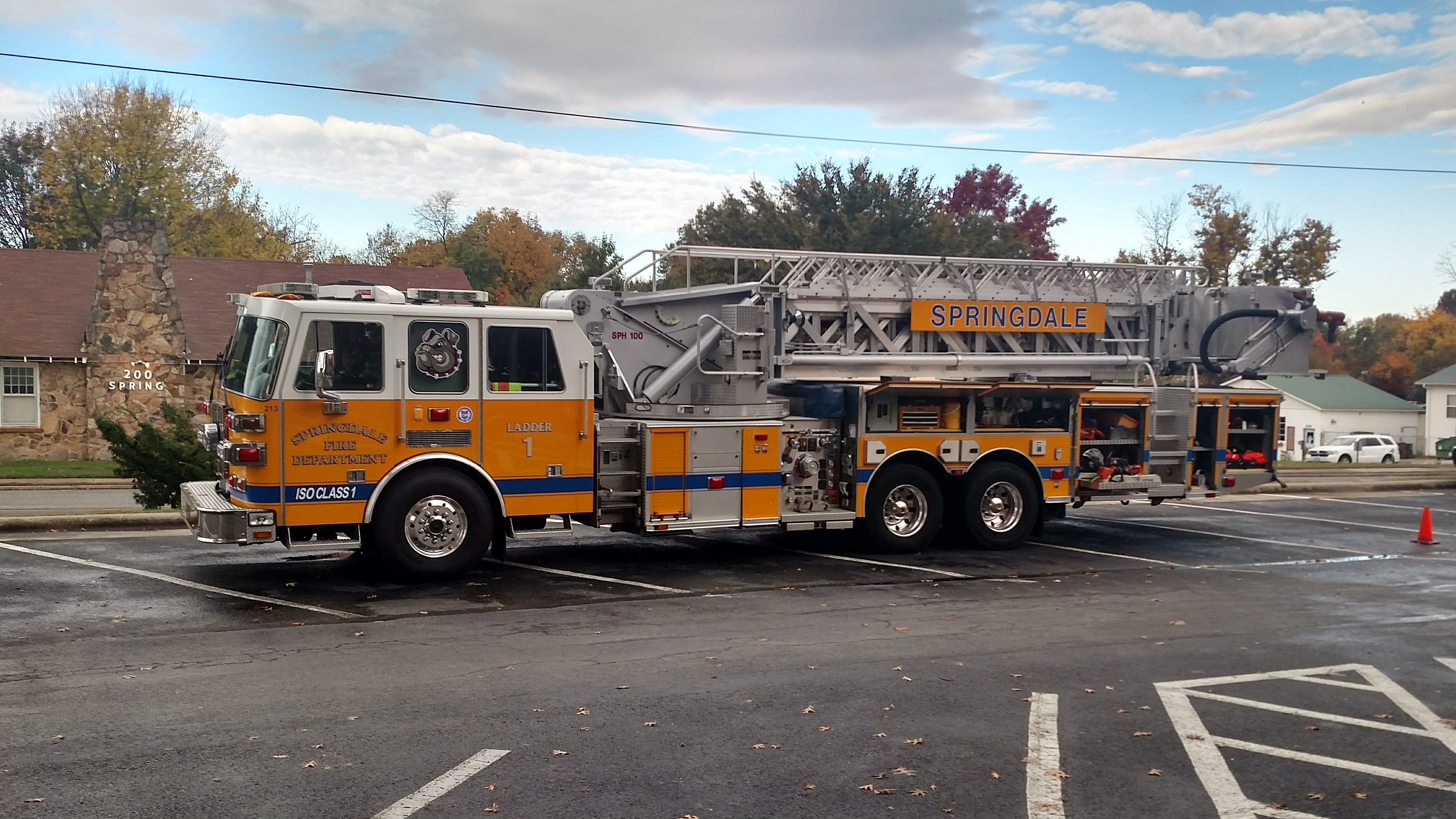
SFD fire apparatus "Ladder 1"

=== Public safety ===
The Springdale Police Department is the primary law enforcement agency in the city. As of 2017, Springdale had 208 police department employees, including civilian and support staff. The Springdale Fire Department is a career fire service providing emergency medical services, fire cause determination, fire prevention, fire suppression, hazardous materials mitigation, and rescue services. Springdale has been listed as an ISO Class 1 city since 2017.

== Notable people ==
- George W. Bond, educator in Springdale; later president of Louisiana Tech University
- Albert E. Brumley, southern gospel music composer, member of the Gospel Music Hall of Fame
- Kevin Carson, author and contemporary individualist anarchist and mutualist theorist
- The Duggar family from TLC's 19 Kids and Counting
- Jim Bob Duggar, member of the Arkansas House of Representatives 1999–2002
- Jenee Fleenor, musician, named 2019, 2020 and 2021 Country Music Association Musician of the Year
- Ronnie Floyd, Cross Church pastor and president of the Southern Baptist Convention 2014–2016
- Joshua Frazier, former professional football player
- Kiehl Frazier, 2010 USA Today High School Football Offensive Player of the Year, Auburn University and later Ouachita Baptist University quarterback
- Megan Godfrey, politician representing Springdale in the Arkansas House 2019–2023
- Josh Hawley, U.S. senator from Missouri
- Asa Hutchinson, politician representing the Arkansas 3rd 1997–2001, 46th governor of Arkansas 2015–2023
- Timothy Chad Hutchinson, lawyer in Fayetteville, Republican former member of the Arkansas House of Representatives
- Greg Leding, politician representing Fayetteville in the Arkansas House and part of Washington County
- Gus Malzahn, football coach
- Mitch Mustain, football and baseball player
- Rhett Lashlee, former quarterback for the University of Arkansas
- Robin Lundstrum, member of the Arkansas House of Representatives for Benton and Washington counties
- Micah Neal, member of the Arkansas House of Representatives from Springdale
- Danny L. Patrick, member of the Arkansas House of Representatives 1967–1970
- Zack Pianalto, former professional football player
- Carolyn Pollan, represented Sebastian County in the Arkansas House 1975–1999
- Harry L. Steele, U.S. Army major general
- Don Tyson, CEO and chairman of Tyson Foods 1967–1991
- John H. Tyson, chairman of Tyson Foods 1998–present
- John W. Tyson, founder and CEO of Tyson Foods from 1935 until his death in 1967
- Hugh Franklin Waters, U.S. district judge of the Western District of Arkansas
- Damian Williams, former NFL wide receiver
- Matt Wilson, racing driver
- Jon Woods, musician and Republican politician representing Springdale, later convicted of fraud and money laundering
