= Shiloh Museum of Ozark History =

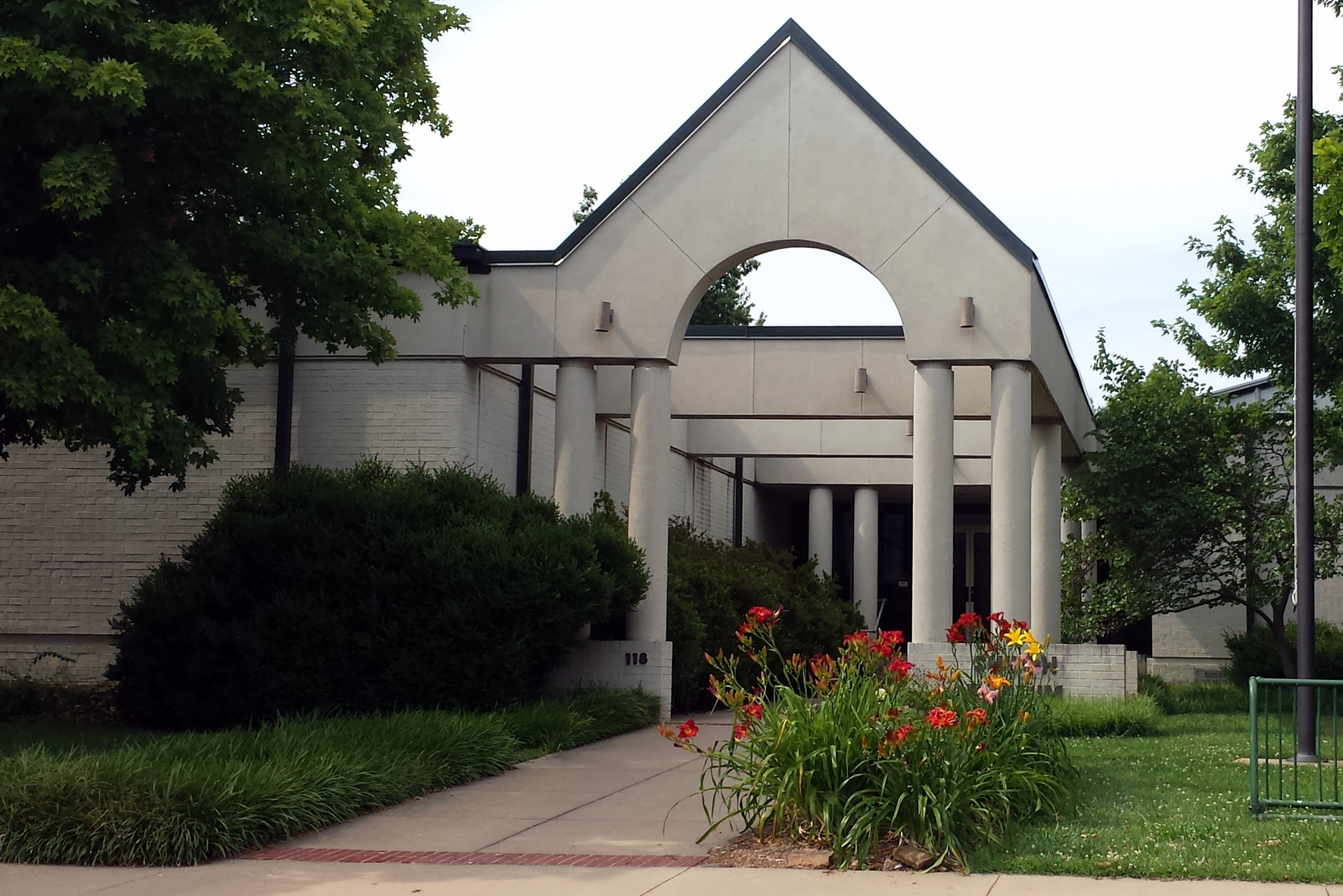
- Established: 1968
- Location: 118 W. Johnson Avenue; Springdale, Arkansas
- Coordinates: 36.1867°N 94.1319°W
- Type: History museum
- Website: www.shilohmuseum.org

The Shiloh Museum of Ozark History, located in Springdale, Arkansas, is a regional history museum covering the Arkansas Ozarks. The museum offers programs, exhibits, and events on Ozark and Northwest Arkansas history to the public. The museum has a large research library and the largest collection of historic images in Arkansas. The public can access the library during regular museum hours. The geographic region covered by the museum includes the following six counties: Benton County, Boone County, Carroll County, Madison County, Newton County, and Washington County.

== History ==
The 1965 purchase of a significant collection of Native American artifacts by the city of Springdale signaled the establishment of the Shiloh Museum. An amateur archeologist was soon hired to serve as curator and the museum opened in the former library building on 8 September 1968. Initially, the museum concerned itself with purely Springdale local history, but as time passed, expanded its interest and collection to the surrounding areas of the Arkansas Ozarks.

In 1980, the museum hired a full-time professional director, and with an enlarged and more active board of trustees, the museum expanded its scope and activities. New educational programs were created to draw in and involve the public, dynamic exhibit schemes were presented, and the successful petition of seven federal grants signaled a positive change for the museum. Throughout the decade, the museum expanded its staff and resources, and won the Award for Merit from the American Association for State and Local History for the Vanishing Northwest Arkansas program that consists of more than 100,000 images.

Another notable addition to the museum in the 1980s was the acquisition of historic buildings, now situated on the property. This collection includes, an 1850s log cabin, 1870s general store, 1880s doctor's office, and a 1930s outhouse. Alongside these buildings is a pre-existing 1870s home (remodeled in the 1930s). A decade later, a 1930s barn was added to the collection, in which is housed the museum's antique farm machinery collection. And in 2005 a seventh historic building was added, now called the Shiloh Meeting Hall, built in 1871 as a hall for three churches and the Masons, later used by the Women's Civic Club, and between 1935 and 2005 as the Odd Fellows Lodge.

In 1991, the museum opened its new home, a 22,000-square-foot (2,000 m^{2}) former library building, which is part of the Shiloh Historic District. The Shiloh Museum of Ozark History is mainly funded by the City of Springdale, though more than two thirds of its patrons live outside of the city limits. The museum has been named "Museum of the Year" four times by the Arkansas Museum Association in 1982, 1991, 2004, and 2008.

=== Name ===
The original name of the City of Springdale was Shiloh up until 1872. At that time, the town of Shiloh applied for a postal designation, only to discover that another town of Shiloh already existed in the state of Arkansas. Due to United States Postal Service regulations, the town was forced to change its name to receive a post office. The town then assumed its current name, after the numerous springs that are prevalent in the area. When the museum was established, it was named in honor of the original name of the city, the Shiloh Museum. In 1993, the board of trustees expanded the name to include Ozark history to better represent the museum's mission.

== Awards ==
Over the years the Shiloh Museum of Ozark History has won numerous awards and this list highlights just a few.

Arkansas Museum Association 1982 Museum of the Year

Arkansas Museum Association 1991 Museum of the Year

American Association for State and Local History 1993 Award for Vanishing Northwest Arkansas Photo Project

Arkansas Museum Association 1995 Publication of the Year, Shiloh Scrapbook

Arkansas Museum Association 1997 Best Book of the Year, Shiloh Reflections

Arkansas Museum Association 2004 Museum of the Year, Budget more than $200,000

Arkansas Museum Association 2005 Adult Educational Program of the Year, Hola, amigos! Historic Ozarks & Latin American Amigos

Arkansas Museum Association 2005 Publication of the Year, Shiloh Scrapbook

Arkansas Museum Association 2006 Adult & Family Educational Program of the Year, Shiloh Podcasts

Northwest Arkansas Citiscapes Metro Monthly 2007 Best Museum

Arkansas Museum Association 2007 Publication of the Year, Color the Ozarks

Northwest Arkansas Citiscapes Metro Monthly 2008 Best Museum

Arkansas Museum Association 2008 Adult/Family Educational Program of the Year, Shiloh Museum in iTunes U

Arkansas Museum Association 2008 Museum of the Year, Budget more than $500,000
